= Government of Martinique =

Governing body of Martinique

Martinique is an overseas Territorial collectivity of France, with the same political status as regions and departments in mainland France. The administrative centre of Martinique is located in Fort-de-France.

During the referendum of 24 January 2010, the residents of Martinique approved by 68.4% the creation of a new and unique territorial collectivity which is governed by the section 73 of the French Constitution. The territorial collectivity of Martinique replaces and exercises all the related power and duties of the department's General Council and the Regional Council.

Gran Sanblé pou ba peyi an chans, a coalition of the Martinican Independence Movement and right-wing parties, led by Alfred Marie-Jeanne defeated Ensemble pour une Martinique Nouvelle, a coalition of left-wing parties, led by Serge Letchimy, winning 33 seats out of 51 seats of the new Territorial Collectivity's assembly during the election held on December 13, 2015 in Martinique.

On December 18, 2015 Alfred Marie-Jeanne was elected the first president of the Executive Council of the Territorial Collectivity of Martinique.

== Assembly of Martinique ==
The Assembly of the Territorial Collectivity of Martinique is composed of 51 members elected by proportional representation in two rounds with each list having an equal number of male and female candidates. The term of the Assembly is 6 years. The current president of the assembly is Serge Letchimy.

Party		seats
•	Gran Sanblé pou pa peyi an chans	33
	Ensemble pour une Martinique Nouvelle	18

== General Council of Martinique ==
The General Council of Martinique was composed of 45 seats whose members were elected by popular vote to serve six-year terms. The last President of the General Council was Josette Manin.

Composition
Party		seats
•	Miscellaneous Left	21
•	Martinican Progressive Party	10
	Miscellaneous Right	4
	Union for a Popular Movement	3
	Other regionalists	3
	Martinican Independence Movement	2
	Socialist Party	2

== Regional Council of Martinique ==
The Regional Council was composed of 41 seats whose members were elected by popular vote to serve six-year terms. The last President of the Regional Council was Serge Letchimy.

Composition
Party		seats
•	Martinican Independence Movement	28
	Martinican Progressive Party	9
	UDF (FMP)	4

== Parliamentary representation ==
Notable representatives may be found in Category:Martiniquais politicians

=== French Senate, 2 seats ===
Martinique elects 2 seats to the French Senate; indirect elections were last held in September 2004. The Martinican Progressive Party won 1 senator and one other left-wing candidate was elected.

=== French National Assembly, 4 seats ===
Martinique also elects 4 seats to the French National Assembly, the last elections were held in June 2007. The Union for a Popular Movement elected 1 deputy (Alfred Almont), the Socialist Party elected 1 (Louis-Joseph Manscour), the nationalist Martinican Independence Movement elected 1 (Alfred Marie-Jeanne), and the Martinican Progressive Party also elected 1 (Serge Letchimy, mayor of Fort de France).

Current Deputies
Constituency	Member	Party
1st	Louis-Joseph Manscour	PS
2nd	Alfred Almont	UMP
3rd	Serge Letchimy	PPM
4th	Alfred Marie-Jeanne	MIM

== Judicial system ==
In Martinique, the French system of justice is in force with there being two lower courts (tribunaux d’instance), one higher court (tribunal de grande instance), one administrative court, a commercial court, and a court of appeal at Fort-de-France.

With regard to the legal profession, it is known that women have been practicing law since 1945 when Andrée Pierre-Rose Bocaly became an attorney. She would be followed by Marcelle Yang-ting, Marie-Thérèse Yoyo-Likao, and Marie-Alice André-Jaccoulet (1969) in sequence.

== See also ==
- List of presidents of the Regional Council of Martinique
