= Elections in Martinique =

Martinique is a Single territorial collectivity of France. Martinique elects one deputy to the national assembly from each of four constituencies. It elects on regional/départemental level a legislature, called the Assembly of Martinique, by proportional representation from each of the national assembly constituencies.

The Assembly of Martinique replaced, in 2015, two councils with diverging powers. These were the Regional Council (Conseil régional) with 41 members, elected for a four-year term by proportional representation and the General Council (Conseil général) with members elected for a six-year term in single seat-constituencies.

Martinique has a multi-party system, with numerous parties in which no one party often has a chance of gaining power alone, and parties must work with each other to form coalition governments.

== Last elections ==
The first elections for the Assembly of Martinique were held on 13 December 2015. Gran Sanblé pou ba peyi an chans, a coalition of the Martinican Independence Movement and right-wing parties, led by Alfred Marie-Jeanne defeated Ensemble pour une Martinique Nouvelle, a coalition of left-wing parties, led by Serge Letchimy, winning 33 out of 51 seats.

== Past elections ==
=== 2004 Regional Elections ===
Candidate	Party	Votes (Round One)	% (Round One)	Votes (Round Two)	% (Round Two)
Alfred Marie-Jeanne	MIM	46,006	37.28%	74,860	53.76%
Madeleine de Grandmaison	PPM	21,232	17.20%	43,170	31.00%
Pierre Samont	BPM-FSM-MPF	19,994	16.20%	-	-
Miguel Laventure	UDF (FMP)	17,177	13.92%	21,227	15.24%
Pierre Petit	UMP	8,367	6.78%	-	-
Jean Crusol	Miscellaneous left-wing	5,864	4.75%	-	-
Ghislaine Joachim-Arnaud	Combat Ouvrier-LO	3,866	3.13%	-	-
Max Auguste Dufrénot	Divers	900	0.73%	-	-
Total		123,406	100.00%	139,257	100.00%

==== Seats ====
Party		seats
•	Martinican Independence Movement	28
	Martinican Progressive Party	9
	UDF (FMP)	4

=== 1998 Regional Elections ===
Party		seats
•	Martinican Independence Movement	13
	Rally for the Republic	7
	Martinican Progressive Party	7
	UDF (FMP)	6
	Build the Martinique Country	4
	Martinican Socialist Federation	3
	Miscellaneous Right	1

=== 1992 Regional Elections ===
Party		seats
	Rally for the Republic-Union for French Democracy	16
•	Martinican Progressive Party	9
	Miscellaneous	9
•	Martinique Communist Party	4
•	Martinican Socialist Federation	3

=== 1986 Regional Elections ===
Party		seats
•	Martinican Socialist Federation	21
	Rally for the Republic	11
	Union for French Democracy	9

== See also ==
- Electoral calendar
- Electoral system
