= New Popular Front =

Socialist political coalition in France

New Popular Front Nouveau Front populaire
- Abbreviation: NFP; UG (Note: The Ministry of the Interior refers to the Front's candidates as the Union of the Left (French: Union de la Gauche).)
- Leader: Collective leadership
- Founders: Olivier Faure; Manuel Bompard; Marine Tondelier; Fabien Roussel
- Founded: 10 June 2024
- Preceded by: New Ecological and Social People's Union
- Political position: Left-wing
- Colours: Green; Red; Yellow; Purple; Raspberry
- Senate: 98 / 348
- National Assembly: 195 / 577
- European Parliament: 27 / 81

Website
- nouveaufrontpopulaire.fr
- Politics of France; Political parties; Elections; A: The Front is described as a broad left-wing alliance, with centre-left, left-wing and far-left factions.

The New Popular Front (French: Nouveau Front populaire [nuvo fʁɔ̃ pɔpylɛːʁ], NFP) is a broad left-wing electoral alliance with centre-left, left and far-left factions in France. (Note: The Ministry of the Interior refers to the Front's candidates as the Union of the Left (French: Union de la Gauche). Other names used for the New Popular Front include the abbreviated form of Popular Front (French: Front populaire, FP).) It was launched on 10 June 2024 to contest the 2024 French legislative election following the gains of far-right parties in the 2024 European Parliament election. The Front stood in opposition to both Ensemble, the presidential camp of Emmanuel Macron, as well as the far-right National Rally.

The Front is an alliance of La France Insoumise, the Socialist Party, the Ecologist Pole, the French Communist Party, Génération·s, the Republican and Socialist Left, the New Anticapitalist Party, and other centre-left and left-wing political parties, comprising the majority of left-wing political parties in France. With the unifying motive of defeating the far-right National Rally, its name echoes the interwar anti-fascist alliance the Popular Front.

The Front agreed to a common distribution of candidates and political platform. The platform includes scrapping the 2023 French pension reform law, increasing public sector salaries and welfare benefits, raising the minimum wage by 14 percent, and freezing the price of basic food items and energy. This would be funded by reintroducing a wealth tax, cancelling many tax breaks for the wealthy, and raising income tax on the highest earners. On other issues, such as foreign policy and European integration, the Front's policies are closer to the centre-left.

Pushing for a mobilization of organized labour, political associations, and civil society, the Front received the largest number of seats in the 2024 legislative elections, gaining a relative majority in the National Assembly with 182 members elected. La France Insoumise won the most seats out of all parties in the alliance, gaining 72 seats total.

== Background ==
Before the 2022 French legislative election, several parties of the French Left founded the New Ecological and Social People's Union (NUPES) electoral alliance to jointly contest the election against National Rally, led by Marine Le Pen and the main representative of far-right politics in France, and En Marche, the political party of the incumbent French president Emmanuel Macron. Although collectively able to form the leading opposition bloc, the alliance failed to agree to form a singular parliamentary grouping. Regardless, this denied Macron a majority in the French Parliament. Amid divisions, NUPES was dissolved in June 2023.

== History ==
=== Formation ===
First logo of the New Popular Front

On 9 June, the 2024 European Parliament election in France took place, with exit polls indicating that the National Rally had received twice as many votes as Renaissance, Macron's party, in what was described as a crushing defeat for the incumbent president. The French left's main leaders warned that the far right was "at the door of power". NUPES did not take part under one ballot but under many, and the Socialist Party returned as the largest part of the French left, ahead of La France Insoumise; the Socialist Party rose from 6 to 14 percent, while La France Insoumise scored 10 percent. Responding to his underperformance and tapping into the divided French left, Macron dissolved the parliament to call for snap elections, with the first round scheduled for 30 June and a second for 7 July.

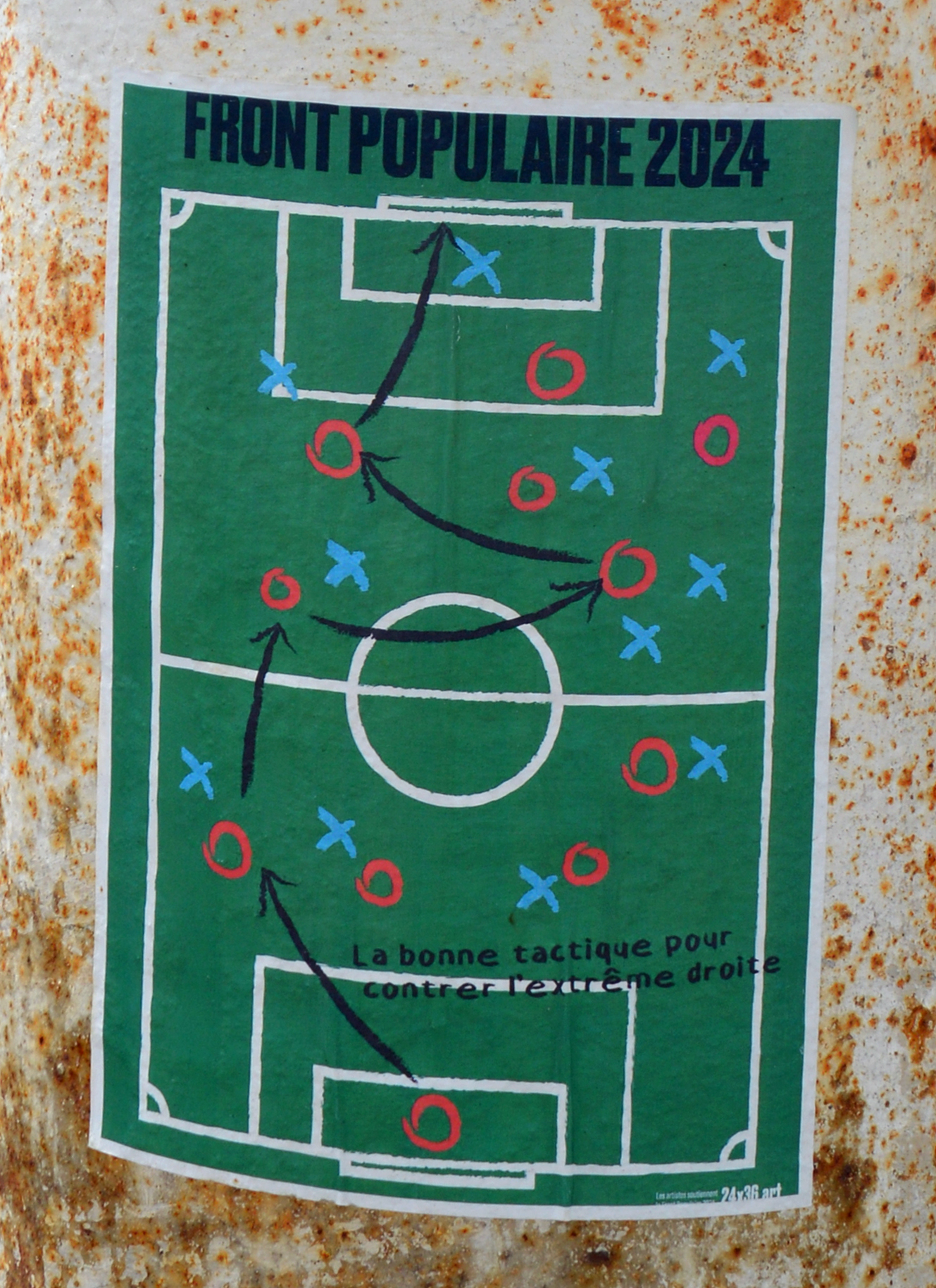
Poster in Le Havre in favor of the New Popular Front, claiming it is "the right tactic to go against the far right"

After the announcement of fresh elections, some called to renew NUPES and form a new left-wing alliance, amid the 2024 French protests against the National Rally, after its member parties had broken up over personal and policy disagreements, from nuclear energy to the wars in Gaza and Ukraine. Leftist politician François Ruffin called on all left-wing parties, including the Ecologists, to form a popular front. Socialist Party leader Olivier Faure called to "create a popular front against the far right" but dismissed the notion of the left allying itself with Macron and criticized his policies.

On 10 June, the New Popular Front, also called the Ecological and Social Popular Front, was announced with an intent to "build an alternative to Emmanuel Macron and fight the racist project of the extreme right" in the upcoming elections. The alliance was formed in order to stop the far-right National Rally party from taking power. The name intends to hark back on the old Popular Front formed in the 1930s. The alliance, which in addition to the main left-wing parties also includes several trade union and anti-racist groups, agreed to a single joint slate of candidates going into the first round of the elections, making the French left the strongest and main challenger to the National Rally.

=== 2024 French legislative election ===
Initially, the Front did not designate a possible next prime minister in the event of success in the legislative election. On 12 June, Jean-Luc Mélenchon was confident of being prime minister but added he was neither excluding nor imposing himself. On 16 June, he expressed his willingness to step aside for the sake of unity, saying: "I will never be the problem. If you don't want me to be prime minister, I won't be." On 22 June, Mélenchon stepped up to this responsibility, saying that it was agreed that the largest parliamentary group within the Front would present its candidate for prime minister. For Raphaël Glucksmann and Carole Delga, the left-wing candidate for prime minister would not be Mélenchon. After his 22 June speech, Mélenchon's figure was brandished by the National Rally and the presidential camp as a repellent.

Several voices in the coalition opposed this hypothesis, considering Mélenchon not unifying enough, in particular Fabien Roussel, Clémentine Autain, François Hollande, and Marine Tondelier. On 24 June, Mélenchon said he was not a candidate but that the prime minister would be from La France Insoumise. On 25 June, François Ruffin said Mélenchon impeded the Front. Ruffin and Roussel said they were ready to take on this responsibility. Valérie Rabault, the vice-president of the French National Assembly, said she was in favour of a female candidate, citing Delga, Clémentine Autain, and herself. Former CFDT leader Laurent Berger was also proposed by Glucksmann and Sandrine Rousseau. On 22 June, a LegiTrack poll by OpinionWay-Vae Solis for Les Echos and Radio Classique showed that in the event of the Front's victory, the French would prefer a prime minister from the Socialist Party (at 44 percent) rather than from La France Insoumise (at 25 percent).

Of the 546 candidates for the Front, 229 were from La France Insoumise, 175 from the Socialist Party, 92 from the Ecologists, and 50 from the French Communist Party, reflecting the Socialist Party's resurgence. After its establishment, polling showed that 25 to 28 percent of likely voters backed the Front, behind the 31 percent who supported the National Rally but ahead of Macron and his allies, estimated to be below 20 percent; a mid-June IFOP poll similarly showed a gridlock situation, with the Front at 29 percent, behind the National Rally at 34 percent and the presidential camp at 22 percent. In the first round, the Front finished five points behind the National Rally, with Macron and his allies coming a distant third. According to a tracker from the Financial Times, the Front had the second most first-place finishes (156) after the National Rally (296) and before the presidential camp (65). Among these who finished second, the Front had 158 candidates, compared to 154 for Macron's camp and the 117 of the National Rally. Overall, as many as 85 candidates had cleared the 50 percent threshold to win election in the first round, and 291 third-place candidates across the three leading blocs qualified for the second round. Afterwards, attempts were made to build a Republican Front, asking their candidates from three-way races to drop out in order to reduce the likelihood of a National Rally victory in the runoff election.

The Front soon made clear it was willing to withdraw its candidate and support the presidential camp against the far-right where it had little likelihood of victory. In turn, the presidential camp offered to do the same, although Macron's indications were less clear. During the electoral campaign, Macron focused on attacking the left and said that as a general rule his coalition would also withdraw its candidates who had finished third but not always; for example, he said he would evaluate cases where candidates from La France Insoumise came second on an individual basis. Several voters and French newspapers, including Libération and L'Humanité, criticized the presidential camp for this ambiguity. As of 5 July 2024, this Republican Front resulted in the withdrawal of more than 130 of the Front's candidates, along with about 80 candidates of Macron's party and presidential camp. As a result, the Front made it harder for the National Rally to achieve an absolute majority, with the latest polls indicating that while the National Rally was still well positioned to win the most seats in the National Assembly, it might fall short of the 289 needed for an absolute majority.

=== Aftermath ===
According to the final results, the Front obtained 182 seats, ahead of Ensemble with 168 seats and the National Rally plus a minority of The Republicans with 143 seats. Compared to 2022, the Front made significant gains both in terms of votes in the first round and in the number of seats compared to NUPES. On 12 July 2024, a group of dissidents from La France Insoumise announced the formation of a new party named L'Après. The party claimed to be "in service of the New Popular Front".

After the fall of Michael Barnier's government in December 2024, Macron met with the Socialist Party, Ecologists, and Communist Party in talks to propose a solution to the political deadlock. Originally meeting with Olivier Faure, the talks were criticised by Mélenchon for breaking with the alliance's line.

== Members ==
Map of constituencies by the primary party affiliation of New Popular Front candidates

=== Political parties ===
Party	Abbr.	Ideology	Political position	Leader(s)	Seats in the National Assembly
La France Insoumise and allies
La France Insoumise	LFI	Democratic socialism Left-wing populism	Left-wing to far-left	Jean-Luc Mélenchon; Manuel Bompard	71
Left Party	PG	Democratic socialism Left-wing populism	Left-wing	Éric Coquerel; Danielle Simonnet	20
Debout!	PD	Left-wing populism Economic nationalism Regionalism	Left-wing	François Ruffin	1
Ecological Revolution for the Living	REV	Veganism; Deep ecology	Left-wing	Aymeric Caron	1
Independent Workers' Party	POI	Marxism	Far-left	Collective	1
Rézistans Égalité 974	RÉ974	Democratic socialism Regionalism	Left-wing	Jean-Hugues Ratenon	1
Péyi-A	Péyi-A	Independentism	Centre-left to left-wing	Jean-Philippe Nilor; Marcelin Nadeau	3
Ecosocialist Left	GES	Eco-socialism	Left-wing	Collective	2
For a Popular and Social Ecology	PEPS	Eco-socialism	Left-wing	Collective	1
Les Écologistes and allies
The Ecologists	LE	Green politics Alter-globalization	Centre-left to left-wing	Marine Tondelier	25
Génération·s	G·s	Democratic socialism Eco-socialism; Eurofederalism	Left-wing	Benoît Hamon	6
L'Après	L'A	Democratic socialism Political ecology	Left-wing	Collective leadership	4
Alsatian Alternative	AA	Democratic socialism Regionalism	Left-wing		
Ecology Generation	GE	Green politics Ecofeminism	Left-wing	Delphine Batho	1
Ensemble Sur Nos Territoires	ET	Green politics Regionalism	Left-wing	Ronan Dantec	
Heiura-Les Verts	Heiura	Green politics	Left-wing	Jacky Bryant	
Socialist Party and allies
Socialist Party	PS	Social democracy Pro-Europeanism	Centre-left to left-wing	Olivier Faure	63
Paris in Common	PeC	Social democracy Eco-socialism; Regionalism	Centre-left to left-wing	Anne Hidalgo	
Progressive Democratic Party of Guadeloupe	PPDG	Social democracy Post-Marxism	Centre-left to left-wing	Jacques Bangou	1
Guianese Socialist Party	PSG	Democratic socialism Autonomism	Left-wing	Marie-Josée Lalsie	
Mouvement populaire franciscain	MPF	Autonomism	Left-wing	Maurice Antiste	
Martinican Progressive Party	PPM	Democratic socialism Autonomism	Left-wing	Didier Laguerre	
Build the Martinique Country	BPM	Post-Marxism; Left-wing nationalism	Left-wing	Pierre Samot	
Le Progrès	LP	Social democracy Regionalism	Centre-left	Patrick Lebreton	1
French Communist Party and allies
French Communist Party	PCF	Communism	Left-wing	Fabien Roussel	12
Humains et dignes	HeD	Democratic socialism	Left-wing	Muriel Ressiguier	
Republican and Socialist Left	GRS	Socialism	Left-wing	Emmanuel Maurel	1
The Radicals of the Left	LRDG	Radicalism	Centre-left	Stéphane Saint-André; Isabelle Amaglio-Térisse	
L'Engagement	L'E	Socialism	Centre-left to left-wing	Arnaud Montebourg	
Citizen and Republican Movement	MRC	Left-wing Gaullism; Sovereigntism	Left-wing	Jean-Luc Laurent	
Republic and Socialism	ReS	Left-wing Gaullism; Sovereigntism	Left-wing	Lucien Jallamion	
For Réunion	PLR	Democratic socialism Post-Marxism; Regionalism	Left-wing	Huguette Bello	2
Tāvini Huiraʻatira	TH	Left-wing nationalism Independentism	Centre-left to left-wing	Oscar Temaru	1
Martinican Communist Party	MCP	Communism; Autonomism	Left-wing	Georges Erichot	
Communist Party of Réunion	PCR	Communism; Regionalism	Left-wing	Élie Hoarau	
Decolonization and Social Emancipation Movement	MDES	Marxism; Left-wing nationalism	Far-left	Fabien Canavy	1
Guadeloupe Communist Party	PCG	Communism; Autonomism	Left-wing	Alain-Félix Flémin	
Martinican Independence Movement	MIM	Left-wing nationalism Decolonization	Left-wing	Alfred Marie-Jeanne	
Martinican Democratic Rally	RDM	Social democracy Autonomism	Left-wing	Claude Lise	
Others
New Anticapitalist Party – The Anticapitalist	NPA–B	Socialism; Anti-capitalism	Far-left	Collective leadership	1
New Deal	ND	Progressivism	Centre-left to left-wing	Arnaud Lelache; Aline Mouquet	
Movement of Progressives	MdP	Progressivism	Centre-left to left-wing	François Béchieau	
Allons enfants	AE	Social liberalism	Centre-left	Félix David-Rivière	
Pirate Party	PP	Pirate politics Civil libertarianism	Syncretic	Collective leadership	
Walwari		Democratic socialism Social democracy Autonomism	Centre-left to left-wing	Christiane Taubira	
Breton Democratic Union	UDB	Breton nationalism Left-wing nationalism	Left-wing	Tifenn Siret; Pierre-Emmanuel Marais	
Euskal Herria Bai	EHBai	Abertzale left	Left-wing		1
Inseme a Manca	IaM	Socialism; Eco-socialism	Left-wing		
Ghjuventù di Manca	GdM	Green politics Social justice	Left-wing		
A Manca	AM	Left-wing nationalism Corsican autonomism	Left-wing		
Union pour la Sécurité de Mayotte	USM	Regionalism	Left-wing		
Ecologia Sulidaria	ES	Green politics	Left-wing		

==== Former ====
Party	Abbr.	Ideology	Political position	Leader(s)	Seats in the National Assembly
Place Publique	PP	Social democracy	Centre-left	Aurore Lalucq; Raphaël Glucksmann	2
Democratic and Social Left (merged into L'Après the first of february 2025)	GDS	Democratic socialism	Left-wing	Gérard Filoche	
Ensemble! (merged into L'Après in late 2025)	E!	Socialism; Eco-socialism	Left-wing	Collective leadership	

=== Trade unions ===
Union Confederation	Abbr.	Leader(s)
General Confederation of Labour	CGT	Sophie Binet
French Democratic Confederation of Labour	CFDT	Marylise Léon
National Union of Autonomous Trade Unions	UNSA	Laurent Escure
Fédération Syndicale Unitaire	FSU	Benoît Teste
Union syndicale Solidaires	SUD	Julie Ferrua and Murielle Guilbert

=== Organizations ===
Organization	Abbr.	Ideology	Political position	Leader(s)
Association for the Taxation of Financial Transactions and for Citizens' Action	ATTAC	Alter-globalization; Tobin tax	Left-wing	Collective leadership
Jeune Garde Antifasciste	JGA	Anti-fascism	Far-left	Collective leadership
Association Démocratie Écologie Solidarité	ADES	Eco-socialism	Left-wing	Collective leadership

=== External support ===
Party	Abbr.	Ideology	Political position	Leader(s)
Radical Party of the Left	PRG	Social liberalism Radicalism	Centre-left	Guillaume Lacroix
Citizenship, Action, Participation for the 21st Century(Dissolved in Cap Écologie)	Cap21	Green liberalism	Centre	Corinne Lepage

== Election results ==
=== National Assembly ===
National Assembly
Election year	Leader	First round		Second round		Seats	Role in government
Election year	Leader	Votes	%	Votes	%	Seats	Role in government
2024	Collective leadership	9,042,485	28.21%	7,040,198	25.81%	192 / 577	Opposition

== Political platform ==
The Front is described as a broad left-wing alliance, with centre-left to far-left factions. On 14 June, the left-wing party leaders met at a conference centre near the National Assembly to explain in greater detail the 150 measures of Front's political platform, and contains some changes from the 2022 NUPES programme. While the Front has been referred to as far-left by its critics, including Macron and the far-right, its political programme is described by scholars as left-wing. (Note: During the electoral campaign, both the presidential camp and the far right described the Front as far left, owing it to La France Insoumise and now applying it to the Front as a whole. There is no clear consensus among scholars on the far-left and its definition, with some scholars using different definitions but agreeing that there are differences and pluralism within it. According to political science researcher Christine Pina, what distinguishes the mainstream left from the far-left (where despite the oppositions and differences in militant cultures between Trotskyists, Maoists, and libertarian socialists or anarchists, they all share three common denominators that distinguish them from the mainstream left) is that the far-left proposes a sort of maximum programme. In the words of historian Aurélien Dubuisson (associate researcher at The Sciences Po Centre for History and author of The Far Left in France published by the Blaise Pascal University Press) and sociologist Paolo Stuppia (member of the European Centre for Sociology and Political Science), "[w]hile admitting immediate and transitory requests such as that of a better sharing of added value for the benefit of employees, the 'far-left' defends above all a maximalist programme in which the abolition of the capitalist model (today we also speak of fossil capital) occupies a central place. ... However, none on the left, including La France Insoumise, despite its radical criticisms of economic neoliberalism, defends such a process which would consist in a transformation of positive law to organise, even gradually, the disappearance of capitalist exploitation and the competition paradigm". According to Dubuisson, this is "a mistake that has been made in recent years, especially by the right wing of the political spectrum". Dubuisson cites Mitterrand's programme from 1981, which he said would be considered "the worst extremist of the moment. But in 1981, the political context was different, it was permeated by left-wing themes." According to Dubuisson and political scientist Rémi Lefebvre, it is no more radical than Mitterand's. Similarly, in the words of political scientist Christopher Bickerton, the Front's programme echoes the "old Keynesian strategy of boosting aggregate demand through government spending" of Mitterrand's programme of 1981.) Le Monde summarized the Front's political platform as being to the left of Raphaël Glucksmann and to the right of La France Insoumise, with a programme that included left-wing positions on economic and social issues that are shared by all parties but also foreign policy proposals closer to the centre-left and the Socialist Party.

The Front's plan is divided into three phases:

1. The first fifteen days of the Front's government would see a slate of emergency measures, including an increase in after-tax minimum wage to €1,600 per month, price freezes on necessities and energy bills, investment in social housing, and a rejection of deficit spending rules.
2. The first 100 days would lay the groundwork for proposed changes through five legislative packages covering purchasing power, education, healthcare, ecological planning, and the "abolition of billionaire privileges".
3. The months beyond, or transformations, which would foresee the sustainable reinforcement of public services, the right to housing, green reindustrialization, police and criminal justice reforms, and constitutional changes leading to the founding of a French Sixth Republic.

=== Constitutional policy ===
The Front pledged to abolish Article 49.3 of the French Constitution that allows governments to force legislation through the National Assembly without a vote. The Front also pledged to introduce proportional representation for elections in France, such as the National Assembly, and to organise a constituent assembly to prepare a new Constitution of France, moving from the French Fifth Republic to a Sixth Republic.

=== Economic policy ===
The Front supports a retirement age of 60 and the repeal of the controversial 2023 French pension reform law and reverse the unpopular reform of unemployment benefits pushed by Macron's government. The Front also supports introduction of menstrual leave, and a 14 percent increase in the minimum wage, adjusting salaries and pensions with the inflation rate and freezing food and energy prices to boost the purchasing power of its citizens. Additionally, the Front would re-introduce the solidarity tax on wealth that had been abolished in 2017 by Macron's government, as well as introduce a new tax on excess profits, and raising the Generalized Social Contribution paid by the richest taxpayers. In contrast to the criticized economic policies of the National Rally even as Marine Le Pen reassured business, the Front described its economic plans as more responsible because its increased spending would be paid for by billions of euros in planned tax rises. Olivier Faure, the Socialist Party leader, said: "We will finance this programme by dipping into the pockets of those who can most afford it."

=== Education policy ===
The Front pledged to make school lunches and supplies free. It also pledged to abolish the Parcoursup university admissions system.

=== Foreign policy ===
The Front supports Ukraine and its defense against Russian aggression, including military aid, calling upon France and the West to support Ukraine more, while committing against any direct intervention by the French military. It also supports cancelling debt and seizing assets in France of Russian oligarchs. Within the framework of a two-state solution, the Front's platform calls for France to recognize the State of Palestine, and enforce an arms embargo against Israel, while it describes the 7 October attacks as terrorist massacres. The platform opposes war, antisemitism, Islamophobia, the hostage situation, and Hamas' theocracy.

=== Immigration ===
In contrast to the far-right, which proposed to drastically cut immigration, the Front pledged to make the asylum process more generous and smooth, reversing the 2023 immigration law.

=== Social policy ===
The Front pledged to introduce gender self-determination. It also pledged to abolish the General National Service.

== Reactions ==
=== From the left ===
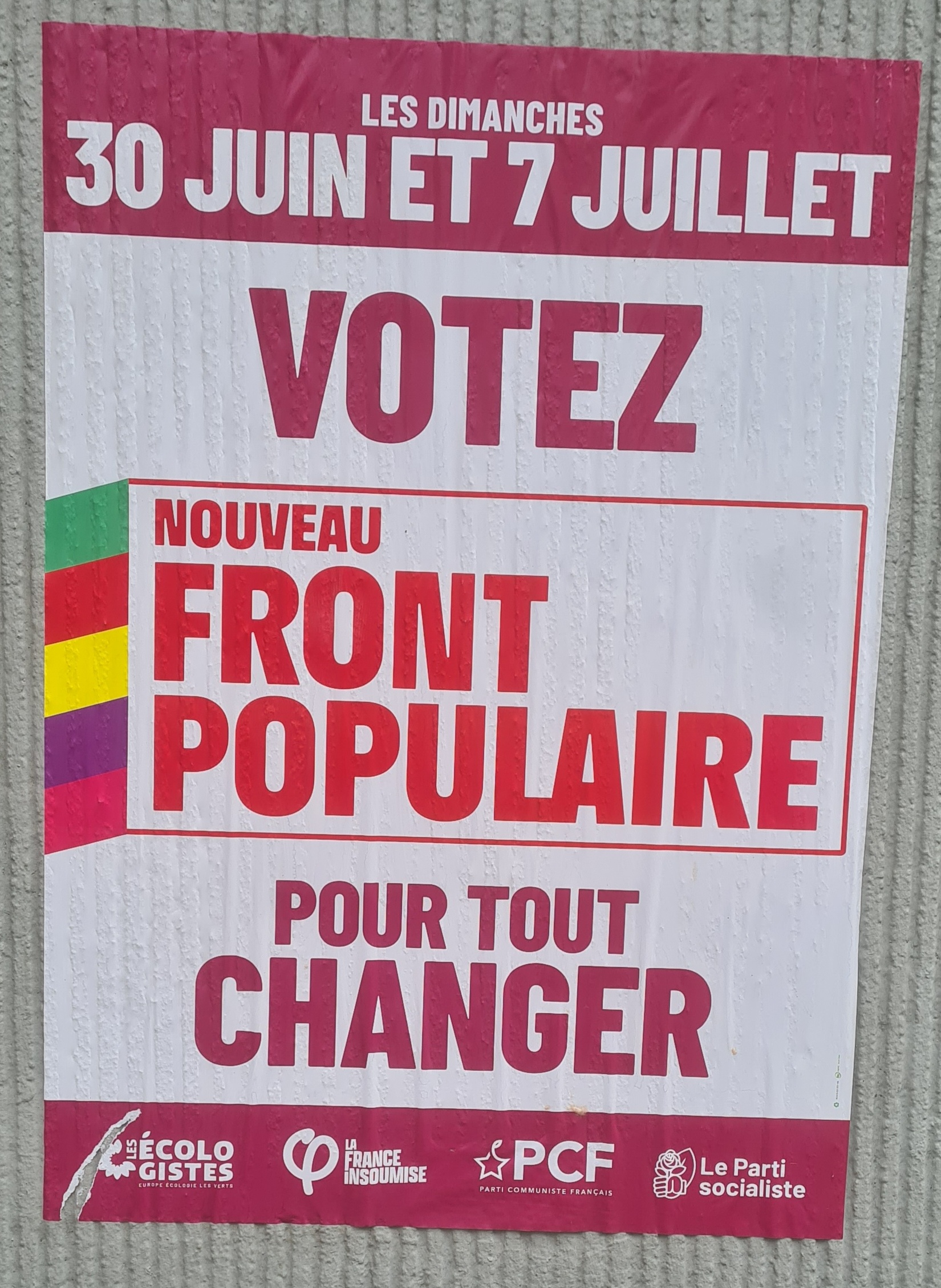
Poster of the New Popular Front

On 11 June, Kamel Chibli, a Socialist Party member and the vice president of the Occitanie region, opposed the agreement, accusing it of being a NUPES 2. Former French president François Hollande, who had been an opponent of NUPES and La France Insoumise, announced that he supported the Front, and was later confirmed as a candidate for the alliance in Corrèze's 1st constituency, a seat he had held from 1988 until his election to the presidency in 2012. Raphaël Glucksmann, leader of Place Publique and member of the European Parliament who was initially cautious about supporting the alliance, ultimately announced his support of it on 14 June.

The socialist magazine Jacobin praised the surprising reunion of the left-wing forces after internal competition in the European elections, and analyzed the controversial decision by La France Insoumise to purge certain candidates, which ignited significant internal criticism. Candidates like Alexis Corbière and Raquel Garrido argued for reconciliation with other left-wing forces. Party leader Jean-Luc Mélenchon faced backlash from both members and allies, who said the move was autocratic and damaged party unity. Critics contended that the purge was an attempt to centralize power and stifle dissenting voices within the party. This internal conflict highlighted broader issues within the Front, as the need for unity against the far-right was undermined by such divisive actions, threatening the effectiveness and cohesion of the left-wing alliance.

=== From centrists and others ===
French president Emmanuel Macron and its coalition focused on attacking the Front more than the National Rally, hoping to split the vote of the French left. Some observers criticized this strategy, calling it confusing and controversial, as France has a long history of Republican fronts and cordon sanitaire, where all democratic political forces try to collaborate to stem the rise of the far-right. According to some critics, by attacking the French left and the Front over the National Rally, Macron was helping the far-right advance rather than opposing it. For example, some of Macron's reactions, such as criticism of the Front for advocating a pro-immigration programme, were seen as echoing the far-right's talking points and rhetoric. Macron further criticized some of their proposals, such as allowing trans people to record their gender change on their marital status by visiting the town hall.

Former French prime minister Manuel Valls, a former member of the Socialist Party who had joined Renaissance and was an opponent of NUPES in 2022, denounced the agreement. Bruno Le Maire, the Minister of Economics and Finance and member of Renaissance, criticized the practicality of the Front's programme. French prime minister Gabriel Attal, also of Renaissance, called the Front "an agreement of shame". Macron judged the Front's programme to be four-time worse than the National Rally's, saying that there would be "no more laïcité, they will go back on the immigration law, and there are things that are completely grotesque like changing your gender at the town hall."

Volt France, a liberal Eurofederalist party, criticized the agreement, and echoed Glucksmann's call for another front uniting all republican and pro-European forces. Guillaume Lacroix, the leader of the Radical Party of the Left, announced that while his party was not part of the agreement, they would support "left-wing [candidates] who share its republican, secular and universalist values as well as all Republican candidates capable of beating the [National Rally]." Cap21 proposed uniting the left, centre and ecologists. Unser Land, which is a member of Régions et Peuples Solidaires along with the Breton Democratic Union and Euskal Herria Bai, announced an independent candidacy, saying that only their candidates support "an autonomous Alsace in a federal France" and that "Macron is a Jacobin, Le Pen and Mélenchon even more so".
