= List of constituencies of the National Assembly of France =

Image of the 577 legislative circonscriptions or constituencies in France (after 2012).

France is divided into 577 constituencies (circonscriptions) for the election of deputies to the lower legislative House, the National Assembly (539 in Metropolitan France, 27 in the overseas departments and territories, and 11 for French residents overseas). Deputies are elected in a two round system to a term fixed to a maximum of five years.

In 2010, a new set of constituency boundaries was adopted, with the dual purpose of ensuring a more equal number of voters per constituency, and of providing seats in the National Assembly to representatives of French citizens resident outside France. 33 constituencies were abolished, and 33 new ones created. Of the latter, 17 are in metropolitan France, five are in overseas France, while the rest of the world was divided into 11 constituencies for French residents overseas. These new constituencies were contested for the first time in the National Assembly elections of June 2012.

== Metropolitan France: 539 constituencies ==
=== Ain (01) – 5 constituencies ===
Constituency	Member	2024	Voters	2022	2017	2012	2007	2002	1997	1993	1988
Ain's 1st	Xavier Breton	LR	86,194	LR	LR	UMP	UMP	UMP	PS	RPR	RPR
Ain's 2nd	Romain Daubié	MoDem	99,979	MoDem	LR	UMP	UMP	UMP	RPR	RPR	RPR
Ain's 3rd	Olga Givernet	RE	82,207	RE	LREM	UMP	UMP	UMP	DVD	UDF	UDF
Ain's 4th	Jérôme Buisson	RN	94,903	RN	LREM	UMP	UMP	UMP	UDF	UDF	UDF
Ain's 5th	Marc Chavent	LR (UXD)	77,466	DVD	LR	UMP	Constituency created for 2012 election				

=== Aisne (02) – 5 constituencies ===
Constituency	Member	2024	Voters	2022	2017	2012	2007	2002	1997	1993	1988
Aisne's 1st	Nicolas Dragon	RN	72,483	RN	LREM	DVG	DVG	PS	PS	RPR	PS
Aisne's 2nd	Julien Dive	LR	73,189	LR	LR	UMP	UMP	UMP	PS	UDF	PCF
Aisne's 3rd	Eddy Casterman	EXD	66,718	PS	PS	PS	PS	PS	PS	PS	PS
Aisne's 4th	José Beaurain	RN	78,778	RN	LREM	MRC	FG	MDC	MDC	UDF	PS
Aisne's 5th	Jocelyn Dessigny	RN	83,139	RN	LREM	PRG	UMP	UMP	UDF	UDF	PS

=== Allier (03) – 3 constituencies ===
Constituency	Member	2024	Voters	2022	2017	2012	2007	2002	1997	1993	1988
Allier's 1st	Yannick Monnet	PCF	89,355	PCF	PCF	DVG	DVG	UMP	PS	RPR	PS
Allier's 2nd	Jorys Bovet	RN	80,971	RN	LREM	PS	PS	PCF	PCF	UDF	PCF
Allier's 3rd	Nicolas Ray	LR	80,195	LR	LREM	PRG	PS	UMP	PCF	UDF	PCF

=== Alpes-de-Haute-Provence (04) – 2 constituencies ===
Constituency	Member	2024	Voters	2022	2017	2012	2007	2002	1997	1993	1988
Alpes-de-Haute-Provence's 1st	Christian Girard	RN	61,975	RN	LREM	PS	PS	PS	PS	RPR	PS
Alpes-de-Haute-Provence's 2nd	Sophie Vaginay-Ricourt	RN	66,651	LFI	LREM	PS	UMP	UMP	PRS	RPR	PS

=== Hautes-Alpes (05) – 2 constituencies ===
Constituency	Member	2024	Voters	2022	2017	2012	2007	2002	1997	1993	1988
Hautes-Alpes's 1st	Marie-José Allemand	PS	59,647	LREM	LREM	PS	UMP	UMP	PS	RPR	PS
Hautes-Alpes's 2nd	Valérie Rossi	PS	54,278	LREM	LREM	PRG	PRG	PRG	RPR	RPR	RPR

=== Alpes-Maritimes (06) – 9 constituencies ===
Constituency	Member	2024	Voters	2022	2017	2012	2007	2002	1997	1993	1988
Alpes-Maritimes's 1st	Éric Ciotti	LR (UXD)	82,309	LR	LR	UMP	UMP	UMP	UDF	UDF	UDF
Alpes-Maritimes's 2nd	Lionel Tivoli	RN	89,181	RN	LREM	UMP	UMP	UMP	RPR	RPR	RPR
Alpes-Maritimes's 3rd	Bernard Chaix	LR (UXD)	91,815	LREM	LREM	NC	NC	UDF	UDF	UDF	UDF
Alpes-Maritimes's 4th	Alexandra Masson	RN	85,291	RN	LREM	UMP	UMP	UMP	RPR	RPR	RPR
Alpes-Maritimes's 5th	Christelle d'Intorni	LR (UXD)	91,177	LR	LR	UMP	UMP	UMP	RPR	RPR	RPR
Alpes-Maritimes's 6th	Bryan Masson	RN	80,177	RN	LR	UMP	UMP	UMP	RPR	RPR	RPR
Alpes-Maritimes's 7th	Éric Pauget	LR	97,545	LR	LR	UMP	UMP	UMP	UDF	UDF	UDF
Alpes-Maritimes's 8th	Alexandra Martin	LR	84,308	LR	LR	UMP	UMP	UMP	UDF	UDF	UDF
Alpes-Maritimes's 9th	Michèle Tabarot	LR	81,467	LR	LR	UMP	UMP	UMP	EELV	RPR	RPR

=== Ardèche (07) – 3 constituencies ===
Constituency	Member	2024	Voters	2022	2017	2012	2007	2002	1997	1993	1988
Ardèche's 1st	Hervé Saulignac	PS	79,312	PS	PS	PS	PS	PS	PS	UDF	PS
Ardèche's 2nd	Vincent Trébuchet	LR (UXD)	96,581	LREM	PS	PS	PS	UMP	PRS	RPR	RPR
Ardèche's 3rd	Fabrice Brun	LR	80,836	LR	LR	PS	UMP	UMP	PS	RPR	PS

=== Ardennes (08) – 3 constituencies ===
Constituency	Member	2024	Voters	2022	2017	2012	2007	2002	1997	1993	1988
Ardennes's 1st	Flavien Termet	RN	70,967	LREM	LR	UMP	UMP	UMP	PS	UDF	PS
Ardennes's 2nd	Pierre Cordier	LR	60,754	LR	LR	PS	PS	PS	PS	UDF	PS
Ardennes's 3rd	Jean-Luc Warsmann	DVD	55,262	DVD	LR	UMP	UMP	UMP	RPR	DVD	PS

=== Ariège (09) – 2 constituencies ===
Constituency	Member	2024	Voters	2022	2017	2012	2007	2002	1997	1993	1988
Ariège's 1st	Martine Froger	PS	57,472	LFI	LFI	PS	PS	PS	PS	PS	PS
Ariège's 2nd	Laurent Panifous	PS	62,032	DVG	LFI	PS	PS	PS	PS	RAD	PS

=== Aube (10) – 3 constituencies ===
Constituency	Member	2024	Voters	2022	2017	2012	2007	2002	1997	1993	1988
Aube's 1st	Jordan Guitton	RN	64,552	RN	LREM	UMP	UMP	UMP	UDF	UDF	UDF
Aube's 2nd	Valérie Bazin-Malgras	LR	75,273	LR	LR	UMP	UMP	UMP	RPR	RPR	RPR
Aube's 3rd	Angélique Ranc	RN	66,562	RN	LR	UMP	UMP	UMP	RPR	RPR	PS

=== Aude (11) – 3 constituencies ===
Constituency	Member	2024	Voters	2022	2017	2012	2007	2002	1997	1993	1988
Aude's 1st	Christophe Barthès	RN	99,232	RN	LREM	PS	PS	PS	PS	UDF	PS
Aude's 2nd	Frédéric Falcon	RN	92,846	RN	LREM	PS	PS	PS	PS	RPR	PS
Aude's 3rd	Julien Rancoule	RN	89,852	RN	LREM	PS	PS	PS	PS	RPR	PS

=== Aveyron (12) – 3 constituencies ===
Constituency	Member	2024	Voters	2022	2017	2012	2007	2002	1997	1993	1988
Aveyron's 1st	Stéphane Mazars	RE	78,351	LREM	LREM	UMP	UMP	UMP	UDF	UDF	UDF
Aveyron's 2nd	Laurent Alexandre	LFI	68,221	LFI	LREM	PS	PS	UMP	PRS	UDF	MRG
Aveyron's 3rd	Jean-François Rousset	RE	72,268	LREM	LR	UMP	UMP	UMP	RPR	RPR	RPR

=== Bouches-du-Rhône (13) – 16 constituencies ===
Constituency	Member	2024	Voters	2022	2017	2012	2007	2002	1997	1993	1988
Bouches-du-Rhône's 1st	Monique Griseti	RN	82,816	LREM	LR	UMP	UMP	UMP	UDF	UDF	UDF
Bouches-du-Rhône's 2nd	Laurent Lhardit	PS	84,461	LREM	LREM	UMP	UMP	UMP	UDF	UDF	UDF
Bouches-du-Rhône's 3rd	Gisèle Lelouis	RN	77,883	RN	LREM	PS	UMP	UMP	UDF	UDF	PS
Bouches-du-Rhône's 4th	Manuel Bompard	LFI	67,303	LFI	LFI	PS	PS	PCF	PCF	PCF	PCF
Bouches-du-Rhône's 5th	Hendrik Davi	DVG	75,491	LFI	LREM	PS	UMP	UMP	RPR	RPR	PS
Bouches-du-Rhône's 6th	Olivier Fayssat	UXD	79,715	LREM	LR	UMP	UMP	UMP	UDF	UDF	UDF
Bouches-du-Rhône's 7th	Sébastien Delogu	LFI	69,089	LFI	LREM	PS	PS	PS	PS	RPR	PS
Bouches-du-Rhône's 8th	Romain Tonussi	RN	103,695	LREM	LREM	PS	UMP	PS	PS	PS	PS
Bouches-du-Rhône's 9th	Joëlle Mélin	RN	101,449	RN	LR	UMP	UMP	UMP	PCF	PCF	PCF
Bouches-du-Rhône's 10th	José Gonzalez	RN	110,783	RN	LREM	EELV	UMP	UMP	PCF	PRG	PS
Bouches-du-Rhône's 11th	Mohamed Laqhila	PS	93,657	MoDem	MoDem	UMP	UMP	UMP	UDF	UDF	UDF
Bouches-du-Rhône's 12th	Franck Allisio	RN	95,365	RN	LR	PS	UMP	UMP	PS	PS	PS
Bouches-du-Rhône's 13th	Emmanuel Fouquart	RN	94,828	PCF	PCF	FG	PCF	PCF	PCF	UDF	PCF
Bouches-du-Rhône's 14th	Gérault Verny	UXD	99,995	LREM	LREM	PS	UMP	UMP	RPR	RPR	UDF
Bouches-du-Rhône's 15th	Romain Baubry	RN	110,725	RN	LR	UMP	UMP	UMP	RPR	RPR	RPR
Bouches-du-Rhône's 16th	Emmanuel Taché de la Pagerie	RN	91,707	RN	LREM	PS	PS	UMP	PS	RPR	PS

=== Calvados (14) – 6 constituencies ===
Constituency	Member	2024	Voters	2022	2017	2012	2007	2002	1997	1993	1988
Calvados's 1st	Joël Bruneau	DVD	72,799	LREM	LREM	PS	PS	UMP	PS	UDF	UDF
Calvados's 2nd	Arthur Delaporte	PS	68,628	PS	PS	PS	PS	UDF	PS	PS	PS
Calvados's 3rd	Jérémie Patrier-Letius	HOR	79,782	LREM	LR	PS	NC	UDF	PS	RPR	PS
Calvados's 4th	Christophe Blanchet	LREM	104,666	LREM	LREM	UMP	UMP	UMP	UDF	UDF	UDF
Calvados's 5th	Bertrand Bouyx	LREM	92,542	LREM	LREM	EELV	UMP	UMP	PS	UDF	UDF
Calvados's 6th	Élisabeth Borne	LREM	96,463	LREM	LREM	PRG	UMP	UMP	PRG	UDF	UDF

=== Cantal (15) – 2 constituencies ===
Constituency	Member	2024	Voters	2022	2017	2012	2007	2002	1997	1993	1988
Cantal's 1st	Vincent Descœur	LR	62,321	LR	LR	PS	UMP	UMP	UDF	UDF	UDF
Cantal's 2nd	Jean-Yves Bony	LR	52,307	LR	LR	UMP	UMP	UMP	RPR	RPR	RPR

=== Charente (16) – 3 constituencies ===
Constituency	Member	2024	Voters	2022	2017	2012	2007	2002	1997	1993	1988
Charente's 1st	René Pilato	LFI	84,238	HOR	LREM	PS	PS	PS	PS	UDF	UDF
Charente's 2nd	Sandra Marsaud	RE	83,330	LREM	LREM	PS	PS	UMP	PS	RPR	RPR
Charente's 3rd	Caroline Colombier	RN	90,677	RN	PS	PS	PS	PS	PS	RPR	PS

=== Charente-Maritime (17) – 5 constituencies ===
Constituency	Member	2024	Voters	2022	2017	2012	2007	2002	1997	1993	1988
Charente-Maritime's 1st	Olivier Falorni	DVG	110,470	DVG	DVG	DVG	PS	PS	PRS	RPR	MRG
Charente-Maritime's 2nd	Benoît Biteau	LE	112,184	RE	LREM	PS	UMP	UMP	PS	UDF	UDF
Charente-Maritime's 3rd	Fabrice Barusseau	PS	84,195	RE	LREM	PS	PS	UMP	PS	UDF	PS
Charente-Maritime's 4th	Pascal Markowsky	RN	94,408	RE	LREM	UMP	UMP	UMP	UDF	UDF	PS
Charente-Maritime's 5th	Christophe Plassard	RE	119,750	RE	LR	UMP	UMP	UMP	RPR	RPR	RPR

=== Cher (18) – 3 constituencies ===
Constituency	Member	2024	Voters	2022	2017	2012	2007	2002	1997	1993	1988
Cher's 1st	François Cormier-Bouligeon	RE	70,391	LREM	LREM	UMP	UMP	UMP	RPR	UDF	UDF
Cher's 2nd	Nicolas Sansu	PCF	68,481	PCF	MoDem	PCF	PCF	PCF	PCF	UDF	PCF
Cher's 3rd	Loïc Kervran	HOR	83,666	LREM	LREM	PS	UMP	UMP	PS	RPR	DVG

=== Corrèze (19) – 2 constituencies ===
Constituency	Member	2024	Voters	2022	2017	2012	2007	2002	1997	1993	1988
Corrèze's 1st	Francois Hollande	PS	91,753	LR	LREM	PS	PS	PS	PS	RPR	PS
Corrèze's 2nd	Frédérique Meunier	LR	93,279	LR	LR	PS	PS	UMP	PS	RPR	DVD

=== Haute-Corse (2B) – 2 constituencies ===
Constituency	Member	2024	Voters	2022	2017	2012	2007	2002	1997	1993	1988
Haute-Corse's 1st	Michel Castellani	FaC	61,520	FaC	PaC	UMP	UMP	PRG	PRS	MRG	MRG
Haute-Corse's 2nd	Jean-Félix Acquaviva	FaC	67,924	FaC	PaC	PRG	PRG	PRG	UDF	RPR	RPR

=== Corse-du-Sud (2A) – 2 constituencies ===
Constituency	Member	2024	Voters	2022	2017	2012	2007	2002	1997	1993	1988
Corse-du-Sud's 1st	Laurent Marcangeli	H	52,261	LREM	LR	UMP	DVG	DVG	UDF	UDF	UDF
Corse-du-Sud's 2nd	Paul-André Colombani	PNC	61,834	PNC	PaC	UMP	UMP	UMP	RPR	RPR	RPR

=== Côte-d'Or (21) – 5 constituencies ===
Constituency	Member	2024	Voters	2022	2017	2012	2007	2002	1997	1993	1988
Côte-d'Or's 1st	Océane Godard	PS	70,511	LREM	LREM	PS	UMP	UMP	RPR	RPR	RPR
Côte-d'Or's 2nd	Catherine Hervieu	LE	72,032	LREM	LR	UMP	UMP	UMP	RPR	RPR	RPR
Côte-d'Or's 3rd	Pierre Pribetich	PS	72,452	LREM	LREM	PS	PS	PS	PS	CNIP	PS
Côte-d'Or's 4th	Hubert Brigand	LR	67,452	LR	LREM	NC	NC	UDF	UDF	UDF	UDF
Côte-d'Or's 5th	René Lioret	RN	85,576	LREM	LREM	UMP	UMP	UMP	PS	RPR	PS

=== Côtes-d'Armor (22) – 5 constituencies ===
Constituency	Member	2024	Voters	2022	2017	2012	2007	2002	1997	1993	1988
Côtes-d'Armor's 1st	Mickaël Cosson	MoDem	90,642	MoDem	MoDem	PS	PS	PS	PS	RPR	PS
Côtes-d'Armor's 2nd	Hervé Berville	RE	104,528	LREM	LREM	PS	PS	PS	PS	PS	PS
Côtes-d'Armor's 3rd	Coretin Le Fur	LR	89,422	LR	LR	UMP	UMP	UMP	PS	RPR	PS
Côtes-d'Armor's 4th	Murielle Lepvraud	LFI	81,561	LFI	DVG	PS	PS	PCF	RPR	PS	
Côtes-d'Armor's 5th	Éric Bothorel	RE	107,757	LREM	LREM	PS	PS	PS	PS	UDF	PS

=== Creuse (23) – 1 constituency ===
Constituency	Member	2024	Voters	2022	2017	2012	2007	2002	1997	1993	1988
Creuse's constituency	Bartolomé Lenoir	UXD	89,953	LFI	LREM	PS	PS	PS	PS	RPR	PS

=== Dordogne (24) – 4 constituencies ===
Constituency	Member	2024	Voters	2022	2017	2012	2007	2002	1997	1993	1988
Dordogne's 1st	Nadine Lechon	RN	78,107	LFI	LREM	PS	PS	PS	PS	RPR	PS
Dordogne's 2nd	Serge Muller	RN	84,293	RN	LREM	EELV	UMP	UMP	MDC	RPR	PS
Dordogne's 3rd	Florence Joubert	RN	66,951	MoDem	MoDem	PS	PS	UMP	PCF	RPR	MRG
Dordogne's 4th	Sébastien Peytavie	LE	89,951	G.s	LREM	PS	PS	PS	PS	RPR	PS

=== Doubs (25) – 5 constituencies ===
Constituency	Member	2024	Voters	2022	2017	2012	2007	2002	1997	1993	1988
Doubs's 1st	Laurent Croizier	MoDEM	75,796	LREM	LREM	PS	UMP	UMP	PS	RPR	PS
Doubs's 2nd	Dominique Voynet	LE	78,894	LREM	LREM	EELV	UMP	UMP	PS	UDF	UDF
Doubs's 3rd	Matthieu Bloch	UXD	64,751	LREM	LREM	UMP	UMP	UMP	PS	RPR	PS
Doubs's 4th	Géraldine Grangier	RN	65,484	RN	LREM	PS	PS	UMP	PS	RPR	DVG
Doubs's 5th	Annie Genevard	LR	85,273	LR	LR	UMP	UMP	UMP	RPR	RPR	RPR

=== Drôme (26) – 4 constituencies ===
Constituency	Member	2024	Voters	2022	2017	2012	2007	2002	1997	1993	1988
Drôme's 1st	Paul Christophle	PS	77,957	LREM	LREM	UMP	UMP	UMP	Eco	RPR	PS
Drôme's 2nd	Lisette Pollet	RN	97,164	RN	LREM	UMP	UMP	PS	PS	UDF	PS
Drôme's 3rd	Marie Pochon	LE	110,848	EELV	LREM	UMP	UMP	UMP	PS	UDF	PS
Drôme's 4th	Thibaut Monnier	RN	99,201	LR	LR	PS	UMP	UMP	PS	UDF	UDF

=== Eure (27) – 5 constituencies ===
Constituency	Member	2024	Voters	2022	2017	2012	2007	2002	1997	1993	1988
Eure's 1st	Christine Loir	RN	87,406	RN	LREM	UMP	UMP	UMP	RPR	RPR	RPR
Eure's 2nd	Katiana Levavasseur	RN	79,125	RN	LREM	PS	UMP	UMP	PS	RPR	PS
Eure's 3rd	Kévin Mauvieux	RN	85,653	RN	LREM	NC	NC	UDF	UDF	UDF	UDF
Eure's 4th	Philippe Brun	PS	93,488	PS	LREM	PS	PS	PS	PS	UDF	PS
Eure's 5th	Timothée Houssin	RN	89,826	RN	LREM	UMP	UMP	UMP	PS	RPR	PS

=== Eure-et-Loir (28) – 4 constituencies ===
Constituency	Member	2024	Voters	2022	2017	2012	2007	2002	1997	1993	1988
Eure-et-Loir's 1st	Guillaume Kasbarian	RE	91,587	LREM	LREM	UMP	UMP	UMP	PS	RPR	PS
Eure-et-Loir's 2nd	Olivier Marleix	LR	75,580	LR	LR	UMP	UMP	UMP	RPR	RPR	RPR
Eure-et-Loir's 3rd	Harold Huwart	PRV	71,161	H	LR	UMP	UMP	UMP	MRG	UDF	PS
Eure-et-Loir's 4th	Philippe Vigier	MoDem	67,367	MoDem	UDI	NC	NC	UMP	EELV	UDF	UDF

=== Finistère (29) – 8 constituencies ===
Constituency	Member	2024	Voters	2022	2017	2012	2007	2002	1997	1993	1988
Finistère's 1st	Annaïg Le Meur	RE	92,349	LREM	LREM	PS	PS	UMP	RPR	RPR	PS
Finistère's 2nd	Pierre-Yves Cadalen	LFI	78,185	DVC	LREM	PS	PS	PS	PS	RPR	PS
Finistère's 3rd	Didier Le Gac	RE	93,868	LREM	LREM	DVG	UMP	UMP	PS	RPR	RPR
Finistère's 4th	Sandrine Le Feur	RE	84,354	LREM	LREM	PS	PS	PS	PS	UDF	PS
Finistère's 5th	Graziella Melchior	RE	98,771	LREM	LREM	PS	UMP	UMP	RPR	RPR	RPR
Finistère's 6th	Mélanie Thomin	PS	91,537	PS	LREM	PS	UMP	UMP	PS	UDF	UDF
Finistère's 7th	Liliane Tanguy	RE	83,676	LREM	LREM	PS	PS	UMP	PS	UDF	UDF
Finistère's 8th	Erwan Balanant	MoDEM	91,749	MoDEM	LREM	PS	PS	PS	PS	PS	PS

=== Gard (30) – 6 constituencies ===
Constituency	Member	2024	Voters	2022	2017	2012	2007	2002	1997	1993	1988
Gard's 1st	Yoann Gillet	RN	90,395	RN	LREM	PS	NC	UDF	PCF	UDF	UDF
Gard's 2nd	Nicolas Meizonnet	RN	96,319	RN	FN	FN	UMP	UMP	PS	UDF	PS
Gard's 3rd	Pascale Bordes	RN	95,973	RN	LREM	PS	UMP	UMP	PS	DVD	PS
Gard's 4th	Pierre Meurin	RN	95,045	RN	LREM	PS	UMP	UMP	PCF	UDF	PCF
Gard's 5th	Alexandre Allegret-Pilot	UXD	98,963	LFI	LREM	PS	PS	PS	PS	RPR	PS
Gard's 6th	Sylvie Josserand	RN	85,592	MoDem	MoDem	EELV	Constituency created for 2012 election				

=== Haute-Garonne (31) – 10 constituencies ===
Constituency	Member	2024	Voters	2022	2017	2012	2007	2002	1997	1993	1988
Haute-Garonne's 1st	Hadrien Clouet	LFI	85,235	LFI	LREM	PS	PS	UMP	UDF	UDF	UDF
Haute-Garonne's 2nd	Anne Stambach-Terrenoir	LFI	106,618	LFI	MoDem	PS	PS	PS	PS	RPR	PS
Haute-Garonne's 3rd	Corinne Vignon	RE	81,918	LREM	LREM	UMP	PS	PS	PS	UDF	PS
Haute-Garonne's 4th	François Piquemal	LFI	69,960	LFI	LREM	PS	PS	UMP	PS	RPR	PS
Haute-Garonne's 5th	Jean-François Portarrieu	RE	108,819	LREM	LREM	PS	PS	PS	PS	RPR	PS
Haute-Garonne's 6th	Arnaud Simion	PS	117,395	LREM	LREM	PS	PS	PS	PS	UDF	PS
Haute-Garonne's 7th	Christophe Bex	LFI	108,255	LFI	LREM	PS	PS	PS	PS	UDF	PS
Haute-Garonne's 8th	Joël Aviragnet	PS	86,059	PS	PS	PS	PS	PS	PS	PS	PS
Haute-Garonne's 9th	Christine Arrighi	LE	81,378	EELV	LREM	PS	Constituency created for 2012 election				
Haute-Garonne's 10th	Jacques Oberti	PS	105,169	LREM	LREM	PS	Constituency created for 2012 election				

=== Gers (32) – 2 constituencies ===
Constituency	Member	2024	Voters	2022	2017	2012	2007	2002	1997	1993	1988
Gers's 1st	Jean-René Cazeneuve	RE	73,224	RE	LREM	PS	PS	PS	PS	RPR	PS
Gers's 2nd	David Taupiac	DVG	73,653	DVG	PS	PS	PS	UMP	PS	UDF	PS

=== Gironde (33) – 12 constituencies ===
Constituency	Member	2024	Voters	2022	2017	2012	2007	2002	1997	1993	1988
Gironde's 1st	Thomas Cazenave	RE	105,877	LREM	LREM	PS	UMP	UMP	RPR	RPR	RPR
Gironde's 2nd	Nicolas Thierry	LE	74,153	EELV	LREM	PS	PS	UMP	RPR	RPR	RPR
Gironde's 3rd	Loïc Prud'homme	LFI	91,664	LFI	LFI	EELV	EELV	EELV	EELV	RPR	PS
Gironde's 4th	Alain David	PS	99,789	PS	PS	PS	PS	PS	PS	PS	PS
Gironde's 5th	Pascale Got	PS	123,080	RN	LREM	PS	PS	UMP	PS	UDF	PS
Gironde's 6th	Marie Recalde	PS	109,035	LREM	LREM	PS	PS	PS	PS	PS	PS
Gironde's 7th	Sébastien Saint-Pasteur	PS	80,696	LREM	LREM	PS	PS	PS	PS	PS	PS
Gironde's 8th	Sophie Panonacle	RE	121,581	LREM	LREM	UMP	UMP	UMP	PS	UDF	UDF
Gironde's 9th	Sophie Mette	MoDem	103,877	MoDem	MoDem	PS	PS	UMP	PS	RPR	PS
Gironde's 10th	Florent Boudié	RE	83,620	LREM	LREM	PS	UMP	UMP	PS	PS	PS
Gironde's 11th	Véronique Hammerer	RN	99,996	RN	LREM	PS	PS	PS	PS	UDF	PS
Gironde's 12th	Mathilde Feld	LFI	89,136	LREM	LREM	PS	Constituency created for 2012 election				

=== Hérault (34) – 9 constituencies ===
Constituency	Member	2024	Voters	2022	2017	2012	2007	2002	1997	1993	1988
Hérault's 1st	Jean-Louis Roumegas	LE	91,374	LREM	LREM	EELV	UMP	UMP	PS	UDF	UDF
Hérault's 2nd	Nathalie Oziol	LFI	67,226	LFI	LFI	PS	PS	UMP	PS	RPR	PS
Hérault's 3rd	Fanny Dombre-Coste	PS	94,060	LREM	LREM	PS	UMP	UMP	PS	RPR	RPR
Hérault's 4th	Manon Bouquin	RN	120,394	LFI	LREM	PS	UMP	UMP	MDC	DVG	PS
Hérault's 5th	Stéphanie Galzy	RN	100,018	RN	LREM	PS	PS	PS	PS	UDF	PS
Hérault's 6th	Julien Gabarron	RN	94,986	EXD	FN	PS	UMP	UMP	PS	UDF	PS
Hérault's 7th	Aurélien Lopez Liguori	RN	110,462	RN	LREM	PS	UMP	PCF	PCF	UDF	PS
Hérault's 8th	Sylvain Carriere	LFI	95,661	LFI	LREM	PS	Constituency created for 2012 election				
Hérault's 9th	Patrick Vignal	UXD	89,433	LREM	LREM	PS	Constituency created for 2012 election				

=== Ille-et-Vilaine (35) – 8 constituencies ===
Constituency	Member	2024	Voters	2022	2017	2012	2007	2002	1997	1993	1988
Ille-et-Vilaine's 1st	Marie Mesmeur	LFI	89,688	LFI	LREM	PS	PS	PS	PS	PS	PS
Ille-et-Vilaine's 2nd	Tristan Lahais	G.s	92,294	MoDem	LREM	PS	PS	PS	PS	RPR	PS
Ille-et-Vilaine's 3rd	François André	PS	86,153	PS	PS	PS	UMP	UMP	PS	UDF	UDF
Ille-et-Vilaine's 4th	Mathilde Hignet	LFI	90,383	LFI	LREM	PS	PS	UMP	UDF	UDF	UDF
Ille-et-Vilaine's 5th	Christine Cloarec	RE	103,298	LREM	UMP	UMP	UMP	UDF	UDF	UDF	
Ille-et-Vilaine's 6th	Thierry Benoit	HOR	86,948	UDI	AC	MoDem	UMP	UDF	UDF	UDF	
Ille-et-Vilaine's 7th	Gilles Lurton	LR	99,142	LR	UMP	UMP	UMP	UDF	UDF	UDF	
Ille-et-Vilaine's 8th	Mickaël Bouloux	PS	91,957	PS	LREM	PS	Constituency created for 2012 election				

=== Indre (36) – 2 constituencies ===
Constituency	Member	2024	Voters	2022	2017	2012	2007	2002	1997	1993	1988
Indre's 1st	François Jolivet	HOR	77,089	HOR	LREM	PS	PS	UMP	PS	DVD	PS
Indre's 2nd	Nicolas Forissier	LR	87,371	LR	LR	PS	UMP	UMP	UDF	UDF	UDF

=== Indre-et-Loire (37) – 5 constituencies ===
Constituency	Member	2024	Voters	2022	2017	2012	2007	2002	1997	1993	1988
Indre-et-Loire's 1st	Charles Fournier	LE	71,989	EELV	LREM	PS	PS	UMP	UDF	UDF	UDF
Indre-et-Loire's 2nd	Daniel Labaronne	RE	93,139	RE	LREM	UMP	UMP	UMP	PS	RPR	RPR
Indre-et-Loire's 3rd	Henri Alfandari	HOR	99,435	HOR	UDI	PS	PS	UDF	PS	UDF	PS
Indre-et-Loire's 4th	Laurent Baumel	PS	92,739	RE	LREM	PS	UMP	UMP	PS	UDF	PS
Indre-et-Loire's 5th	Sabine Thillaye	MoDEM	87,690	MoDEM	LREM	UMP	UMP	UMP	RPR	RPR	PS

=== Isère (38) – 10 constituencies ===
Constituency	Member	2024	Voters	2022	2017	2012	2007	2002	1997	1993	1988
Isère's 1st	Hugo Prevost	LFI	83,946	LREM	LREM	PS	PS	UMP	RPR	RPR	RPR
Isère's 2nd	Cyrielle Chatelain	LE	79,236	EELV	LREM	PS	PS	PCF	PCF	PCF	PS
Isère's 3rd	Élisa Martin	LFI	57,526	LFI	LREM	PS	PS	PS	PS	PS	PS
Isère's 4th	Marie-Noëlle Battistel	PS	92,613	PS	PS	PS	PS	PS	PS	PS	PS
Isère's 5th	Jérémie Iordanoff	LE	106,962	EELV	LREM	PS	PS	PS	PS	RPR	PS
Isère's 6th	Alexis Jolly	RN	91,071	RN	LREM	UMP	UMP	UMP	UDF	UDF	UDF
Isère's 7th	Yannick Neuder	LR	97,024	LR	LREM	UMP	UMP	UMP	UDF	UDF	UDF
Isère's 8th	Hanane Mansouri	UXD	82,869	LREM	LREM	PS	UMP	UMP	PS	UDF	PS
Isère's 9th	Sandrine Nosbé	LFI	101,341	MoDem	MoDem	EELV	PS	PS	PS	UDF	PS
Isère's 10th	Marjolaine Meynier-Millefert	RN	99,416	LREM	LREM	PS	Constituency created for 2012 election				

=== Jura (39) – 3 constituencies ===
Constituency	Member	2024	Voters	2022	2017	2012	2007	2002	1997	1993	1988
Jura's 1st	Danielle Brulebois	RE	64,927	LREM	LREM	UMP	UMP	UMP	RPR	RPR	PS
Jura's 2nd	Marie-Christine Dalloz	LR	55,691	LR	LR	UMP	UMP	UMP	RPR	RPR	RPR
Jura's 3rd	Justine Gruet	LR	70,218	LR	LR	UMP	UMP	UMP	EELV	UDF	PS

=== Landes (40) – 3 constituencies ===
Constituency	Member	2024	Voters	2022	2017	2012	2007	2002	1997	1993	1988
Landes's 1st	Geneviève Darrieussecq	MoDem	109,680	MoDem	MoDem	PS	PS	PS	PS	RPR	PS
Landes's 2nd	Lionel Causse	RE	124,615	LREM	LREM	PS	PS	PS	PS	UDF	PS
Landes's 3rd	Boris Vallaud	PS	100,035	PS	PS	PS	PS	PS	PS	PS	PS

=== Loir-et-Cher (41) – 3 constituencies ===
Constituency	Member	2024	Voters	2022	2017	2012	2007	2002	1997	1993	1988
Loir-et-Cher's 1st	Marc Fesneau	MoDem	82,775	MoDem	MoDem	PS	NC	UDF	PS	PS	PS
Loir-et-Cher's 2nd	Roger Chudeau	RN	80,292	RN	LR	UMP	UMP	UMP	RPR	RPR	PS
Loir-et-Cher's 3rd	Christophe Marion	RE	81,055	LREM	UDI	NC	NC	UDF	UDF	UDF	UDF

=== Loire (42) – 6 constituencies ===
Constituency	Member	2024	Voters	2022	2017	2012	2007	2002	1997	1993	1988
Loire's 1st	Pierrick Courbon	PS	63,990	Agir	PS	PS	PS	UDF	PS	UDF	UDF
Loire's 2nd	Andrée Taurinya	LFI	50,910	LFI	LREM	PS	PS	UMP	RPR	RPR	RPR
Loire's 3rd	Emmanuel Mandon	MoDEM	84,428	MoDEM	LREM	NC	NC	UDF	UDF	UDF	UDF
Loire's 4th	Sylvie Bonnet	LR	104,529	LR	LR	UMP	UMP	UMP	PCF	UDF	PCF
Loire's 5th	Antoine Vermorel-Marques	LR	101,607	LR	MoDem	UMP	UMP	UMP	UDF	UDF	PS
Loire's 6th	Jean-Pierre Taite	LR	111,870	LR	LREM	UMP	UMP	UMP	UDF	UDF	UDF

=== Haute-Loire (43) – 2 constituencies ===
Constituency	Member	2024	Voters	2022	2017	2012	2007	2002	1997	1993	1988
Haute-Loire's 1st	Laurent Wauquiez	LR	102,716	LR	LR	UMP	UMP	UMP	UDF	UDF	UDF
Haute-Loire's 2nd	Jean-Pierre Vigier	LR	79,392	LR	LR	UMP	UMP	UMP	UDF	UDF	UDF

=== Loire-Atlantique (44) – 10 constituencies ===
Constituency	Member	2024	Voters	2022	2017	2012	2007	2002	1997	1993	1988
Loire-Atlantique's 1st	Karim Benbrahim	PS	77,345	LREM	LREM	EELV	EELV	UMP	PS	UDF	UDF
Loire-Atlantique's 2nd	Andy Kerbrat	LFI	91,532	LFI	LREM	PS	PS	PS	PS	RPR	RPR
Loire-Atlantique's 3rd	Ségolène Amiot	LFI	97,410	LFI	LREM	PS	PS	PS	PS	PS	PS
Loire-Atlantique's 4th	Julie Laernoes	LE	93,281	EELV	LREM	PS	PS	PS	PS	PS	PS
Loire-Atlantique's 5th	Fabrice Roussel	PS	128,010	MoDem	MoDem	PS	PS	UMP	UDF	UDF	UDF
Loire-Atlantique's 6th	Jean-Claude Raux	LE	117,326	EELV	LREM	PS	NC	UMP	RPR	RPR	UDF
Loire-Atlantique's 7th	Sandrine Josso	MoDEM	118,962	MoDEM	LREM	UMP	UMP	UMP	PS	RPR	RPR
Loire-Atlantique's 8th	Matthias Tavel	LFI	91,169	LFI	LREM	PS	PS	PS	PS	RPR	PS
Loire-Atlantique's 9th	Jean-Michel Brard	DVD	132,667	MoDem	MoDem	PS	UMP	UMP	UDF	UDF	RPR
Loire-Atlantique's 10th	Sophie Errante	RE	126,356	LREM	LREM	PS	UMP	UMP	RPR	RPR	UDF

=== Loiret (45) – 6 constituencies ===
Constituency	Member	2024	Voters	2022	2017	2012	2007	2002	1997	1993	1988
Loiret's 1st	Stéphanie Rist	RE	78,282	LREM	LREM	UMP	UMP	UMP	UDF	UDF	PS
Loiret's 2nd	Emmanuel Duplessy	G.s	88,623	LREM	LREM	UMP	UMP	UMP	RPR	RPR	RPR
Loiret's 3rd	Constance De Pélichy	DVD	70,459	RN	LR	UMP	UMP	UMP	UDF	UDF	PS
Loiret's 4th	Thomas Ménagé	RN	74,113	RN	LR	UMP	UMP	UMP	RPR	RPR	RPR
Loiret's 5th	Anthony Brosse	RE	73,605	LREM	LR	UMP	UMP	UMP	RPR	RPR	RPR
Loiret's 6th	Richard Ramos	MoDem	76,104	MoDem	MoDem	PS	Constituency created for 2012 election				

=== Lot (46) – 2 constituencies ===
Constituency	Member	2024	Voters	2022	2017	2012	2007	2002	1997	1993	1988
Lot's 1st	Aurélien Pradié	LR	70,805	LR	LR	PRG	PRG	UDF	PRG	MRG	MRG
Lot's 2nd	Christophe Proença	PS	65,345	LREM	LREM	PS	PS	PS	PS	PS	PS

=== Lot-et-Garonne (47) – 3 constituencies ===
Constituency	Member	2024	Voters	2022	2017	2012	2007	2002	1997	1993	1988
Lot-et-Garonne's 1st	Michel Lauzzana	LREM	88,182	LREM	LREM	PS	UDF	UDF	PS	UDF	UDF
Lot-et-Garonne's 2nd	Hélène Laporte	RN	76,963	RN	LREM	PS	UMP	UMP	PS	RPR	PS
Lot-et-Garonne's 3rd	Guillaume Lepers	LR	75,664	RN	LREM	PS	PS	UDF	PS	UDF	PS

=== Lozère (48) – 1 constituency ===
Constituency	Member	2024	Voters	2022	2017	2012	2007	2002	1997	1993	1988
Lozère's constituency	Sophie Pantel	PS	59,436	LR	LR	UMP	UMP	UMP	PS	UDF	UDF

=== Maine-et-Loire (49) – 7 constituencies ===
Constituency	Member	2024	Voters	2022	2017	2012	2007	2002	1997	1993	1988
Maine-et-Loire's 1st	François Gernigon	HOR	84,090	HOR	LREM	PS	UMP	UMP	RPR	RPR	RPR
Maine-et-Loire's 2nd	Stella Dupont	LREM	90,325	LREM	LREM	PS	PS	UMP	UDF	UDF	UDF
Maine-et-Loire's 3rd	Anne-Laure Blin	LR	70,380	LR	LR	UMP	UMP	UMP	UDF	UDF	UDF
Maine-et-Loire's 4th	Laëtitia Saint-Paul	LREM	74,274	LREM	LREM	UMP	UMP	UMP	EELV	UDF	UDF
Maine-et-Loire's 5th	Denis Masséglia	LREM	77,379	LREM	LREM	UMP	UMP	UMP	UDF	UDF	UDF
Maine-et-Loire's 6th	Nicole Dubré-Chirat	LREM	94,693	LREM	LREM	DVG	UMP	UMP	UDF	UDF	UDF
Maine-et-Loire's 7th	Philippe Bolo	MoDem	77,820	MoDem	MoDem	UMP	UMP	UMP	UDF	UDF	UDF

=== Manche (50) – 4 constituencies ===
Constituency	Member	2024	Voters	2022	2017	2012	2007	2002	1997	1993	1988
Manche's 1st	Philippe Gosselin	LR	86,929	LR	LR	UMP	UMP	UMP	RPR	RPR	UDF
Manche's 2nd	Bertrand Sorre	RE	95,481	LREM	LREM	UMP	DVD	UMP	RPR	RPR	RPR
Manche's 3rd	Stéphane Travert	RE	107,801	LREM	LREM	PS	UMP	UMP	RPR	RPR	RPR
Manche's 4th	Anna Pic	PS	88,707	PS	IND	PS	UMP	UMP	UDF	UDF	UDF

=== Marne (51) – 5 constituencies ===
Constituency	Member	2024	Voters	2022	2017	2012	2007	2002	1997	1993	1988
Marne's 1st	Xavier Albertini	HOR	72,128	HOR	LR	UMP	UMP	UMP	RPR	RPR	RPR
Marne's 2nd	Laure Miller	RE	73,131	RN	LREM	UMP	UMP	UMP	RPR	RPR	PS
Marne's 3rd	Maxime Michelet	UDR	80,596	LREM	LREM	UMP	UMP	UMP	RPR	RPR	RPR
Marne's 4th	Lise Magnier	HOR	78,818	HOR	LR	UMP	UMP	UMP	RPR	RPR	RPR
Marne's 5th	Charles de Courson	LC	76,921	LC	UDI	NC	NC	UDF	PS	PS	PS

=== Haute-Marne (52) – 2 constituencies ===
Constituency	Member	2024	Voters	2022	2017	2012	2007	2002	1997	1993	1988
Haute-Marne's 1st	Christophe Bentz	RN	72,405	RN	LREM	UMP	UMP	UMP	DVG	UDF	UDF
Haute-Marne's 2nd	Laurence Robert-Dehault	RN	61,594	RN	LR	UMP	UMP	UMP	RPR	RPR	PS

=== Mayenne (53) – 3 constituencies ===
Constituency	Member	2024	Voters	2022	2017	2012	2007	2002	1997	1993	1988
Mayenne's 1st	Guillaume Garot	PS	72,721	PS	PS	PS	UMP	UMP	UDF	UDF	UDF
Mayenne's 2nd	Géraldine Bannier	MoDem	77,825	MoDem	MoDem	UMP	UMP	UMP	RPR	RPR	RPR
Mayenne's 3rd	Yannick Favennec Becot	HOR	71,930	HOR	UDI	UMP	UMP	UMP	UDF	UDF	UDF

=== Meurthe-et-Moselle (54) – 6 constituencies ===
Constituency	Member	2024	Voters	2022	2017	2012	2007	2002	1997	1993	1988
Meurthe-et-Moselle's 1st	Estelle Mercier	PS	79,290	LREM	LREM	PS	UDF	UDF	PS	UDF	UDF
Meurthe-et-Moselle's 2nd	Stéphane Hablot	PS	68,601	LREM	MoDem	PS	PS	UMP	PS	RPR	RPR
Meurthe-et-Moselle's 3rd	Martine Étienne	LFI	82,580	LFI	LREM	PS	UMP	UMP	UDF	UDF	UDF
Meurthe-et-Moselle's 4th	Thibault Bazin	LR	97,994	LR	LR	UMP	UMP	UMP	RPR	RPR	PS
Meurthe-et-Moselle's 5th	Dominique Potier	PS	78,751	PS	PS	PS	UMP	UMP	PS	UDF	PS
Meurthe-et-Moselle's 6th	Anthony Boulogne	RN	87,545	LFI	LFI	PS	PS	PS	PS	PS	PS

=== Meuse (55) – 2 constituencies ===
Constituency	Member	2024	Voters	2022	2017	2012	2007	2002	1997	1993	1988
Meuse's 1st	Maxime Amblard	RN	77,283	SE	UDI	UDI	UMP	PS	PS	UDF	UDF
Meuse's 2nd	Florence Goulet	RN	60,274	RN	LREM	PS	PS	PS	PS	RPR	PS

=== Morbihan (56) – 6 constituencies ===
Constituency	Member	2024	Voters	2022	2017	2012	2007	2002	1997	1993	1988
Morbihan's 1st	Anne Le Hénanff		105,388	HOR	LREM	DVG	UMP	UMP	LD	UDF	UDF
Morbihan's 2nd	Jimmy Pahun		104,281	MoDem	MoDem	UMP	UMP	UMP	LD	UDF	UDF
Morbihan's 3rd	Nicole Le Peih		90,782	LREM	LREM	PS	UMP	UMP	RPR	RPR	RPR
Morbihan's 4th	Paul Molac		105,109	SE	LREM	DVG	UMP	UMP	UDF	UDF	UDF
Morbihan's 5th	Lysiane Metayer		80,704	LREM	LREM	PS	PS	PS	PS	UDF	PS
Morbihan's 6th	Jean-Michel Jacques		90,701	LREM	LREM	PS	UMP	UMP	UDF	UDF	PS

=== Moselle (57) – 9 constituencies ===
Constituency	Member	2024	Voters	2022	2017	2012	2007	2002	1997	1993	1988
Moselle's 1st	Belkhir Belhaddad		91,439	LREM	LREM	PS	UMP	UMP	PS	RPR	PS
Moselle's 2nd	Ludovic Mendes		76,507	LREM	LREM	UMP	UMP	UMP	UDF	UDF	UDF
Moselle's 3rd	Charlotte Leduc		75,323	LREM	LFI	UMP	UMP	UMP	RPR	RPR	RPR
Moselle's 4th	Fabien Di Filippo		81,476	LR	LR	UMP	UMP	UMP	DVG	DVG	UDF
Moselle's 5th	Vincent Seitlinger		73,972	LR	LREM	UMP	UMP	UMP	PS	UDF	UDF
Moselle's 6th	Kévin Pfeffer		70,132	RN	LREM	PS	UMP	UMP	PS	UDF	PS
Moselle's 7th	Alexandre Loubet		90,360	RN	LREM	PS	UMP	UMP	RPR	RPR	RPR
Moselle's 8th	Laurent Jacobelli		92,436	RN	MoDem	PS	PS	PS	PS	RPR	RPR
Moselle's 9th	Isabelle Rauch		99,470	HOR	LREM	UMP	UMP	UMP	RPR	RPR	RPR

=== Nièvre (58) – 2 constituencies ===
Constituency	Member	2024	Voters	2022	2017	2012	2007	2002	1997	1993	1988
Nièvre's 1st	Perrine Goulet	MoDEM	76,910	LREM	LREM	PS	PS	PS	PS	PS	PS
Nièvre's 2nd	Julien Guibert	RN	82,375	LREM	LREM	PS	PS	PS	PS	UDF	PS

=== Nord (59) – 21 constituencies ===
Constituency	Member	2024	Voters	2022	2017	2012	2007	2002	1997	1993	1988
Nord's 1st	Aurélien Le Coq	LFI	61,729	LFI	LFI	PS	PS	PS	PS	RPR	PS
Nord's 2nd	Ugo Bernalicis	LFI	86,665	LFI	LFI	PS	PS	PS	PS	PS	PS
Nord's 3rd	Sandra Delannoy	RN	94,004	SE	LREM	PS	PS	UMP	PS	RPR	RPR
Nord's 4th	Brigitte Liso	LREM	99,302	LREM	LREM	UMP	UMP	UMP	UDF	UDF	UDF
Nord's 5th	Sébastien Huyghe	SE	99,876	RN	LR	UMP	UMP	UMP	PS	PS	PS
Nord's 6th	Charlotte Lecocq	LREM	89,105	LREM	LREM	UMP	UMP	UMP	RPR	RPR	PS
Nord's 7th	Félicie Gérard	HOR	72,442	HOR	UDI	NC	NC	UMP	EELV	RPR	PS
Nord's 8th	David Guiraud	LFI	67,822	LFI	LREM	DVG	PS	UDF	PS	UDF	UDF
Nord's 9th	Violette Spillebout	LREM	91,618	LREM	LREM	UMP	UMP	UMP	RPR	RPR	RPR
Nord's 10th	Gérald Darmanin	LREM	82,008	LREM	LR	UMP	UMP	UMP	PS	RPR	PS
Nord's 11th	Roger Vicot	PS	92,067	PS	LREM	PS	PS	PS	PS	UDF	PS
Nord's 12th	Michaël Taverne	RN	93,580	RN	LREM	PS	MRC	PS	PS	MRG	PS
Nord's 13th	Julien Gokel	PS	89,284	LREM	MRC	MRC	PS	PS	PS	RPR	PS
Nord's 14th	Paul Christophe	HOR	98,782	AGIR	LR	UMP	UMP	UMP	PS	DVD	RPR
Nord's 15th	Jean-Pierre Bataille	DVD	95,872	RN	LREM	PS	UMP	UMP	PS	RPR	IND
Nord's 16th	Matthieu Marchio	RN	83,023	RN	PCF	PCF	PCF	PCF	PCF	PCF	PCF
Nord's 17th	Thierry Tesson	LR (UXD)	73,599	RN	LREM	FG	PG	PS	PS	RPR	PS
Nord's 18th	Alexandre Dufosset	RN	91,572	UDI	UDI	UDI	DVD	DVD	PS	RPR	PS
Nord's 19th	Sébastien Chenu	RN	79,087	RN	FN	PS	PS	PS	PCF	PCF	PCF
Nord's 20th	Guillaume Florquin	RN	81,103	PCF	PCF	PCF	PCF	PCF	PCF	PCF	PCF
Nord's 21st	Valérie Létard	UDI	82,589	UDI	UDI	UDI	UDF	UMP	UDF	DVD	PCF

=== Oise (60) – 7 constituencies ===
Constituency	Member	2024	Voters	2022	2017	2012	2007	2002	1997	1993	1988
Oise's 1st	Victor Habert-Dassault		82,961	LR	LR	UMP	UMP	UMP	PS	RPR	RPR
Oise's 2nd	Philippe Ballard		88,736	RN	LREM	UMP	UMP	UMP	PS	RPR	RPR
Oise's 3rd	Alexandre Sabatou		73,889	RN	LREM	PS	PS	PS	PS	RPR	PS
Oise's 4th	Éric Woerth		92,500	LREM	LR	UMP	UMP	UMP	RPR	RPR	RPR
Oise's 5th	Pierre Vatin		72,839	LR	LR	UMP	UMP	UMP	RPR	RPR	DVG
Oise's 6th	Michel Guiniot		75,244	RN	LREM	FG	UMP	UMP	PCF	RPR	RPR
Oise's 7th	Maxime Minot		76,092	LR	LR	UMP	UMP	UMP	RPR	RPR	PS

=== Orne (61) – 3 constituencies ===
Constituency	Member	2024	Voters	2022	2017	2012	2007	2002	1997	1993	1988
Orne's 1st	Chantal Jourdan	PS	69,513	PS	PS	PS	UMP	UMP	RPR	RPR	RPR
Orne's 2nd	Véronique Louwagie	LR	67,447	LR	LR	UMP	UMP	UMP	UDF	UDF	UDF
Orne's 3rd	Jérôme Nury	LR	71,645	LR	LR	DVG	UMP	UMP	UDF	UDF	PS

=== Pas-de-Calais (62) – 12 constituencies ===
Constituency	Member	2024	Voters	2022	2017	2012	2007	2002	1997	1993	1988
Pas-de-Calais's 1st	Emmanuel Blairy	RN	105,247	RN	MoDem	PS	PS	MRG	MRG	MRG	MRG
Pas-de-Calais's 2nd	Agnès Pannier-Runacher	RE	88,606	LREM	LREM	PS	PS	PS	PS	UDF	PS
Pas-de-Calais's 3rd	Bruno Clavet	RN	83,041	PCF	FN	PS	PS	PS	UDF	UDF	UDF
Pas-de-Calais's 4th	Philippe Fait	RE	89,959	HOR	LR	UMP	UMP	UMP	RPR	RPR	RPR
Pas-de-Calais's 5th	Antoine Golliot	RN	90,922	LREM	LREM	PS	PS	PS	PS	UDF	PS
Pas-de-Calais's 6th	Christine Engrand	RN	94,643	RN	LREM	PS	PS	PS	PS	PS	PS
Pas-de-Calais's 7th	Marc de Fleurian	RN	94,682	LR	LR	PS	PS	PS	PS	RPR	PS
Pas-de-Calais's 8th	Auguste Evrard	RN	92,392	PS	LREM	PS	PS	PS	PS	RPR	PS
Pas-de-Calais's 9th	Caroline Parmentier	RN	80,773	RN	MoDem	PRG	UMP	MDC	PS	PS	PS
Pas-de-Calais's 10th	Thierry Frappé	RN	89,095	RN	FN	PS	PS	PS	PS	PS	PS
Pas-de-Calais's 11th	Marine Le Pen	RN	94,166	RN	FN	PS	PS	PS	PS	PS	PS
Pas-de-Calais's 12th	Bruno Bilde	RN	96,789	RN	NR	PS	PS	PS	PS	PS	PS

=== Puy-de-Dôme (63) – 5 constituencies ===
Constituency	Member	2024	Voters	2022	2017	2012	2007	2002	1997	1993	1988
Puy-de-Dôme's 1st	Marianne Maximi	LFI	83,501	LFI	LREM	PS	PS	PS	PS	UDF	PS
Puy-de-Dôme's 2nd	Christine Pirès-Beaune	PS	87,873	PS	PS	PS	PS	PS	PS	UDF	PS
Puy-de-Dôme's 3rd	Nicolas Bonnet	LE	89,010	MoDem	MoDem	EELV	UMP	UMP	UDF	UDF	UDF
Puy-de-Dôme's 4th	Delphine Lingemann	MoDem	98,645	MoDem	MoDem	PS	PS	PS	PS	RPR	PS
Puy-de-Dôme's 5th	André Chassaigne	PCF	102,047	PCF	PCF	PCF	PCF	PCF	PS	UDF	PS

=== Pyrénées-Atlantiques (64) – 6 constituencies ===
Constituency	Member	2024	Voters	2022	2017	2012	2007	2002	1997	1993	1988
Pyrénées-Atlantiques's 1st	Josy Poueyto		68,809	MoDem	MoDem	PS	PS	PS	PS	RPR	PS
Pyrénées-Atlantiques's 2nd	Jean-Paul Mattei		80,073	MoDem	MoDem	PS	MoDem	UDF	UDF	UDF	UDF
Pyrénées-Atlantiques's 3rd	David Habib		82,747	PS	PS	PS	PS	PS	PS	PS	PS
Pyrénées-Atlantiques's 4th	Iñaki Echaniz		80,185	PS	DVD	MoDem	MoDem	UDF	RPR	RPR	RPR
Pyrénées-Atlantiques's 5th	Florence Lasserre-David		90,977	MoDem	MoDem	PS	UMP	UMP	PS	UDF	UDF
Pyrénées-Atlantiques's 6th	Vincent Bru		99,395	MoDem	MoDem	PS	UMP	UMP	RPR	UDF	RPR

=== Hautes-Pyrénées (65) – 2 constituencies ===
Constituency	Member	2024	Voters	2022	2017	2012	2007	2002	1997	1993	1988
Hautes-Pyrénées's 1st	Sylvie Ferrer		88,311	LFI	LREM	PS	PS	PS	PS	UDF	PS
Hautes-Pyrénées's 2nd	Benoît Mournet		89,340	LREM	PRG	PRG	PRG	PRG	PRG	UDF	MRG

=== Pyrénées-Orientales (66) – 4 constituencies ===
Constituency	Member	2024	Voters	2022	2017	2012	2007	2002	1997	1993	1988
Pyrénées-Orientales's 1st	Sophie Blanc		70,972	RN	LREM	PS	UMP	UMP	PCF	RPR	RPR
Pyrénées-Orientales's 2nd	Anaïs Sabatini		96,636	RN	FN	UMP	UMP	UMP	PS	RPR	PS
Pyrénées-Orientales's 3rd	Sandrine Dogor-Such		83,040	RN	LREM	PS	UMP	UMP	PS	RPR	RPR
Pyrénées-Orientales's 4th	Michèle Martinez		97,099	RN	LREM	PS	UMP	PS	PS	PS	PS

=== Bas-Rhin (67) – 9 constituencies ===
Constituency	Member	2024	Voters	2022	2017	2012	2007	2002	1997	1993	1988
Bas-Rhin's 1st	Sandra Regol		61,033	EELV	LREM	PS	PS	PS	PS	UDF	UDF
Bas-Rhin's 2nd	Emmanuel Fernandes		69,535	LFI	LREM	PS	UMP	UMP	UDF	UDF	UDF
Bas-Rhin's 3rd	Bruno Studer		68,885	LREM	LREM	UMP	UMP	UMP	RPR	DVG	PS
Bas-Rhin's 4th	Françoise Buffet		94,490	LREM	LREM	UMP	UMP	UMP	UDF	RPR	RPR
Bas-Rhin's 5th	Charles Sitzenstuhl		103,986	LREM	LR	UMP	UMP	UDF	UDF	UDF	UDF
Bas-Rhin's 6th	Louise Morel		96,028	LREM	LR	UMP	DVD	DVD	DVD	DVD	UDF
Bas-Rhin's 7th	Patrick Hetzel		85,427	LR	LR	UMP	UMP	UMP	UDF	UDF	UDF
Bas-Rhin's 8th	Stéphanie Kochert		94,499	HOR	LR	UMP	UMP	UMP	UDF	UDF	RPR
Bas-Rhin's 9th	Vincent Thiébaut		92,729	HOR	LREM	DVD	UMP	UMP	RPR	RPR	RPR

=== Haut-Rhin (68) – 6 constituencies ===
Constituency	Member	2024	Voters	2022	2017	2012	2007	2002	1997	1993	1988
Haut-Rhin's 1st	Brigitte Klinkert		76,069	LREM	LR	UMP	UMP	UMP	RPR	RPR	UDF
Haut-Rhin's 2nd	Hubert Ott		92,204	MoDEM	LR	UMP	UMP	UMP	RPR	UDF	UDF
Haut-Rhin's 3rd	Didier Lemaire		85,719	HOR	LR	UMP	UMP	UMP	RPR	RPR	RPR
Haut-Rhin's 4th	Raphaël Schellenberger		102,685	LR	LR	UMP	UMP	UMP	RPR	RPR	RPR
Haut-Rhin's 5th	Olivier Becht		77,489	Agir	Agir	UMP	UMP	UMP	PS	UDF	PS
Haut-Rhin's 6th	Bruno Fuchs		92,418	MoDEM	MoDEM	NC	NC	UDF	UDF	UDF	UDF

=== Rhône (69) – 14 constituencies ===
Constituency	Member	2024	Voters	2022	2017	2012	2007	2002	1997	1993	1988
Rhône's 1st	Thomas Rudigoz		69,503	LREM	LREM	PRG	UMP	UDF	UDF	UDF	UDF
Rhône's 2nd	Hubert Julien-Laferrière		74,987	GE	LREM	PS	PS	UMP	RPR	DVD	RPR
Rhône's 3rd	Marie-Charlotte Garin		72,021	EELV	LREM	PS	PS	UMP	RPR	RPR	RPR
Rhône's 4th	Anne Brugnera		80,168	LREM	LREM	UMP	UMP	UMP	UDF	UDF	UDF
Rhône's 5th	Blandine Brocard		88,072	LREM	LREM	UMP	UMP	UMP	UDF	UDF	UDF
Rhône's 6th	Gabriel Amard		82,455	LFI	LREM	PS	PS	PS	PS	RPR	PS
Rhône's 7th	Alexandre Vincendet		68,017	LR	LREM	PS	PS	PS	PS	UDF	PS
Rhône's 8th	Nathalie Serre		102,568	LR	LR	UMP	UMP	UMP	RPR	UDF	UDF
Rhône's 9th	Alexandre Portier		91,683	LR	LR	UMP	UMP	UMP	UDF	UDF	UDF
Rhône's 10th	Thomas Gassilloud		95,268	Agir	LREM	UMP	UMP	UMP	RPR	RPR	RPR
Rhône's 11th	Jean-Luc Fugit		92,513	LREM	LREM	UMP	NC	UMP	PS	RPR	PS
Rhône's 12th	Cyrille Isaac-Sibille		79,783	MoDem	MoDem	UMP	UMP	UMP	RPR	RPR	RPR
Rhône's 13th	Sarah Tanzilli		84,804	LREM	LREM	UMP	UMP	PS	PS	PS	PS
Rhône's 14th	Idir Boumertit		74,256	LFI	LREM	PS	PS	PS	PS	PCF	PS

=== Haute-Saône (70) – 2 constituencies ===
Constituency	Member	2024	Voters	2022	2017	2012	2007	2002	1997	1993	1988
Haute-Saône's 1st	Antoine Villedieu	RN	88,348	RN	LREM	UMP	UMP	UMP	RPR	RPR	RPR
Haute-Saône's 2nd	Emeric Salmon	RN	89,378	RN	LREM	PS	PS	UMP	MDC	MDC	PS

=== Saône-et-Loire (71) – 5 constituencies ===
Constituency	Member	2024	Voters	2022	2017	2012	2007	2002	1997	1993	1988
Saône-et-Loire's 1st	Benjamin Dirx		72,448	LREM	LREM	PS	UMP	UMP	DL	UDF	PS
Saône-et-Loire’s 2nd	Josiane Corneloup		66,651	LR	LR	DVG	UMP	UMP	PRG	UDF	UDF
Saône-et-Loire’s 3rd	Rémy Rebeyrotte		83,724	LREM	LREM	PS	UMP	UMP	PS	RPR	PS
Saône-et-Loire’s 4th	Cécile Untermaier		81,128	PS	PS	PS	PS	PS	PS	PS	PS
Saône-et-Loire's 5th	Louis Margueritte		66,651	LREM	LREM	PS	PS	UMP	RPR	RPR	RPR

=== Sarthe (72) – 5 constituencies ===
Constituency	Member	2024	Voters	2022	2017	2012	2007	2002	1997	1993	1988
Sarthe's 1st	Julie Delpech		71,771	LREM	LREM	PS	UMP	UMP	UDF	UDF	RPR
Sarthe's 2nd	Marietta Karamanli		81,983	PS	PS	PS	PS	UMP	PS	RPR	PS
Sarthe's 3rd	Éric Martineau		85,250	MoDEM	LREM	DVG	UMP	UMP	PS	RPR	PS
Sarthe's 4th	Élise Leboucher		79,626	LFI	PS	PS	UMP	UMP	RPR	RPR	RPR
Sarthe's 5th	Jean-Carles Grelier		86,938	LREM	LR	UMP	UMP	UMP	PS	RPR	PS

=== Savoie (73) – 4 constituencies ===
Constituency	Member	2024	Voters	2022	2017	2012	2007	2002	1997	1993	1988
Savoie's 1st	Marina Ferrari		87,087	MoDEM	LREM	UMP	UMP	UMP	DVD	UDF	PS
Savoie's 2nd	Vincent Rolland		76,029	LR	LR	UMP	UMP	UMP	RPR	RPR	RPR
Savoie's 3rd	Émilie Bonnivard		72,714	LR	LR	PS	UMP	UMP	RPR	RPR	PS
Savoie's 4th	Jean-François Coulomme		74,639	LFI	MoDem	PS	Constituency created for 2012 election				

=== Haute-Savoie (74) – 6 constituencies ===
Constituency	Member	2024	Voters	2022	2017	2012	2007	2002	1997	1993	1988
Haute-Savoie's 1st	Véronique Riotton		100,409	LREM	LREM	UMP	UMP	UMP	RPR	RPR	UDF
Haute-Savoie's 2nd	Antoine Armand		94,953	LREM	LREM	UMP	DVD	UDF	UDF	UDF	UDF
Haute-Savoie's 3rd	Christelle Petex-Levet		81,855	LR	LR	UMP	UMP	UMP	UDF	UDF	UDF
Haute-Savoie's 4th	Virginie Duby-Muller		85,236	LR	LR	UMP	UMP	UMP	UDF	UDF	UDF
Haute-Savoie's 5th	Anne-Cécile Violland		95,600	HOR	LREM	UMP	UMP	UMP	RPR	RPR	RPR
Haute-Savoie's 6th	Xavier Roseren		78,941	LREM	LREM	UMP	Constituency created for 2012 election				

=== Paris (75) – 18 constituencies ===
Constituency	Member	2024	Voters	2022	2017	2012	2007	2002	1997	1993	1988
Paris's 1st	Sylvain Maillard		80,780	LREM	LREM	UMP	PG	EELV	UDF	UDF	UDF
Paris's 2nd	Gilles Le Gendre		71,736	LREM	LREM	UMP	UMP	UMP	RPR	RPR	RPR
Paris's 3rd	Stanislas Guerini		68,679	LREM	LREM	PS	UMP	UMP	RPR	RPR	RPR
Paris's 4th	Astrid Panosyan		69,753	LREM	LR	UMP	UMP	UMP	RPR	RPR	RPR
Paris's 5th	Pouria Amirshahi		75,881	EELV	LREM	PS	PS	PS	PS	RPR	RPR
Paris's 6th	Sophia Chikirou		76,657	LFI	LREM	EELV	PS	PS	MDC	MDC	PS
Paris's 7th	Clément Beaune		76,054	LREM	LREM	PS	PS	PS	PS	RPR	RPR
Paris's 8th	Éva Sas		82,164	EELV	LREM	PS	PS	UMP	RPR	RPR	RPR
Paris's 9th	Sandrine Rousseau		68,351	EELV	LREM	PS	PS	PS	PS	RPR	PS
Paris's 10th	Rodrigo Arenas		67,347	LFI	LREM	EELV	PS	PS	PS	RPR	RPR
Paris's 11th	Céline Hervieu		70,944	MoDem	MoDem	PS	EELV	EELV	RPR	RPR	RPR
Paris's 12th	Olivia Grégoire		73,915	LREM	LREM	UMP	UMP	UMP	RPR	RPR	RPR
Paris's 13th	David Amiel		75,382	LREM	LREM	UMP	UMP	UMP	RPR	RPR	RPR
Paris's 14th	Benjamin Haddad		72,364	LREM	LR	UMP	UMP	UMP	UDF	UDF	UDF
Paris's 15th	Danielle Simonnet		76,203	LFI	PS	PS	UMP	UMP	UDF	UDF	UDF
Paris's 16th	Sarah Legrain		70,384	LFI	LREM	PS	UMP	UMP	RPR	RPR	RPR
Paris's 17th	Danièle Obono		58,245	LFI	LFI	PS	PS	PS	RPR	RPR	RPR
Paris's 18th	Aymeric Caron		67,245	REV	LR	PS	PS	PS	PS	RPR	RPR

=== Seine-Maritime (76) – 10 constituencies ===
Constituency	Member	2024	Voters	2022	2017	2012	2007	2002	1997	1993	1988
Seine-Maritime's 1st	Damien Adam		64,488	LREM	LREM	PS	UMP	UMP	UDF	UDF	PS
Seine-Maritime's 2nd	Annie Vidal		94,797	LREM	LREM	UMP	UMP	UMP	UDF	UDF	PS
Seine-Maritime's 3rd	Hubert Wulfranc		69,397	PCF	PCF	PS	PS	PS	PS	PCF	PS
Seine-Maritime's 4th	Alma Dufour		88,359	LFI	LREM	PS	PS	PS	PS	PS	PS
Seine-Maritime's 5th	Gérard Leseul		96,317	PS	PS	PS	PS	PS	PS	PS	PS
Seine-Maritime's 6th	Sébastien Jumel		109,566	PCF	PCF	PS	PCF	UMP	PS	RPR	PS
Seine-Maritime's 7th	Agnès Firmin-Le Bodo		87,631	HOR	LR	UMP	UMP	UMP	RPR	RPR	RPR
Seine-Maritime's 8th	Jean-Paul Lecoq		67,666	PCF	PCF	PS	PCF	PCF	PCF	PCF	PCF
Seine-Maritime's 9th	Marie-Agnès Poussier-Winsback		93,669	HOR	LREM	PS	UMP	UMP	PS	UDF	PS
Seine-Maritime's 10th	Xavier Batut		108,745	LREM	LREM	PS	UMP	UMP	PS	RPR	PS

=== Seine-et-Marne (77) – 11 constituencies ===
Constituency	Member	2024	Voters	2022	2017	2012	2007	2002	1997	1993	1988
Seine-et-Marne's 1st	Aude Luquet		70,918	MoDem	MoDem	UMP	UMP	UMP	RPR	RPR	RPR
Seine-et-Marne's 2nd	Frédéric Valletoux		79,727	HOR	LR	UMP	UMP	UMP	RPR	RPR	RPR
Seine-et-Marne's 3rd	Jean-Louis Thiériot		75,457	LR	UDI	UDI	UMP	UMP	MDC	RPR	RPR
Seine-et-Marne's 4th	Isabelle Périgault		87,942	LR	LR	UMP	UMP	UMP	RPR	RPR	RPR
Seine-et-Marne's 5th	Franck Riester		84,878	Agir	Agir	UMP	UMP	UMP	RPR	RPR	RPR
Seine-et-Marne's 6th	Béatrice Roullaud		78,121	RN	LR	UMP	UMP	UMP	PS	RPR	PS
Seine-et-Marne's 7th	Ersilia Soudais		85,368	LFI	LREM	UMP	UMP	UMP	RPR	RPR	PS
Seine-et-Marne's 8th	Jean-Michel Fauvergue		88,870	LREM	LREM	PS	UMP	UMP	PS	UDF	PS
Seine-et-Marne's 9th	Michèle Peyron		85,973	LREM	LREM	UMP	UMP	UMP	PS	RPR	PS
Seine-et-Marne's 10th	Maxime Laisney		79,365	LFI	LREM	PS	Constituency created for 2012 election				
Seine-et-Marne's 11th	Olivier Faure		64,893	PS	PS	PS	Constituency created for 2012 election				

=== Yvelines (78) – 12 constituencies ===
Constituency	Member	2024	Voters	2022	2017	2012	2007	2002	1997	1993	1988
Yvelines's 1st	Charles Rodwell		83,490	LREM	LREM	UMP	UMP	UMP	RPR	RPR	RPR
Yvelines's 2nd	Jean-Noël Barrot		85,418	MoDem	MoDem	UMP	UMP	UMP	RPR	RPR	RPR
Yvelines's 3rd	Béatrice Piron		83,239	LREM	LREM	UMP	UMP	UMP	UDF	UDF	UDF
Yvelines's 4th	Marie Lebec		78,497	LREM	LREM	UMP	UMP	UMP	UDF	UDF	UDF
Yvelines's 5th	Yaël Braun-Pivet		73,783	LREM	LREM	UMP	UMP	UMP	RPR	RPR	RPR
Yvelines's 6th	Natalia Pouzyreff		75,704	LREM	LREM	UMP	UMP	UMP	RPR	RPR	RPR
Yvelines's 7th	Nadia Hai		80,615	LREM	MoDem	UMP	UMP	UMP	UDF	UDF	PS
Yvelines's 8th	Benjamin Lucas		73,870	G.s	LR	PS	UMP	UMP	PS	RPR	PS
Yvelines's 9th	Bruno Millienne		90,984	MoDem	MoDem	UMP	UMP	UMP	RPR	RPR	RPR
Yvelines's 10th	Aurore Bergé		88,764	LREM	LREM	DVD	UMP	UMP	UDF	UDF	UDF
Yvelines's 11th	William Martinet		68,015	LFI	LREM	PS	UMP	UMP	PS	RPR	PS
Yvelines's 12th	Karl Olive		69,005	LREM	LREM	UMP	UMP	UMP	RPR	RPR	RPR

=== Deux-Sèvres (79) – 3 constituencies ===
Constituency	Member	2024	Voters	2022	2017	2012	2007	2002	1997	1993	1988
Deux-Sèvres's 1st	Bastien Marchive		90,237	HOR	LREM	PS	PS	PS	PS	UDF	PS
Deux-Sèvres's 2nd	Delphine Batho		97,376	GE	PS	PS	PS	PS	PS	PS	PS
Deux-Sèvres's 3rd	Jean-Marie Fiévet		84,788	LREM	LREM	UMP	UMP	UMP	UDF	UDF	RPR

=== Somme (80) – 5 constituencies ===
Constituency	Member	2024	Voters	2022	2017	2012	2007	2002	1997	1993	1988
Somme's 1st	François Ruffin		84,286	LFI	LFI	PS	PCF	PCF	PCF	PCF	PS
Somme's 2nd	Barbara Pompili		75,487	LREM	LREM	EELV	NC	UDF	UDF	UDF	UDF
Somme's 3rd	Emmanuel Maquet		83,768	LR	LR	PS	UMP	UMP	PS	RPR	PS
Somme's 4th	Jean-Philippe Tanguy		84,023	RN	LREM	UMP	PS	UMP	PS	RPR	PS
Somme's 5th	Yaël Ménache		81,450	RN	UDI	NC	NC	UDF	RPR	RPR	RPR

=== Tarn (81) – 3 constituencies ===
Constituency	Member	2024	Voters	2022	2017	2012	2007	2002	1997	1993	1988
Tarn's 1st	Frédéric Cabrolier		83,771	RN	AC	AC	PS	PS	PS	PS	PS
Tarn's 2nd	Karen Erodi		106,014	LFI	LREM	PS	PS	PS	PS	RPR	PS
Tarn's 3rd	Jean Terlier		101,429	LREM	LREM	PS	DVD	UDF	RPR	RPR	RPR

=== Tarn-et-Garonne (82) – 2 constituencies ===
Constituency	Member	2024	Voters	2022	2017	2012	2007	2002	1997	1993	1988
Tarn-et-Garonne's 1st	Valérie Rabault		89,975	PS	PS	PS	UMP	UMP	PS	UDF	PS
Tarn-et-Garonne's 2nd	Marine Hamelet		93,323	RN	PRG	PRG	UMP	UMP	PS	UDF	MRG

=== Var (83) – 8 constituencies ===
Constituency	Member	2024	Voters	2022	2017	2012	2007	2002	1997	1993	1988
Var's 1st	Yannick Chenevard		74,842	LREM	LR	UMP	UMP	UMP	NR	UDF	UDF
Var's 2nd	Laure Lavalette		90,541	RN	LREM	UMP	UMP	UMP	PS	UDF	UDF
Var's 3rd	Stéphane Rambaud		100,775	RN	LR	UMP	UMP	UMP	RPR	UDF	NR
Var's 4th	Philippe Lottiaux		106,143	RN	LREM	UMP	UMP	UMP	RPR	RPR	RPR
Var's 5th	Julie Lechanteux		96,236	RN	MoDem	UMP	UMP	UMP	UDF	UDF	UDF
Var's 6th	Frank Giletti		118,392	RN	LREM	UMP	UMP	UMP	PS	UDF	UDF
Var's 7th	Frédéric Boccaletti		103,503	RN	LREM	UMP	UMP	UMP	RPR	UDF	UDF
Var's 8th	Philippe Schrek		104,360	RN	LREM	UMP	Constituency created for 2012 election				

=== Vaucluse (84) – 5 constituencies ===
Constituency	Member	2024	Voters	2022	2017	2012	2007	2002	1997	1993	1988
Vaucluse's 1st	Joris Hébrard		72,991	RN	LREM	PS	UMP	UMP	PS	RPR	PS
Vaucluse's 2nd	Bénédicte Auzanot		83,311	RN	LR	UMP	UMP	UMP	PS	UDF	PS
Vaucluse's 3rd	Hervé de Lépinau		75,602	RN	LREM	NR	UMP	UMP	RPR	RPR	RPR
Vaucluse's 4th	Marie-France Lorho		88,777	RN	DVD	DVD	UMP	UMP	RPR	RPR	PS
Vaucluse's 5th	Jean-François Lovisolo		81,870	LREM	LR	UMP	Constituency created for 2012 election				

=== Vendée (85) – 5 constituencies ===
Constituency	Member	2024	Voters	2022	2017	2012	2007	2002	1997	1993	1988
Vendée's 1st	Philippe Latombe		109,665	MoDem	MoDem	UMP	NC	UDF	UDF	UDF	UDF
Vendée's 2nd	Béatrice Bellamy		103,480	HOR	MoDem	PS	UMP	UMP	DVD	UDF	UDF
Vendée's 3rd	Stéphane Buchou		122,015	LREM	LREM	UMP	UMP	UMP	RPR	RPR	RPR
Vendée's 4th	Véronique Besse		97,892	SE	LREM	DVD	DVD	DVD	DVD	UDF	UDF
Vendée's 5th	Pierre Henriet		81,455	LREM	LREM	PS	DVD	DVD	UDF	UDF	PS

=== Vienne (86) – 4 constituencies ===
Constituency	Member	2024	Voters	2022	2017	2012	2007	2002	1997	1993	1988
Vienne's 1st	Lisa Belluco		79,559	EELV	LREM	PS	PS	PS	PS	RPR	PS
Vienne's 2nd	Sacha Houlié		77,522	LREM	LREM	PS	UMP	UMP	PS	RPR	RPR
Vienne's 3rd	Pascal Lecamp		74,026	MoDem	LREM	PS	PS	UMP	RPR	RPR	RPR
Vienne's 4th	Nicolas Turquois		75,658	MoDem	MoDem	EELV	NC	UDF	UDF	UDF	PS

=== Haute-Vienne (87) – 3 constituencies ===
Constituency	Member	2024	Voters	2022	2017	2012	2007	2002	1997	1993	1988
Haute-Vienne's 1st	Damien Maudet		84,743	LFI	LREM	PS	PS	UMP	PS	RPR	PS
Haute-Vienne's 2nd	Stéphane Delautrette		97,462	PS	LREM	PS	PS	PS	PS	RPR	PS
Haute-Vienne's 3rd	Manon Meunier		83,058	LFI	LREM	PS	PS	PS	PS	RPR	PS

=== Vosges (88) – 4 constituencies ===
Constituency	Member	2024	Voters	2022	2017	2012	2007	2002	1997	1993	1988
Vosges's 1st	Stéphane Viry		77,078	LR	LR	UMP	UMP	UMP	RPR	RPR	RPR
Vosges's 2nd	David Valence		73,261	LREM	LR	UMP	UMP	UMP	PS	RPR	PS
Vosges's 3rd	Christophe Naegelen		65,649	UDI	UDI	UMP	UMP	UMP	RPR	RPR	DVD
Vosges's 4th	Jean-Jacques Gaultier		66,558	LR	LR	PS	UMP	UMP	DVG	UDF	PS

=== Yonne (89) – 3 constituencies ===
Constituency	Member	2024	Voters	2022	2017	2012	2007	2002	1997	1993	1988
Yonne's 1st	Daniel Grenon		76,916	RN	LR	UMP	UMP	UMP	UDF	UDF	UDF
Yonne's 2nd	André Villiers		75,693	HOR	UDI	PS	UMP	UMP	PS	PS	PS
Yonne's 3rd	Julien Odoul		89,140	RN	LREM	UMP	UMP	UMP	RPR	RPR	RPR

=== Territoire de Belfort (90) – 2 constituencies ===
Constituency	Member	2024	Voters	2022	2017	2012	2007	2002	1997	1993	1988
Territoire de Belfort's 1st	Ian Boucard		47,838	LR	LR	UMP	UMP	UMP	PS	RPR	PS
Territoire de Belfort's 2nd	Florian Chauche		47,495	LFI	UDI	DVD	DVD	DVD	MDC	MDC	PS

=== Essonne (91) – 10 constituencies ===
Constituency	Member	2024	Voters	2022	2017	2012	2007	2002	1997	1993	1988
Essonne's 1st	Farida Amrani		71,200	LFI	LREM	PS	PS	PS	PS	PS	PS
Essonne's 2nd	Nathalie da Conceicao Carvalho		90,740	RN	LR	UMP	UMP	UMP	RPR	RPR	RPR
Essonne's 3rd	Alexis Izard		95,817	LREM	LREM	PS	UMP	UMP	PS	RPR	PS
Essonne's 4th	Marie-Pierre Rixain		96,489	LREM	LREM	UMP	UMP	UMP	UDF	UDF	UDF
Essonne's 5th	Paul Midy		68,395	LREM	LREM	PS	UMP	UMP	RPR	UDF	UDF
Essonne's 6th	Jérôme Guedj		81,934	PS	LREM	PS	PS	PS	PS	RPR	PS
Essonne's 7th	Robin Reda		73,663	LREM	LR	EELV	UMP	UMP	RPR	RPR	PS
Essonne's 8th	Nicolas Dupont-Aignan		76,458	DLF	DLF	DLF	DLF	UMP	RPR	RPR	PS
Essonne's 9th	Marie Guévenoux		79,287	LREM	LREM	PS	UMP	UMP	RPR	RPR	PS
Essonne's 10th	Antoine Léaument		60,911	LFI	LREM	PS	PS	PS	PS	PS	PS

=== Hauts-de-Seine (92) – 13 constituencies ===
Constituency	Member	2024	Voters	2022	2017	2012	2007	2002	1997	1993	1988
Hauts-de-Seine's 1st	Elsa Faucillon		62,486	PCF	PCF	PCF	PS	PCF	PCF	PCF	PCF
Hauts-de-Seine's 2nd	Francesca Pasquini		68,008	EELV	LREM	PS	UMP	UMP	RPR	RPR	RPR
Hauts-de-Seine's 3rd	Philippe Juvin		81,072	LR	LREM	UMP	UMP	UMP	RPR	UDF	UDF
Hauts-de-Seine's 4th	Sabrina Sebaihi		76,175	EELV	LREM	FG	PCF	PCF	PCF	RPR	PS
Hauts-de-Seine's 5th	Céline Calvez		70,370	LREM	LREM	UMP	UMP	UMP	RPR	RPR	RPR
Hauts-de-Seine's 6th	Constance Le Grip		74,305	LREM	LR	DVD	UMP	UMP	RPR	RPR	RPR
Hauts-de-Seine's 7th	Pierre Cazeneuve		86,690	LREM	LREM	UMP	UMP	UMP	RPR	RPR	RPR
Hauts-de-Seine's 8th	Prisca Thévenot		68,751	LREM	LREM	UMP	UMP	UMP	RPR	RPR	RPR
Hauts-de-Seine's 9th	Emmanuel Pellerin		64,985	LREM	LR	DVD	UMP	UMP	UDF	RPR	RPR
Hauts-de-Seine's 10th	Gabriel Attal		78,974	LREM	LREM	UDI	NC	UDF	UDF	UDF	UDF
Hauts-de-Seine's 11th	Aurélien Saintoul		69,273	LFI	LREM	PS	PCF	PCF	PCF	PCF	PS
Hauts-de-Seine's 12th	Jean-Louis Bourlanges		92,856	MoDem	MoDem	PS	UMP	UMP	UDF	UDF	UDF
Hauts-de-Seine's 13th	Maud Bregeon		89,108	LREM	LREM	UMP	UMP	UMP	RPR	RPR	RPR

=== Seine-Saint-Denis (93) – 12 constituencies ===
Constituency	Member	2024	Voters	2022	2017	2012	2007	2002	1997	1993	1988
Seine-Saint-Denis's 1st	Éric Coquerel		61,804	LFI	LFI	PS	PS	PS	PS	UDF	PS
Seine-Saint-Denis's 2nd	Stéphane Peu		54,143	PCF	PCF	PCF	PCF	PCF	PCF	PCF	PCF
Seine-Saint-Denis's 3rd	Thomas Portes		72,572	LFI	LREM	PS	PS	PS	PS	RPR	PS
Seine-Saint-Denis's 4th	Soumya Bourouaha		60,977	PCF	PCF	PCF	PCF	PCF	PCF	PCF	PCF
Seine-Saint-Denis's 5th	Raquel Garrido		63,848	LFI	UDI	NC	NC	UDF	PCF	PCF	PCF
Seine-Saint-Denis's 6th	Bastien Lachaud		52,593	LFI	LFI	PS	PS	PS	PS	PS	PS
Seine-Saint-Denis's 7th	Alexis Corbière		76,062	LFI	LFI	PS	DVG	DVG	DVG	PCF	PCF
Seine-Saint-Denis's 8th	Fatiha Keloua-Hachi		60,133	PS	LREM	PS	UMP	UMP	RPR	RPR	RPR
Seine-Saint-Denis's 9th	Aurélie Trouvé		70,180	LFI	LFI	PS	PS	PS	PS	PS	PS
Seine-Saint-Denis's 10th	Nadège Abomangoli		68,698	LFI	LR	PS	UMP	UMP	RPR	RPR	PS
Seine-Saint-Denis's 11th	Clémentine Autain		62,665	LFI	LFI	FG	PCF	PCF	PCF	PCF	PCF
Seine-Saint-Denis's 12th	Jérôme Legavre		64,794	POI	LREM	PS	UMP	UMP	DVG	RPR	RPR

=== Val-de-Marne (94) – 11 constituencies ===
Constituency	Member	2024	Voters	2022	2017	2012	2007	2002	1997	1993	1988
Val-de-Marne's 1st	Frédéric Descrozaille		84,680	LREM	LREM	UMP	UMP	UMP	UDF	UDF	RPR
Val-de-Marne's 2nd	Clémence Guetté		63,379	LFI	LREM	PS	PS	PS	PS	PS	PS
Val-de-Marne's 3rd	Louis Boyard		72,165	LFI	LREM	PRG	UMP	PRG	PRG	PRG	PRG
Val-de-Marne's 4th	Maud Petit		72,739	MoDem	MoDem	UMP	UMP	UMP	UDF	UDF	UDF
Val-de-Marne's 5th	Mathieu Lefevre		89,457	LREM	LR	UMP	UMP	UMP	RPR	RPR	RPR
Val-de-Marne's 6th	Guillaume Gouffier-Cha		81,289	LREM	LREM	EELV	UMP	UMP	RPR	RPR	RPR
Val-de-Marne's 7th	Rachel Kéké		65,556	LFI	LREM	PS	UMP	UMP	RPR	RPR	RPR
Val-de-Marne's 8th	Michel Herbillon		76,749	LR	LR	UMP	UMP	UMP	DVD	RPR	RPR
Val-de-Marne's 9th	Isabelle Santiago		53,666	PS	PS	PS	PS	PS	PS	PCF	PS
Val-de-Marne's 10th	Mathilde Panot		64,439	LFI	LFI	MRC	PCF	PCF	PCF	PCF	PCF
Val-de-Marne's 11th	Sophie Taillé-Polian		62,446	G.s	LREM	PS	PS	PS	PCF	PCF	PCF

=== Val-d’Oise (95) – 10 constituencies ===
Constituency	Member	2024	Voters	2022	2017	2012	2007	2002	1997	1993	1988
Val-d'Oise's 1st	Émilie Chandler		81,549	LREM	LREM	UMP	UMP	UMP	UDF	UDF	UDF
Val-d'Oise's 2nd	Guillaume Vuilletet		76,522	LREM	LREM	UMP	UMP	UMP	PS	UDF	PS
Val-d'Oise's 3rd	Cécile Rilhac		91,577	LREM	LREM	DVG	UMP	UMP	RPR	RPR	PS
Val-d'Oise's 4th	Naïma Moutchou		76,061	HOR	LREM	PS	UMP	UMP	UDF	UDF	UDF
Val-d'Oise's 5th	Paul Vannier		68,484	LFI	LREM	PS	UMP	UMP	PCF	RPR	PCF
Val-d'Oise's 6th	Estelle Folest		76,438	MoDem	MoDem	UMP	UMP	UMP	RPR	RPR	RPR
Val-d'Oise's 7th	Dominique Da Silva		69,585	LREM	LREM	UMP	UMP	UMP	EELV	RPR	PS
Val-d'Oise's 8th	Carlos Martens Bilongo		54,554	LFI	PS	PS	PS	PS	PS	RPR	PS
Val-d'Oise's 9th	Arnaud Le Gall		69,985	LFI	LREM	PS	UMP	PS	PS	RPR	PS
Val-d'Oise's 10th	Aurélien Taché		66,540	LND	LREM	PS	Constituency created for 2012 election				

== Overseas: 27 constituencies ==
=== Guadeloupe (971) – 4 seats ===
Constituency	1958	1962	1967	1968	1973	1978	1981	1988	1993	1997	2002	2007	2012	2017	2022	2024
Guadeloupe's 1st constituency	UNR	UNR-UDT	UD-V^{e}	UDR	UDR	RPR	DVG	PS	PS	GUSR	DVG	DVG	DVG	LREM	GUSR	TBD
Guadeloupe's 2nd constituency	SFIO	SFIO	DVG	DVG	PS	RPR	PS	PPDG	PPDG	PPDG	UMP-DVD	UMP	DVG	DVG	PPDG	TBD
Guadeloupe's 3rd constituency	CNIP	RI	UD-V^{e}	UDR	UDR	RPR	DVD	PS	DVD	DVG	UMP-DVD	DVG	DVG	DVG	DVG	TBD
Guadeloupe's 4th constituency								RPR	RPR	RPR	PS	PS	PS	PS	PS	TBD

=== Martinique (972) – 4 seats ===
Constituency	1958	1962	1967	1968	1973	1978	1981	1988	1993	1997	2002	2007	2012	2017	2022	2024
Martinique's 1st constituency	SFIO	SFIO	UD-V^{e}	UDR	UDR	RPR	RPR	DVG	DVD	RPR	PS	PS	MIM	BPM	DVG	DVG
Martinique's 2nd constituency	PPM	PPM	PPM	PPM	PPM	PS	PS	DVG	RPR	RPR	UMP	UMP	RDM	DVG	Péyi-A	Péyi-A
Martinique's 3rd constituency	DVD	DVD	DVD	DVD	DVD	DVD	DVD	PS	PPM	PPM	BPM	PPM	PPM	PPM	PPM	FSM
Martinique's 4th constituency								PS	RPR	MIM	MIM	MIM	MIM	MIM	Péyi-A	Péyi-A

=== Guiana (973) – 2 seats ===
Constituency	1958	1962	1967	1968	1973	1978	1981	1988	1993	1997	2002	2007	2012	2017	2022	2024
French Guiana's 1st constituency	PSG	PSG	UD-V^{e}	UDR	UDR	RPR	PSG	PSG	Walwari-RL	Walwari-RCV	PRG-Walwari	PRG-Walwari	PSG	PSG	MDES	MDES
French Guiana's 2nd constituency								RPR	RPR	RPR	UMP	PSG	PSG	LREM	DVG	DVG

=== Réunion (974) – 7 seats ===
Constituency	1958	1962	1967	1968	1973	1978	1981	1988	1993	1997	2002	2007	2012	2017	2022	2024
Réunion's 1st constituency	CNIP	UNR-UDT	UD-V^{e}	UDR	UDR	RPR	RPR	DVD	PS	PS	UMP	UMP	PS	PS	PS	PS
Réunion's 2nd constituency	UNR	CDS	UD-V^{e}	UDR	UDR	DVD	DVD	DVG	PCR	PCR	PCR	PCR	PLR	PLR	PLR	PLR
Réunion's 3rd constituency	DVD	MRP	UD-V^{e}	DVD	DVD	UDF	PS	DVD	DVD	DVD	DVD	UMP	PS	LR	LR diss	RN
Réunion's 4th constituency								PCR	RPR	PCR	PS	PS	PS	LR	LP	LP
Réunion's 5th constituency								CDS	UDF	PCR	UMP	PS	PS	DVG	RÉ974	RÉ974
Réunion's 6th constituency													PS	LR	PLR	PLR
Réunion's 7th constituency													MoDem	MoDem	LFI	RÉ974

=== Saint Pierre and Miquelon (975) – 1 seat ===
Constituency	1958	1962	1967	1968	1973	1978	1981	1988	1993	1997	2002	2007	2012	2017	2022	2024
Saint-Pierre-et-Miquelon's 1st constituency	PSA	Ind	UD-V^{e}	UDR	UC	Ind	DVG	UDF	UDF	UDF	AD-UMP	PRG	PRG	PRG	DVD	DVD

=== Mayotte (976) – 2 seats ===
Constituency	1973	1978	1981	1988	1993	1997	2002	2007	2012	2017	2022	2024
Mayotte's 1st constituency	Ind	UDF	DVG	CDS	UDF	UDF	UMP	MDM	DVG	PS	DIV	DVD
Mayotte's 2nd constituency									PS	LR	LR	RN

=== Saint Barthélemy and Saint Martin (977) – 1 seat ===
Constituency	2012	2017	2022	2024
Saint Barthélemy and Saint-Martin's 1st constituency	UMP	LR	LREM	DVC

=== Wallis and Futuna (986) – 1 seat ===
Constituency	1958	1962	1967	1968	1973	1978	1981	1988	1993	1997	2002	2007	2012	2017	2022	2024
Wallis and Futuna's 1st constituency	CNIP	RI	UDR	UDR	UDR	RPR	RPR	RPR	PRG	RPR	UMP	PS	DVD	DVG	LREM	RE

=== French Polynesia (987) – 3 seats ===
Constituency	1958	1962	1967	1968	1973	1978	1981	1988	1993	1997	2002	2007	2012	2017	2022	2024
French Polynesia's 1st constituency	RDPT	RDPT	RI	DVG	DVG	Here Ai'a	Here Ai'a	RPR	RPR	RPR	UMP	DVD	Tahoera'a	Tapura	Tāvini	Tapura
French Polynesia's 2nd constituency						RPR	RPR	Aia Api	RPR	DVD	UMP	UMP	Tahoera'a	Tapura	Tāvini	A here
French Polynesia's 3rd constituency													Tahoera'a	Tavini	Tāvini	Tāvini

=== New Caledonia (988) – 2 seats ===
Constituency	1958	1962	1967	1968	1973	1978	1981	1988	1993	1997	2002	2007	2012	2017	2022	2024
New Caledonia's 1st constituency	UC	UC	UC	UC	UC	UC	UC	RPCR-RPR	RPCR-RPR	RPCR-RPR	RPCR-UMP	R-UMP	CE-LMD-UDC	CE	CE	GNC
New Caledonia's 2nd constituency						RPCR-RPR	RPCR-RPR	RPCR-RPR	RPCR-RPR	RPCR-RPR	RPCR-UMP	R-UMP	CE-LMD-UDC	CE	LREM	UC

== French Citizens Overseas: 11 constituencies ==
Constituency	Region	2012	2017	2022	2024
1st	Canada and the United States	PS-EELV	LREM	LREM	RE
2nd	Mexico, Central America, South America, and the Caribbean	EELV-PS	LREM	LREM	RE
3rd	British Isles, Scandinavia, Baltics	PS	LREM	LREM	RE
4th	Benelux	PS	LREM	LREM	RE
5th	Iberia	PS	LREM	LREM	RE
6th	Switzerland	UMP	REM	LREM	RE
7th	Central, Eastern, and Southeastern Europe	PS-EELV	MoDem	MoDem	MoDem
8th	Mediterranean Europe (Italy, Greece, Israel, Malta, Turkey)	PS	UDI	UDI	RE
9th	North and Northwest Africa	PS	Ind	G.s	G.s
10th	Eastern and Southern Africa, Arabia	UMP	LREM	LREM	RE
11th	Former USSR, Asia, Oceania	UMP	LREM	LREM	RE

== See also ==
- Lists of electoral districts by nation
