= List of presidents of the Regional Council of Martinique =

This is a list of presidents of the Regional Council of Martinique:

Name	Entered office	Left office	Party	Notes
Camille Petit	1974	1983	UNR, from 1982: RPR	He died on 2 August 1993
Aimé Césaire	February 1983	June 1988	PPM	He died on 17 April 2008
Camille Darsières	June 1988	29 March 1992	PPM	He died on 14 December 2006
Emile Capgras	29 March 1992	20 March 1998	PCM	He died on 14 August 2014.
Alfred Marie-Jeanne	20 March 1998	22 March 2010	MIM	
Serge Letchimy	26 March 2010	18 December 2015	PPM	

At the end of 2015, the Regional Council and the General Councils (last President of the General Council of Martinique, Josette Manin) of Martinique were abolished and replaced by the Assembly of Martinique. The first president of this assembly was Alfred Marie-Jeanne, of the MIM, elected 18 December 2015.

== Sources ==
- World Statesmen.org
