= Martinique's 4th constituency =

Constituency of the French Fifth Republic

4th constituency of Martinique
- inline Constituency of the National Assembly of France

- Map of Martinique constituencies
- Deputy: Jean-Philippe Nilor; Péyi-A
- Department: Martinique
- Cantons: Les Anses-d'Arlets, Le Diamant, Ducos, Le François I, Le François II, Le Marin, Rivière-Pilote, Rivière-Salée, Le Robert I, Le Robert II, Saint-Esprit, Sainte-Anne, Sainte-Luce, Les Trois-Ilets, Le Vauclin

The 4th constituency of Martinique is a French legislative constituency in the Martinique département, currently represented by Jean-Philippe Nilor of Péyi-A.

== Deputies ==
Election	Member	Party
2007	Alfred Marie-Jeanne	MIM
2012	Jean-Philippe Nilor	MIM
2017	Jean-Philippe Nilor	MIM
2022	Jean-Philippe Nilor	Péyi-A
2024	Jean-Philippe Nilor	Péyi-A

== Election results ==
=== 2024 ===
Candidate	Party	Alliance	First round		Second round	
Candidate	Party	Alliance	Votes	%	Votes	%
Jean-Philippe Nilor	Péyi-A	NFP	15,405	63.18	21,620	86.58
Grégory Michel Roy-Larentry	RN		2,408	9.88	3,350	13.42
Philippe Petit	UDI		2,316	9.50		
Louis Boutrin	ECO		1,538	6.31		
Aude Gossard	REG		1,294	5.31		
Yvette Galot	DVG		824	3.38		
Karine Therese	LÉ diss.		599	2.46		
Valid votes			24,384	100.00	24,970	100.00
Blank votes			601	2.36	1,003	3.76
Null votes			471	1.85	687	2.58
Turnout			25,456	30.15	26,660	31.58
Abstentions			58,966	69.85	57,763	68.42
Registered voters			84,422		84,423	
Result			Péyi-A HOLD			

=== 2022 ===
Legislative Election 2022: Martinique's 4th constituency
Party	Candidate	Votes	%	±%
Péyi-A	Jean-Philippe Nilor	8,367	43.99	N/A
MIM	Alfred Marie-Jeanne	4,881	25.66	−21.21
PPM	David Dinal	1,438	7.56	−7.46
DVG	Ruddy Duville	1,430	7.52	N/A
EELV	Karine Therese	755	3.97	N/A
UDI	Philippe Petit	590	3.10	−1.33
RN	Nicolas Occolier	415	2.18	+0.45
Others	N/A	1,145	6.03	−
Turnout		19,021	23.51	−0.24
2nd round result
Péyi-A	Jean-Philippe Nilor	15,329	71.37	N/A
MIM	Alfred Marie-Jeanne	6,149	28.63	−39.39
Turnout		21,478	27.36	−0.98
Péyi-A gain from MIM				

=== 2017 ===
Candidate	Label	First round		Second round	
Candidate	Label	Votes	%	Votes	%
Jean-Philippe Nilor	MIM	8,780	46.87	14,794	68.02
Sylvia Saithsoothane	LR	3,386	18.08	6,954	31.98
David Dinal	DVG	2,813	15.02		
Ernest Kilo	FI	896	4.78		
Philippe Petit	UDI	830	4.43		
Jérémie Ferdinand	REG	359	1.92		
Daniel Duval-Violton	DIV	346	1.85		
Élodie Babin	FN	324	1.73		
Gabriel Jean-Marie	EXG	277	1.48		
Steeve Louis-Marie	DIV	213	1.14		
Hervé Pinto	DIV	185	0.99		
Émilie Joncart	DVG	182	0.97		
Sébastien Dubois	DIV	140	0.75		
Votes		18,731	100.00	21,748	100.00
Valid votes		18,731	94.17	21,748	91.65
Blank votes		662	3.33	989	4.17
Null votes		497	2.50	992	4.18
Turnout		19,890	23.75	23,729	28.34
Abstentions		63,844	76.25	60,005	71.66
Registered voters		83,734		83,734	
Source: Ministry of the Interior

=== 2012 ===
2012 legislative election in Martinique's 4th constituency
Candidate	Party	First round		Second round	
Candidate	Party	Votes	%	Votes	%
Jean-Philippe Nilor	MIM	10,358	39.80%	20,304	69.75%
Arnaud Rene Corail	PPM	3,301	12.68%	8,904	30.59%
Raymond Occolier	PS	3,124	12.00%		
André Lesueur		3,078	11.83%		
Eugène Larcher	RDM	1,696	6.52%		
Fred-Michel Tirault	UMP	1,559	5.99%		
Charles-André Mence	PS	1,254	4.82%		
Philippe Petit		462	1.78%		
Jean-Claude Filin		360	1.38%		
Jean-François Beaunol	MoDem	357	1.37%		
Catherine Besson	FN	254	0.98%		
Gabriel Jean	Combat ouvrier	184	0.71%		
Max Lambert	DVD	36	0.14%		
Valid votes		26,023	95.39%	29,108	93.79%
Spoilt and null votes		1,258	4.61%	1,928	6.21%
Votes cast / turnout		27,281	34.53%	31,036	39.29%
Abstentions		51,724	65.47%	47,962	60.71%
Registered voters		79,005	100.00%	78,998	100.00%

=== 2007 ===
Legislative Election 2007: Martinique 4th - 2nd round
Party	Candidate	Votes	%	±%
MIM	Alfred Marie-Jeanne	26,673	68.46	
UMP	Monique Rabin	12,289	31.54	
Turnout		41,661	40.25	
MIM hold		Swing		

== Sources and references ==
- Official results of French elections from 1998: "Résultats électoraux officiels en France" (in French). Archived from the original on 2011-12-20.
