= Emile Capgras =

Martinican politician

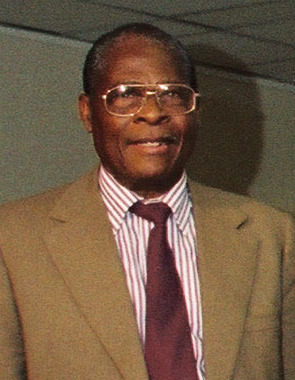

President of the Regional Council of Martinique
- In office March 29, 1992 – March 20, 1998
- Preceded by: Camille Darsières
- Succeeded by: Alfred Marie-Jeanne

Personal details
- Born: June 5, 1926 Le Robert, Martinique
- Died: August 14, 2014 (aged 88) Fort-de-France, Martinique
- Party: Martinican Communist Party

Emile Capgras (June 5, 1926 – August 14, 2014) was a Martinican politician and member of the Martinican Communist Party (PCM). He served as the President of the Regional Council of Martinique from March 29, 1992, until March 20, 1998.

Capgras was born in Le Robert, Martinique, on June 5, 1926. He began his career as an apprentice boilmaker in 1940. Capgras joined the Martinican Communist Party in 1948 and become a member of the PCM Central Committee in 1968.

He was elected as a Le Robert city councilor in 1983. He was later appointed Deputy Mayor of Le Robert from 1995 to 1997 under then Mayor Edouard de Lépine.

Capgras largely retired from public life after leaving the Presidency of the Regional Council in 1998. Emile Capgras died in Fort-de-France during the night of August 13 and August 14, 2014, at the age of 88.

Political offices
Preceded by Camille Darsières	President of the Regional Council of Martinique; 1992–1998	Succeeded by Alfred Marie-Jeanne
