= Péyi-A =

Political party in Martinique

- President: Jean-Philippe Nilor; Marcellin Nadeau
- Founded: February 3, 2019
- Split from: Martinican Independence Movement
- Headquarters: 34 rue de la Guinée, Fort-de-France, Martinique
- Ideology: Martinique independence
- Political position: Left-wing
- National affiliation: NUPES (2022-2024); New Popular Front (2024-present)
- Deputies: 3 / 577
- Senators: 0 / 348
- Assembly of Martinique: 5 / 51

Péyi-A is a political party in Martinique that supports Martinican independence from France.

== History ==
Péyi-A supported Jean-Luc Mélenchon in the 2022 French presidential election. Péyi-A contested the 2022 French legislative election as part of NUPES, and elected two members to the National Assembly; Marcellin Nadeau and Jean-Philippe Nilor. In the 2024 French legislative election, Péya-A competed as part of the New Popular Front with Nadeau and Nilor being returned, while returning deputy Jiovanny William joined them as well.

=== Electoral history ===
National Assembly
Election year	Leader	1st round votes	%	2nd round votes	%	Seats	+/–
2022	Jean-Philippe Nilor; Marcellin Nadeau	13,487	21,72	28,093	38,53	2 / 4	▲2
2024	Jean-Philippe Nilor; Marcellin Nadeau	41,527	46,05	57,402	61,98	3 / 4	▲1

Assembly of Martinique
Election year	Leader	1st round votes	%	2nd round votes	%	Seats	+/–
2021	Jean-Philippe Nilor; Marcellin Nadeau	11,481	12,01	16,664	12,54	5 / 51	▲4th

== See also ==
- Martinican Independence Movement
- Build the Martinique Country
