= Martinican Communist Party =

Martinican Communist Party Parti communiste martiniquais
- Leader: Georges Erichot
- Founded: September 1957
- Headquarters: Fort-de-France
- Newspaper: Justice
- Ideology: Communism; Martiniquean autonomism
- National affiliation: French Communist Party; New Popular Front (2024–present)

The Martinican Communist Party (French: Parti communiste martiniquais) is a political party in the French département d'outre-mer of Martinique. Georges Erichot is the general secretary of the party.

The party was founded in September 1957 at the first conference of the Martinique federation of the French Communist Party. Amongst its founders was the communist MP Léopold Bissol. In the early 1960s PCM became the largest party in Martinique. In 1971 the party governed 4 municipalities. The strength of PCM was based on upon its mass organizations; the General Confederation of Labour of Martinique, the Martinican Communist Youth Union and the Union of Martinican Women. PCM conducted extensive work amongst the peasant population. At the time the policy of PCM stressed the specific conditions of the historical development of Martinique, the immediate need of a broad front to fight for autonomy for establishing 'democratic power, under control the masses, while maintaining economic and cultural ties with France'. In 1971 the general secretary of the party was Armand Nicolas.

PCM participated in the 1960 and 1969 International Meetings of Communist and Workers Parties held in Moscow. The party was represented by the politburo member Walter Guitteaud in the latter event. The Central Committee of PCM approved the documents adopted by these meetings.

In 1992, Emile Capgras, a Central Committee member of PCM since 1968, was elected President of the Regional Council of Martinique.

In the 1994 European Parliament election, the PCM general secretary Georges Erichot was the nr. 12 candidate on the French Communist Party list.

In the 1998 Martinique regional assembly election PCM got 7.4% of the votes and four assembly seats.

== Organization ==
Organizationally, PCM was built along the principles of democratic centralism, with the party congress as the highest organ of decision-making. The party congress elects a Central Committee and General Secretary. Plenum of the Central Committee elects a Politburo and the Secretariat of the Central Committee of the PCM, which directs the activities of the party in between party congresses. The party publishes Justice and a theoretical organ, Action.

== See also ==
- René Ménil was a leading member of the party.
