= Alfred Marie-Jeanne =

Martinican politician

President of the Executive Council of Martinique
- In office 18 December 2015 – 2 July 2021
- Succeeded by: Serge Letchimy

Deputy for Martinique's 1st constituency in the National Assembly of France
- In office 20 June 2012 – 20 June 2017
- Preceded by: Louis-Joseph Manscour
- Succeeded by: Josette Manin
- Parliamentary group: GDR

Deputy for Martinique's 4th constituency in the National Assembly of France
- In office 12 June 1997 – 19 June 2012
- Preceded by: André Lesueur
- Succeeded by: Jean-Philippe Nilor

President of the Regional Council of Martinique
- In office 20 March 1998 – 22 March 2010
- Preceded by: Emile Capgras
- Succeeded by: Serge Letchimy

Personal details
- Born: November 15, 1936 (age 89) Rivière-Pilote, Martinique
- Party: Martinican Independence Movement

Alfred Marie-Jeanne (French pronunciation: [alfʁɛd maʁi ʒan]; born November 15, 1936, in Rivière-Pilote, Martinique) is a French politician, a leader in the Martinican Independence Movement (MIM) since 1978. He served as mayor of the commune of Rivière-Pilote from 1971 to 2000 and served as President of the Regional Council of Martinique from March 20, 1998, to March 22, 2010. Alfred Marie-Jeanne represented Martinique's 1st constituency in the French National Assembly from 2012 to 2017. He was succeeded in this constituency by Josette Manin.

Gran Sanblé pour ba peyi an chans, a coalition of the Martinican Independence Movement and right-wing parties, led by Alfred Marie-Jeanne, defeated Ensemble pour une Martinique Nouvelle, a coalition of left-wing parties, led by Serge Letchimy, winning 33 seats out of 51 seats of the Territorial Collectivity's new assembly during the election held on December 13, 2015, in Martinique. Alfred Marie-Jeanne served as the president of the executive council of the Territorial Collectivity of Martinique from 2015 to 2021.
