= Camille Darsières =

French politician

- Parliamentary group: Socialist (Associated)

Deputy for Martinique's 3rd constituency in the National Assembly of France
- In office 2 April 1993 – 18 June 2002
- Preceded by: Aimé Césaire
- Succeeded by: Pierre-Jean Samot

Personal details
- Born: 19 May 1932 Fort-de-France, Martinique
- Died: 14 December 2006 (aged 74)
- Party: Martinican Progressive Party

Camille Darsières (born 19 May 1932 in Fort-de-France, Martinique; died 14 December 2006) was a socialist politician from Martinique who served as the Deputy for Martinique's 3rd constituency in the French National Assembly from 1993 to 2002. He was a member of the Martinican Progressive Party and succeeded the founder of that party, Aimé Césaire in the constituency.
