= Jean-Philippe Nilor =

French politician

Jean-Philippe Nilor (born 15 May 1965 in Fort-de-France, Martinique) is a French politician who was elected to the French National Assembly on 17 June 2012, representing Martinique's 4th constituency.

He was reelected in the 2022 French legislative election as a candidate from Péyi-A (NUPES). He was reelected in the 2024 election.
