= Assembly of Martinique =

Deliberative assembly

Assembly of Martinique Assemblée de Martinique
- Logo of the territorial collectivity of Martinique

Type
- Type: Deliberative assembly for the Single territorial collectivity of Martinique

Leadership
- President: Lucien Saliber, (DVG) since 2 July 2021

Structure
- Seats: 51
- Political groups: Government (26): PPM (26); Opposition (25): MIM-Palima-ME (14); DVG (6); Péyi A-RDM (5)

Elections
- Voting system: Proportional two-round ballot with majority bonus
- First election: 13 December 2015
- Last election: 20 June 2021
- Next election: March 2028

The Assembly of Martinique is the deliberative assembly of Martinique, which is a single territorial collectivity of France. In 2015 it replaced both the Regional and General Councils of Martinique.

== Voting method ==
The Martinican assembly is made up of 51 members, who are elected for six year terms.

The voting system is similar to that used for regional elections: it is a multi-member proportional election with two rounds with majority bonus. In the first round, if a list receives the absolute majority of the votes cast, it receives a premium of 11 seats and the remaining seats are allocated to all the lists having received at least 5% of the votes cast.

If no list receives the absolute majority, a second round takes place: the list which comes first in the second round receives the premium of 11 seats and the remaining seats are allocated to all the lists having received at least 5% of the votes cast. For the distribution of seats within each list, the territory of Martinique is divided into four electoral sections corresponding to the legislative constituencies.

== Current membership ==
The first elections for the assembly were held on 13 December 2015. Gran Sanblé pou ba peyi an chans, a coalition of the Martinican Independence Movement and right-wing parties, led by Alfred Marie-Jeanne, defeated Ensemble pour une Martinique Nouvelle, a coalition of left-wing parties, led by Serge Letchimy, winning 33 out of 51 seats.

== International affiliations ==
- Association of Caribbean States
- Caribbean Community
- Organisation of Eastern Caribbean States
- United Nations Economic Commission for Latin America and the Caribbean
