= Build the Martinique Country =

Political party in Martinique

- President: Pierre Samot
- Secretary-General: David Zobda
- Founded: 1998
- Headquarters: Le Lamentin
- Ideology: Post-Marxism; Autonomism (until 2019); Martinican independence (since 2019)
- National affiliation: Socialists and affiliated group

Party flag

Build the Martinique Country (French: Bâtir le Pays Martinique) is a left-wing political party in the French département d'outre-mer of Martinique. It previously had one seat in the French National Assembly, held by Josette Manin.
