= List of MPs who lost their seat in the 2022 French legislative election =

This is a list of members of Parliament (MPs) who lost their seat in the 2022 French legislative election. All of these deputies sat in the 15th legislature of the French Fifth Republic but were not returned to the French Parliament in the election.

== List ==
Alliance	Party	Name	Constituency	Year elected	Seat held by party since	Defeated by	Party
Ensemble	LREM	Stéphane Trompille	Ain's 4th constituency	2017	2017	Jérôme Buisson	RN
Ensemble	LREM	Aude Bono-Vandorme	Aisne's 1st constituency	2017	2017	Nicolas Dragon	RN
Ensemble	LREM	Marc Delatte	Aisne's 4th constituency	2017	2017	José Beaurain	RN
Ensemble	LREM	Laurence Vanceunebrock-Mialon	Allier's 2nd constituency	2017	2017	Jorys Bovet	RN
Ensemble	LREM	Bénédicte Peyrol	Allier's 3rd constituency	2017	2017	Nicolas Ray	LR (Note: Part of the UDC alliance.)
Ensemble	LREM	Christophe Castaner	Alpes-de-Haute-Provence's 2nd constituency	2017	2017	Léo Walter	LFI (Note: Part of the NUPES alliance.)
Ensemble	LREM	Alexandra Valetta-Ardisson	Alpes-Maritimes's 4th constituency	2017	2017	Alexandra Masson	RN
Ensemble	LREM	Grégory Besson-Moreau	Aube's 1st constituency	2017	2017	Jordan Guitton	RN
Ensemble	LREM	Danièle Hérin	Aude's 1st constituency	2017	2017	Christophe Barthès	RN
Ensemble	LREM	Alain Péréa	Aude's 2nd constituency	2017	2017	Frédéric Falcon	RN
Ensemble	LREM	Mireille Robert	Aude's 3rd constituency	2017	2017	Julien Rancoule	RN
Ensemble	LREM	Alexandra Louis	Bouches-du-Rhône's 3rd constituency	2017	2017	Gisèle Lelouis	RN
Ensemble	LREM	Cathy Racon-Bouzon	Bouches-du-Rhône's 5th constituency	2017	2017	Hendrik Davi	LFI
Ensemble	LREM	Saïd Ahamada	Bouches-du-Rhône's 7th constituency	2017	2017	Sébastien Delogu	LFI
Ensemble	LREM	Christophe Jerretie	Corrèze's 1st constituency	2017	2017	Francis Dubois	LR
Ensemble	LREM	Yolaine de Courson	Côte-d'Or's 4th constituency	2017	2017	Hubert Brigand	LR
Ensemble	LREM	Yannick Kerlogot	Côtes-d'Armor's 4th constituency	2017	2017	Murielle Lepvraud	LFI
Ensemble	LREM	Jean-Baptiste Moreau	Creuse's constituency	2017	2017	Catherine Couturier	LFI
Ensemble	LREM	Philippe Chassaing	Dordogne's 1st constituency	2017	2017	Pascale Martin	LFI
Ensemble	LREM	Michel Delpon	Dordogne's 2nd constituency	2017	2017	Serge Muller	RN
Ensemble	LREM	Frédéric Barbier	Doubs's 4th constituency	2015	2017	Géraldine Grangier	RN
Ensemble	LREM	Célia De Lavergne	Drôme's 3rd constituency	2017	2017	Marie Pochon	EELV
Ensemble	LREM	Séverine Gipson	Eure's 1st constituency	2017	2017	Christine Loir	RN
Ensemble	LREM	Fabien Gouttefarde	Eure's 2nd constituency	2017	2017	Katiana Levavasseur	RN
Ensemble	LREM	Marie Tamarelle-Verhaeghe	Eure's 3rd constituency	2017	2017	Kévin Mauvieux	RN
Ensemble	LREM	Bruno Questel	Eure's 4th constituency	2017	2017	Philippe Brun	PS
Ensemble	LREM	Catherine Daufès-Roux	Finistère's 6th constituency	2012	2017 (Note: Incumbent first elected as a legislator for PS before switching party allegiance to LREM in 2017.)	Mélanie Thomin	PS
Ensemble	LREM	Françoise Dumas	Gard's 1st constituency	2012	2017	Yoann Gillet	RN
Ensemble	LREM	Anthony Cellier	Gard's 3rd constituency	2017	2017	Pascale Bordes	RN
Ensemble	LREM	Catherine Daufès-Roux	Gard's 5th constituency	2021	2017	Michel Sala	LFI
Ensemble	LREM	Élisabeth Toutut-Picard	Haute-Garonne's 7th constituency	2017	2017	Christophe Bex	LFI
Ensemble	LREM	Sandrine Mörch	Haute-Garonne's 9th constituency	2017	2017	Christine Arrighi	EELV
Ensemble	LREM	Catherine Fabre	Gironde's 2nd constituency	2017	2017	Nicolas Thierry	EELV
Ensemble	LREM	Véronique Hammerer	Gironde's 11th constituency	2017	2017	Edwige Diaz	RN
Ensemble	LREM	Jean-François Eliaou	Hérault's 4th constituency	2017	2017	Sébastien Rome	LFI
Ensemble	LREM	Philippe Huppé	Hérault's 5th constituency	2017	2017	Stéphanie Galzy	RN
Ensemble	LREM	Christophe Euzet	Hérault's 7th constituency	2017	2017	Aurélien Lopez-Liguori	RN
Ensemble	LREM	Florian Bachelier	Ille-et-Vilaine's 8th constituency	2017	2017	Mickaël Bouloux	PS
Ensemble	LREM	Philippe Chalumeau	Indre-et-Loire's 1st constituency	2017	2017	Charles Fournier	EELV
Ensemble	LREM	Jean-Charles Colas-Roy	Isère's 2nd constituency	2017	2017	Cyrielle Chatelain	EELV
Ensemble	LREM	Émilie Chalas	Isère's 3rd constituency	2017	2017	Élisa Martin	LFI
Ensemble	LREM	Jean-Michel Mis	Loire's 2nd constituency	2017	2017	Andrée Taurinya	LFI
Ensemble	LREM	Nathalie Sarles	Loire's 5th constituency	2017	2017	Antoine Vermorel-Marques	LR
Ensemble	LREM	Valérie Oppelt	Loire-Atlantique's 2nd constituency	2017	2017	Andy Kerbrat	LFI
Ensemble	LREM	Anne-France Brunet	Loire-Atlantique's 3rd constituency	2017	2017	Ségolène Amiot	LFI
Ensemble	LREM	Aude Amadou	Loire-Atlantique's 4th constituency	2017	2017	Julie Laernoes	EELV
Ensemble	LREM	Audrey Dufeu-Schubert	Loire-Atlantique's 8th constituency	2017	2017	Matthias Tavel	LFI
Ensemble	LREM	Alexandre Freschi	Lot-et-Garonne's 2nd constituency	2017	2017	Hélène Laporte	RN
Ensemble	LREM	Olivier Damaisin	Lot-et-Garonne's 3rd constituency	2017	2017	Annick Cousin	RN
Ensemble	LREM	Sonia Krimi	Manche's 4th constituency	2017	2017	Anna Pic	PS
Ensemble	LREM	Xavier Paluszkiewicz	Meurthe-et-Moselle's 3rd constituency	2017	2017	Martine Étienne	LFI
Ensemble	LREM	Richard Lioger	Moselle's 3rd constituency	2017	2017	Charlotte Leduc	LFI
Ensemble	LREM	Nicole Gries-Trisse	Moselle's 5th constituency	2017	2017	Vincent Seitlinger	LR
Ensemble	LREM	Christophe Arend	Moselle's 6th constituency	2017	2017	Kévin Pfeffer	RN
Ensemble	LREM	Hélène Zannier	Moselle's 7th constituency	2017	2017	Alexandre Loubet	RN
Ensemble	LREM	Christophe Di Pompeo	Nord's 3rd constituency	2017	2017	Benjamin Saint-Huile	DVG
Ensemble	LREM	Catherine Osson	Nord's 8th constituency	2017	2017	David Guiraud	LFI
Ensemble	LREM	Florence Morlighem	Nord's 11th constituency	2017	2017	Roger Vicot	PS
Ensemble	LREM	Anne-Laure Cattelot	Nord's 12th constituency	2017	2017	Michaël Taverne	RN
Ensemble	LREM	Pascal Bois	Oise's 3rd constituency	2017	2017	Alexandre Sabatou	RN
Ensemble	LREM	Carole Bureau-Bonnard	Oise's 6th constituency	2017	2017	Michel Guiniot	RN
Ensemble	LREM	Brigitte Bourguignon	Pas-de-Calais's 6th constituency	2017	2017	Christine Engrand	RN
Ensemble	LREM	Valérie Thomas	Puy-de-Dôme's 1st constituency	2017	2017	Marianne Maximi	LFI
Ensemble	LREM	Jean-Bernard Sempastous	Hautes-Pyrénées's 1st constituency	2017	2017	Sylvie Ferrer	LFI
Ensemble	LREM	Romain Grau	Pyrénées-Orientales's 1st constituency	2017	2017	Sophie Blanc	RN
Ensemble	LREM	Sébastien Cazenove	Pyrénées-Orientales's 4th constituency	2017	2017	Michèle Martinez	RN
Ensemble	LREM	Anissa Khedher	Rhône's 7th constituency	2017	2017	Alexandre Vincendet	LR
Ensemble	LREM	Yves Blein	Rhône's 14th constituency	2012	2017	Idir Boumertit	LFI
Ensemble	LREM	Barbara Bessot Ballot	Haute-Saône's 1st constituency	2017	2017	Antoine Villedieu	RN
Ensemble	LREM	Christophe Lejeune	Haute-Saône's 2nd constituency	2017	2017	Emeric Salmon	RN
Ensemble	LREM	Laetitia Avia	Paris's 8th constituency	2017	2017	Éva Sas	EELV
Ensemble	LREM	Buon Tan	Paris's 9th constituency	2017	2017	Sandrine Rousseau	EELV
Ensemble	LREM	Anne-Christine Lang	Paris's 10th constituency	2017	2017	Rodrigo Arenas	LFI
Ensemble	LREM	Sira Sylla	Seine-Maritime's 4th constituency	2017	2017	Alma Dufour	LFI
Ensemble	LREM	Rodrigue Kokouendo	Seine-et-Marne's 7th constituency	2017	2017	Ersilia Soudais	LFI
Ensemble	LREM	Stéphanie Do	Seine-et-Marne's 10th constituency	2017	2017	Maxime Laisney	LFI
Ensemble	LREM	Jean-Claude Leclabart	Somme's 4th constituency	2017	2017	Jean-Philippe Tanguy	RN
Ensemble	LREM	Muriel Roques-Étienne	Tarn's 1st constituency	2020	2017	Frédéric Cabrolier	RN
Ensemble	LREM	Marie-Christine Verdier-Jouclas	Tarn's 2nd constituency	2017	2017	Karen Erodi	LFI
Ensemble	LREM	Sereine Mauborgne	Var's 4th constituency	2017	2017	Philippe Lottiaux	RN
Ensemble	LREM	Valérie Gomez-Bassac	Var's 6th constituency	2017	2017	Frank Giletti	RN
Ensemble	LREM	Fabien Matras	Var's 8th constituency	2017	2017	Philippe Schreck	RN
Ensemble	LREM	Souad Zitouni	Vaucluse's 1st constituency	2017	2017	Joris Hébrard	RN
Ensemble	LREM	Adrien Morenas	Vaucluse's 3rd constituency	2017	2017	Hervé de Lépinau	RN
Ensemble	LREM	Martine Leguille-Balloy	Vendée's 4th constituency	2017	2017	Véronique Besse	DVD
Ensemble	LREM	Françoise Ballet-Blu	Vienne's 1st constituency	2020	2017	Lisa Belluco	EELV
Ensemble	LREM	Sophie Beaudouin-Hubière	Haute-Vienne's 1st constituency	2017	2017	Damien Maudet	LFI
Ensemble	LREM	Laurianne Rossi	Hauts-de-Seine's 11th constituency	2017	2017	Aurélien Saintoul	LFI
Ensemble	LREM	Patrice Anato	Seine-Saint-Denis's 3rd constituency	2017	2017	Thomas Portes	LFI
Ensemble	LREM	Sylvie Charrière	Seine-Saint-Denis's 8th constituency	2017	2017	Fatiha Keloua-Hachi	PS
Ensemble	LREM	Stéphane Testé	Seine-Saint-Denis's 12th constituency	2017	2017	Jérôme Legavre	LFI
Ensemble	LREM	Jean François Mbaye	Val-de-Marne's 2nd constituency	2017	2017	Clémence Guetté	LFI
Ensemble	LREM	Laurent Saint-Martin	Val-de-Marne's 3rd constituency	2017	2017	Louis Boyard	LFI
Ensemble	LREM	Fiona Lazaar	Val-d'Oise's 5th constituency	2017	2017	Paul Vannier	LFI
Ensemble	LREM	Zivka Park	Val-d'Oise's 9th constituency	2017	2017	Arnaud Le Gall	LFI
Ensemble	LREM	Lénaïck Adam	French Guiana's 2nd constituency	2018	2018	Davy Rimane	DVG (Note: Legislator endorsed by NUPES.)
Ensemble	LREM	Ramlati Ali	Mayotte's 1st constituency	2018	2018 (Note: Incumbent elected as a legislator for PS but sat in the LREM group.)	Estelle Youssouffa	DVD
Ensemble	MoDem	Nadia Essayan	Cher's 2nd constituency	2017	2017	Nicolas Sansu	PCF
Ensemble	MoDem	Jean-Luc Lagleize	Haute-Garonne's 2nd constituency	2017	2017	Anne Stambach-Terrenoir	LFI
Ensemble	MoDem	Brahim Hammouche	Moselle's 8th constituency	2017	2017	Laurent Jacobelli	RN
Ensemble	MoDem	Bruno Duvergé	Pas-de-Calais's 1st constituency	2017	2017	Emmanuel Blairy	RN
Ensemble	MoDem	Marguerite Deprez-Audebert	Pas-de-Calais's 9th constituency	2017	2017	Caroline Parmentier	RN
Ensemble	MoDem	Sylvain Waserman	Bas-Rhin's 2nd constituency	2017	2017	Emmanuel Fernandes	LFI
Ensemble	MoDem	Patrick Mignola	Savoie's 4th constituency	2017	2017	Jean-François Coulomme	LFI
Ensemble	MoDem	Philippe Michel-Kleisbauer	Var's 5th constituency	2017	2017	Julie Lechanteux	RN
Ensemble	MoDem	Michèle Crouzet	Yonne's 3rd constituency	2017	2017	Julien Odoul	RN
Ensemble	MoDem	Isabelle Florennes	Hauts-de-Seine's 4th constituency	2017	2017	Sabrina Sebaihi	EELV
Ensemble	MoDem	François Pupponi	Val-d'Oise's 8th constituency	2017	2017	Paul Vannier	LFI
Ensemble	Horizons	Loïc Dombreval	Alpes-Maritimes's 2nd constituency	2017	2017	Lionel Tivoli	RN
Ensemble	Horizons	Marine Brenier	Alpes-Maritimes's 5th constituency	2016	2021	Christelle d’Intorni	LR
Ensemble	Horizons	Cendra Motin	Isère's 6th constituency	2017	2017	Alexis Jolly	RN
Ensemble	Horizons	Julien Borowczyk	Loire's 6th constituency	2017	2017	Jean-Pierre Taite	LR
Ensemble	Horizons	Dimitri Houbron	Nord's 17th constituency	2017	2017	Thibaut François	RN
Ensemble	Horizons	Benoît Potterie	Pas-de-Calais's 8th constituency	2017	2017	Bertrand Petit	DVG
Ensemble	Horizons	Pierre-Yves Bournazel	Paris's 18th constituency	2017	2017	Aymeric Caron	LFI
UDC	LR	Laurence Trastour-Isnart	Alpes-Maritimes's 6th constituency	2017	1988 (Note: Previous legislator elected for the predecessor party RPR.)	Bryan Masson	RN
UDC	LR	Éric Diard	Bouches-du-Rhône's 12th constituency	2017	2017	Franck Allisio	RN
UDC	LR	Bernard Reynès	Bouches-du-Rhône's 15th constituency	2007	2002	Romain Baubry	RN
UDC	LR	Nathalie Porte	Calvados's 3rd constituency	2020	2017	Jérémie Patrier-Leitus	Horizons (Note: Part of the Ensemble alliance.)
UDC	LR	Didier Quentin	Charente-Maritime's 5th constituency	1997	1962 (Note: Previous legislator elected for the predecessor party UNR.)	Christophe Plassard	Horizons
UDC	LR	Claude de Ganay	Loiret's 3rd constituency	2012	2002	Mathilde Paris	RN
UDC	LR	Sébastien Huyghe	Nord's 5th constituency	2002	2002	Victor Catteau	RN
UDC	LR	Valérie Beauvais	Marne's 1st constituency	2017	1988	Xavier Albertini	Horizons
UDC	LR	François Cornut-Gentille	Haute-Marne's 2nd constituency	2017	1993	Laurence Robert-Dehault	RN
UDC	LR	Philippe Mayer	Bas-Rhin's 6th constituency	2020	2012	Louise Morel	MoDem
UDC	LR	Yves Hemedinger	Haut-Rhin's 1st constituency	2020	1993	Brigitte Klinkert	LREM
UDC	LR	Jacques Cattin	Haut-Rhin's 2nd constituency	2017	1997	Hubert Ott	MoDem
UDC	LR	Brigitte Kuster	Paris's 4th constituency	2017	2012	Astrid Panosyan-Bouvet	LREM
UDC	LR	Michel Vialay	Yvelines's 8th constituency	2017	2017	Benjamin Lucas	G.s
UDC	LR	Julien Aubert	Vaucluse's 5th constituency	2012	2012	Jean-François Lovisolo	LREM
UDC	LR	Guillaume Larrivé	Yonne's 1st constituency	2012	2002	Daniel Grenon	RN
UDC	LR	Alain Ramadier	Seine-Saint-Denis's 10th constituency	2017	2017	Nadège Abomangoli	LFI
UDC	LR	Antoine Savignat	Val-d'Oise's 1st constituency	2018	2018	Jerôme Buisson	Agir
UDC	LR	David Lorion	Réunion's 4th constituency	2017	2017	Emeline K'Bidi	LFI
UDC	LR	Nadia Ramassamy	Réunion's 6th constituency	2017	2017	Frédéric Maillot	DVG
UDC	LR	Claire Guion-Firmin	Saint-Barthélemy and Saint-Martin's 1st constituency	2017	2012	Frantz Gumbs	LREM
UDC	UDI	Sophie Métadier	Indre-et-Loire's 3rd constituency	2021	2017	Henri Alfandari	Horizons
UDC	UDI	Pascal Brindeau	Loir-et-Cher's 3rd constituency	2017	2019	Christophe Marion	LREM
UDC	UDI	Valérie Six	Nord's 7th constituency	2017	2020	Félicie Gérard	Horizons
UDC	UDI	Agnès Thill	Oise's 2nd constituency	2017	2019 (Note: Incumbent elected as a legislator for LREM.)	Philippe Ballard	RN
UDC	UDI	Grégory Labille	Somme's 5th constituency	2020	2020	Yaël Ménache	RN
UDC	UDI	Philippe Benassaya	Yvelines's 11th constituency	2020	2020	William Martinet	LFI
UDC	UDI	Michel Zumkeller	Territoire de Belfort's 2nd constituency	2002	2002	Florian Chauche	LFI
UDC	UDI	Jean-Christophe Lagarde	Seine-Saint-Denis's 5th constituency	2002	2017	Raquel Garrido	LFI
NUPES	GÉ	Cédric Villani	Essonne's 5th constituency	2017	2020 (Note: Incumbent elected as a legislator for LREM but switched party allegiance to GÉ in 2020.)	Paul Midy	LREM
NUPES	LFI	Michel Larive	Ariège's 2nd constituency	2017	2017	Laurent Panifous	DVG
NUPES	ND	Delphine Bagarry	Alpes-de-Haute-Provence's 1st constituency	2017	2020 (Note: Incumbent elected as a legislator for LREM but switched party allegiance to ND in 2020.)	Christian Girard	RN
NUPES	PCF	Alain Bruneel	Nord's 16th constituency	2017	2007	Matthieu Marchio	RN
No alliance	DVG	Jérôme Lambert	Charente's 3rd constituency	1997	1997 (Note: Incumbent elected as a legislator for PS.)	Caroline Colombier	RN
No alliance	DVG	Muriel Ressiguier	Hérault's 2nd constituency	2017	2017 (Note: Incumbent elected as a legislator for LFI.)	Nathalie Oziol	LFI
No alliance	DVG	Sylvie Tolmont	Sarthe's 4th constituency	2012	2012 (Note: Previous and incumbent legislator elected for PS.)	Elise Leboucher	LFI
No alliance	DVG	Lamia El Aaraje	Paris's 15th constituency	2021	2021 (Note: Incumbent elected as a legislator for PS, ran a dissident campaign with partial support from her party.)	Danielle Simonnet	LFI
No alliance	DVG	Guillaume Chiche	Deux-Sèvres's 1st constituency	2017	2017	Bastien Marchive	PRV
No alliance	DVG	Jean-Michel Clément	Vienne's 3rd constituency	2007	2017	Pascal Lecamp	MoDem
No alliance	DVG	Justine Benin	Guadeloupe's 2nd constituency	2017	2012 (Note: Incumbent affiliated with MoDem.)	Christian Baptiste	PPDG
No alliance	DVC	Jacqueline Dubois	Dordogne's 4th constituency	2017	2017	Sébastien Peytavie	G.s
No alliance	DVC	Benoît Simian	Gironde's 5th constituency	2017	2017	Grégoire De Fournas	RN
No alliance	DVC	Aina Kuric	Marne's 2nd constituency	2017	2017	Anne-Sophie Frigout	RN
No alliance	DVC	Stéphanie Kerbarh	Seine-Maritime's 9th constituency	2017	2017	Marie-Agnès Poussier-Winsback	LREM
No alliance	DVC	Nathalie Élimas	Val-d'Oise's 6th constituency	2017	2017 (Note: Incumbent elected as a legislator for MoDem)	Estelle Folest	MoDem
No alliance	DVC	M'jid El Guerrab	Ninth constituency for French residents overseas	2017	2018 (Note: Incumbent elected as a legislator for LREM but resigned from the party in 2018. Subsequently withdrew from the campaign after being convicted but still appeared on the ballot.)	Karim Ben Cheïkh	G.s
No alliance	REC	Guillaume Peltier	Loir-et-Cher's 2nd constituency	2017	2022 (Note: Incumbent elected as a legislator for LR but switched party allegiance to REC in 2022.)	Roger Chudeau	RN
No alliance	REC	Myriane Houplain	Pas-de-Calais's 10th constituency	2021	2022 (Note: Incumbent elected as a legislator for RN but switched party allegiance to REC in 2022.)	Thierry Frappé	RN
No alliance	A here ia (Note: Party affiliated with FN.)	Nicole Sanquer	French Polynesia's 2nd constituency	2017	2017	Steve Chailloux	TH
No alliance	DVD	Joachim Son-Forget	Sixth constituency for French residents overseas	2017	2022 (Note: Incumbent elected as a legislator for LREM but switched party allegiance to REC in 2022.)	Marc Ferracci	LREM
No alliance	EPL	Martine Wonner	Bas-Rhin's 4th constituency	2017	2017	Françoise Buffet	LREM
No alliance	PRG	Sylvia Pinel	Tarn-et-Garonne's 2nd constituency	2012	2012	Marine Hamelet	RN

== Open seats changing hands ==
- Ain's 2nd constituency (MoDem gain from LR)
- Aisne's 5th constituency (RN gain from LREM)
- Aveyron's 2nd constituency (LFI gain from LREM)
- Essonne's 2nd constituency (RN gain from LR)
- Paris's 14th constituency
- Seine-et-Marne's 2nd constituency
- Val-de-Marne's 5th constituency
- Val-de-Marne's 7th constituency
- Var's 3rd constituency
- Ninth constituency for French residents overseas

== See also ==
- List of MPs who lost their seat in the 2024 French legislative election
- Election results of Cabinet Ministers during the 2022 French legislative election
- List of MPs who lost their seat in the 2017 French legislative election
- Results of the 2022 French legislative election by constituency
