= Election results of Cabinet Ministers during the 2022 French legislative election =

This is a regrouping of the election results for cabinet ministers during the 2022 French legislative election.

== Context ==
On 20 May 2022, President Emmanuel Macron and Prime Minister Élisabeth Borne composed a government of 27 members. The Élysée announced in stride that all ministers which presented themselves in the legislative elections on 12–19 June 2022 would have to resign from their posts if they were not elected. 15 members of government are candidates include the Prime Minister, who is a candidate for the first time in Calvados's 6th constituency.

=== Non-candidate ministers ===
Ministers who did not present themselves during the election included:

- Bruno Le Maire, Minister of the Economy, Finance and Industrial and Digital Sovereignty
- Catherine Colonna, Minister of Europe and Foreign Affairs
- Éric Dupond-Moretti, Minister of Justice, Keeper of the Seals
- Pap Ndiaye, Minister of National Education and Youth
- Sébastien Lecornu, Minister of the Armed Forces
- Sylvie Retailleau, Minister of Higher Education and Research
- Rima Abdul-Malak, Minister of Culture
- Agnès Pannier-Runacher, Minister of Ecological Transition
- Amélie Oudéa-Castéra, Minister of Sports and the Olympics and Paralympic Games
- Isabelle Lonvis-Rome, Minister Delegated for Equality between Women and Men, Diversity and Equal Opportunities
- Christophe Béchu, Secretary of State in charge of Territorial Development
- Charlotte Caubel, Secretary of State for Children
- Chrysoula Zacharopoulou, Secretary of State for Development, La Francophonie and International Partnerships

== Results ==
=== First round ===
Following the first round of voting on 12 June 2022, none of the candidates were elected or eliminated. Three ministers arrived in the second position of their respective constituencies and therefor entered the second round in an unfavourable position, they were: Clément Beaune, Stanislas Guerini and Amélie de Montchalin. The minister which obtained the best result was Gabriel Attal, with 48.06% of the vote.

=== Second round ===
During the second round, Justine Benin was beaten in Guadeloupe's 2nd constituency by the NUPES candidate, Christian Baptiste (58.65% versus 41.35%), Brigitte Bourguignon was beaten by 56 votes in the Pas-de-Calais's 6th constituency by the RN candidate, Christine Engrand (50.06% versus 49.94%), and Amélie de Montchalin was beaten in Essonne's 6th constituency by the NUPES candidate, Jérôme Guedj, deputy of the slingers faction of the PS between 2012 and 2014 and losing candidate in the 2017 legislative elections (53.36% versus 46.63%). It was the first time since the defeat of Alain Juppé in 2007 that ministers in office lost a legislative election. According to the rule decreed by the Élysée, they were all required to resign their government portfolios.

== Detailed table ==
Portrait	Government function	Name	Party	Constituency	Results		Status	
Portrait	Government function	Name	Party	Constituency	1st round	2nd round	Final result	Ref.
	Prime Minister	Élisabeth Borne	LREM; TdP	Calvados's 6th constituency First-time candidate in the constituency	34.32%	52.46%	Elected in the second round	
Ministers
	Minister of the Interior	Gérald Darmanin	LREM	Nord's 10th constituency Elected in 2012	39.08%	57.52%	Elected in the second round	
	Minister of Ecological Transition and Territorial Cohension	Amélie de Montchalin	LREM	Essonne's 6th constituency Elected in 2017	31.46%	46.63%	Defeated in the second round	
	Minister of Health and Prevention	Brigitte Bourguignon	LREM; TdP	Pas-de-Calais's 6th constituency Elected in 2012, 2017, and 2021	32.10%	49.94%	Defeated in the second round	
	Minister of Labour, Full Employment and Integration	Olivier Dussopt	TdP	Ardèche's 2nd constituency Elected in 2007, 2012, and 2017	30.04%	58.86%	Elected in the second round	
	Minister of Solidarity, Autonomy and People with Disabilities	Damien Abad	DVD	Ain's 5th constituency Elected in 2012 and 2017	33.38%	57.86%	Elected in the second round	
	Minister of Agriculture and Food Sovereignty	Marc Fesneau	MoDem	Loir-et-Cher's 1st constituency Elected in 2017	31.97%	56.47%	Elected in the second round	
	Minister of Transformation and Public Service	Stanislas Guerini	LREM	Paris's 3rd constituency Elected in 2017	32.50%	51.00%	Elected in the second round	
	Minister of the Overseas	Yaël Braun-Pivet	LREM	Yvelines's 5th constituency Elected in 2017	36.59%	64.62%	Elected in the second round	
Minister Delegate
	Minister Delegate in charge of Relations with Parliament and Democratic Life	Olivier Véran	LREM; TdP	Isère's 1st constituency Elected in 2017	40.50%	55.53%	Elected in the second round	
	Minister in charge of the Budget	Gabriel Attal	LREM	Hauts-de-Seine's 10th constituency Elected in 2017	48.06%	59.85%	Elected in the second round	
	Minister Delegate in charge of Foreign Trade and Attractiveness	Franck Riester	Agir	Seine-et-Marne's 5th constituency Elected in 2007, 2012, and 2017	29.27%	53.21%	Elected in the second round	
	Minister Delegate in charge of Europe	Clément Beaune	LREM; TdP	Paris's 7th constituency First-time candidate in the constituency	35.81%	50.73%	Elected in the second round	
Secretaries of State
	Secretary of State, Government Spokesperson	Olivia Grégoire	LREM	Paris's 12th constituency Elected in 2017	39.51%	68.51%	Elected in the second round	
	Secretary of State in Charge of the Sea	Justine Benin	DVC	Guadeloupe's 2nd constituency Elected in 2017	31.31%	41.35%	Defeated in the second round	

== See also ==
- Candidates in the 2022 French legislative election
- List of MPs who lost their seat in the 2022 French legislative election
- Results of the 2022 French legislative election by constituency
