= Sébastien Cazenove =

French politician (born 1976)

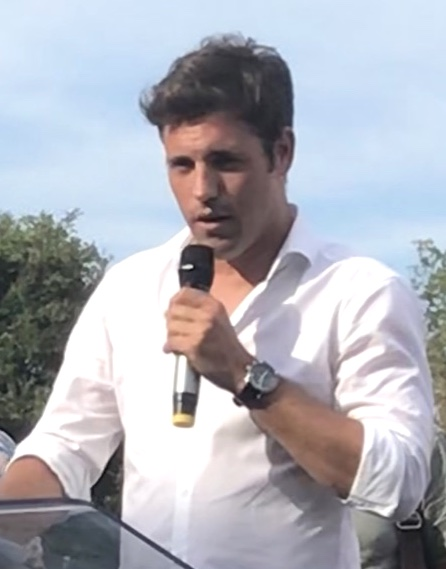

Member of the National Assembly for Pyrénées-Orientales
- In office 21 June 2017 – 21 June 2022
- Preceded by: Christian Assaf
- Succeeded by: Michèle Martinez

Personal details
- Born: 28 December 1972 (age 53) Perpignan, France
- Party: La République En Marche!

Sébastien Cazenove (born 28 December 1976) is a French politician of La République En Marche! (LREM) who served as member of the French National Assembly from 2017 to 2022 French, representing Pyrénées-Orientales's 4th constituency.

== Political career ==
In parliament, Cazenove served on the Committee on Economic Affairs. In addition to his committee assignments, he was a member of the French-Andorran Parliamentary Friendship Group.

He lost his seat to Michèle Martinez from the National Rally in the 2022 French legislative election.

== Political positions ==
In July 2019, Cazenove voted in favour of the French ratification of the European Union’s Comprehensive Economic and Trade Agreement (CETA) with Canada.

== See also ==
- 2017 French legislative election
