= Carole Bureau-Bonnard =

French politician (born 1965)

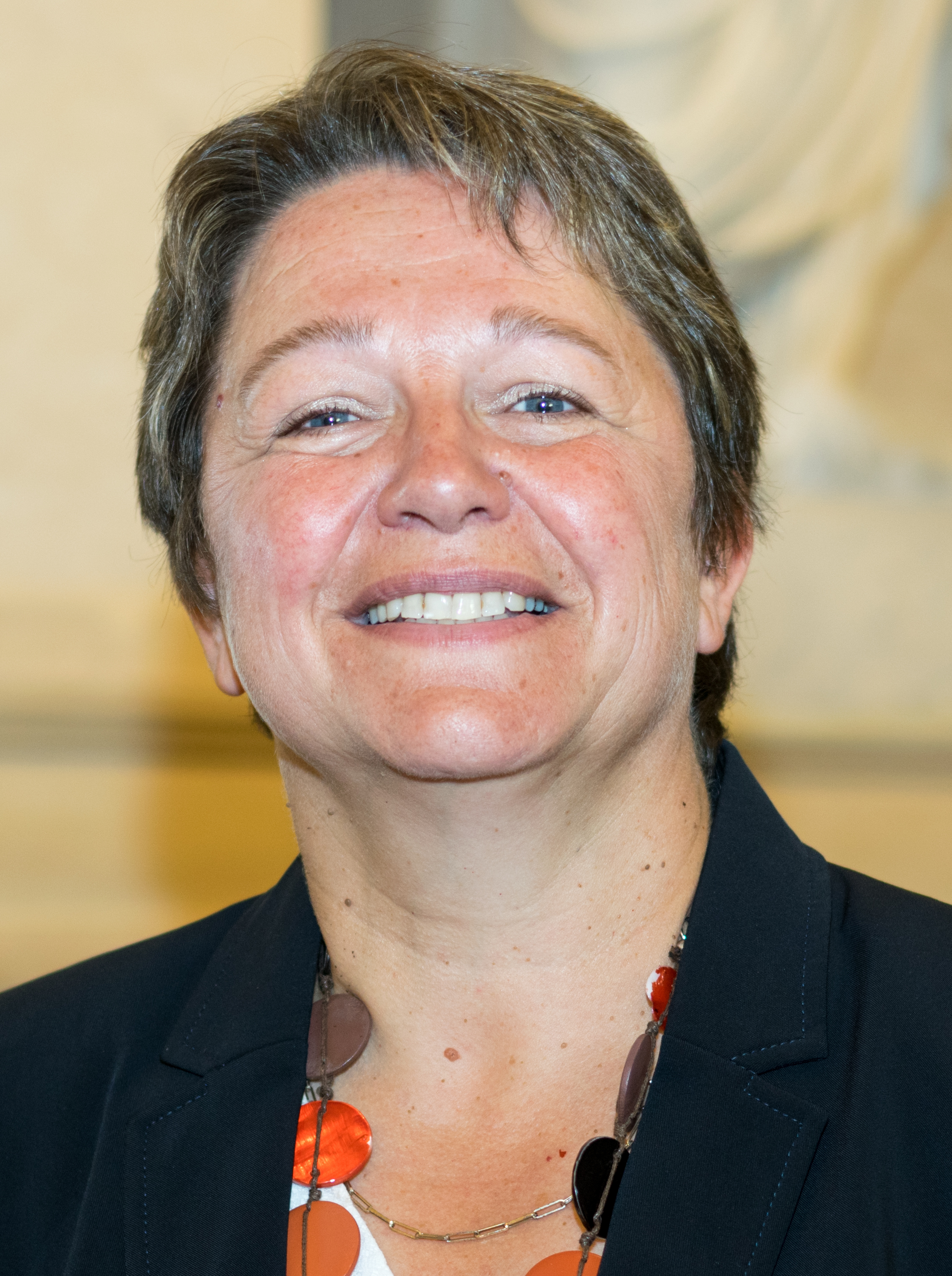

Member of the National Assembly for Oise's 6th constituency
- In office 21 June 2017 – 21 June 2022
- Preceded by: Patrice Carvalho
- Succeeded by: Michel Guiniot

Personal details
- Born: 9 August 1965 (age 60) La Fère
- Party: Renaissance

Carole Bureau-Bonnard (born 9 August 1965) is a French kinesiotherapist and politician who was elected to the National Assembly in the 2017 French legislative election, representing the department of Oise. She is a member of Renaissance (RE).

== Political career ==
In 2008, she was elected as a municipal councillor of Noyon and became, in 2010, first deputy mayor of the town. She is also elected to the community of communes of the Pays Noyonnais, of which she is vice-president.

Having previously been active for the Socialist Party, Bureau-Bonnard joined LREM in 2017.

In parliament, Bureau-Bonnard has been a member of the Defence Committee since 2017. From 2017 until 2019, she served as one of six vice-presidents of the National Assembly, under the leadership of president Richard Ferrand. In this capacity, she was in charge of the parliament's international activities.

She lost her seat in the second round of the 2022 French legislative election to National Rally candidate Michel Guiniot.

== Political positions ==
In July 2019, Bureau-Bonnard voted in favour of the French ratification of the European Union’s Comprehensive Economic and Trade Agreement (CETA) with Canada.

== Controversy ==
In 2019, Bureau-Bonnard's office in Noyon was vandalized during anti-government protests of the Yellow vests movement.

== See also ==
- 2017 French legislative election
