= Caroline Colombier =

French politician (born 1957)

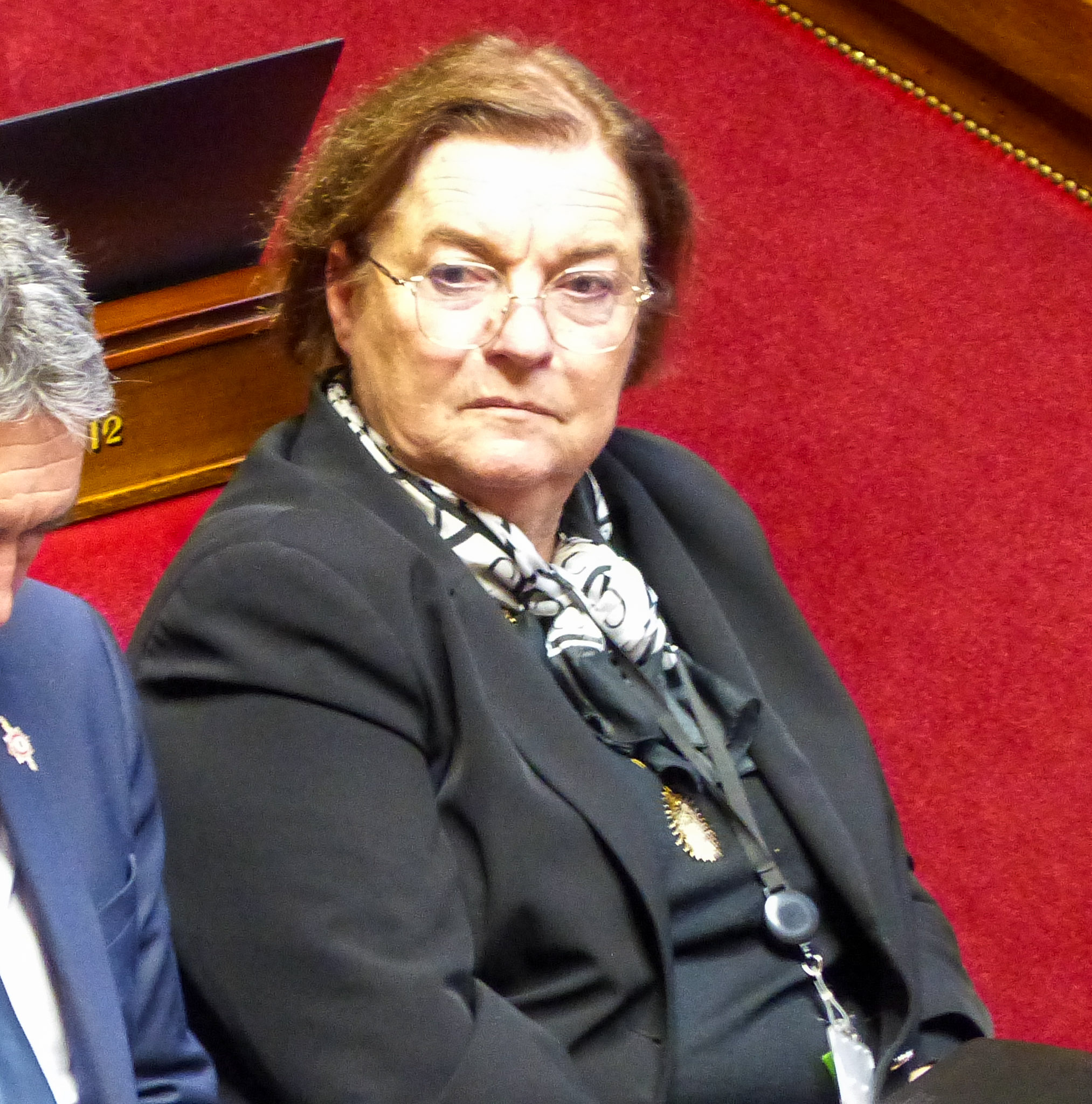

Member of the National Assembly for Charente's 3rd constituency
- Incumbent
- Assumed office 22 June 2022
- Preceded by: Jérôme Lambert

Member of the Regional Council of Nouvelle-Aquitaine
- Incumbent
- Assumed office 1 July 2021

Personal details
- Born: 22 September 1957 (age 68) Autun, France
- Party: National Rally
- Occupation: Lawyer, politician

Caroline Colombier (French pronunciation: [kaʁɔlin kɔlɔ̃bje]; born 22 August 1957) is a French lawyer and politician who has represented the 3rd constituency of the Charente department in the National Assembly since 2022. A member of the National Rally (RN), she has also been a regional councillor of Nouvelle-Aquitaine since 2021.

== Biography ==
Colombier grew up in Saône-et-Loire. Her father was author, politician and journalist Jean Bourdier, a founding member of the National Front (later National Rally) in 1972. She is the sister-in-law of politician Jacques Colombier. Her husband is originally from Charente-Maritime.

Colombier, a lawyer by occupation, is a member of the bar of Paris. She first joined the youth wing of the National Front, the Front National de la Jeunesse (now known as Génération Nation), in 1974.

She has been a member of the Regional Council of Nouvelle-Aquitaine since 2021. She won a seat in the National Assembly in the 2022 legislative election, which she contested in the 3rd constituency of Charente. Colombier won with a majority of 193 second-round votes and 50.2% of the vote. She succeeded Jérôme Lambert in Parliament, who lost his miscellaneous left reelection bid after failing to reach the second round.
