= Jean-Michel Clément =

French politician

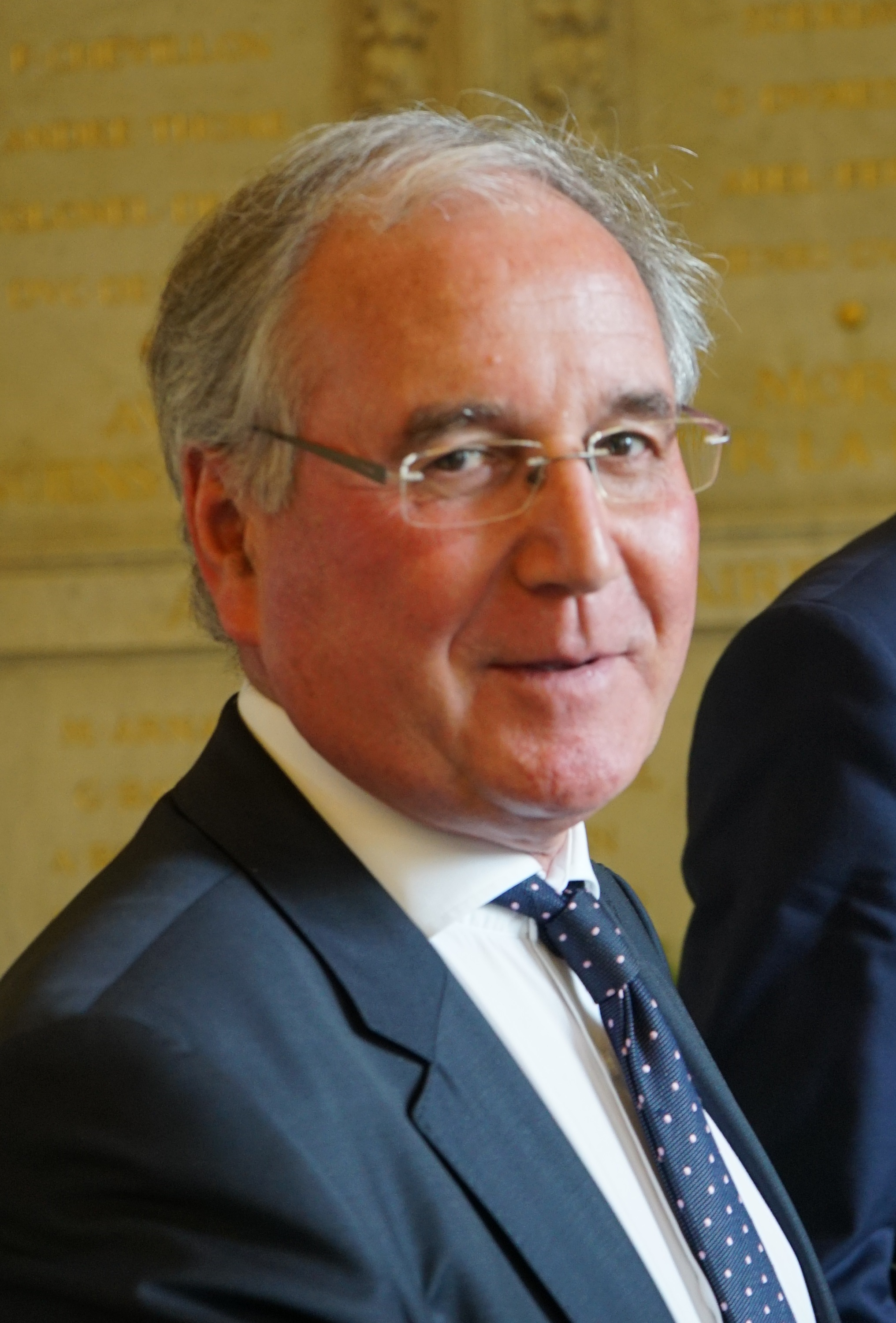
- Jean-Michel Clément in 2017

Member of the National Assembly for Vienne's 3rd constituency
- In office 20 June 2007 – June 2022
- Preceded by: Arnaud Lepercq
- Succeeded by: Pascal Lecamp

Personal details
- Born: 31 October 1954 (age 71) Mauprévoir, France
- Party: Socialist Party; La République En Marche! Place Publique
- Education: University of Poitiers

Jean-Michel Clément (born 31 October 1954) is a French politician who was a member of the National Assembly of France from the 2007 elections to 2022, representing the 3rd constituency of the Vienne department. He is a former member of La République En Marche! (LREM) and of the Socialist Party.

== Political career ==
In parliament, Clément served on the Committee on Foreign Affairs. In addition to his committee assignments, he was a member of the French-Greek Parliamentary Friendship Group and the French-Irish Parliamentary Friendship Group. From 2019, he was also a member of the French delegation to the Franco-German Parliamentary Assembly.

He was a member of the Socialist Party from 2007 to 2017. In the 2017 election he was first nominated as a socialist, then nominated by La République En Marche!

Following disagreements over a parliamentary vote on immigration in April 2018, Clément became the first lawmaker to leave then two-year-old LREM. In October 2018, he was one of the founding members of the Liberties and Territories parliamentary group.

He was a Miscellaneous left candidate in the 2022 French legislative election, he was beaten in the first round, collecting 11.98% and arriving in fourth position. He finished after candidates from the National Rally, the presidential majority and the New People's Ecological and Social Union. The seat was won in the second round by Pascal Lecamp from the Democratic Movement.
