= Gabrielle Louis-Carabin =

French politician

Member of the National Assembly
- In office 16 June 2002 – 20 June 2017
- Preceded by: Ernest Moutoussamy
- Succeeded by: Justine Benin
- Constituency: Guadeloupe's 2nd constituency

Personal details
- Born: February 20, 1946 (age 79); Le Moule, Guadeloupe, France

Gabrielle Louis-Carabin (born 20 February 1946) is a French politician who has been the mayor of Le Moule since 1989. Prior to her mayoralty she was Deputy Mayor from 1977 to 1989. She also served in the National Assembly from Guadeloupe's 2nd constituency from 2002 to 2017, and as a member of the Regional and Grand councils of Guadeloupe from 1985 to 2002.

== Early life ==
Gabrielle Louis-Carabin was born in Le Moule, Guadeloupe, on 20 February 1946.

== Career ==
Louis-Carabin was Deputy Mayor of Le Moule from 14 March 1977 to 19 March 1989, and mayor since 20 March 1989. She was a member of the General Council of Guadeloupe from 18 March 1985 to 11 July 2002, and a member of the Regional Council of Guadeloupe from 23 March 1992 to 11 July 2002.

In the 2002 election Louis-Carabin won a seat in the National Assembly from Guadeloupe's 2nd constituency. During her tenure in the assembly she served on the Social Affairs committee. She was president of the parliamentary friendship group with the Dominican Republic and vice-president of the friendship group with Haiti. During the 2012 presidential election she supported François Hollande.

During the 2012 French legislative election in Guadeloupe, Louis-Carabin was reelected as a divers gauche (miscellaneous left) candidate with 71.75% of the vote in the second round against the UMP candidate Laurent Bernier.

== Personal life ==
Louis-Carabin's first husband was André Manicom.

== Political positions ==
In 2013, Louis-Carabin was one of four members of the Socialists and affiliated group that voted against the recognition of same-sex marriage.

== Works cited ==
=== News ===
- "Les députés adoptent le projet de loi sur le mariage pour tous". Libération. 12 February 2013. Archived from the original on 29 June 2025.
- Apatout, Kristelle (9 September 2022). "Gabrielle Louis-Carabin, une enfant terrible réélue depuis plus de trente ans". France-Antilles. Archived from the original on 3 July 2025.
- Apatout, Kristelle (9 September 2022). "réélue depuis plus de trente ans". France-Antilles. Archived from the original on 3 July 2025.
- Gervais, Nicomède (12 April 2012). "Gabrielle Louis-Carabin: Ma démarche est claire, loyale et unitaire". France-Antilles. Archived from the original on 3 July 2025.

=== Web ===
- "Mme Gabrielle Louis-Carabin". National Assembly. Archived from the original on 3 July 2025.
