= Bernard Reynès =

French politician

Member of the National Assembly for Bouches-du-Rhône's 15th constituency
- In office 21 June 2007 – 21 June 2022
- Preceded by: Léon Vachet
- Succeeded by: Romain Baubry

Personal details
- Born: 18 October 1953 (age 71); Meknes, Morocco
- Political party: UMP; The Republicans
- Profession: Dentist

Bernard Reynès (born 18 October 1953) is a member of the National Assembly of France. He represented Bouches-du-Rhône's 15th constituency and is a member of the Republicans.

He lost his seat in the first round of the 2022 French legislative election.
