= Progressive Democratic Party of Guadeloupe =

Progressive Democratic Party of Guadeloupe Parti progressiste démocratique guadeloupéen
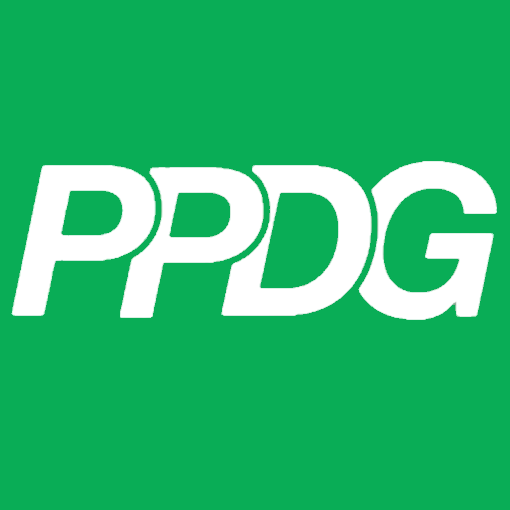
- Abbreviation: PPDG
- President: Jacques Bangou
- General Delegate: Sophie Péroumal
- Founded: 29 September 1991
- Preceded by: Guadeloupe Communist Party
- Headquarters: Pointe-à-Pitre
- Ideology: Democratic socialism; Post-Marxism; Guadeloupean autonomy
- Political position: Centre-left to left-wing
- National affiliation: Socialists and affiliated group
- Colors: Green
- National Assembly: 1 / 577

The Progressive Democratic Party of Guadeloupe (French: Parti progressiste démocratique guadeloupéen, PPDG) is a democratic socialist political party in the French overseas department of Guadeloupe. It was founded by former members of the Guadeloupe Communist Party in 1991, following the events of 1989-1991.

== Election results ==
=== 1990s ===
==== 1992 ====
The party presented for the first time in the 1992 regional elections. The list was led by Ernest Moutoussamy, obtaining 13,106 votes (10.78%) and 5 seats. The PCG led by Mona Cadoce reduced to 7,100 votes (5.84%) and just 3 seats.

==== 1993 ====
In the second round of the 1993 French Legislative Elections, Ernest Moutoussamy defeated his former comrade, Mona Cadoce of the PCG, in the Second District.

==== 1994 ====
In the European Elections, Ernest Moutoussamy led a list called "Assembly of the Overseas and Minorities" with the PPM, the PSG, and the PCR. The list won 37,041 votes (0.19%) of the total votes in France.

==== 1995 ====
It's a bad year for the PPDG, Henry Bangou lost his senate seat to the Dominique Larifla. The division of the PPDG led to his loss of the seat. Henri Bangou gathered 202 votes, and Marcelin Lubeth gathered 127 votes, but they were forced to withdraw from the second round in favour of Dominique Larifla, who arrived before them, with 260 votes.

In the municipal elections, Jérôme Cléry was defeated by Lucette Michaux-Chevry in Basse-Terre. Re-election of Ernest Moutoussamy in Saint-François, Henri Bangou in Pointe-à-Pitre and Marcellin Lubeth in Sainte-Anne.

==== 1997 ====
Ernest Moutoussamy was elected mayor of Mould.

==== 1998 ====
In the regional elections the party was in alliance with the FGPS and GUSR with Jacques Gillot (GUSR) as the head of the list. This is no match for the RPR led by Lucette Michaux-Chevry. Chevry's list (63,065 votes, 48.03%) won twice as many votes as Gillot's list (32,148 votes, 24.49%).

The party lost its influence at that time, and is moving towards an alliance with the FGPS or the GUSR depending on their respective circumstances.

=== 2000s ===
It is a traditional ally of the FGPS-Victorin Lurel.

=== 2020s ===
Christian Baptiste was elected Member of Parliament for Guadeloupe's 2nd constituency in the 2022 French legislative election with support from NUPES.
