= Pascal Lecamp =

French politician (born 1958)

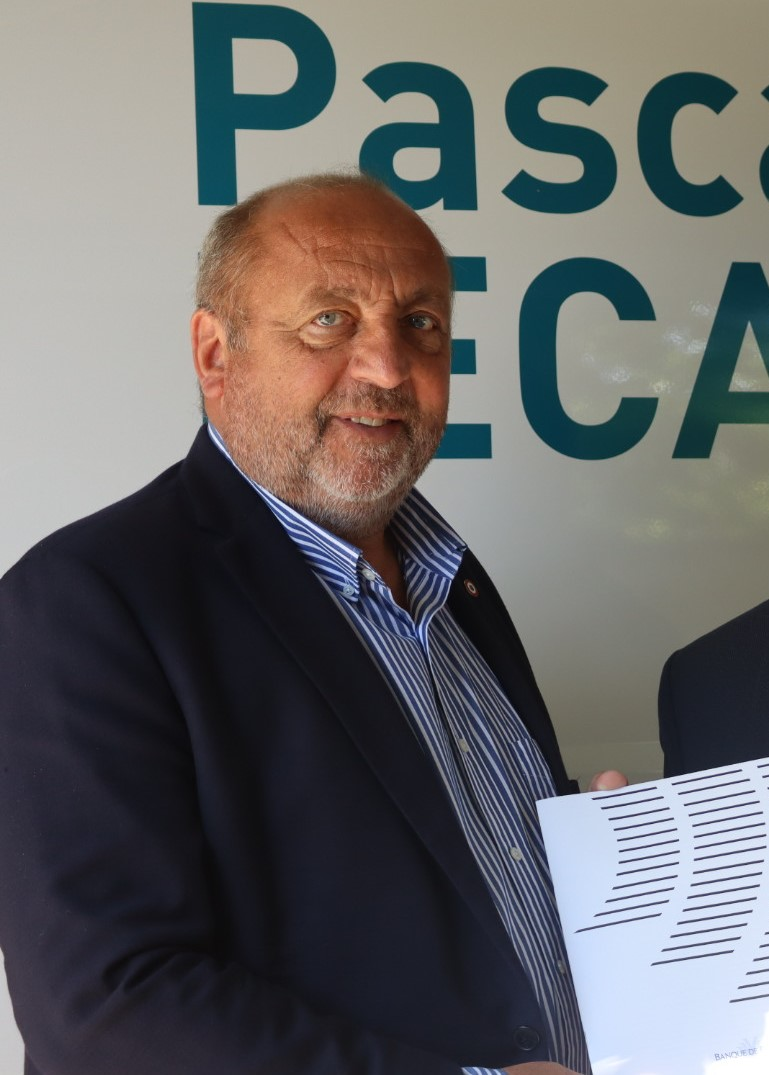

Member of the National Assembly for Vienne's 3rd constituency
- Incumbent
- Assumed office 22 June 2022
- Preceded by: Jean-Michel Clément

Personal details
- Born: 6 April 1958 (age 68) Civray, Vienne, France
- Party: Democratic Movement

Pascal Lecamp (born 6 April 1958) is a French politician from the Democratic Movement who has been representing Vienne's 3rd constituency in the National Assembly since 2022.

He was mayor of Civray from 2020 to 2022.

== Biography ==
A city councilor since 2008, Pascal Lecamp was elected mayor of Civray, Vienne in 2020.

During the 2022 legislative elections, he was elected representative of the Vienne's 3rd constituency on June 19, 2022. He is a member of the Finance Committee and coordinator of the Democratic Party's finance commissioners. In June 2023, he was rapporteur for the EU-Mercosur resolution, which opposed the draft EU-Mercosur agreement.

He was re-elected in the 2024 French legislative election. He became vice-chairman of the Economic Affairs Committee. As part of his duties, he tabled a bill to regulate agrivoltaics and was rapporteur for a law prohibiting abusive telemarketing.

== See also ==
- List of deputies of the 16th National Assembly of France
