= Oise's 6th constituency =

Constituency of the National Assembly of France

6th constituency of Oise
- inline Constituency of the National Assembly of France

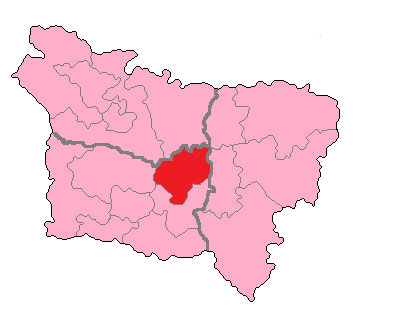
- Oise's 6th Constituency shown within Picardie
- Deputy: Michel Guiniot; RN
- Department: Oise
- Cantons: Compiègne-Nord, Guiscard, Lassigny, Noyon, Ressons-sur-Matz, Ribécourt-Dreslincourt.
- Registered voters: 74,661

The 6th constituency of Oise is a French legislative constituency in the Oise département.

== Description ==
The 6th constituency of the Oise covers the north eastern corner of the department and includes the north of Compiègne.

Two men swapped control of the seat from 1988 to 2017, Patrice Carvalho of the PCF and conservative François-Michel Gonnot.

== Historic Representation ==
Election	Member	Party
1986	Proportional representation – no election by constituency	
1988	François-Michel Gonnot	RPR
1993	François-Michel Gonnot	RPR
1997	Patrice Carvalho	PCF
2002	François-Michel Gonnot	UMP
2007	François-Michel Gonnot	UMP
2012	Patrice Carvalho	PCF
2017	Carole Bureau-Bonnard	LREM
2022	Michel Guiniot	RN

== Election results ==
=== 2024 ===
Legislative Election 2024: Oise's 6th constituency
Party	Candidate	Votes	%	±%
RN	Michel Guiniot	23,402	47.88	+19.26
LÉ–EELV (NFP)	Baptiste De Fresse de Monval	9,999	20.46	n/a
DVC	Nathalie Charruau	2,766	5.66	n/a
REC	Guy-Éric Imbert	857	1.75	−2.85
UDI (Ensemble)	Daniel Leca	11,207	22.93	n/a
LO	Jean-Marc Iskin	648	1.33	n/a
Turnout		48,879	97.32	48.74
Registered electors		75,856		
2nd round result
RN	Michel Guiniot	25,058	52.44	+4.56
UDI	Daniel Leca	22,725	47.56	+24.63
Turnout		47,783	95.72	−1.60
Registered electors		75,862		
RN hold		Swing		

=== 2022 ===
Legislative Election 2022: Oise's 6th constituency
Party	Candidate	Votes	%	±%
RN	Michel Guiniot	10,322	28.62	+7.60
LREM (Ensemble)	Carole Bureau-Bonnard	7,875	21.84	-8.20
PS (NUPÉS)	Florian Dumoulin	6,475	17.95	−10.97
LR	Anne-Sophie Fontaine	5,133	14.23	−1.77
LC	Marc-Antoine Brekiesz	2,013	5.58	N/A
REC	Guy-Eric Imbert	1,658	4.60	N/A
DVE	Elisa Escherich	942	2.41	N/A
Others	N/A	1,399	-	−
Turnout		36,063	48.52	−1.47
2nd round result
RN	Michel Guiniot	17,135	52.57	+10.97
LREM (Ensemble)	Carole Bureau-Bonnard	15,458	47.43	−10.97
Turnout		32,593	46.67	+2.16
RN gain from LREM				

=== 2017 ===
Candidate	Label	First round		Second round	
Candidate	Label	Votes	%	Votes	%
Carole Bureau-Bonnard	REM	11,091	30.04	17,619	58.40
Michel Guiniot	FN	7,759	21.02	12,548	41.60
Patrice Carvalho	PCF	6,963	18.86		
Éric de Valroger	LR	5,869	15.90		
Géraldine Minet	FI	2,692	7.29		
Caroline Marzucchetti	ECO	1,021	2.77		
Véronique Rogez	DLF	761	2.06		
Jean-Marc Iskin	EXG	354	0.96		
Marie Veryepe	DIV	283	0.77		
Garry Cambon	DIV	125	0.34		
Votes		36,918	100.00	30,167	100.00
Valid votes		36,918	98.14	30,167	90.08
Blank votes		516	1.37	2,563	7.65
Null votes		184	0.49	760	2.27
Turnout		37,618	49.99	33,490	44.51
Abstentions		37,637	50.01	41,754	55.49
Registered voters		75,255		75,244	
Source: Ministry of the Interior

=== 2012 ===
Legislative Election 2012: Oise's 6th constituency
Party	Candidate	Votes	%	±%
UMP	François-Michel Gonnot	12,333	28.54	
PCF (FG)	Patrice Carvalho	9,999	23.14	
FN	Michel Guiniot	9,578	22.16	
DVG	Jean-Pierre Cossin	8,855	20.49	
MoDem	François Menard	1,071	2.48	
Others	N/A	1,377		
Turnout		43,213	57.87	
2nd round result
PCF (FG)	Patrice Carvalho	18,332	42.71	
UMP	François-Michel Gonnot	15,862	36.95	
FN	Michel Guiniot	8,731	20.34	
Turnout		42,925	57.49	
PCF gain from UMP				

== Sources ==
Official results of French elections from 2002: "Résultats électoraux officiels en France" (in French).
