= Philippe Schreck =

French lawyer

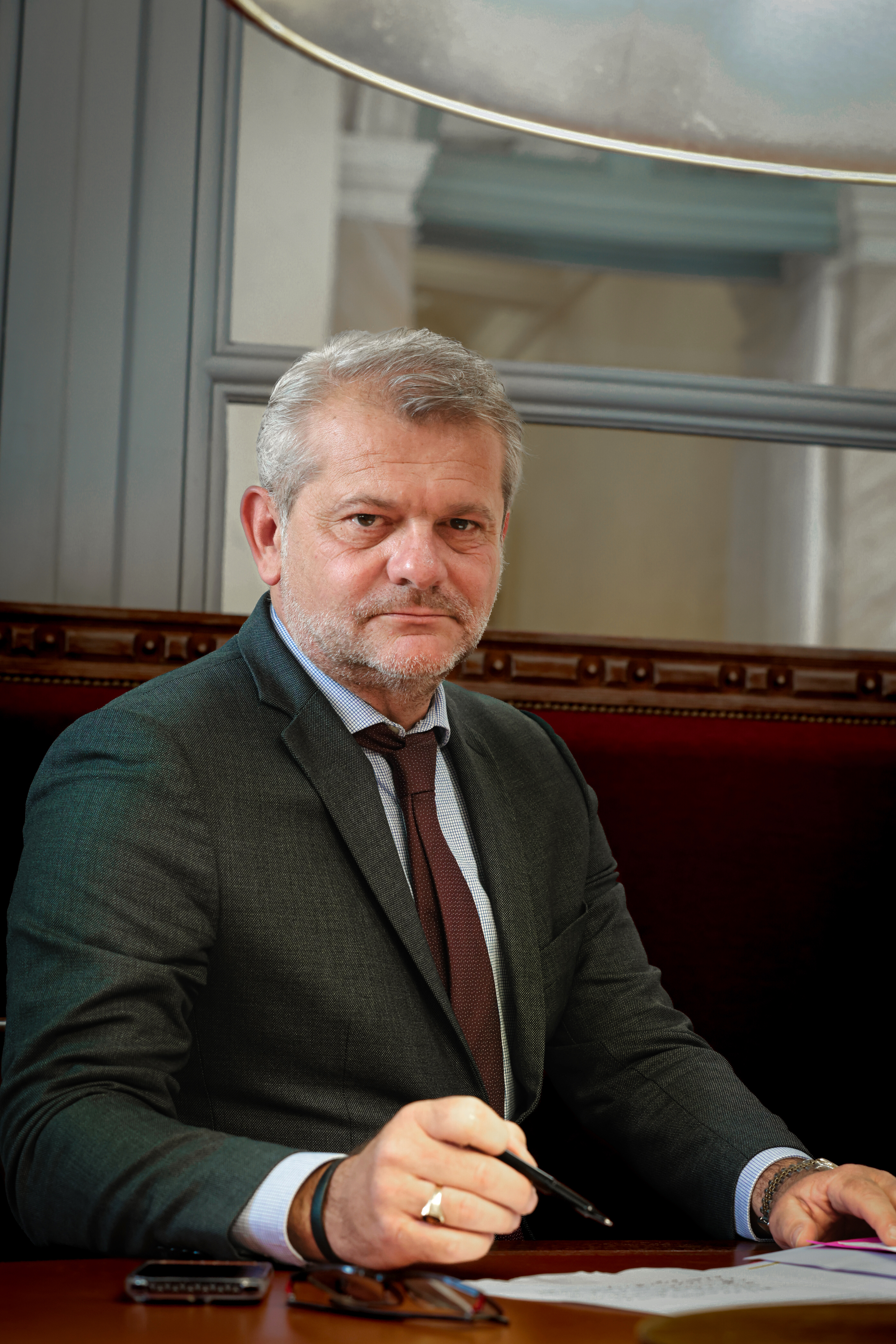
- Philippe Schreck

Member of the National Assembly for Var's 8th constituency
- Incumbent
- Assumed office 22 June 2022
- Preceded by: Fabien Matras

Personal details
- Born: 2 February 1972 (age 54) Verdun, France
- Party: National Rally
- Occupation: Lawyer, politician

Philippe Schreck (born 2 February 1972) is a French lawyer and politician of the National Rally. He has been a deputy in the National Assembly for Var's 8th constituency since 2022.

Schreck trained as a lawyer and worked as an attorney in Draguignan specialising in property law. He also previously served as the president of SC Draguignan football club.

Since 2020 he has been a municipal councilor in Draguignan and was elected RN deputy for the eighth district of Var during the 2022 French legislative election.
