= Fabien Matras =

French politician

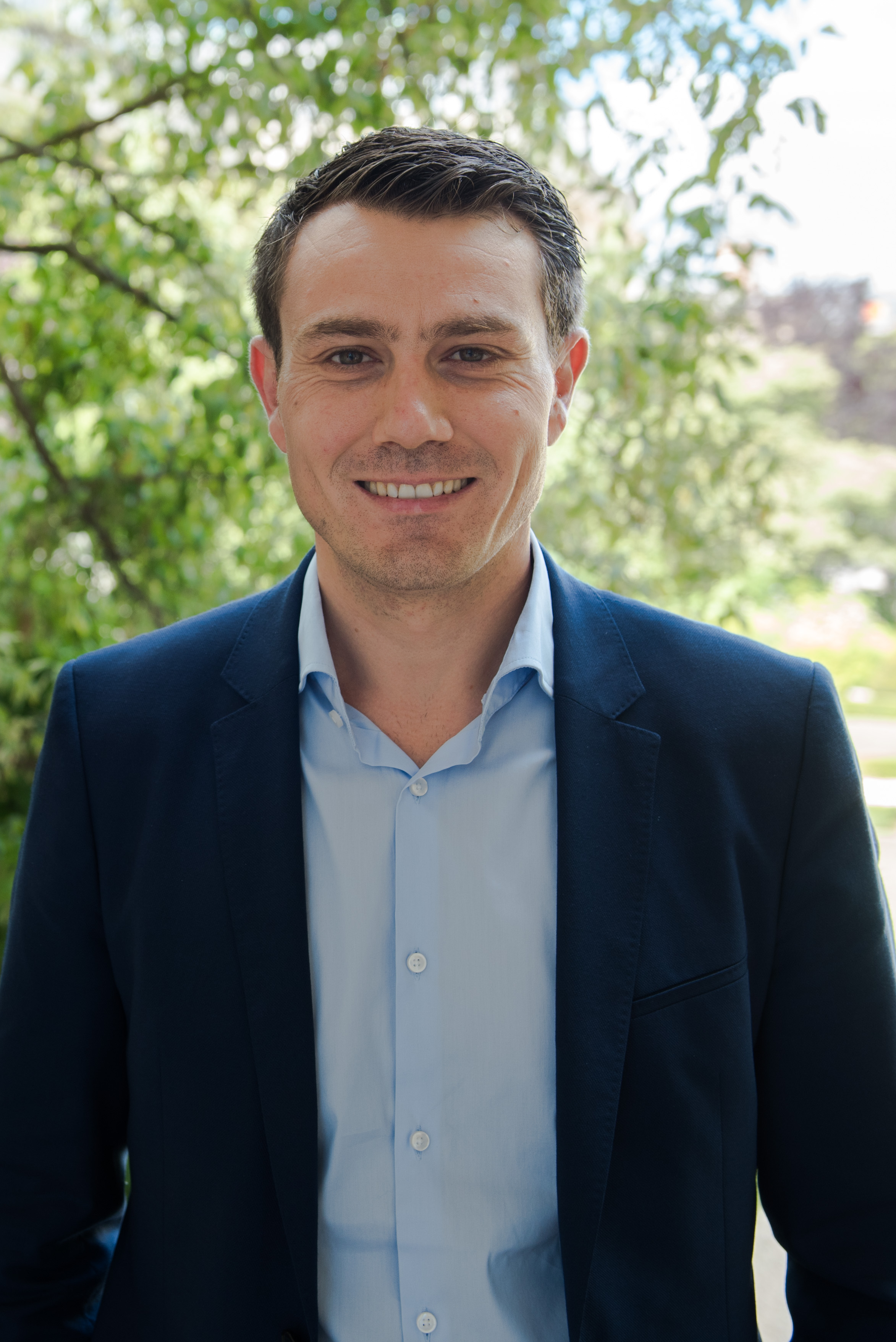

Member of the French National Assembly for Var's 8th constituency
- In office 21 June 2017 – 21 June 2022
- Preceded by: Olivier Audibert Troin
- Succeeded by: Philippe Schreck

Mayor of Flayosc
- Incumbent
- Assumed office 5 April 2014

Personal details
- Born: 12 September 1984 (age 41) Grenoble, France
- Party: En Marche!
- Education: University of Toulon
- Occupation: Law teacher

Fabien Matras (born 12 September 1984) is a French politician, who was a member of the French National Assembly representing Var.

== Biography ==
=== Early life ===
Born into a family of Italian immigrants, he was born in Grenoble on 12 September 1984. Matras completed his law studies from the 1st year Bachelor's degree of the 1st year Master's degree at the Draguignan branch of the Faculty of Law. In June 2012, he obtained the Research Master's degree "Comparative Law of Fundamental Freedoms". Professionally, he is a teacher at the Faculty of Law of Toulon, mainly in Draguignan in Public Law.

=== Political career ===
In 2014, he is elected Mayor of Flayosc.

=== Member of the National Assembly ===
He was elected to the French National Assembly on 18 June 2017, representing the 8th constituency of Var.

In the National Assembly, he sits on the Constitutional Acts, Legislation and General Administration Committee. He is a President of the Information mission on the ethics of public servants and the management of conflicts of interest.

== See also ==
- 2017 French legislative election
