= Romain Baubry =

French politician (born 1989)

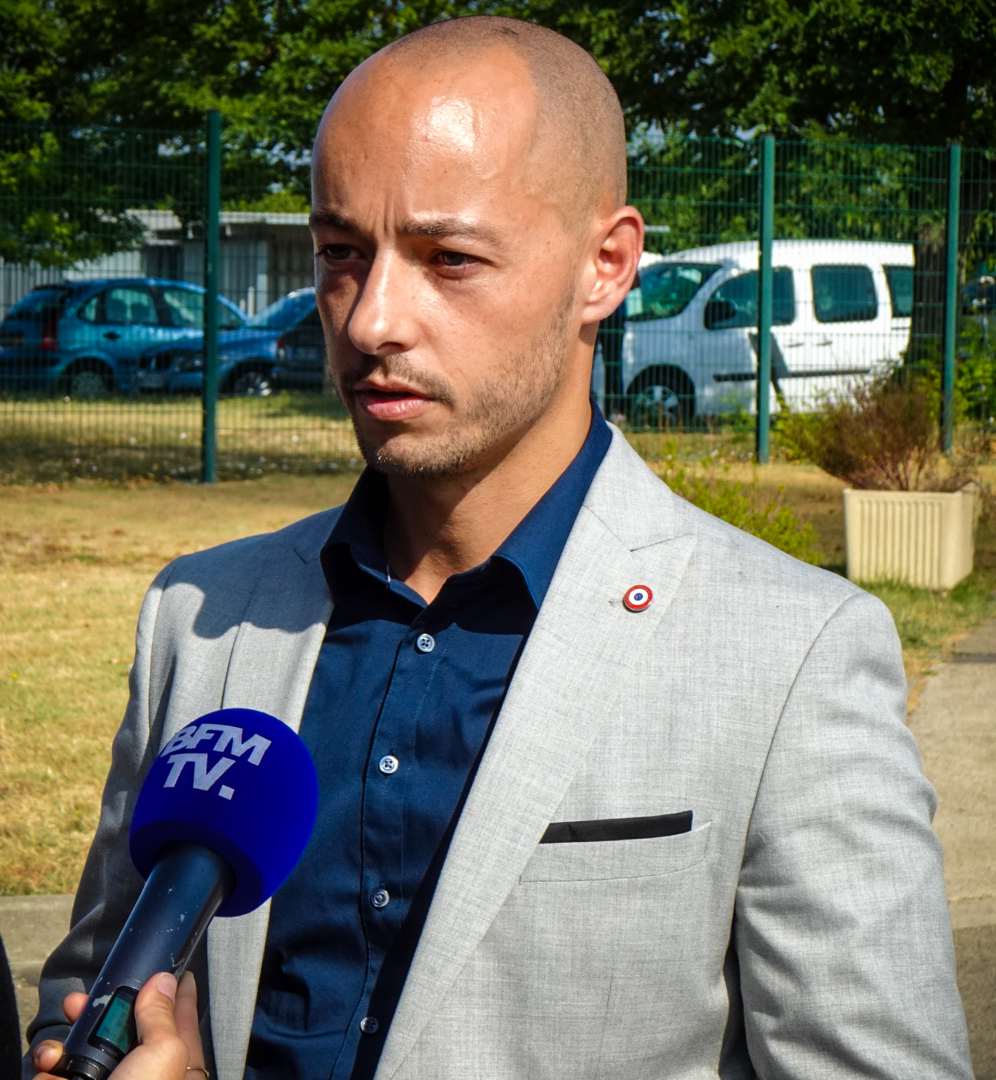
- Baubry in Arles in 2022

Member of the National Assembly for Bouches-du-Rhône's 15th constituency
- Incumbent
- Assumed office 22 June 2022
- Preceded by: Bernard Reynès

Personal details
- Born: 28 January 1989 (age 37) Mont-Saint-Aignan, France
- Party: National Rally
- Occupation: Police officer, politician

Romain Baubry (French pronunciation: [ʁɔmɛ̃ bobʁi]; born 28 January 1989) is a French police officer and politician of the National Rally (RN). In 2022, he was elected as the deputy for the 15th constituency of the Bouches-du-Rhône department.

== Biography ==
Baubry was born in Seine-Maritime and later moved to Bouches-du-Rhône. His parents run a floristry business. Baubry was a volunteer with the National Gendarmerie for two years, then a prison guard for five years before working as an officer of the National Police in Cavaillon, Vaucluse and Nîmes, Gard.

Since 2020, he has been a municipal councillor of Sénas for the National Rally. In the 2021 departmental election, he contested the canton of Salon-de-Provence-1 but was defeated in the second round.

In the 2022 legislative election, Baubry was elected to the National Assembly in the 15th constituency of Bouches-du-Rhône. He defeated Democratic Movement (MoDem) candidate Marie-Laurence Anzalone (who ran under the Ensemble alliance) in the second round with 53.8% of the vote. He has cited national security concerns as one of his reasons for getting involved in politics. In Parliament, he sits on the Committee on Laws.
