= Charente's 3rd constituency =

Constituency of the National Assembly of France

3rd constituency of Charente
- inline Constituency of the National Assembly of France

- The three constituencies of Charente

- Charente in France
- Deputy: Caroline Colombier; RN
- Department: Charente
- Registered voters: 90,886

The 3rd constituency of Charente is a French legislative constituency in the Charente département.

== Deputies ==
Election	Member	Party
1958	Jean Valentin	CNIP
1962	Jean Valentin	SE
1967	Jean Valentin	CD
1968	Michel Alloncle	UDR
1973	Michel Alloncle	UDR
1978	André Soury	PCF
1981	André Soury	PCF
1986	Proportional representation - no election by constituency	
1988	Jérôme Lambert	PS
1993	Henri de Richemont	RPR
1997	Jérôme Lambert	PS
2002	Jérôme Lambert	PS
2007	Jérôme Lambert	PS
2012	Jérôme Lambert	PS
2017	Jérôme Lambert	PS
2022	Caroline Colombier	RN
2024	Caroline Colombier	RN

== Election results ==
=== 2024 ===
Candidate	Party	Alliance	First round			Second round		
Candidate	Party	Alliance	Votes	%	+/–	Votes	%	+/–
Caroline Colombier	RN		25,976	42.95	+19.90	30,110	52.22	+1.98
Virginie Lebraud	PS	NFP	15,653	25.88	+6.40	27,548	47.78	new
Gwenhaël François	RE	ENS	14,829	24.52	+4.09	withdrew		
Dominique Souchaud	ÉAC		2,293	3.79	new			
Adrian Touzé	REC		889	1.47	-1.36			
Patrick Curgali	LO		844	1.40	+0.25			
Votes			60,484	100.00		57,658	100.00	
Valid votes			60,484	95.92	-0.59	57,658	90.81	+3.05
Blank votes			1,465	2.32	+0.10	3,951	6.22	-1.88
Null votes			1,109	1.76	+0.49	1,883	2.97	-1.17
Turnout			63,058	69.55	+17.75	63,492	70.02	+20.17
Abstentions			27,608	30.45	-17.75	27,185	29.98	-20.17
Registered voters			90,666			90,677		
Result			RN HOLD					

=== 2022 ===
Legislative Election 2022: Charente's 3rd constituency
Party	Candidate	Votes	%	±%
RN	Caroline Colombier	10,475	23.05	+9.99
MoDem (Ensemble)	Sylvie Mocoeur	9,286	20.43	-8.11
PS (NUPÉS)	Marie-Pierre Noël	8,861	19.48	-18.94
PS	Jérôme Lambert*	8,142	17.92	N/A
DIV	Laurent Fouillet	2,603	5.73	N/A
LR (UDC)	Pierre Henri Guignard	1,914	4.21	−11.56
REC	Aurore De Clisson	1,284	2.83	N/A
DIV	Francis Lalanne	963	2.12	N/A
Others	N/A	1,928		
Turnout		45,446	51.80	−0.99
2nd round result
RN	Caroline Colombier	19,980	50.24	N/A
MoDem (Ensemble)	Sylvie Mocoeur	19,787	49.76	+9.66
Turnout		39,767	49.85	+2.92
RN gain from PS				

* PS dissident

=== 2017 ===
Candidate	Label	First round		Second round	
Candidate	Label	Votes	%	Votes	%
Madeleine Ngombet-Bitoo	REM	13,247	28.54	14,951	40.10
Jérôme Lambert	PS	9,844	21.21	22,337	59.90
Brigitte Fouré	UDI	7,319	15.77		
Aurélie de Azevedo	FN	6,058	13.05		
Véronique Grégori-Bachelier	FI	4,557	9.82		
Christophe Mauvillain	PCF	2,065	4.45		
Anabelle Sicre	ECO	1,371	2.95		
Annie Bragg	DLF	711	1.53		
Anne Mainguy	EXG	538	1.16		
François Monrousseau	ECO	450	0.97		
Sophie Djaafari	DIV	233	0.50		
Françoise Fize	DVG	21	0.05		
Votes		46,414	100.00	37,288	100.00
Valid votes		46,414	96.73	37,288	87.42
Blank votes		978	2.04	3,074	7.21
Null votes		591	1.23	2,294	5.38
Turnout		47,983	52.79	42,656	46.93
Abstentions		42,917	47.21	48,230	53.07
Registered voters		90,900		90,886	
Source: Ministry of the Interior

=== 2012 ===
Results of the 10 June and 17 June 2012 French legislative election in Charente’s 3rd Constituency
Party	Candidate	Votes	%	±%
PS	Jérôme Lambert	29,706	54.24	
UMP	Jean-Marc de Lustrac	12,373	22.59	
FN	Jean-Pierre Thromas	6,428	11.74	
FG	Sylvain Minbiolle	3,299	6.02	
EELV	Claire Mariot-Durant	1,438	2.63	
DVD	Olivier Gallet	774	1.41	
DVE	François Monroussseau	434	0.79	
Far left	Anne Mainguy	312	0.57	
Majority		17,333	31.65	
Turnout		55,921	60.87	
PS hold		Swing		

=== 2007 ===
Summary of the 10 June and 17 June 2007 French legislative election in Charante’s 3rd Constituency
Candidate	Party		1st round		2nd round	
Candidate	Party		Votes	%	Votes	%
Jérôme Lambert	Socialist Party	PS	19,487	44.18%	27,484	61.56%
Caroline Fombaron	Union for a Popular Movement	UMP	13,158	29.83%	17,163	38.44%
Ioana Vaudin	Democratic Movement	MoDem	3,053	6.92%		
Michelle Mauvillain	Communist	PCF	1,660	3.76%		
René Thromas	Front National	FN	1,429	3.24%		
Madeleine Labie	The Greens	VEC	1,285	2.91%		
Brigitte Moreau	Movement for France	MPF	946	2.14%		
Marie-Thérèse Gerault	Far Left	EXG	933	2.12%		
Agnès Malsacré	Hunting, Fishing, Nature, Traditions	CPNT	748	1.70%		
Anne Mainguy	Far Left	EXG	365	0.83%		
Joël Bouchaud	Miscellaneous Right	DVD	303	0.69%		
Robert Tixier	Presidential Majority	Maj Pres	234	0.53%		
Pascale Protzenko	Independent	DIV	203	0.46%		
Claire Tournier	Far Right	EXD	186	0.42%		
Jean Urroz	Regionalist	REG	123	0.28%		
Total			44,113	100%	44,647	100%
Registered voters			69,148		69,142	
Blank/Void ballots			1,152	2.55%	1,215	2.65%
Turnout			45,265	65.46%	45,862	66.33%
Abstentions			23,883	34.54%	23,280	33.67%
Result					PS HOLD	

=== 2002 ===
Legislative Election 2002: Charente's 3rd constituency
Party	Candidate	Votes	%	±%
PS	Jérôme Lambert	16,995	36.77	
UMP	Marie-France Michaud	9,882	21.38	
UDF	Jean-Pierre Regeon	7,435	16.09	
FN	Sylvie Huguet	3,609	7.81	
PCF	Martial Daganaud	2,215	4.79	
CPNT	Claudette Mallet	1,383	2.99	
DVD	Franck Rougier	1,332	2.88	
LV	Isabelle Nicolas	1,080	2.34	
Others	N/A	2,285		
Turnout		47,617	68.66	
2nd round result
PS	Jérôme Lambert	24,637	54.96	
UMP	Marie-France Michaud	20,191	45.04	
Turnout		46,760	67.44	
PS hold				

=== 1997 ===
Legislative Election 1997: Charente's 3rd constituency
Party	Candidate	Votes	%	±%
PS	Jérôme Lambert	16,070	33.77	
RPR	Henri de Richemont	15,874	33.36	
PCF	Patrick Berthault	6,195	13.02	
FN	Michel Tessier	4,440	9.33	
LV	Yves Manguy	2,840	5.97	
MPF	Bruno Lafenêtre	1,323	2.78	
REG	Jean Urroz	844	1.77	
Turnout		50,825	73.89	
2nd round result
PS	Jérôme Lambert	28,883	56.36	
RPR	Henri de Richemont	22,364	43.64	
Turnout		54,119	78.66	
PS gain from RPR				
