= Justine Benin =

French politician (born 1975)

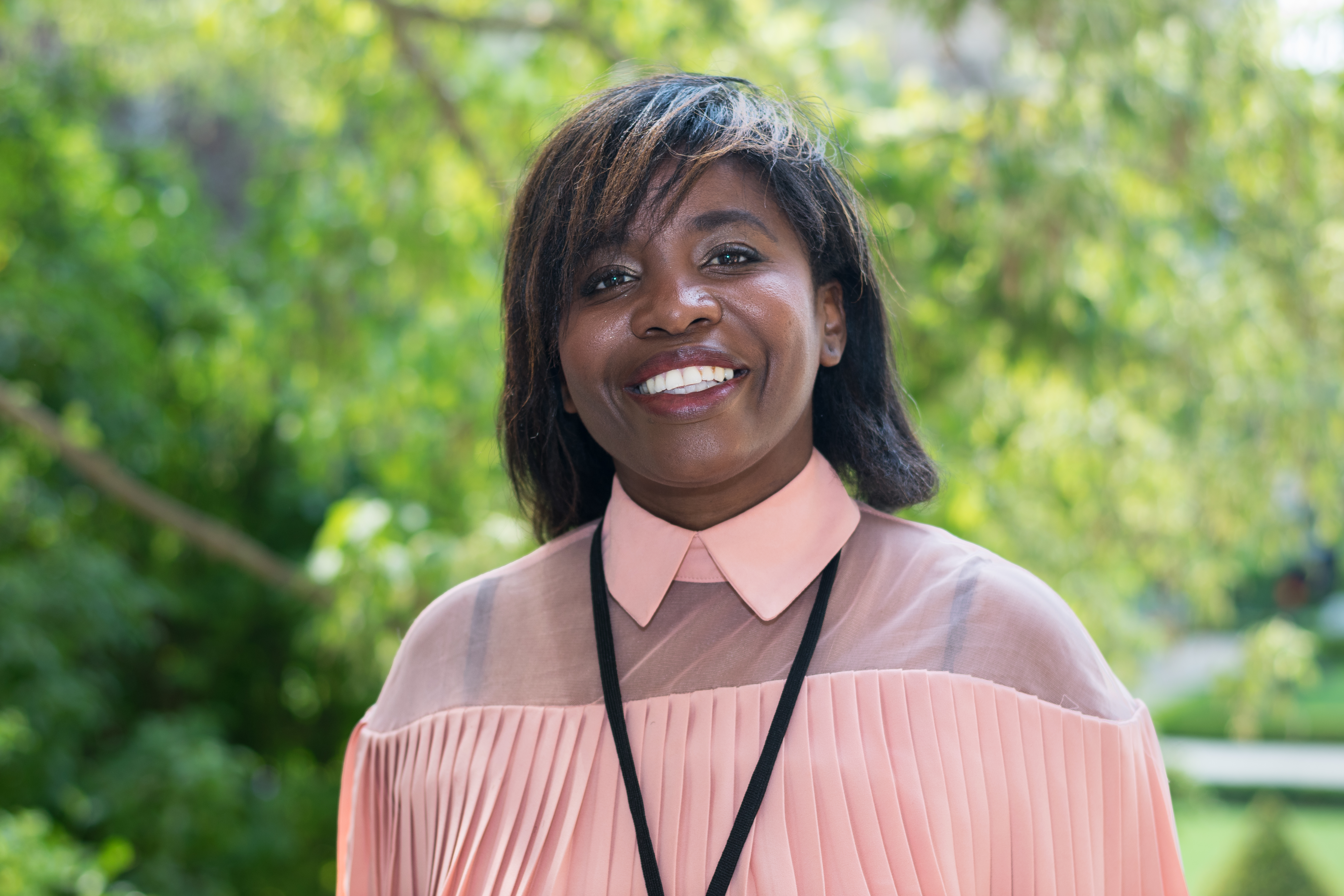
- Justine Benin at the Assembly, June 2017

Secretary of State for the Sea
- In office 20 May 2022 – 4 July 2022
- President: Emmanuel Macron
- Prime Minister: Élisabeth Borne
- Preceded by: Annick Girardin
- Succeeded by: Hervé Berville
- Parliamentary group: DVG, affiliated with MoDEM

Member of the National Assembly for Guadeloupe's 2nd constituency
- In office 20 June 2017 – June 2022
- Preceded by: Gabrielle Louis-Carabin
- Succeeded by: Christian Baptiste

Councillor, Regional Council of Guadeloupe
- In office 5 March 2010 – 13 December 2015
- President: Victorin Lurel

Personal details
- Born: 12 March 1975 (age 51) Les Abymes (Guadeloupe)
- Education: Federal University of Toulouse Midi-Pyrénées

Justine Benin (born 12 March 1975) is a French employment counsellor and politician who briefly served as Secretary of State for the Sea in the government of Prime Minister Élisabeth Borne in 2022. She previously was a deputy in the 15th legislature of the French Fifth Republic for the 2nd constituency of Guadeloupe as part of the Miscellaneous left, affiliated with the Democratic Movement (MoDem).

== Political career ==
Born in Les Abymes, Guadeloupe, Benin made her debut in politics at the municipal elections of 2008 by being elected to the Le Moule council on the list of Gabrielle Louis-Carabin, then a member of UMP. At the 2010 regional elections, she was elected on the list of the socialist winner Victorin Lurel.

The following year, during the cantonal elections she was elected general councillor in the canton of Moule-2, eliminating from the first round the outgoing socialist Christian Couchy. She was re-elected at the 2015 departmental election, after the merger of the townships of the municipality in the new canton of Moule.

On 17 June 2017, Benin was elected as a left-wing deputy for Guadeloupe's 2nd constituency, receiving 64.26% of the votes cast in the 2nd round against the LREM candidate Diana Peran.

In May 2022, Benin was appointed Secretary of State for the Sea in the Borne government. She lost her seat in the first round of the 2022 French legislative election.

== Bibliography ==
- Justine Benin (2017). Ma méthode : l'exercice pratique du mandat local (in French). Éditions Graphica DL. ISBN 978-2-915095-31-9.
