= Minister of the Sea (France) =

Logo of the Minister of the Sea

The Minister of the Sea (French: Ministre de la Mer) was a cabinet member in the Government of France from 1981 to 2017 and from 2020 to 2022. The position has frequently been combined with the positions of Minister of Transport (Ministre des Transports), Minister of Public Works (Ministre des Travaux publics), Minister of Housing (Ministre du Logement), Minister of Tourism (Ministre du Tourisme) and Minister of Territorial Development (Ministre de l'Aménagement du territoire).

Alain Vidalies was Secretary of State for Transport, the Sea and Fisheries (Secrétaire d'État chargé des Transports, de la Mer et de la Pêche) from 2014 to 2017. The post was a junior minister of cabinet rank within the Ministry of Ecology, Sustainable Development and Energy. When Nicolas Hulot took the direction of the ministry in 2017, the office was abolished and replaced by the State Secretariat for the Sea.

The Minister of the Sea was fully reinstalled on its own between July 2020 and May 2022 as Annick Girardin hold the title of Minister of the Sea. After May 2022, it became again a Secretary of State under the direction of the Prime Minister's services.

== Ministers of the Sea (1981–2022) ==
- 4 July 2022 – : Hervé Berville (as Secretary of State for the Sea)
- 20 May 2022 – 4 July 2022: Justine Benin (as Secretary of State for the Sea)
- 6 July 2020 – 20 May 2022 : Annick Girardin
- 16 July 2019 – 6 July 2020 : Élisabeth Borne (as Minister of Ecological Transition)
- 4 September 2018 – 16 July 2019 : François de Rugy (as Minister of Ecological and Solidarity Transition)
- 17 May 2017 – 4 September 2018 : Nicolas Hulot (as Minister of Ecological and Solidarity Transition)
- 25 August 2014 – 10 May 2017 : Alain Vidalies (as Secretary of State for Transport, the Sea and Fisheries)
- 2 April 2014 – 24 August 2014 : Frédéric Cuvillier (as Secretary of State for Transport, the Sea and Fisheries)
- 20 June 2012 – 31 March 2014 : Frédéric Cuvillier (as Minister for Transport, the Sea and Fisheries)
- 16 May 2012 – 18 June 2012 : Frédéric Cuvillier (as Minister for Transport and the Maritime Economy)
- 23 June 2009 – 13 May 2010 : Jean-Louis Borloo (as Minister for Ecology, Energy, Sustainable Development and the Sea)
- 31 May 2005 – 17 May 2007 : Dominique Perben (as Minister for Infrastructure, Transport, Tourism and the Sea)
- 30 March 2004 – 31 May 2005 : François Goulard (as Secretary of State for Transport and the Sea)
- 17 June 2002 – 30 March 2004 : Dominique Bussereau (as Secretary of State for Transport and the Sea)
- 7 May 2002 – 17 June 2002 : Nicole Ameline
- 2 avril 1992 – 28 March 1993 : Charles Josselin
- 15 May 1991 – 31 March 1992 : Jean-Yves Le Drian (as Secretary of State for the Sea)
- 23 June 1988 – 15 May 1991 : Jacques Mellick
- 10 May 1988 – 23 June 1988 : Louis Le Pensec
- 20 March 1986 – 10 May 1988 : Ambroise Guellec
- 23 March 1983 – 20 March 1986 : Guy Lengagne (as Secretary of State responsible for the sea within the Department of Transport)
- 22 May 1981 – 22 March 1983 : Louis Le Pensec
