= Jérôme Lambert =

French politician (born 1957)

Jérôme Lambert (born 7 June 1957 in Vincennes) is a former member of the National Assembly of France. He represented Charente's 3rd constituency across five decades, and was a member of the Socialiste, radical, citoyen et divers gauche.

He lost his seat in the first round of the 2022 French legislative election.
