= Guadeloupe's 2nd constituency =

Constituency of the French Fifth Republic

2nd constituency of Guadeloupe
- inline Constituency of the National Assembly of France

- Deputy: Christian Baptiste; PPDG
- Department: Guadeloupe
- Registered voters: 86,978

The 2nd constituency of Guadeloupe is a French legislative constituency in Guadeloupe, an insular region of France located in the Leeward Islands.

Since 2022, it is represented by Christian Baptiste a Progressive Democratic Party of Guadeloupe deputy.

== Deputies ==
Election	Member	Party
1988	Ernest Moutoussamy	PPDG
1993	Ernest Moutoussamy	PPDG
1997	Ernest Moutoussamy	PPDG
2002	Gabrielle Louis-Carabin	UMP
2007	Gabrielle Louis-Carabin	UMP
2012	Gabrielle Louis-Carabin	DVG
2017	Justine Benin	DVG
2022	Christian Baptiste	PPDG

== Election results ==
=== 2024 ===
Candidate	Party or alliance		First round		Second round	
Candidate	Party or alliance		Votes	%	Votes	%
Christian Baptiste	Miscellaneous left	Progressive Democratic Party of Guadeloupe	10,903	41.33	19,801	72.38
Laurent Petit	National Rally		4,563	17.30	7,557	27.62
Blaise Aldo	Miscellaneous right	Independent	2,291	8.68		
Priscilla Sylvestre	Independent		1,895	7.18		
Ludovic Tolassy	Regionalists	Independent	1,761	6.68		
Steve Salim	Independent	Ecologists	1,685	6.39		
Michel Tola	Miscellaneous left	Independent	1,551	5.88		
Patrick Marcellin Galas	Miscellaneous centre	Independent	698	2.65		
José Ayassami	Independent		324	1.23		
Steeve Cirederf-Rouyar	New Popular Front	Miscellaneous left	226	0.86		
Roseline Chatelot	Independent		182	0.69		
Pamela Pommier	Far-right	Independent	173	0.66		
Raymond Molia	Independent		126	0.48		
Moïse Ayassamy	Miscellaneous left	Independent	2	0.01		
Total			26,380	100.00	27,358	100.00
Valid votes			26,380	93.56	27,358	93.30
Invalid votes			950	3.37	996	3.40
Blank votes			865	3.07	968	3.30
Total votes			28,195	100.00	29,322	100.00
Registered voters/turnout			88,708	31.78	88,702	33.06

=== 2022 ===
Candidate	Label	First round		Second round	
Candidate	Label	Votes	%	Votes	%
Justine Benin	LREM	6,468	31.31	10,915	41.35
Christian Baptiste	PPDG	5,532	26.78	15,484	58.65
Michel Tola	LFI	3,068	14.85		
Michel Girardy-Ramssamy	RN	2,497	12.09		
Ludovic Tolassy	MG	1,152	5.58		
Pauline Couvin	EELV	430	2.08		
Christiane Delannay-Clara	DLF	241	1.17		
Michelle Maxo	EELV	236	1.14		
Nancy Mathias	LC	224	1.08		
Aline Céril	CO	221	1.07		
Gérald Bougrer	DIV	176	0.85		
Paola Plantier	REC	169	0.82		
Steeve Rouyar-Cirederf	GPRG	116	0.56		
Dun Ferus	LR	108	0.52		
Sonia Retour	UDI	21	0.10		
Votes		20,659	100.00	26,399	100.00
Valid votes		20,659	94.21	26,399	93.40
Blank votes		543	2.48	770	2.72
Null votes		726	3.31	1,097	3.88
Turnout		21,928	24.98	28,266	32.20
Abstentions		65,841	75.02	59,511	67.80
Registered voters		87,769		87,769	
Source: Ministry of the Interior

=== 2017 ===
Candidate	Label	First round		Second round	
Candidate	Label	Votes	%	Votes	%
Justine Benin	DVG	4,540	22.58	14,379	64.26
Diana Perran	LREM	3,775	18.78	7,998	35.74
Laurent Bernier	LR	2,815	14.00		
Warren Chingan	PS	2,485	12.36		
Michel Tola	LFI	1,219	6.06		
Sophie Peroumal Sylvanise	DVG	1,059	5.27		
Jacques Kancel	PCF	947	4.71		
Michel Girdary	DVG	634	3.15		
Rony Beral	DIV	534	2.66		
Prévert Mayengo	FN	413	2.05		
Liliane Montout	LR	346	1.72		
Patricia Paule Pompilius	ECO	195	0.97		
Sébastien Gauthier	DVD	181	0.90		
Marlène Valentino	CO	166	0.83		
Henri Luperon	DIV	127	0.63		
Philibert Carvigan	UDI	127	0.63		
Caroll Laug	DVG	122	0.61		
Steeve Rouyar	DIV	81	0.40		
Françoise Graux	DIV	72	0.36		
Sebastien Riglet	DIV	63	0.31		
Jean-Jacob Bicep	APLG	61	0.30		
Marie-Jeanne Quinol	UDI	51	0.25		
Moïse Ayassamy	DVD	47	0.23		
Serge Sercien	EXD	33	0.16		
Gérald Bougrer	DIV	10	0.05		
Leopold Deher-Lesaint	ECO	2	0.01		
Votes		20,105	100.00	22,377	100.00
Valid votes		20,105	92.87	22,377	91.45
Blank votes		704	3.25	945	3.86
Null votes		840	3.88	1,148	4.69
Turnout		21,649	24.89	24,470	28.13
Abstentions		65,332	75.11	62,508	71.87
Registered voters		86,981		86,978	
Source: Ministry of the Interior

=== 2012 ===
2012 legislative election in Guadeloupe's 2nd constituency
Candidate	Party	First round		Second round	
Candidate	Party	Votes	%	Votes	%
Gabrielle Louis-Carabin	DVG	13,853	56.95%	20,347	72.46%
Laurent Bernier	UMP	5,280	21.71%	7,934	28.25%
Cédric Cornet	DVD	2,839	11.67%		
Christian Couchy	PS	884	3.63%		
Moïse Ayassami	DVD	602	2.47%		
Teddy Gabreau	FN	379	1.56%		
Claude Fletcher	CO	199	0.82%		
Christian Carvigan	PCD	172	0.71%		
Tony Sempaire	DVD	116	0.48%		
Valid votes		24,324	95.40%	28,081	94.49%
Spoilt and null votes		1,173	4.60%	1,636	5.51%
Votes cast / turnout		25,497	31.27%	29,717	36.45%
Abstentions		56,029	68.73%	51,813	63.55%
Registered voters		81,526	100.00%	81,530	100.00%

== Sources ==
Official results of French elections from 2002: "Résultats électoraux officiels en France" (in French).
