= Michel Guiniot =

French politician

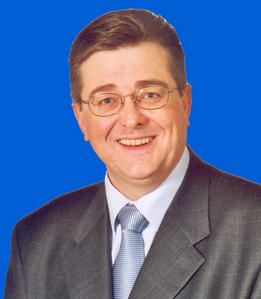

Member of the National Assembly for Oise's 6th constituency
- Incumbent
- Assumed office 19 June 2022
- Preceded by: Carole Bureau-Bonnard

Personal details
- Born: 29 November 1954 (age 71) Chauny, France
- Party: National Rally

Michel Guiniot (born November 29, 1954, in Chauny) is a French businessman and politician of the National Rally.

He has been a member of the National Assembly for Oise's 6th constituency since 2022.

== Biography ==
Guiniot was born in Chauny and comes from a family of established business owners. He moved to Noyon in 1975 and worked as a craftsman before setting up a business. He is the father-in-law of Mylène Troszczynski, a former French Member of the European Parliament.

He has been a member of the National Rally (at the time National Front) since 1988 and stood for the first time in Noyon during the 1989 municipal elections. He was a municipal councilor until 2015. He also worked as a coordinator for Jean-Marie Le Pen by helping to recruit candidates and put together electoral lists for the party. Guiniot was the departmental secretary in Oise of the National Front from 1992 to 2017. In 2012, he was also an advisor to Marine Le Pen during the French presidential election held that year.

During the 2022 French legislative election, Guiniot was elected to the constituency of Oise's 6th.
