= Vienne's 3rd constituency =

Constituency of the National Assembly of France

3rd constituency of Vienne
- inline Constituency of the National Assembly of France

- Constituency in department

- Vienne in France
- Deputy: Pascal Lecamp; MoDem
- Department: Vienne
- Cantons: Availles-Limouzine, Charroux, Chauvigny, Civray, Couhé, Gençay, L'Isle-Jourdain, Lusignan, Lussac-les-Châteaux, Montmorillon, Saint-Savin, La Trimouille. Commune de La Puye.

The 3rd constituency of Vienne is a French legislative constituency in the Vienne département. It is represented by Pascal Lecamp of the MoDem since 2022.

== Deputies ==
Election	Member	Party
1988	Arnaud Lepercq	RPR
1993	Arnaud Lepercq	RPR
1997	Arnaud Lepercq	RPR
2002	Arnaud Lepercq	UMP
2007	Jean-Michel Clément	PS
2012	Jean-Michel Clément	PS
2017	Jean-Michel Clément	LREM
2018	Jean-Michel Clément	PP
2022	Pascal Lecamp	MoDem

== Election results ==
=== 2024 ===
Candidate	Party	Alliance	First round		Second round	
Candidate	Party	Alliance	Votes	%	Votes	%
Pascal Lecamp	MoDEM	Ensemble	14,704	30.18	26,100	54.41
Eric Soulat	RN		19,887	40.82	21,868	45.59
Gisèle Jean	DVG	NFP	13,020	26.73		
Soizic Jouan	LO		688	1.41		
Tatiana Gouverneur	LO	LE-EELV	417	0.86		
Valid votes			48,716	96.15	47,968	94.23
Blank votes			1,182	2.33	2,060	4.05
Null votes			767	1.51	876	1.72
Turnout			50,665	69.96	50,904	70.28
Abstentions			21,754	30.04	21,526	29.72
Registered voters			72,419		72,430	
Result			MoDEM HOLD			

=== 2022 ===
Legislative Election 2022: Vienne's 3rd constituency
Party	Candidate	Votes	%	±%
RN	Eric Soulet	7,697	20.92	+6.24
MoDem (Ensemble)	Pascal Lecamp	7,637	20.75	-19.23
LFI (NUPÉS)	Jason Valente	7,585	20.61	+2.30
DVG	Jean-Michel Clément	4,407	11.98	N/A
DVD	François Bock	3,195	8.68	N/A
LR (UDC)	Léonard Zerbib	2,362	6.42	−6.90
REC	Olivier Lepercq	1,510	4.10	N/A
DVE	Isabelle Barbot	834	2.27	N/A
Others	N/A	1,572	4.27	
Turnout		36,799	51.90	+1.17
2nd round result
MoDem (Ensemble)	Pascal Lecamp	17,496	54.14	-13.69
RN	Eric Soulet	14,823	45.86	+13.69
Turnout		32,319	49.74	+8.82
MoDem gain from LREM				

=== 2017 ===
Legislative Election 2017: Vienne's 3rd constituency
Party	Candidate	Votes	%	±%
LREM	Jean-Michel Clément	15,013	39.98	
FN	Delphine Jumeau	5,512	14.68	
LR	Enguerrand Delannoy	5,004	13.32	
LFI	Marie-José Cellot	4,385	11.68	
DVD	Gérard Herbert	2,822	7.51	
EELV	Florian Séjourné	1,281	3.41	
PCF	Valérie Lafoy	1,208	3.22	
DVG	Thierry Mesmin	1,194	3.18	
Others	N/A	1,136		
Turnout		37,555	50.73	
2nd round result
LREM	Jean-Michel Clément	20,544	67.83	
FN	Delphine Jumeau	9,744	32.17	
Turnout		30,288	40.92	
LREM hold				

=== 2012 ===
Legislative Election 2012: Vienne's 3rd constituency
Party	Candidate	Votes	%	±%
PS	Jean-Michel Clément	20,377	46.65	
UMP	Enguerrand Delannoy	11,810	27.04	
FN	Cécile Perrot	5,249	12.02	
PCF	Samuel Bougrier	2,949	6.75	
EELV	Michel Cheron	1,300	2.98	
Others	N/A	1,992		
Turnout		43,677	58.38	
2nd round result
PS	Jean-Michel Clément	26,333	61.27	
UMP	Enguerrand Delannoy	16,644	38.73	
Turnout		42,977	57.45	
PS hold				

=== 2007 ===
Legislative Election 2007: Vienne's 3rd constituency
Party	Candidate	Votes	%	±%
UMP	Gérard Herbert	16,527	38.63	
PS	Jean-Michel Clément	13,118	30.66	
DVD	André Senecheau	3,667	8.57	
PCF	Michel Brouard	2,677	6.26	
CPNT	Jean-Louis Bretaudeau	1,389	3.25	
LV	Jacques Nicolas	1,242	2.90	
FN	Maxime Labesse	1,081	2.53	
MPF	Brigitte de Fontaines	913	2.13	
Far left	Myriam Rossignol	865	2.02	
Others	N/A	1,301		
Turnout		44,012	64.98	
2nd round result
PS	Jean-Michel Clément	21,604	50.09	
UMP	Gérard Herbert	21,526	49.91	
Turnout		44,532	65.75	
PS gain from UMP				

=== 2002 ===
Legislative Election 2002: Vienne's 3rd constituency
Party	Candidate	Votes	%	±%
UMP	Arnaud Lepercq	21,799	47.36	
PS	Jean-Michel Clément	11,891	25.84	
PCF	Michel Brouard	3,370	7.32	
FN	Brigitte Leroy	2,779	6.04	
CPNT	Jean-Louis Bretaudeau	2,048	4.45	
LV	Georges Stupar	1,149	2.50	
Others	N/A	2,989		
Turnout		47,232	69.65	
2nd round result
UMP	Arnaud Lepercq	24,836	58.25	
PS	Jean-Michel Clément	17,800	41.75	
Turnout		44,141	65.09	
UMP hold				

=== 1997 ===
Legislative Election 1997: Vienne's 3rd constituency
Party	Candidate	Votes	%	±%
RPR	Arnaud Lepercq	17,464	38.56	
PS	Jean-Claude Cubaud	12,371	27.32	
PCF	Jean-Pierre David	5,558	12.27	
FN	Brigitte Leroy	4,137	9.14	
LV	Georges Stupar	2,471	5.46	
DVD	Yves Marie Gueho	2,093	4.62	
GE	Ferréol Saillard	1,192	2.63	
Turnout		48,778	71.53	
2nd round result
RPR	Arnaud Lepercq	24,227	50.37	
PS	Jean-Claude Cubaud	23,871	49.63	
Turnout		50,980	74.77	
RPR hold				
