= Pyrénées-Orientales's 4th constituency =

Constituency of the National Assembly of France

4th constituency of the Pyrénées-Orientales
- inline Constituency of the National Assembly of France

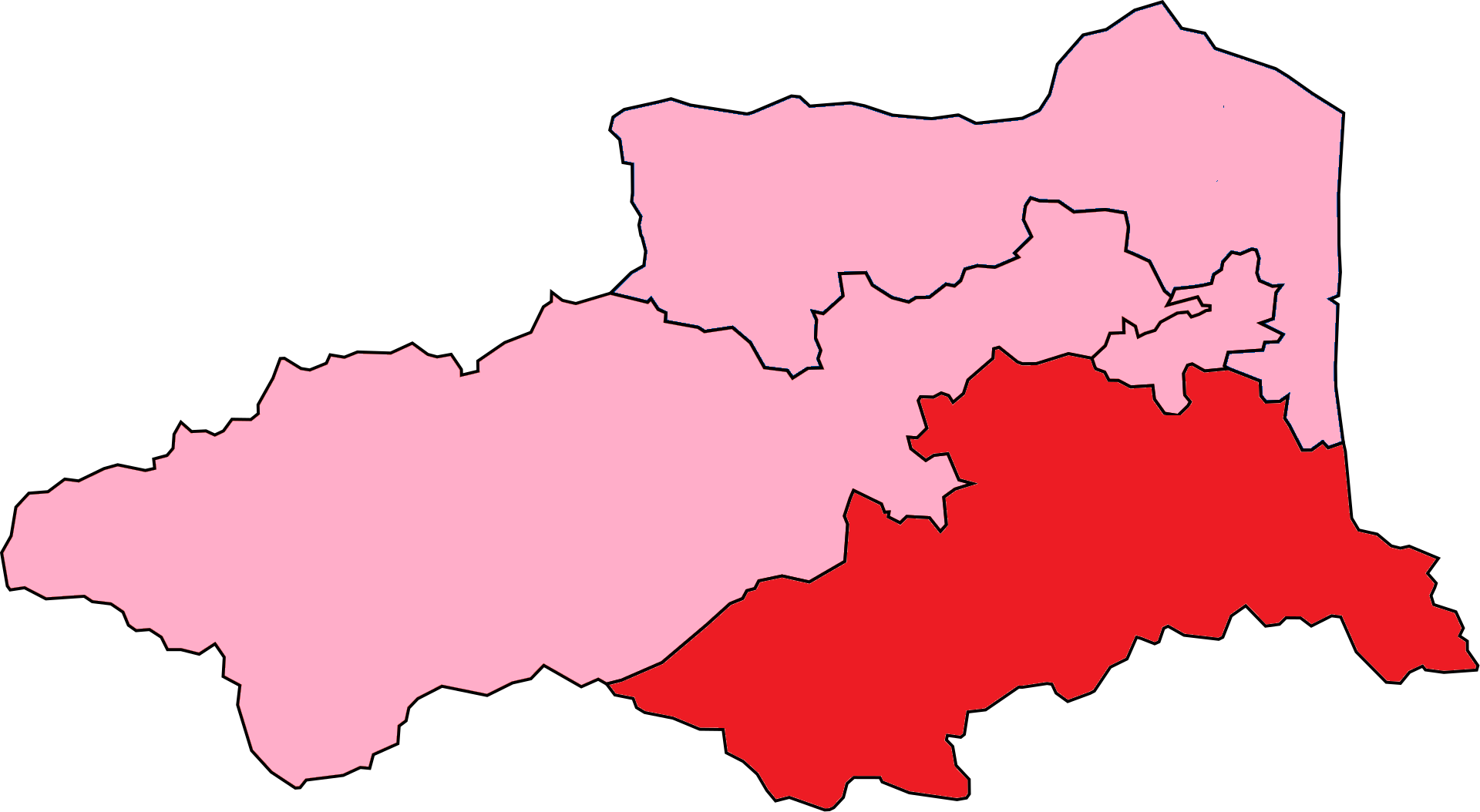
- Pyrénées-Orientales's 3rd Constituency shown within the Pyrénées-Orientales
- Deputy: Michèle Martinez; RN
- Department: Pyrénées-Orientales
- Cantons: Argelès-sur-Mer, Arles-sur-Tech, Céret, Côte-Vermeille, Elne, Prats-de-Mollo-la-Preste, Thuir
- Registered voters: 97099

The 4th constituency of the Pyrénées-Orientales (French: Quatrième circonscription des Pyrénées-Orientales) is a French legislative constituency in the Pyrénées-Orientales département. Like the other 576 French constituencies, it elects one MP using the two-round system, with a run-off if no candidate receives over 50% of the vote in the first round.

== Description ==
The 4th constituency of Pyrénées-Orientales stretches lies in the south east of the department along the border with Spain.

The seat has generally leaned to the left with a sole conservative victory in 2007 being the exception. In common with other seats in Pyrénées-Orientales 2017 saw a strong performance by the National Front.

== Assembly Members ==
Election	Member	Party
1988	Henri Sicre	PS
2007	Jacqueline Irles	UMP
2012	Pierre Aylagas	PS
2017	Sébastien Cazenove	LREM
2022	Michèle Martinez	RN

== Election results ==
=== 2024 ===
Candidate	Party	Alliance	First round		Second round	
Candidate	Party	Alliance	Votes	%	Votes	%
Michèle Martinez	RN		33,159	47.90	38,045	58.14
Julien Baraillé	PS	NFP	17,963	25.95	27,395	41.86
Patricia Nadal	REN	Ensemble	11,454	16.54		
Philippe Romain	LR		3,183	4.60		
Céline Davesa	Ind	REG	1,937	2.80		
Odile Maisonneuve	R!		960	1.39		
Caroline Poupard	LO		575	0.83		
Valid votes			69,231	97.04	65,440	92.94
Blank votes			1,301	1.82	3,900	5.50
Null votes			810	1.14	1,604	2.26
Turnout			71,342	69.44	70,944	69.05
Abstentions			31,400	30.56	31,803	30.95
Registered voters			102,742		102,747	
Result			RN GAIN			

=== 2022 ===
Legislative Election 2022: Pyrénées-Orientales's 4th constituency
Party	Candidate	Votes	%	±%
RN	Michèle Martinez	15,056	30.40	+10.38
LREM (Ensemble)	Sébastien Cazenove	10,799	21.81	-7.19
LFI (NUPÉS)	Jérôme Pous	10,294	20.79	−5.08
PS	Alexandre Reynal*	4,727	9.55	N/A
REC	Sylvie Truchet	2,730	5.51	N/A
LR (UDC)	Bruno Galan	2,396	4.84	−10.53
DIV	Jordi Vera	1,271	2.57	N/A
Others	N/A	2,250	4.54	
Turnout		49,523	49.65	−0.82
2nd round result
RN	Michèle Martinez	24,332	56.28	+14.25
LREM (Ensemble)	Sébastien Cazenove	18,905	43.72	−14.25
Turnout		43,237	47.19	+2.52
RN gain from LREM				

* PS dissident

=== 2017 ===
Results of the 11 June and 18 June 2017 French National Assembly election in Pyrénées-Orientale’s 4th Constituency
Candidate	Party		1st round		2nd round	
Candidate	Party		Votes	%	Votes	%
Sébastien Cazenove	La République En Marche!	LREM	13,831	29.00	22,193	57.97
Stéphane Massanell	National Front	FN	9,546	20.02	16,092	42.03
Jacqueline Irles	The Republicans	LR	7,329	15.37		
Dominique Guérin	La France Insoumise	FI	5,112	10.72		
Nicolas Garcia	Communist Party	PCF	3,645	7.64		
Alexandre Reynal	Socialist Party	PS	3,580	7.51		
Jordi Vera	Regionalist	REG	1,867	3.91		
Franck Huette	Ecologist	ECO	1,152	2.42		
Gisèle Mouragues	Debout la France	DLF	438	0.92		
Daniel Aillaud	Independent	DIV	429	0.90		
Esther Silan	Far Left	EXG	345	0.72		
Carole Percy	Independent	DIV	243	0.51		
Michèle Vadureau Perez	Miscellaneous Right	DVD	174	0.36		
Total			47,691	100%	38,285	100%
Registered voters			97,100		97,099	
Blank/Void ballots			1,316	2.69%	5,086	11.73%
Turnout			49,007	50.47%	43,371	44.67%
Abstentions			48,093	49.53%	53,728	55.33%
Result					REM GAIN FROM PS	

=== 2012 ===
Results of the 10 June and 17 June 2012 French National Assembly election in Pyrénées-Orientale’s 4th Constituency
Candidate	Party		1st round		2nd round	
Candidate	Party		Votes	%	Votes	%
Pierre Aylagas	Socialist Party	PS	20,457	35.98	30,005	55.42
Jacqueline Irles	Union for a Presidential Majority	UMP	15,446	27.16	24,137	44.58
Marie-Thérèse Costa-Fesenbeck	National Front	FN	10,437	18.35		
Nicolas Garcia	Left Front	FG	7,135	12.55		
Bruno Rouane	Europe Ecology – The Greens	EELV	1,445	2.54		
Yves Castanet	Ecologist	ECO	522	0.92		
Jean-Michel Serve	Miscellaneous Right	DVD	344	0.60		
Carol Malortigue	Ecologist	ECO	297	0.52		
Monique Jaulin	Ecologist	ECO	265	0.47		
Jean Boucher	Far Left	EXG	203	0.36		
Esther Silan	Far Left	EXG	196	0.34		
Natacha Bordez	Other	AUT	115	0.20		
Total			56,862	100%	54,142	100%
Registered voters			92,344		92,337	
Blank/Void ballots			998	1.72%	2,858	5.01%
Turnout			57,860	62.66%	57,000	61.73%
Abstentions			34,484	37.34%	35,337	38.27%
Result					PS GAIN FROM UMP	

=== 2007 ===
Results of the 10 June and 17 June 2007 French National Assembly election in Pyrénées-Orientale’s 4th Constituency
Candidate	Party		1st round		2nd round	
Candidate	Party		Votes	%	Votes	%
Jacqueline Irles	Union for a Popular Movement	UMP	21,124	37.59	28,070	50.25
Pierre Aylagas	Miscellaneous Left	DVG	10,072	17.92	27,790	49.75
Olivier Ferrand	Socialist Party	PS	8,567	15.25		
Nicolas Garcia	Communist Party	PCF	5,323	9.47		
Yves Porteix	UDF-Democratic Movement	UDF-MoDem	3,010	5.36		
Marie-Therese Costa-Fesenbeck	National Front	FN	2,566	4.57		
Myriam Granat	Miscellaneous Right	DVD	1,245	2.22		
Franck Huette	The Greens	LV	907	1.61		
Yannick Fissier	Far Left	EXG	833	1.48		
Nicole Puigbo	Hunting, Fishing, Nature and Traditions	CPNT	636	1.13		
Françoise Tibau	Regionalist	REG	543	0.97		
Jacques Cros	Ecologist	ECO	474	0.84		
Jacques Menechal	Movement for France	MPF	358	0.64		
Maria Hernandez	Independent	DIV	279	0.50		
Esther Silan	Far Left	EXG	254	0.45		
Total			56,191	100%	55,860	100%
Registered voters			87,687		87,370	
Blank/Void ballots			1,053	1.84%	2,400	4.12%
Turnout			57,244	65.28%	58,260	66.68%
Abstentions			30,443	34.72%	29,110	33.32%
Result					UMP GAIN FROM PS	

=== 2002 ===
Results of the 9 June and 16 June 2002 French National Assembly election in Pyrénées-Orientale’s 4th Constituency
Candidate	Party		1st round		2nd round	
Candidate	Party		Votes	%	Votes	%
Henri Sicre	Socialist Party	PS	16,182	31.09	24,921	51.58
Myriam Granat	Union for a Presidential Majority	UMP	14,416	27.69	23,392	48.42
Edouard Fesenbeck	National Front	FN	8,483	16.30		
Nicolas Garcia	Communist Party	PCF	4,563	8.77		
Catherine Delhoste	Hunting, Fishing, Nature and Traditions	CPNT	1,369	2.63		
Annick Duval	The Greens	LV	1,308	2.51		
Virginie Barre	Regionalist	REG	1,001	1.92		
Sebastine Lefevre	Revolutionary Communist League	LCR	785	1.51		
Chantal Decosse	Republican Pole	PR	764	1.47		
Christiane Bruneau	Movement for France	MPF	754	1.45		
Annette Delcroix	Independent	DIV	594	1.14		
Jose Marin	National Republican Movement	MNR	546	1.05		
J. Marie Benito	Workers' Struggle	LO	541	1.04		
CANDIDATE	Edwige Pia	ECO	496	0.95		
Martine Lebrun	Ecologist	ECO	192	0.37		
Christian Joubert	Independent	DIV	60	0.12		
Total			52,054	100%	48,313	100%
Registered voters			80,515		80,513	
Blank/Void ballots			1,439	2.69%	3,107	6.04%
Turnout			53,493	66.44%	51,420	63.87%
Abstentions			27,022	33.56%	29,093	36.13%
Result					PS HOLD	
