= Michèle Martinez =

French politician

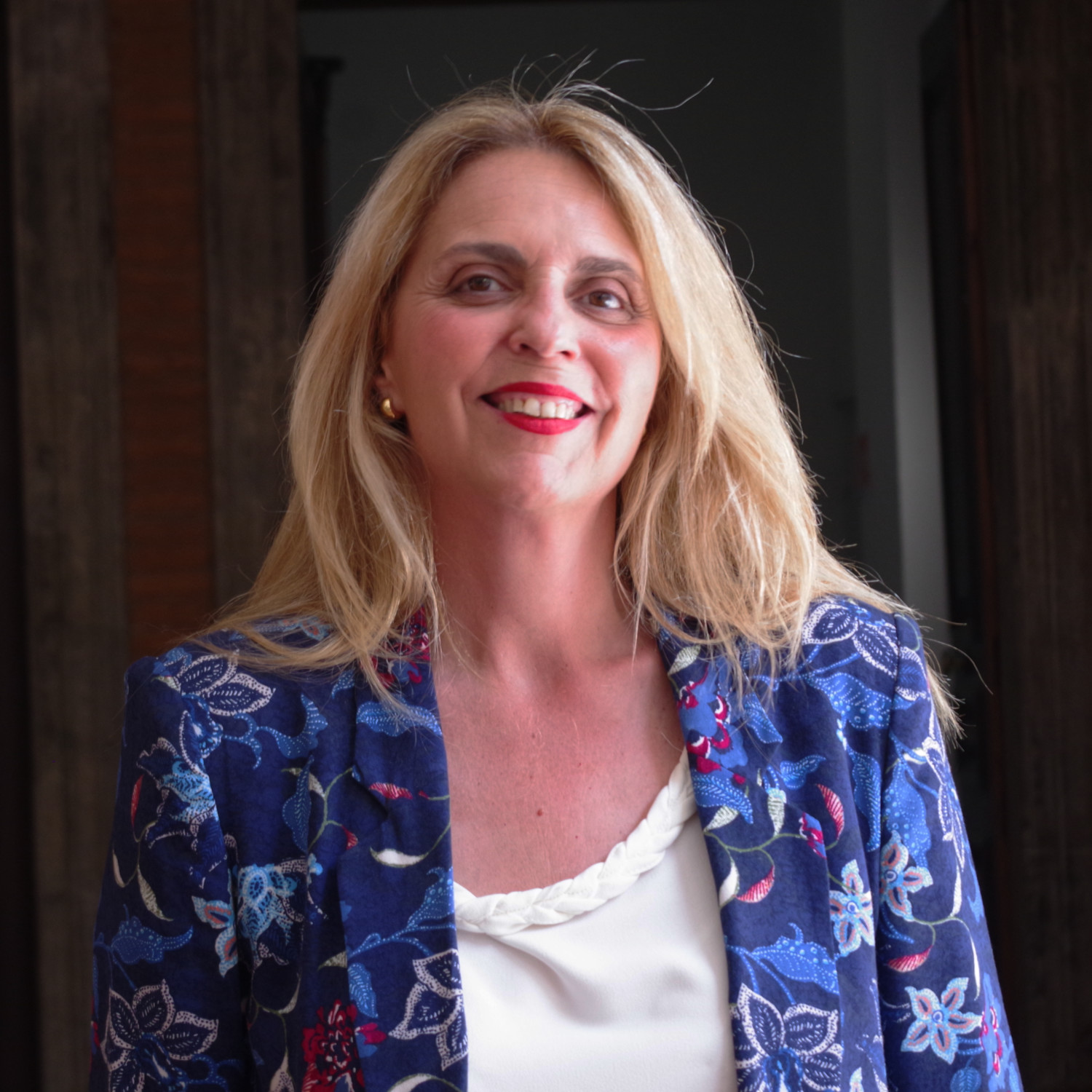

Member of the National Assembly for Pyrénées-Orientales's 4th constituency
- Incumbent
- Assumed office 22 June 2022
- Preceded by: Sébastien Cazenove

Personal details
- Born: 6 June 1968 (age 57) Perpignan, France
- Party: National Rally

Michèle Martinez (born 6 June 1968) is a French politician from National Rally (RN) who has represented the 4th constituency of Pyrénées-Orientales in the National Assembly since 2022.

== See also ==
- List of deputies of the 16th National Assembly of France
