= Var's 8th constituency =

Constituency of the National Assembly of France

8th constituency of Var
- inline Constituency of the National Assembly of France

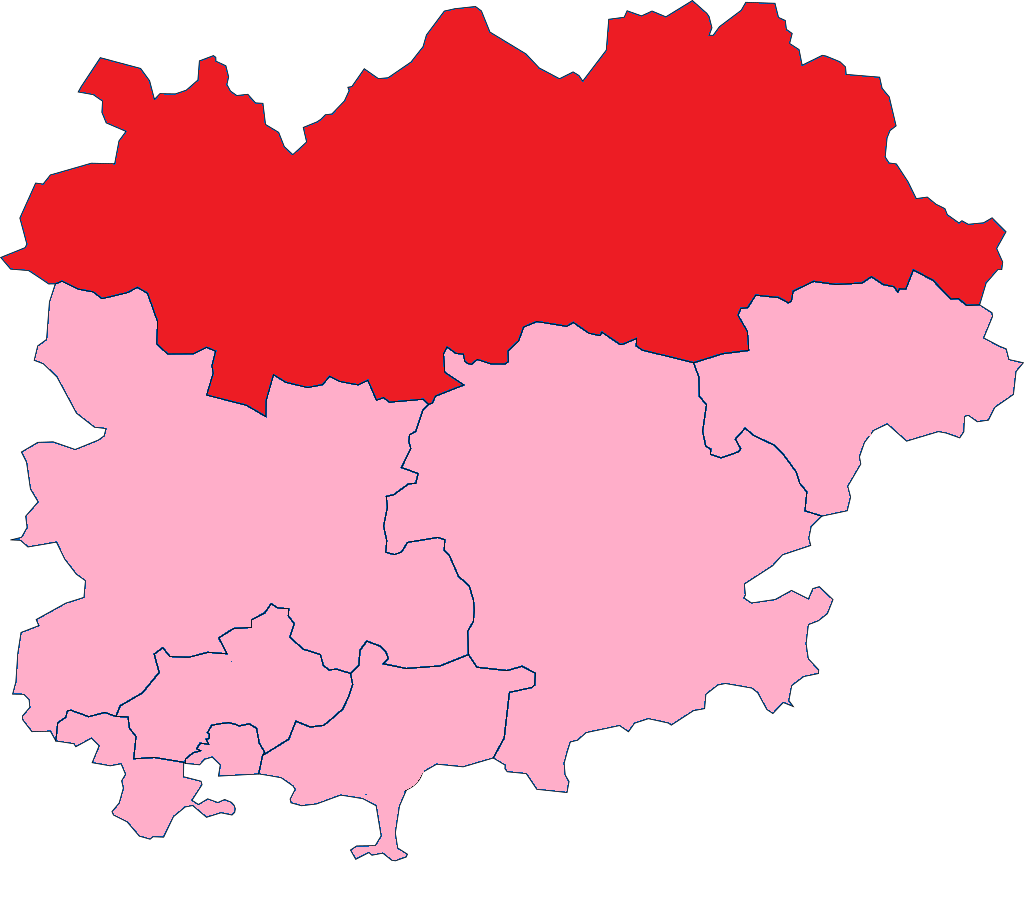
- Var's 8th Constituency shown within the Var
- Deputy: Philippe Schreck; RN
- Department: Var
- Cantons: Aups, Barjols, Callas, Comps-sur-Artuby, Cotignac, Draguignan, Fayence, Rians, Salernes, Tavernes
- Registered voters: 104,360

The 8th constituency of the Var (French: Huitième circonscription du Var) is a French legislative constituency in the Var département. Like the other 576 French constituencies, it elects one MP using the two-round system, with a run-off if no candidate receives over 50% of the vote in the first round.

== Description ==
The 8th constituency of the Var covers the north of the department, it was created as a result of the 2010 redistricting of French legislative constituencies.

At the 2017 election the incumbent mainstream conservative The Republicans deputy came third in the first round behind both the Emmanuel Macron's En Marche! and the far right National Front.

== Assembly Members ==
Election	Member	Party
2012	Olivier Audibert-Troin	UMP
2017	Fabien Matras	LREM
2022	Philippe Schreck	RN

== Election results ==
=== 2024 ===
Legislative Election 2024: Var's 8th constituency
Party	Candidate	Votes	%	±%
DIV	Francis Combe	0	0.00	n/a
LO	Ludovic Martin	915	1.27	n/a
RE (Ensemble)	Rayann Mouslim	11,368	15.84	−9.67
RN	Philippe Schreck	38,433	53.55	+22.89
LR	Frank Panizzi	6,639	9.25	+3.83
PS (NFP)	Sarah Breffy	14,420	20.09	n/a
Turnout		71,775	97.06	+49.98
Registered electors		110,139		
RN hold				

=== 2022 ===
Legislative Election 2022: Var's 8th constituency
Party	Candidate	Votes	%	±%
RN	Philippe Schreck	15,474	30.66	+6.79
LREM (Ensemble)	Fabien Matras	12,876	25.51	-7.10
LFI (NUPÉS)	Catherine Jouanneau	9,484	18.79	+4.69
REC	Vanessa Lucido	4,657	9.23	N/A
LR (UDC)	Guillaume Jublot	2,735	5.42	−17.89
DVE	Claudine Razeau	1,294	2.56	N/A
LMR	Michel Rezk	1,100	2.18	N/A
Others	N/A	2,855	5.66	
Turnout		50,475	47.08	−1.74
2nd round result
RN	Philippe Schreck	25,576	54.93	+12.64
LREM (Ensemble)	Fabien Matras	20,988	45.07	−12.64
Turnout		46,564	45.75	+5.55
RN gain from LREM				

=== 2017 ===
Legislative Election 2017: Var's 8th constituency
Party	Candidate	Votes	%	±%
LREM	Fabien Matras	16,619	32.61	
FN	Pierre Jugy	12,161	23.87	
LR	Olivier Audibert-Troin	11,879	23.31	
LFI	Patricia Massis-Callet	4,989	9.79	
EELV	Bruno Delport	1,374	2.70	
DVD	Clémence Razeau	1,072	2.10	
Others	N/A	2,862		
Turnout		50,956	48.82	
2nd round result
LREM	Fabien Matras	24,209	57.71	
FN	Pierre Jugy	17,743	42.29	
Turnout		41,952	40.20	
LREM gain from LR				

=== 2012 ===
Legislative Election 2012: Var's 8th constituency
Party	Candidate	Votes	%	±%
UMP	Olivier Audibert-Troin	18,257	30.76	
PS	Bernard Clap	16,583	27.94	
FN	Geneviève Blanc	13,813	23.27	
DVD	Max Piselli	3,194	5.38	
FG	Joëlle Mecagni	2,789	4.70	
DIV	Pierre Jugy	2,089	3.52	
Others	N/A	2,635		
Turnout		59,360	59.44	
2nd round result
UMP	Olivier Audibert-Troin	24,125	40.53	
PS	Bernard Clap	22,030	37.01	
FN	Geneviève Blanc	13,363	22.45	
Turnout		59,518	59.61	
UMP win (new seat)				
