= Bouches-du-Rhône's 15th constituency =

Constituency of the National Assembly of France

15th constituency of Bouches-du-Rhône
- inline Constituency of the National Assembly of France

- Constituency in Bouches-du-Rhône Department (white area is the Étang de Berre lagoon)

- Bouches-du-Rhône in France
- Deputy: Romain Baubry; RN
- Department: Bouches-du-Rhône

The 15th constituency of Bouches-du-Rhône is a French legislative constituency in Bouches-du-Rhône.

== Deputies ==
Election	Member	Party
1997	Léon Vachet	UMP
2002	Léon Vachet	UMP
2007	Bernard Reynès	DVD
2012	Bernard Reynès	UMP
2017	Bernard Reynès	LR
2022	Romain Baubry	RN
2024	Romain Baubry	RN

== Elections ==
=== 2024 ===
Candidate	Party	Alliance	First round			Second round		
Candidate	Party	Alliance	Votes	%	+/–	Votes	%	+/–
Romain Baubry	RN		37,493	49.48	+19.96	43,745	65.18	+11.33
Wassila Aïdarous	LFI	NFP	15,314	20.21	+1.42	23,368	34.82	new
Solange Ponchon	RE	Ensemble	12,202	16.10	-6.06			
Stéphane Hermelin	LR	UDC	8,272	10.92	-3.50			
Martine Elesikian	REC		1,414	1.87	-4.31			
Anne Testut	LO		617	0.81	+0.13			
Christophe Ptak	DIV		457	0.60	new			
Votes			75,769	100.00		67,113	100.00	
Valid votes			75,769	96.98	-1.05	67,113	87.86	-3.88
Blank votes			1,726	2.21	+0.79	7,270	9.52	+3.59
Null votes			634	0.81	+0.26	2,007	2.63	+0.30
Turnout			78,129	70.57	+22.21	76,390	68.99	+21.50
Abstentions			32,577	29.43	-22.21	34,335	31.01	-21.50
Registered voters			110,706			110,725		
Result			RN HOLD					

=== 2022 ===
Legislative Election 2022: Bouches-du-Rhône's 15th constituency
Party	Candidate	Votes	%	±%
RN	Romain Baubry	15,296	29.52	+8.17
MoDem	Mari-Laurence Anzalone	11,482	22.16	−8.59
LFI (NUPÉS)	Michèle Jung	9,734	18.79	+3.16
LR (UDC)	Bernard Reynes	7,470	14.42	−11.60
REC	Audrey Marchand	3,203	6.18	N/A
DVE	Nicolas Lapeyre	1,915	3.70	N/A
Others	N/A	2,716		
Turnout		52,858	48.36	−2.15
2nd round result
RN	Romain Baubry	25,640	53.85	N/A
MoDem (Ensemble)	Mari-Laurence Anzalone	21,975	46.15	+2.64
Turnout		47,615	47.49	+2.05
RN gain from LR				

=== 2017 ===
Candidate	Label	First round		Second round	
Candidate	Label	Votes	%	Votes	%
Nathalie Farro	REM	15,941	30.75	18,675	43.51
Bernard Reynès	LR	13,488	26.02	24,242	56.49
Jean-Alexandre Mousset-Seisson	FN	11,068	21.35		
Michèle Jung	FI	5,448	10.51		
Hélène Haensler	ECO	1,711	3.30		
Cécile Moll	ECO	1,277	2.46		
Florence Castanet	PCF	944	1.82		
Lucas Garcia-Mateo	DLF	838	1.62		
Jean-Marc Fortané	DIV	618	1.19		
Denise Tabaracci	DIV	259	0.50		
Noëlle Lagrange	EXG	245	0.47		
Votes		51,837	100.00	42,917	100.00
Valid votes		51,837	97.93	42,917	90.03
Blank votes		740	1.40	3,106	6.52
Null votes		354	0.67	1,648	3.46
Turnout		52,931	50.51	47,671	45.44
Abstentions		51,860	49.49	57,228	54.56
Registered voters		104,791		104,899	
Source: Ministry of the Interior

=== 2012 ===
Summary of the 10 June and 17 June 2012 French legislative election in Bouches-du-Rhône’s 15th Constituency
Candidate	Party		1st round		2nd round	
Candidate	Party		Votes	%	Votes	%
Bernard Reynès	Union for a Popular Movement	UMP	20,954	35.46%	24,812	41.60%
Nicette Aubert	Miscellaneous Left	DVG	16,744	28.34%	21,434	35.93%
Olivia Ponsdesserre	Front National	FN	14,740	24.95%	13,404	22.47%
Stella Apeddu	Left Front	FG	3,117	5.28%		
Stanislas Makowka	Ecologist	ECO	1,046	1.77%		
Didier Maurin		CEN	962	1.63%		
Marc-Antoine Seymard	Far Right	EXD	446	0.75%		
Jérôme Presti	Other	AUT	330	0.56%		
Sylvain Bourgin	Miscellaneous Right	DVD	309	0.52%		
Franck Moulet	Far Left	EXG	235	0.40%		
Michel Pozzetto	Far Left	EXG	206	0.35%		
Total			59,089	100%	59,650	100%
Registered voters			98,301		98,288	
Blank/Void ballots			781	1.30%	802	1.33%
Turnout			59,870	60.90%	60,452	61.50%
Abstentions			38,431	39.10%	37,836	38.50%
Result					UMP GAIN FROM DVD	

=== 2007 ===
Summary of the 10 June and 17 June 2007 French legislative election in Bouches-du-Rhône’s 15th Constituency
Candidate	Party		1st round		2nd round	
Candidate	Party		Votes	%	Votes	%
Bernard Reynès	Miscellaneous Right	DVD	16,658	27.17%	26,794	61.65%
Léon Vachet	Union for a Popular Movement	UMP	16,524	26.96%	16,671	38.35%
Jacky Gerard	Socialist Party	PS	10,965	17.89%		
Caroline Reyre	Front National	FN	4,023	6.56%		
Françoise Jupiter	Democratic Movement	MoDem	3,434	5.60%		
Jacques Rousset	Communist	PCF	2,938	4.79%		
Audrey Machart	Far Left	EXG	1,623	2.65%		
David Gourbeault	The Greens	VEC	1,387	2.26%		
Francis Maurin	Hunting, Fishing, Nature, Traditions	CPNT	1,145	1.87%		
Pierre Vidal	Ecologist	ECO	915	1.49%		
Michel Pozzetto	Far Left	EXG	454	0.74%		
Marc-Antoine Seymard	Far Right	EXD	441	0.72%		
Jocelyne Gayvallet	Independent	DIV	408	0.67%		
Mireille Barthelemy	Movement for France	MPF	386	0.63%		
Elvire Debutte	Far Left	EXG	0	0.00%		
Total			61,301	100%	43,465	100%
Registered voters			100,081		100,084	
Blank/Void ballots			1,236	1.98%	8,782	16.81%
Turnout			62,537	62.49%	52,247	52.20%
Abstentions			37,544	37.51%	47,837	47.80%
Result					DVD GAIN	

=== 2002 ===
Legislative Election 2002: Bouches-du-Rhône's 15th constituency
Party	Candidate	Votes	%	±%
UMP	Leon Vachet	18,948	32.38	
PS	Herve Cherubini	12,894	22.04	
FN	Jeanne Naud	10,880	18.59	
DVD	Maurice Bres	2,763	4.72	
MPF	Yves Picarda	2,535	4.33	
PCF	Helene Dugier	2,229	3.81	
CPNT	Marie-Pierre Daillan	1,563	2.67	
MNR	Marie-Antoine Seymard	1,356	2.32	
Others	N/A	5,344		
Turnout		59,810	66.43	
2nd round result
UMP	Leon Vachet	28,936	58.31	
PS	Herve Cherubini	20,691	41.69	
Turnout		53,564	59.50	
UMP hold				

=== 1997 ===
Legislative Election 1997: Bouches-du-Rhône's 15th constituency
Party	Candidate	Votes	%	±%
RPR	Léon Vachet	15,111	28.19	
FN	Bernard Meslans	13,186	24.60	
PS	Hervé Cherubini	12,447	23.22	
PCF	Georges Jullien	5,811	10.84	
LV	Erik Bonnaud	2,204	4.11	
DVD	Yves Picarda	2,028	3.78	
GE	Patrick Oddoz	1,351	2.52	
Others	N/A	1,472		
Turnout		56,415	70.37	
2nd round result
RPR	Léon Vachet	24,390	41.61	
PS	Hervé Cherubini	22,810	38.92	
FN	Bernard Meslans	11,413	19.47	
Turnout		60,880	75.95	
RPR hold				
