= Ernest Moutoussamy =

Guadeloupean politician

Personal details
- Born: 7 November 1941 (age 84) Guadeloupe
- Citizenship: French

Ernest Moutoussamy, born 7 November 1941 at Saint-François (Guadeloupe), is a French politician from a family of Indian origin with ancestral roots from the Indian states of Tamil Nadu and Puducherry.

== Political career ==
The literature teacher was elected to the Communist Party of Guadeloupe (PCG) in 1981, and re-elected in 1986 and the French legislative elections of 1988. In 1991, he left in office to establish the PCR with other dissidents, remaining member of the Democratic Progressive Party of Guadeloupe (PPDG) for which he was elected in 1993 and the French legislative elections of 1997. In 2002 and 2007, he was defeated by Gabrielle Louis-Carabin (UMP). Ernest Moutoussamy was also mayor of Saint-François from 1989 to 2008 and was Vice President of Regional Council of Guadeloupe. In the 1994 European elections in France, he was the head of a list of the Rally of Outremer.

== Publications ==
=== Essays and Studies ===
- Guadeloupe – The communist movement and its members under the Fourth Republic, L'Harmattan, 1986, ISBN 2-85802-645-9
- Guadeloupe and its Indianness, Caribbean Publishing Collection bias, 1987, ISBN 2-87679-008-4
- DOM-TOM geopolitical issue, economically and strategically, L'Harmattan, 1988, ISBN 2-7384-0070-1
- A danger to the overseas territories: the integration to the European market in 1992, L'Harmattan, 1988, ISBN 2-7384-0173-2
- Aimé Cesaire, a member of the National Assembly 1945–1993, L'Harmattan, 1993, ISBN 2-7384-2255-1
- The overseas under the presidency of François Mitterrand, L'Harmattan, 1996, ISBN 2-7384-4301-X
- Inventing employment overseas, L'Harmattan, 1997, ISBN 2-7384-5160-8
- Members of French India in the National Assembly under the Fourth Republic, L'Harmattan, 2003, ISBN 2-7475-4020-0 (overview)
- Signification des noms indiens de Guadeloupe, (Meaning of the Indian names of Guadeloupe), L'Harmattan, 2009, ISBN 978-2-296-07728-7
- Inde-Guadeloupe : Hommage à la mémoire, (India-Guadeloupe: Tribute to memory), Éditions Jasor, 2016, ISBN 979-1090675537, OCLC 1015317793

=== Poetry ===
- Scars, Caribbean Publishing, Presence African Book, 1985
- In search of India lost, L'Harmattan, 2004, ISBN 2-7475-5943-2
- Islands, kisses the earth god, L'Harmattan, 2006, ISBN 2-296-00054-1

=== Novels ===
- He cries in my country, Desormeaux, 1979
- Aurore, L'Harmattan, 1987
- Chacha and Sosso, L'Harmattan, 1994
- À la lumière de l'alphabet: ou le combat des enfants des champs de canne à sucre, (In the light of the alphabet: or the fight of the children of the sugar cane fields), L'Harmattan, 2016, ISBN 978-2343081113, OCLC 954434777
