= Christian Baptiste =

French politician

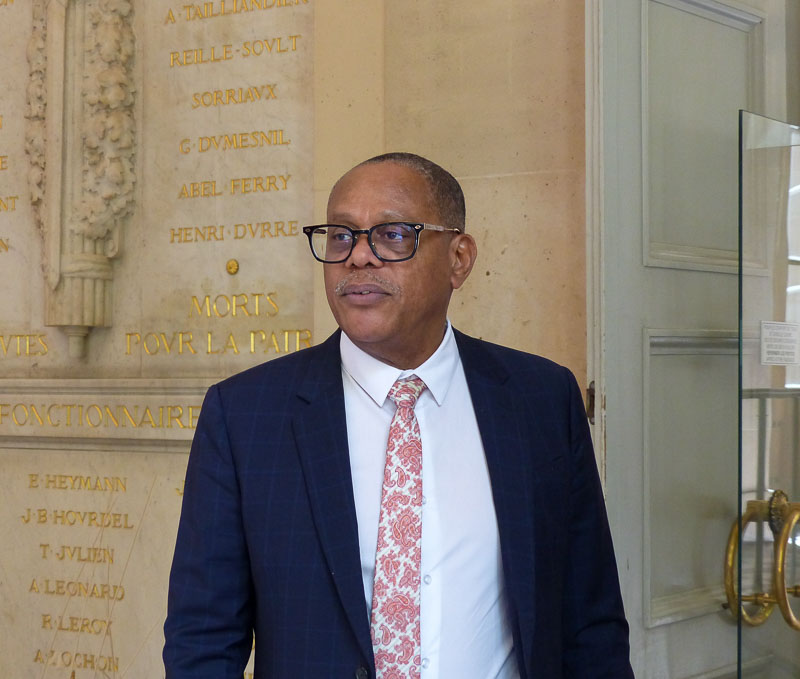

Deputy for Guadeloupe's 2nd constituency in the National Assembly of France
- Incumbent
- Assumed office 19 June 2022
- Preceded by: Justine Benin

Personal details
- Born: 18 June 1962 (age 64)
- Party: PPDG
- Other political affiliations: NUPES

Christian Baptiste (born 18 June 1962) is a French politician who was elected to represent Guadeloupe's 2nd constituency in the 2022 legislative election. Baptise ran as a member of the Progressive Democratic Party of Guadeloupe, a left-wing party affiliated with the New Ecologic and Social People's Union (NUPES) coalition.

== Biography ==
Baptiste formerly served as mayor of Sainte-Anne, Guadeloupe. In 2022, Baptiste defeated incumbent Justine Benin to become the new member of the National Assembly for Guadeloupe's 2nd constituency. He received 58.65% of the vote versus the 41.35% received by Benin.
