= Democrats and Progressives (France) =

Democrats and Progressives Démocrates et Progressistes
- Abbreviation: DP
- President: Xavier Iacovelli
- First Vice President: Patricia Mirallès
- Secretary General: Guillaume Poitoux
- President of the National Council: Agnès Pannier-Runacher
- Spokesperson: Émilie Chalas
- Founders: Jean-Yves Le Drian; Olivier Dussopt; Gilles Savary
- Founded: 1 February 2020
- Split from: LREM; Socialist Party
- Headquarters: Paris
- Ideology: Social liberalism; Social democracy
- Political position: Centre to centre-left
- National affiliation: Ensemble
- European Parliament group: Renew Europe
- Colours: Blue; Pink
- National Assembly: 8 / 577
- Senate: 1 / 348
- European Parliament: 0 / 81

Website
- dptest.createtogether.fr

Democrats and Progressives (French: Démocrates et Progressistes, DP), formerly known as Territories of Progress – Social Reformist Movement (French: Territoires de Progrès – Mouvement social-réformiste, TDP), is a French political party of the centre to centre-left. It was founded in February 2020 by government ministers Jean-Yves Le Drian and Olivier Dussopt formerly of the Socialist Party who had previously left to join the presidential majority (La République En Marche!) of President Emmanuel Macron. Since October 2021, the party's president is Olivier Dussopt. The party constitutes the social democratic or centre-left part of the presidential majority.

As of 2022, it had 46 members of Parliament. Élisabeth Borne was a regular member (not an elected member of Parliament) who, on 16 May 2022, was appointed by President Macron as prime minister to replace Jean Castex.

== Creation ==
Former party logo

The party was officially launched on 1 February 2020, during a meeting in Pantin, Seine-Saint-Denis, then presented at a press conference on 2 July 2020. Senator Xavier Iacovelli became its Secretary General. The party defined itself as "social-democratic, reformist, and progressive."

== Membership ==
=== Senators ===
- Michel Dagbert
- Éric Gold
- André Guiol
- Claude Haut
- Xavier Iacovelli

=== Deputies (2017–2022) ===
Name	Election	Constituency	Group
Stéphane Trompille	2017	Ain's 4th constituency	LREM
Saïd Ahamada	2017	Bouches-du-Rhône's 7th constituency	LREM
Jean-Marc Zulesi	2017	Bouches-du-Rhône's 8th constituency	LREM
Monica Michel	2017	Bouches-du-Rhône's 16th constituency	LREM
Sandra Marsaud	2017	Charente's 2nd constituency	LREM
Philippe Chassaing	2017	Dordogne's 1st constituency	LREM
Fannette Charvier	2017	Doubs's 1st constituency	LREM
Éric Alauzet	2012	Doubs's 2nd constituency	LREM
Denis Sommer	2017	Doubs's 3rd constituency	LREM
Frédéric Barbier	2015	Doubs's 4th constituency	LREM
Didier Le Gac	2017	Finistère's 3rd constituency	LREM
Françoise Dumas	2012	Gard's 1st constituency	LREM
Véronique Hammerer	2017	Gironde's 11th constituency	LREM
Patricia Mirallès	2017	Hérault's 1st constituency	LREM
Laurence Maillart-Méhaignerie	2017	Ille-et-Vilaine's 2nd constituency	LREM
Jean-Charles Colas-Roy	2017	Isère's 2nd constituency	LREM
Émilie Chalas	2017	Isère's 3rd constituency	LREM
Marjolaine Meynier-Millefert	2017	Isère's 10th constituency	LREM
Lionel Causse	2017	Landes's 2nd constituency	LREM
Jean-Michel Mis	2017	Loire's 2nd constituency	LREM
Yves Daniel	2012	Loire-Atlantique's 6th constituency	LREM
Alexandre Freschi	2017	Lot-et-Garonne's 2nd constituency	LREM
Stéphane Travert	2012	Manche's 3rd constituency (since 2018)	LREM
Hervé Pellois	2012	Morbihan's 1st constituency	LREM
Nicole Le Peih	2017	Morbihan's 3rd constituency	LREM
Belkhir Belhaddad	2017	Moselle's 1st constituency	LREM
Christophe Arend	2017	Moselle's 6th constituency	LREM
Patrice Perrot	2017	Nièvre's 2nd constituency	LREM
Brigitte Liso	2017	Nord's 4th constituency	LREM
Catherine Osson	2017	Nord's 8th constituency	LREM
Jacqueline Maquet	2007	Pas-de-Calais's 2nd constituency	LREM
Anne Brugnera	2017	Rhône's 4th constituency	LREM
Anissa Khedher	2017	Rhône's 7th constituency	LREM
Rémy Rebeyrotte	2017	Saône-et-Loire's 3rd constituency	LREM
Anne-Christine Lang	2017	Paris's 10th constituency	LREM
Michèle Peyron	2017	Seine-et-Marne's 9th constituency	LREM
Sophie Beaudouin-Hubière	2017	Haute-Vienne's 1st constituency	LREM
Pierre Venteau	2017	Haute-Vienne's 2nd constituency (since 2019)	LREM
Francis Chouat	2018	Essonne's 1st constituency (since 2018)	LREM
Stéphanie Atger	2017	Essonne's 6th constituency	LREM
Jacques Marilossian	2017	Hauts-de-Seine's 7th constituency	LREM
Laurianne Rossi	2017	Hauts-de-Seine's 11th constituency	LREM
Stéphane Testé	2017	Seine-Saint-Denis's 12th constituency	LREM
François Pupponi	2007	Val-d'Oise's 8th constituency	MoDem

=== Former MPs ===
- Anne-Yvonne Le Dain
- Gilles Savary

=== MEPs ===
- Irène Tolleret
