= Jean-Baptiste Djebbari =

French politician (born 1982)

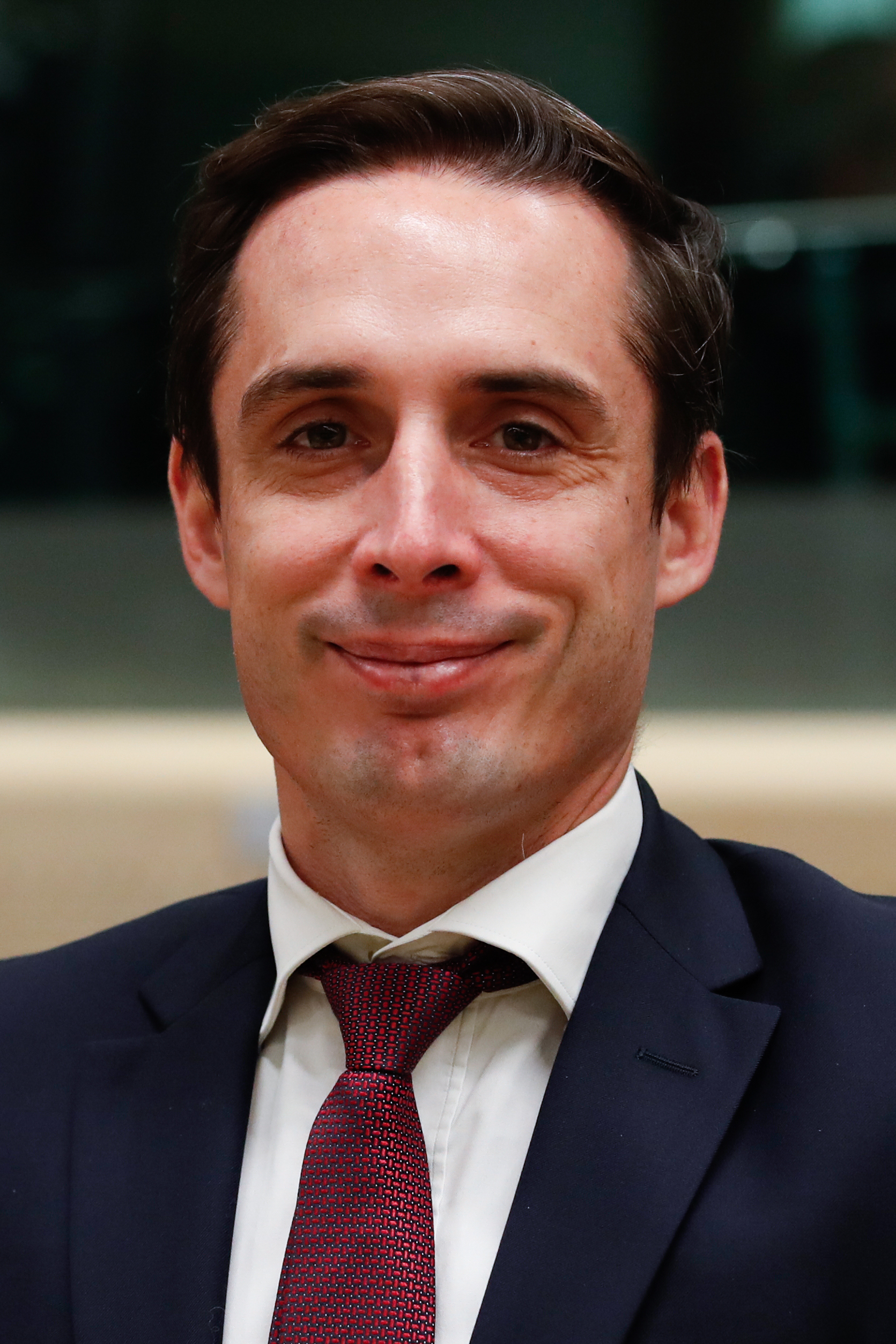
- Djebbari in 2021

Minister of Transport
- In office 3 September 2019 – 16 May 2022
- President: Emmanuel Macron
- Prime Minister: Édouard Philippe; Jean Castex
- Preceded by: Élisabeth Borne
- Succeeded by: Clément Beaune

Member of the National Assembly for Haute-Vienne's 2nd constituency
- In office 21 June 2017 – 3 October 2019
- Preceded by: Daniel Boisserie
- Succeeded by: Pierre Venteau

Personal details
- Born: 26 February 1982 (age 44) Melun, France
- Party: La République En Marche! (since 2016); Territories of Progress (since 2021)
- Education: École nationale de l'aviation civile

Jean-Baptiste Djebbari (French pronunciation: [ʒɑ̃ batist dʒɛbaʁi]; or Djebbari-Bonnet; born 26 February 1982) is a French aircraft pilot and politician of La République En Marche! (LREM).

Djebarri was appointed as Secretary of State for Transport on 3 September 2019 under Prime Minister Édouard Philippe. His rank was elevated to Minister Delegate under the leadership of Ecology Minister Barbara Pompili on 6 June 2020, when newly appointed Prime Minister Jean Castex presented his government. From 2017 until 2019, Djebbari was a member of the National Assembly, where he represented the 2nd constituency of the Haute-Vienne department.

== Early life and education ==
Djebbari was born in Melun, Seine-et-Marne, the son of a father of Algerian origin and a housewife. He graduated from the École nationale de l'aviation civile in 2005, Technicien supérieur des études et de l'exploitation de l'aviation civile training course.

== Political career ==
In parliament, Djebbari served as the LREM group's coordinator on the Committee on Sustainable Development and Regional Planning from 2017 until 2019. In this capacity, he was the rapporteur on a 2018 bill on the reform of the SNCF. From January until September 2019, he later served as one of his parliamentary group's spokespersons under the leadership of its chairman Gilles Le Gendre.

In September 2019, Djebbari joined the government of Prime Minister Édouard Philippe and was appointed Secretary of State for Transport in the Ministry of Ecology, led by Élisabeth Borne. Early in his tenure, he led unsuccessful efforts to rescue French airline Aigle Azur until a commercial court rejected financial rescue offers. He later led efforts on introducing a 2021 national law prohibiting domestic flights that can be replaced by a rail journey of less than two-and-a-half hours.

Within his LREM party, Djebarri was in charge of advising chairman Stanislas Guerini on campaign financing ahead of the 2022 French presidential election.

== Political positions ==
In July 2019, Djebbari voted in favor of the French ratification of the European Union’s Comprehensive Economic and Trade Agreement (CETA) with Canada.

Following the murder of Samuel Paty in 2020, Djebbari said he was "largely in favor" of using artificial intelligence to fight terrorism on public transport networks if individuals' privacy rights were respected.

== Life after politics ==
In 2022, Djebbari was appointed to the board of directors of hydrogen carmaker Hopium.

== See also ==
- 2017 French legislative election
- Castex government
