= Results of the 2024 French legislative election in Haute-Vienne =

Following the first round of the 2024 French legislative election on 30 June 2024, runoff elections in each constituency where no candidate received a vote share greater than 50 percent were scheduled for 7 July. Candidates permitted to stand in the runoff elections needed to either come in first or second place in the first round or achieve more than 12.5 percent of the votes of the entire electorate (as opposed to 12.5 percent of the vote share due to low turnout).

== Haute-Vienne ==
=== 1st constituency ===
Candidate	Party or alliance		First round		Second round	
Candidate	Party or alliance		Votes	%	Votes	%
Damien Maudet	New Popular Front	La France Insoumise	21,271	36.94	24,713	42.20
Camille Dos Santos de Oliveira	National Rally		18,904	32.83	20,400	34.83
Isabelle Negrier	Ensemble	Miscellaneous centre	15,544	26.99	13,453	22.97
Serge Moretti	Sovereigntist right	Debout la France	1,066	1.85		
Elisabeth Faucon	Far-left	Lutte Ouvrière	803	1.39		
Total			57,588	100.00	58,566	100.00
Valid votes			57,588	96.06	58,566	96.70
Invalid votes			959	1.60	760	1.25
Blank votes			1,403	2.34	1,239	2.05
Total votes			59,950	100.00	60,565	100.00
Registered voters/turnout			83,948	71.41	83,963	72.13

=== 2nd constituency ===
Candidate	Party or alliance		First round		Second round	
Candidate	Party or alliance		Votes	%	Votes	%
Sabrina Minguet	National Rally		25,539	36.86	28,751	43.94
Stéphane Delautrette	New Popular Front	Socialist Party	25,520	36.83	36,679	56.06
Marie-Eve Tayot	Ensemble	Miscellaneous centre	16,937	24.45		
Claudine Roussie	Far-left	Lutte Ouvrière	1,290	1.86		
Total			69,286	100.00	65,430	100.00
Valid votes			69,286	95.35	65,430	90.23
Invalid votes			1,502	2.07	2,543	3.51
Blank votes			1,875	2.58	4,543	6.26
Total votes			72,663	100.00	72,516	100.00
Registered voters/turnout			98,338	73.89	98,351	73.73

=== 3rd constituency ===
Candidate	Party or alliance		First round		Second round	
Candidate	Party or alliance		Votes	%	Votes	%
Manon Meunier	New Popular Front	La France Insoumise	19,494	35.18	23,095	40.76
Albin Freychet	National Rally		19,310	34.85	20,992	37.05
Gilles Toulza	Ensemble	Miscellaneous centre	14,768	26.65	12,573	22.19
Zohra Radjetti	Sovereigntist right	Debout la France	1,044	1.88		
Daniel Mournetas	Far-left	Lutte Ouvrière	797	1.44		
Total			55,413	100.00	56,660	100.00
Valid votes			55,413	95.40	56,660	96.42
Invalid votes			1,122	1.93	826	1.41
Blank votes			1,551	2.67	1,277	2.17
Total votes			58,086	100.00	58,763	100.00
Registered voters/turnout			81,393	71.36	81,414	72.18
