= Gérard Lorgeoux =

French politician

Member of the National Assembly for Morbihan's 3rd constituency
- In office 2002–2012
- Preceded by: Jean-Charles Cavaillé
- Succeeded by: Jean-Pierre Le Roch

Personal details
- Born: 21 August 1943 (age 82) Plumelin
- Party: PS

Gérard Lorgeoux (born August 21, 1943 in Plumelin) was a member of the National Assembly of France. He represented Morbihan's 3rd constituency from 2002 to 2012 as a member of the Union for a Popular Movement.
