= Michel Tombereau =

French painter (1945–2026)

- Born: 31 May 1945; Nîmes, France
- Died: 12 January 2026 (aged 80)
- Occupation: Painter

Michel Tombereau (French: [miʃɛl tɔ̃bəʁo]; 31 May 1945 – 12 January 2026) was a French painter.

== Life and career ==
Born in Nîmes on 31 May 1945, Tombereau taught at the Lycée Charles-Gide d'Uzès and later the Collège Jean Vilar de Saint-Gilles until his retirement in 2005. He had two daughters with his wife Geneviève: Clemence and Stéphanie. As a self-taught artist, he often portrayed seascapes, themes of bullfighting, and flowers.

In 2014, Tombereau unsuccessfully ran for a seat on the municipal council of Le Grau-du-Roi on the miscellaneous right list. In 2019, he announced his support for Yvan Lachaud for the mayorship of Nîmes in the following year's election.

Tombereau died on 12 January 2026, at the age of 80, following a severe case of the flu.

== Exposition ==
- Villa Parry (Le Grau-du-Roi, 2012)
