= Françoise Dumas =

French politician

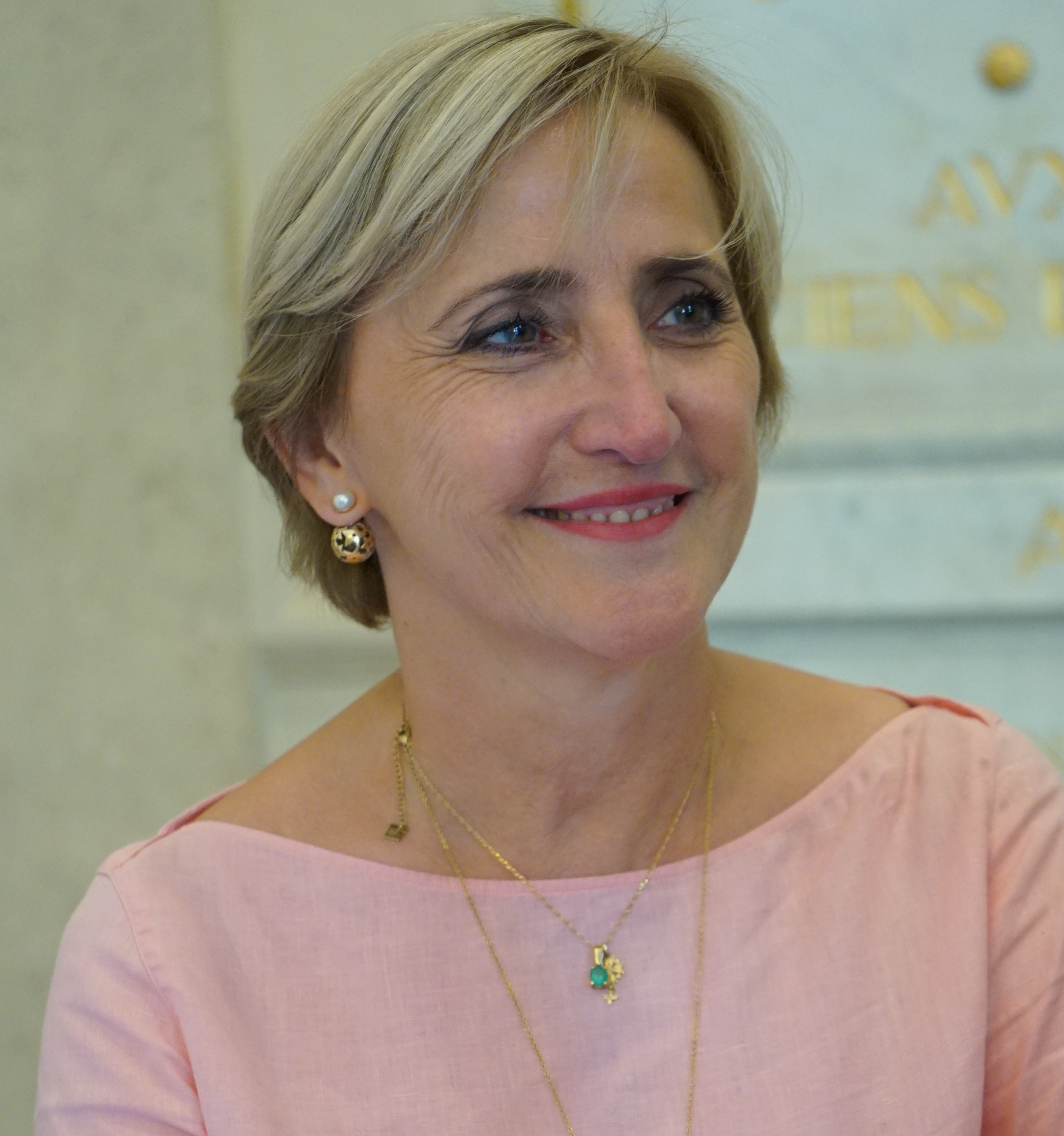

Member of the Municipal council of Nîmes
- In office 2014–2020
- Mayor: Jean-Paul Fournier

Member of the National Assembly for Gard's 1st constituency
- In office 17 June 2012 – 22 June 2022
- Preceded by: Yvan Lachaud
- Succeeded by: Yoann Gillet

Personal details
- Born: 12 April 1960 (age 66) Alès, France
- Party: Renaissance
- Children: 2

Françoise Dumas (born 12 April 1960 in Alès) is a French politician of La République En Marche! (LREM) and of Territories of Progress (TDP) who was a member of the National Assembly of France from 2012 to 2022, representing Gard's 1st constituency. She was previously a member of the Socialist Party.

== Political career ==
In parliament, Dumas served as member of the National Defence and Armed Forces Committee; from 2019 to 2022, she was the committee's chairwoman. She was also a member of the Committee on European Affairs.

In addition to her committee assignments, Dumas was part of the parliamentary friendship groups with Cameroon, Gabon and Peru.

In the 2022 elections, Dumas lost in the second round to Yoann Gillet of National Rally.

== Political positions ==
In July 2019, Dumas voted in favor of the French ratification of the European Union’s Comprehensive Economic and Trade Agreement (CETA) with Canada.
