= Jean-Pierre Dufau =

French politician

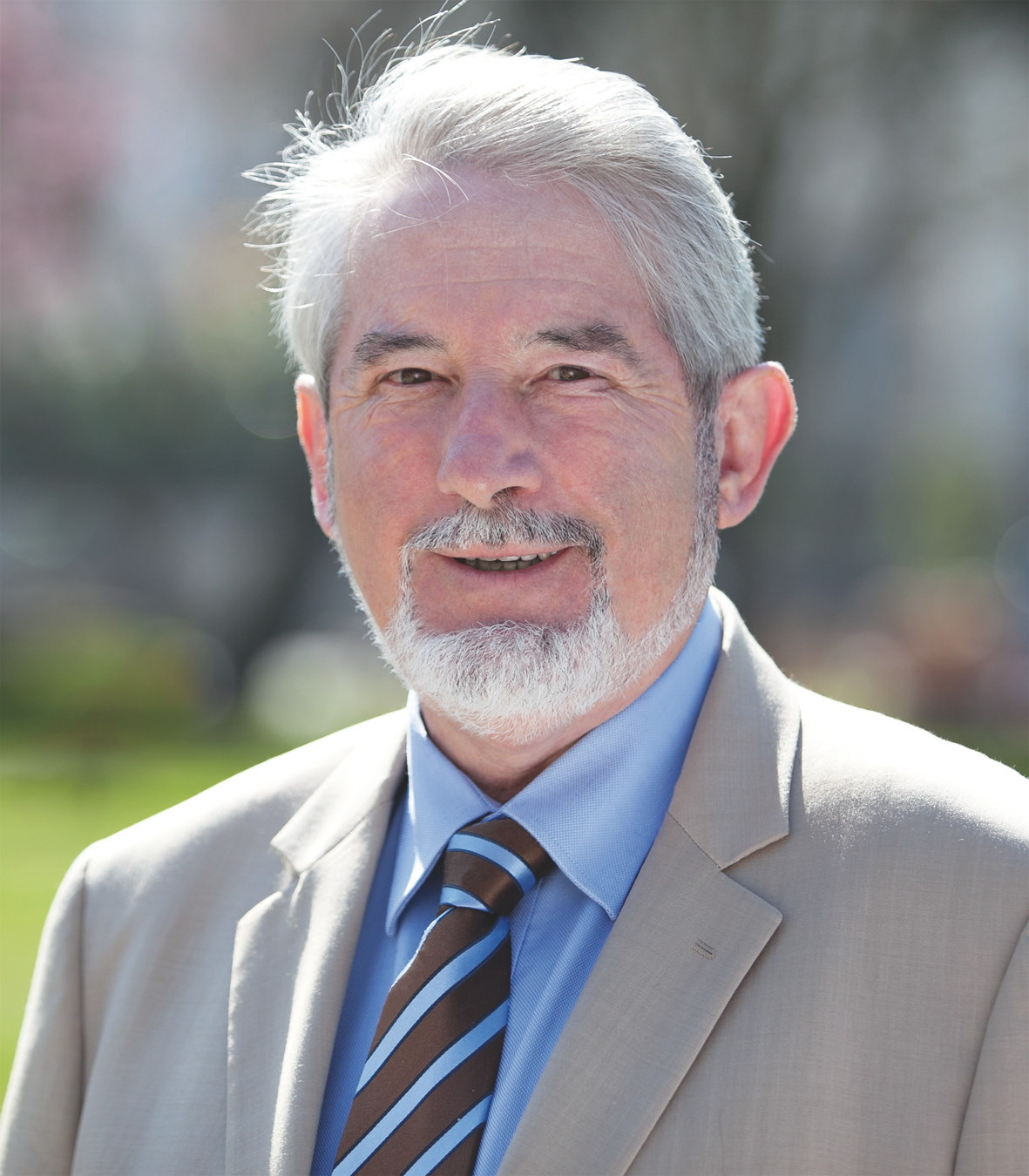
- Jean-Pierre Dufau in April 2012
- Parliamentary group: Socialist

Deputy for Landes's 2nd constituency in the National Assembly of France
- In office 1997–2017
- Preceded by: Henri Lalanne
- Succeeded by: Lionel Causse

Personal details
- Born: 5 July 1943 (age 82) Capbreton, Landes

Jean-Pierre Dufau (born 5 July 1943 in Capbreton) was a member of the National Assembly of France. He represented Landes's 2nd constituency from 1997 to 2017 as a member of the Socialiste, radical, citoyen et divers gauche.
