= Nicole Le Peih =

French politician

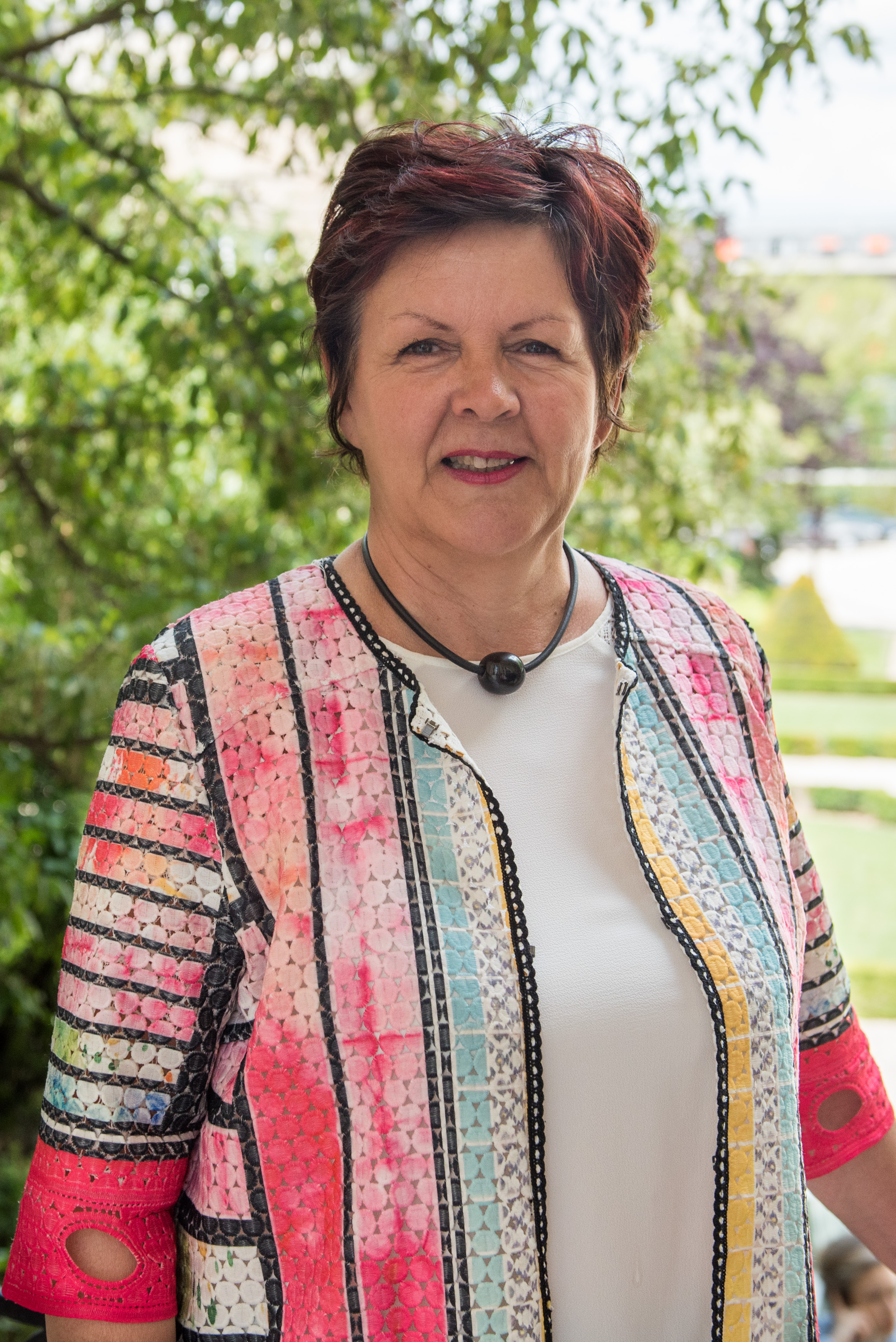

Member of the National Assembly for Morbihan's 3rd constituency
- Incumbent
- Assumed office 21 June 2017
- Preceded by: Jean-Pierre Le Roch

Personal details
- Born: 28 September 1959 (age 66) Pontivy, France
- Party: La République En Marche! Territories of Progress

Nicole Le Peih (born 28 September 1959) is a French politician of La République En Marche! (LREM) and Territories of Progress (TDP) who has been serving as a member of the French National Assembly since the 2017 elections, representing the department of Morbihan.

== Political career ==
In parliament, Le Peih serves on the Committee on Foreign Affairs and the Committee on European Affairs. In addition to her committee assignments, she is a member of the French parliamentary friendship groups with Bolivia and Cuba.

== Political positions ==
In July 2019, Le Peih voted in favor of the French ratification of the European Union’s Comprehensive Economic and Trade Agreement (CETA) with Canada.

== See also ==
- 2017 French legislative election
