= Gard's 1st constituency =

Constituency of the National Assembly of France

1st constituency of Gard
- inline Constituency of the National Assembly of France

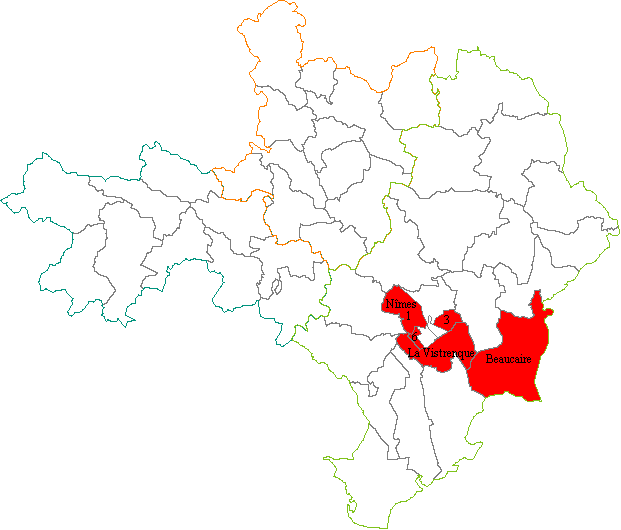
- Location of constituency in Department

- Gard in France
- Deputy: Yoann Gillet; RN
- Department: Gard
- Cantons: (pre-2015) Beaucaire, Nîmes-1, Nîmes-3, Nîmes-6, La Vistrenque
- Registered voters: 125,281

The 1st constituency of Gard is a French legislative constituency in the Gard département. It consists of the (pre-2015) cantons of Beaucaire, Nîmes 1, 3 and 6 and Vistrenque.

== Deputies ==
Election	Member	Party
1988	Jean Bousquet	UDF
1993	Jean Bousquet	UDF
1997	Alain Clary	PCF
2002	Yvan Lachaud	UDF
2007	Yvan Lachaud	NC
2012	Françoise Dumas	PS
2017	Françoise Dumas	LREM
2022	Yoann Gillet	RN
2024	Yoann Gillet	RN

== Election results ==
=== 2024 ===
Candidate	Party	Alliance	First round			Second round		
Candidate	Party	Alliance	Votes	%	+/–	Votes	%	+/–
Yoann Gillet	RN		24,894	43.91	+12.26	28,259	54.22	+2.21
Charles Menard	LFI	NFP	16,747	29.54	+5.61	23,856	45.78	new
Valérie Rouverand	REN	Ensemble	11,394	20.10	-5.11	withdrew		
Loumy Bourghol	LR	UDC	3,076	5.43	-0.39			
Isabelle Leclerc	LO		587	1.04	+1.04			
Votes			56,698	100.00		52,115	100.00	
Valid votes			56,698	97.87	+0.06	52,115	90.74	-0.50
Blank votes			867	1.50	-0.03	4,021	7.00	+0.49
Null votes			367	0.63	-0.03	1,299	2.26	+0.01
Turnout			57,932	64.11	+22.36	57,435	63.54	+22.12
Abstentions			32,430	35.89	-22.36	1,299	36.46	-22.12
Registered voters			90,362			90,395		
Result			RN HOLD					

=== 2022 ===
Legislative Election 2022: Gard's 1st constituency
Party	Candidate	Votes	%	±%
RN	Yoann Gillet	11,547	31.65	+3.56
LREM (Ensemble)	Françoise Dumas	9,200	25.21	-3.22
LFI (NUPÉS)	Charles Menard	8,731	23.93	+5.41
REC	Erick Cavaglia	2,269	6.22	N/A
LR (UDC)	Véronique Gardeur-Bancel	2,125	5.82	−8.90
DVE	Sylvie Danjou	732	2.01	N/A
Others	N/A	1,885		
Turnout		36,489	41.75	−1.96
2nd round result
RN	Yoann Gillet	17,564	52.01	+6.56
LREM (Ensemble)	Françoise Dumas	16,209	47.99	−6.56
Turnout		33,773	41.42	+1.15
RN gain from LREM				

=== 2017 ===
Candidate	Label	First round		Second round	
Candidate	Label	Votes	%	Votes	%
Françoise Dumas	LREM	10,549	28.43	17,365	54.55
Yoann Gillet	FN	10,423	28.09	14,470	45.45
Thierry Procida	UDI	5,462	14.72		
Yannick Battefort	LFI	3,688	9.94		
Sylvette Fayet	PCF	2,050	5.52		
Hacen Boukhelifa	DVG	1,184	3.19		
Dominique Andrieu-Bonnet	ECO	1,135	3.06		
Jean-Paul Boré	DIV	760	2.05		
Pascaline Fostyk	DLF	647	1.74		
Lysiane Coillet-Matillon	ECO	475	1.28		
Isabelle Leclerc	EXG	226	0.61		
Tristan Seguin	DIV	189	0.51		
Nasser Mohamedi	ECO	178	0.48		
Deniz Ozdemir	DIV	79	0.21		
Michel Flaisler	DIV	65	0.18		
Votes		37,110	100.00	31,835	100.00
Valid votes		37,110	97.66	31,835	90.93
Blank votes		594	1.56	2,256	6.44
Null votes		296	0.78	921	2.63
Turnout		38,000	43.71	35,012	40.27
Abstentions		48,943	56.29	51,929	59.73
Registered voters		86,943		86,941	
Source: Ministry of the Interior

=== 2012 ===
2012 legislative election in Gard's 1st constituency
Candidate	Party	First round		Second round	
Candidate	Party	Votes	%	Votes	%
Françoise Dumas	PS–EELV	14,545	30.31%	20,694	41.89%
Yvan Lachaud	NC	13,920	29.01%	16,923	34.26%
Julien Sanchez	FN	12,487	26.02%	11,781	23.85%
Sylvette Fayet	FG	3,653	7.61%		
Jacques Bourbousson	PRV	1,253	2.61%		
Dominique Grossetete	EELV dissident	496	1.03%		
Lysiane Coillet-Matillon	??	379	0.79%		
Jacques Armando	DLR	282	0.59%		
Fatima Rag El Hassi	MRC	248	0.52%		
Robert Ponge	UDN	211	0.44%		
Guy Dejean	NPA	133	0.28%		
Isabelle Leclerc	LO	119	0.25%		
Anne Alirol	POC	102	0.21%		
Michel Albanese	AEI	90	0.19%		
Catherine Andre	AR	72	0.15%		
Valid votes		47,990	98.91%	49,398	98.69%
Spoilt and null votes		528	1.09%	658	1.31%
Votes cast / turnout		48,518	58.18%	50,056	60.04%
Abstentions		34,881	41.82%	33,319	39.96%
Registered voters		83,399	100.00%	83,375	100.00%

=== 2007 ===
Legislative Election 2007: Gard's 1st constituency
Party	Candidate	Votes	%	±%
NM	Yvan Lachaud	20,891	44.79	
PS	Françoise Dumas	8,324	17.85	
PCF	Alain Clary	6,902	14.80	
FN	Evelyne Ruty	3,058	6.56	
DIV	Gérard Chayne	1,028	2.20	
LV	Ali Karrim	977	2.09	
Others	N/A	3,387		
Turnout		47,450	57.08	
2nd round result
NM	Yvan Lachaud	25,717	56.96	
PS	Françoise Dumas	19,432	43.04	
Turnout		46,913	56.47	
NM gain from UDF				

=== 2002 ===
Legislative Election 2002: Gard's 1st constituency
Party	Candidate	Votes	%	±%
UDF	Yvan Lachaud	16,947	36.59	
PCF	Alain Clary	13,046	28.17	
FN	Evelyne Ruty	8,902	19.22	
PRG	Jocelyne Pezet-Romieux	1,802	3.89	
Others	N/A	5,617		
Turnout		47,265	61.27	
2nd round result
UDF	Yvan Lachaud	24,120	56.90	
PCF	Alain Clary	18,273	43.10	
Turnout		44,532	57.74	
UDF gain from PCF				

=== 1997 ===
Legislative Election 1997: Gard's 1st constituency
Party	Candidate	Votes	%	±%
UDF	Yvan Lachaud	12,304	26.57	
FN	Serge Martinez	11,782	25.45	
PCF	Alain Clary	10,100	21.81	
PS	Bernard Finiel	7,120	15.38	
LV	Martine Gros-Aguilera	1,257	2.71	
Others	N/A	3,739		
Turnout		48,151	65.53	
2nd round result
PCF	Alain Clary	21,185	41.20	
UDF	Yvan Lachaud	20,819	40.49	
FN	Serge Martinez	9,413	18.31	
Turnout		53,151	72.35	
PCF gain from UDF				

== Sources ==
- French Interior Ministry results website: "Résultats électoraux officiels en France" (in French).
