= Lionel Causse =

French politician (born 1971)

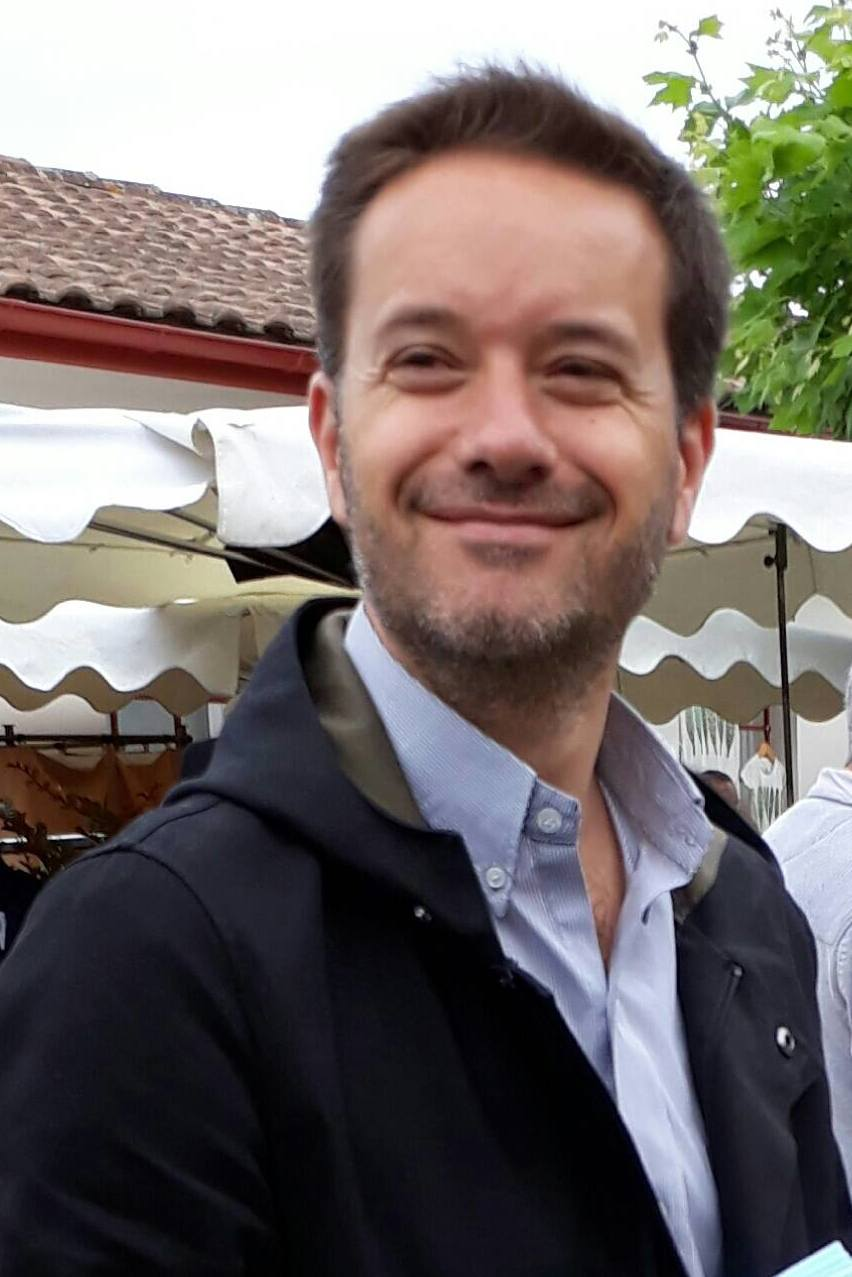

Member of the National Assembly for Landes's 2nd constituency
- Incumbent
- Assumed office 21 June 2017
- Preceded by: Jean-Pierre Dufau

Personal details
- Born: 6 May 1971 (age 54) Toulouse, France
- Party: PS (until 2015); LREM (since 2016)

Lionel Causse (born 6 May 1971) is a French politician of La République En Marche! (LREM) and Territories of Progress (TDP) who has been serving as a member of the French National Assembly since the 2017 elections, representing the department of Landes.

== Political career ==
Causse holds a position in the Bureau of the National Assembly of the 15th legislature of the French Fifth Republic as a secretary, under the leadership of president Richard Ferrand. He also serves on the Committee on the Sustainable Development and Spatial Planning. In addition to his committee assignments, he is a member of the French-Burmese Parliamentary Friendship Group and the French-Laos Parliamentary Friendship Group.

In July 2019, Causse was one of nine LREM members who voted against his parliamentary group's majority and opposed the French ratification of the European Union’s Comprehensive Economic and Trade Agreement (CETA) with Canada.

== See also ==
- 2017 French legislative election
