= Michel Dagbert =

French politician

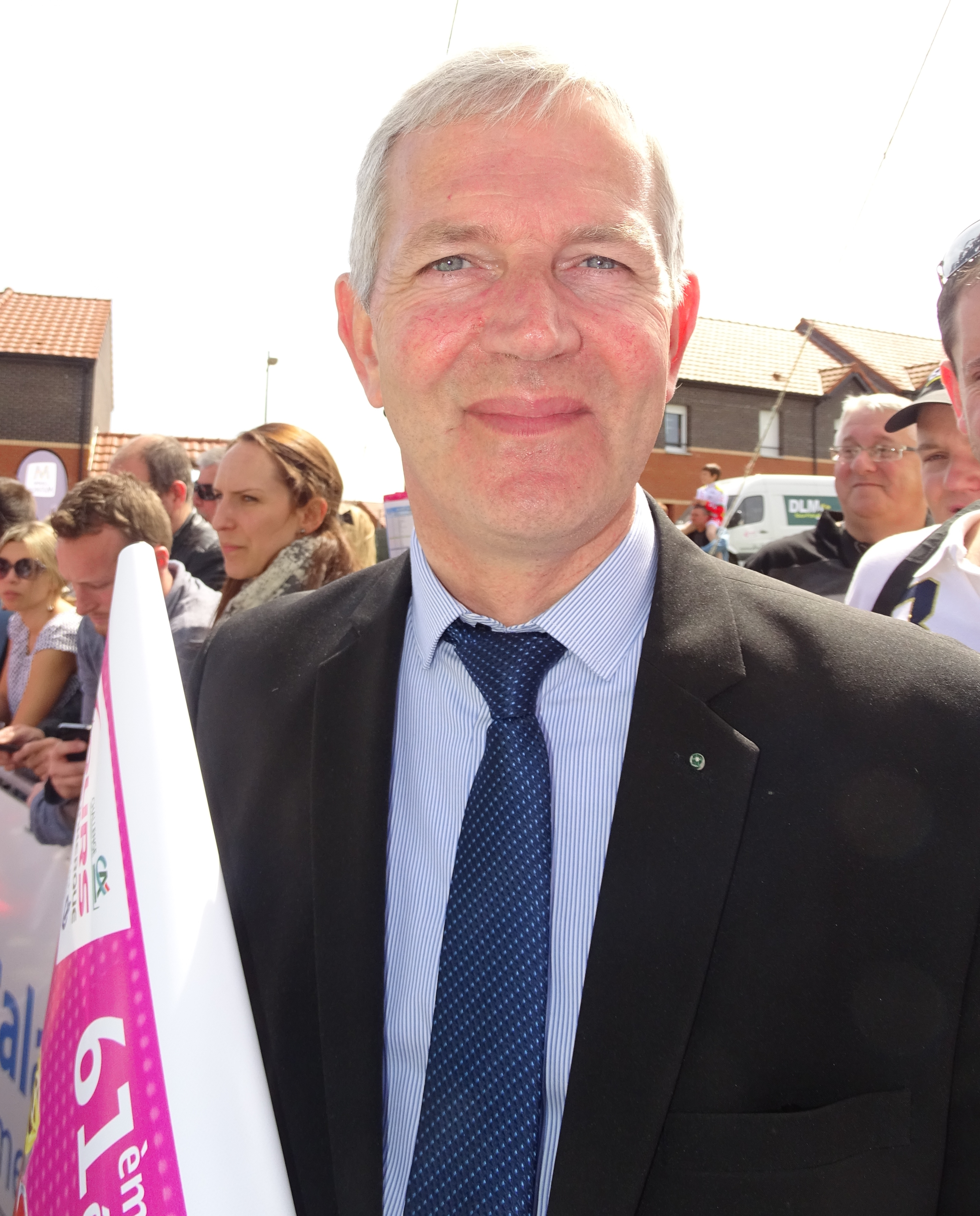

President of the General Council of Pas-de-Calais
- Incumbent
- Assumed office 23 June 2014
- Preceded by: Dominique Dupilet

Mayor of Barlin
- In office 1 June 2002 – 2 July 2014
- Preceded by: Joseph Brabant
- Succeeded by: Gérard Paillard

Personal details
- Born: 28 January 1962 (age 64) Barlin, Pas-de-Calais
- Party: Socialist Party

Michel Dagbert (born 28 January 1962 in Barlin, Pas-de-Calais) is a French politician. He is the President of the General Council of the Pas-de-Calais department, and is a member of the Socialist Party. He was the Mayor of Barlin from 2002 to 2014.
