= Sandrine Runel =

French politician (born 1979)

Member of the French National Assembly for Rhône's 4th constituency
- Incumbent
- Assumed office 18 July 2024
- Preceded by: Anne Brugnera

Personal details
- Born: 1 June 1979 (age 46)
- Party: Socialist Party
- Other political affiliations: New Popular Front

Sandrine Runel (born 1 June 1979) is a French politician of the Socialist Party. In the 2024 legislative election, she was elected member of the National Assembly for Rhône's 4th constituency. Until her election, she served as deputy mayor of Lyon. From 2014 to 2020, she served as deputy mayor of the 8th arrondissement of Lyon.
