= Isère's 3rd constituency =

Constituency of the National Assembly of France

3rd constituency of Isère
- inline Constituency of the National Assembly of France

- Constituency in Department

- Location of Isère in France
- Deputy: Élisa Martin; LFI
- Department: Isère

The 3rd constituency of Isère is one of ten French legislative constituencies in the Isère département.

It was defined in 1986 to cover the then cantons of Fontaine-Sassenage and Grenoble III, V and VI.

== Deputies ==
Election	Member	Party
1988	Michel Destot	PS
1993	Michel Destot	PS
1997	Michel Destot	PS
2002	Michel Destot	PS
2007	Michel Destot	PS
2012	Michel Destot	PS
2017	Émilie Chalas	REM
2022	Élisa Martin	LFI
2024	Élisa Martin	LFI

== Election results ==
=== 2024 ===
Candidate	Party	Alliance	First round			Second round		
Candidate	Party	Alliance	Votes	%	+/–	Votes	%	+/–
Élisa Martin	LFI	NFP	16,933	42.84	+0.35	24,837	69.61	+12.13
Christel Dupré	RN		8,989	22.74	+10.90	10,844	30.39	new
Émilie Chalas	REN	Ensemble	7,908	20.01	-4.59	withdrew		
Stéphane Gemmani	PS	diss.	3,059	7.74	+1.71			
Coline Genevois	LR	UDC	1,103	2.79	-4.30			
M’Hamed Benharouga	DIV		370	0.94	new			
Khemisti Boubeker	DIV		289	0.73	new			
Isabelle Fassion	REC		251	0.63	-2.74			
Catherine Brun	LO		223	0.56	-0.35			
Louiliam Clot	ECO		181	0.46	new			
Baptiste Anglade	NPA		142	0.36	new			
Samuel Le Fourn	POID		82	0.21	-0.22			
Votes			36,530	100.00		35,681	100.00	
Valid votes			39,530	98.27	-0.49	35,681	90.63	-4.54
Blank votes			446	1.11	+0.22	2,898	7.36	+3.84
Null votes			250	0.62	+0.27	792	2.01	+0.70
Turnout			40,226	70.01	+21.54	39,371	68.44	+22.05
Abstentions			17,232	29.99	-21.54	18,155	31.56	-22.05
Registered voters			57,458			57,526		
Result			LFI HOLD					

Stéphane Gemmani ran for election as a dissident member of PS, without the endorsement for NFP.

=== 2022 ===
Legislative Election 2022: Isère's 3rd constituency
Party	Candidate	Votes	%	±%
LFI (NUPÉS)	Élisa Martin	12,284	42.49	+3.03
LREM (Ensemble)	Émilie Chalas	7,112	24.60	-9.58
RN	Christel Dupré	3,424	11.84	+2.26
LR (UDC)	Clément Chappet	2,049	7.09	−1.61
DVE	Stéphane Gemmani	1,743	6.03	N/A
REC	Lucie Tivolle	975	3.37	N/A
DVE	Isabelle Jimenez Debeze	610	2.11	N/A
Others	N/A	714		
Turnout		28,911	48.47	+2.00
2nd round result
LFI (NUPÉS)	Élisa Martin	15,326	57.48	+11.49
LREM (Ensemble)	Émilie Chalas	11,338	42.52	−11.49
Turnout		26,664	46.39	+6.42
LFI gain from LREM		Swing	+11.49	

=== 2017 ===
Candidate	Label	First round		Second round	
Candidate	Label	Votes	%	Votes	%
Émilie Chalas	REM	9,940	36.18	12,014	54.01
Raphaël Briot	FI	4,040	14.71	10,232	45.99
Soukaïna Larabi	ECO	3,091	11.25		
Michel Destot	PS	2,755	10.03		
Béatrix Bolvin	FN	2,633	9.58		
Élodie Léger	LR	2,389	8.70		
Jean-Paul Trovero	PCF	953	3.47		
Alain Bonnet	DLF	422	1.54		
Josiane Hirel	ECO	401	1.46		
Patrick de Verdière	DVG	241	0.88		
Paul Baron	DIV	239	0.87		
Catherine Brun	EXG	203	0.74		
Yazid Bensalem	DVG	88	0.32		
Abdelkader Benyoub	DVG	77	0.28		
Votes		27,472	100.00	22,246	100.00
Valid votes		27,472	98.69	22,246	93.10
Blank votes		263	0.94	1,181	4.94
Null votes		102	0.37	467	1.95
Turnout		27,837	46.57	23,894	39.97
Abstentions		31,943	53.43	35,882	60.03
Registered voters		59,780		59,776	
Source: Ministry of the Interior

=== 2012 ===
2012 legislative election in Isere's 3rd constituency
Candidate	Party	First round		Second round	
Candidate	Party	Votes	%	Votes	%
Michel Destot	PS	13,124	40.49%	19,076	66.13%
Nathalie Beranger	UMP	6,272	19.35%	9,772	33.87%
Jean-René Breuil	FN	4,156	12.82%		
Patrice Voir	FG	3,330	10.27%		
Yann Mongaburu	EELV	2,821	8.70%		
Marie-Claire Nepi	MoDem	851	2.63%		
Josiane Hirel	??	339	1.05%		
Eléonore Perrier	MRC	318	0.98%		
Mazdak Kafai	NPA	291	0.90%		
Abdelaziz Serrag	AEI	245	0.76%		
Lahcen Benmaza		177	0.55%		
Catherine Brun	LO	158	0.49%		
Christine Favaro	DR	149	0.46%		
Geoffrey Excoffon	POI	100	0.31%		
Benoît Odille	SP	55	0.17%		
Alain Guezou		28	0.09%		
Valid votes		32,414	99.03%	28,848	96.16%
Spoilt and null votes		319	0.97%	1,151	3.84%
Votes cast / turnout		32,733	55.24%	29,999	50.62%
Abstentions		26,526	44.76%	29,260	49.38%
Registered voters		59,259	100.00%	59,259	100.00%

=== 2007 ===
Legislative Election 2007: Isère's 3rd constituency
Party	Candidate	Votes	%	±%
PS	Michel Destot	12,656	37.79	
UMP	Nathalie Beranger	5,629	16.81	
DVD	Matthieu Chamussy	5,326	15.90	
MoDem	Nicolas Pinel	3,222	9.62	
LV	Christine Garnier	1,829	5.46	
PCF	Zohra Chorfa	1,096	3.27	
Far left	Mazdak Kafai	1,045	3.12	
FN	Raymond Bailly	928	2.77	
Others	N/A	1,757		
Turnout		33,889	56.17	
2nd round result
PS	Michel Destot	20,088	61.95	
UMP	Nathalie Beranger	12,340	38.05	
Turnout		33,413	55.38	
PS hold				

=== 2002 ===
Legislative Election 2002: Isère's 3rd constituency
Party	Candidate	Votes	%	±%
PS	Michel Destot	13,226	38.51	
DVD	Matthieu Chamussy	6,046	17.60	
UMP	Francoise Paramelle	5,353	15.59	
FN	Nadine Bernard	3,259	9.49	
LV	Florence Joussellin	1,868	5.44	
PCF	Maryvonne Matheoud	1,204	3.51	
LCR	Roseline Vachetta	793	2.31	
Others	N/A	2,598		
Turnout		34,886	64.12	
2nd round result
PS	Michel Destot	17,275	57.20	
DVD	Matthieu Chamussy	12,928	42.80	
Turnout		31,386	57.69	
PS hold				

=== 1997 ===
Legislative Election 1997: Isère's 3rd constituency
Party	Candidate	Votes	%	±%
PS	Michel Destot	10,460	32.32	
UDF	Pierre-Marie Berthet	6,662	20.58	
FN	Alain Dugelay	4,803	14.84	
PCF	Yannick Boulard	3,777	11.67	
Far left	Joëlle Diot	1,859	5.74	
LO	Roland Calmel	1,012	3.13	
GE	Bernard Burte	763	2.36	
DIV	Louis Trabut	702	2.17	
Others	N/A	2,329		
Turnout		33,606	61.69	
2nd round result
PS	Michel Destot	20,855	61.93	
UDF	Pierre-Marie Berthet	12,818	38.07	
Turnout		35,647	65.44	
PS hold				
