= Élisa Martin =

French politician (born 1972)

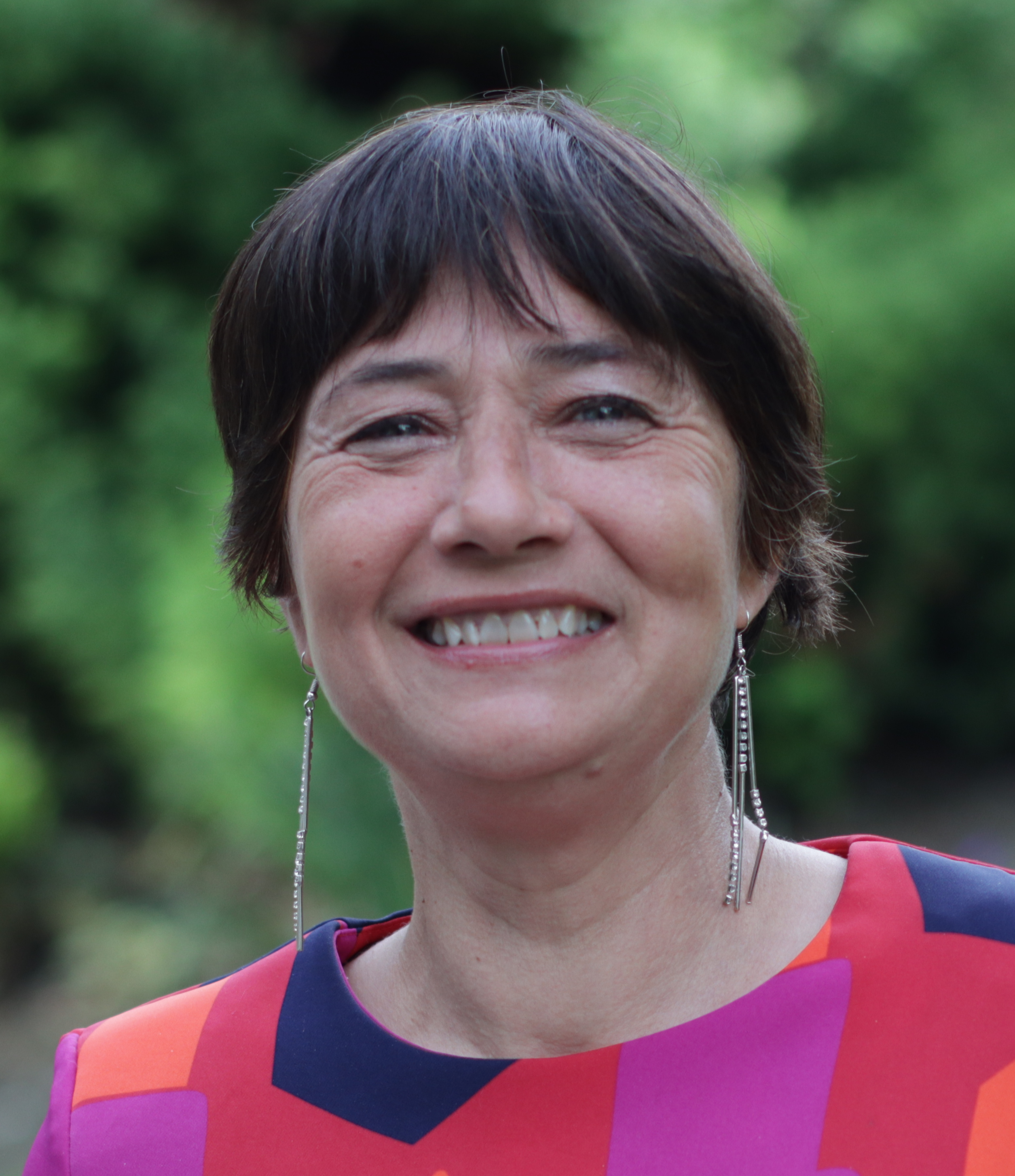
- Élisa Martin in 2022

Member of the National Assembly for Isère's 3rd constituency
- Incumbent
- Assumed office 22 June 2022
- Preceded by: Émilie Chalas

Personal details
- Born: 15 May 1972 (age 53) Nancy, France
- Party: La France Insoumise (since 2016)
- Other political affiliations: NUPES (2022)

Élisa Martin (born 15 May 1972) is a French politician from La France Insoumise. She became the Member of Parliament for Isère's 3rd constituency in the 2022 French legislative election. In the 2022 French legislative election, she unseated En marche MP Émilie Chalas. She was re-elected in the 2024 French legislative election.

== See also ==
- List of deputies of the 16th National Assembly of France
- List of deputies of the 17th National Assembly of France
