= Xavier Iacovelli =

French politician (born 1981)

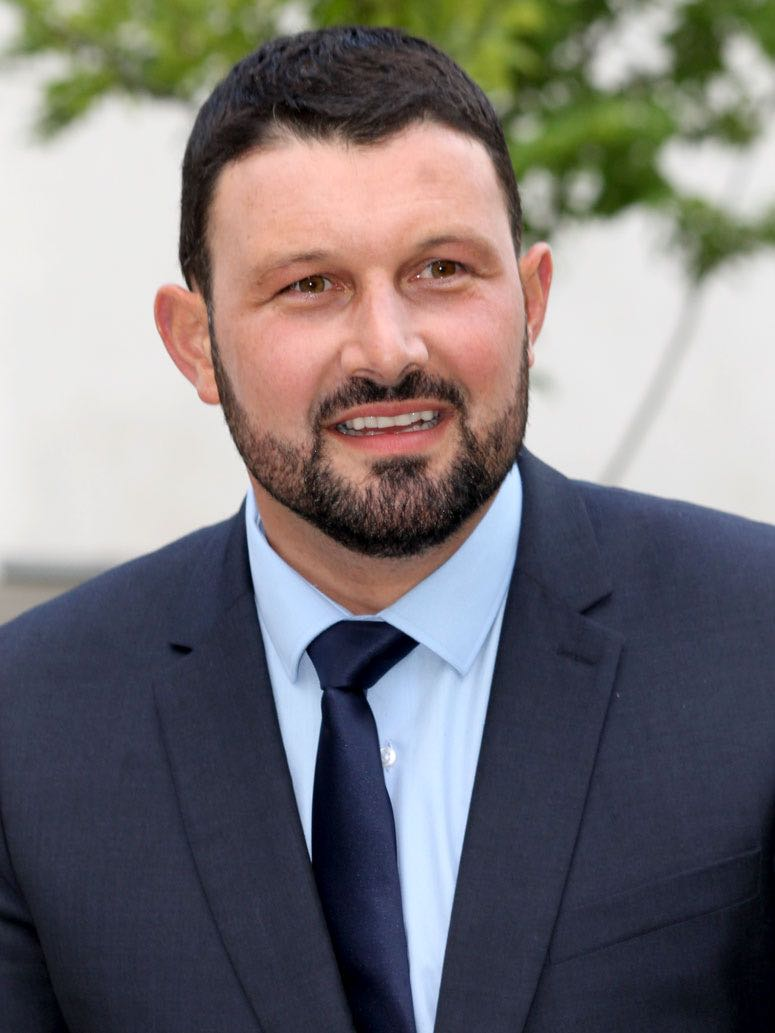

Member of the French Senate for Hauts-de-Seine
- Incumbent
- Assumed office 1 October 2017
- Preceded by: Philippe Kaltenbach

Personal details
- Born: 31 March 1981 (age 44) Suresnes, France
- Party: Socialist Party; La République En Marche! Territories of Progress

Xavier Iacovelli (born 31 March 1981) is a French politician who has been a member of the French Senate for Hauts-de-Seine since 2017.

== Career ==
He was the vice president of the La République En Marche group in the Senate.

He is the Secretary General of Territories of Progress.
