= Anne Brugnera =

French politician (born 1970)

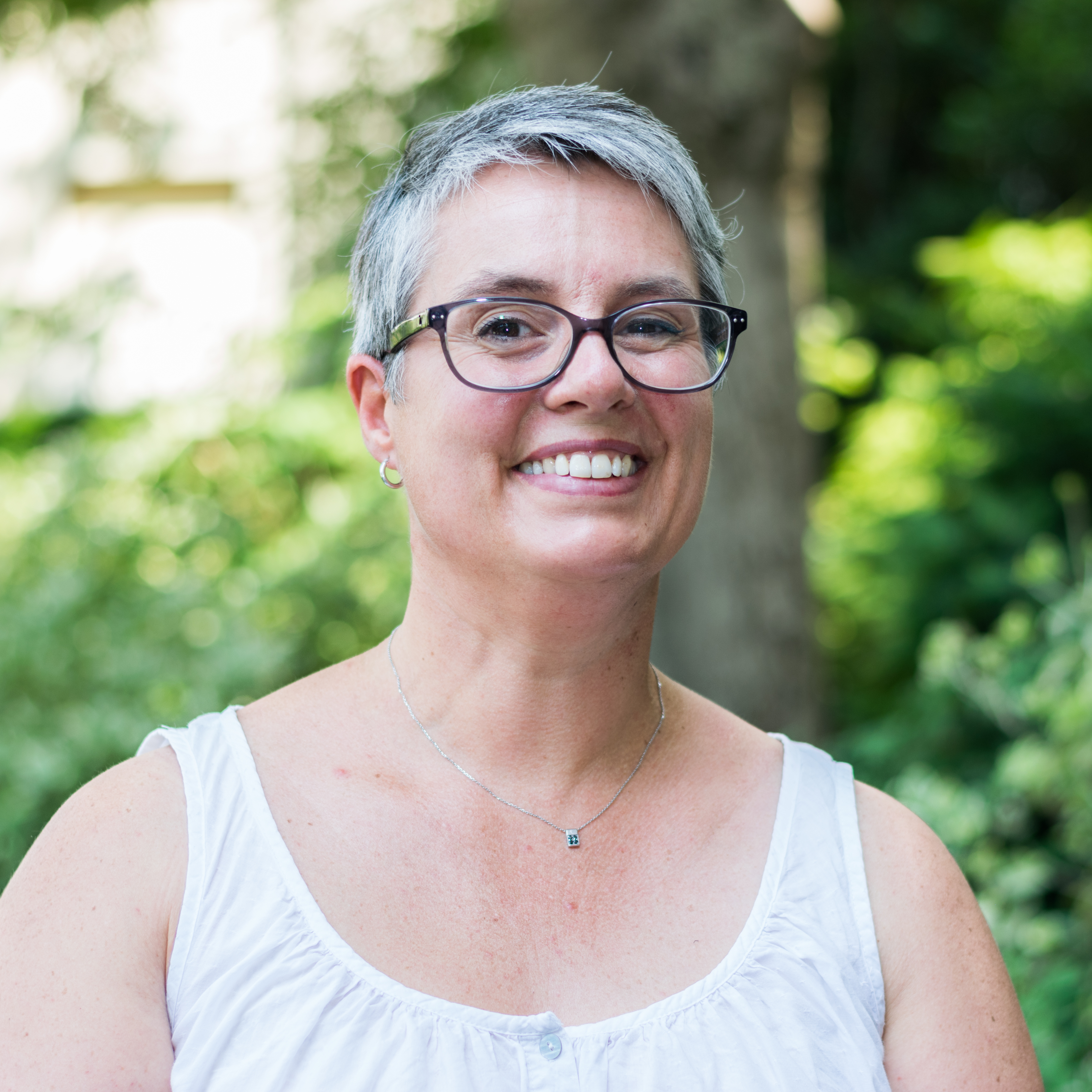

Member of the National Assembly for Rhône's 4th constituency
- In office 21 June 2017 – 9 June 2024
- Preceded by: Dominique Nachury
- Succeeded by: Sandrine Runel

Personal details
- Born: 28 November 1970 (age 54); Versailles, France
- Political party: Socialist Party (2002–2017); La République En Marche! (2017–present); Territories of Progress (2020–present)
- Education: École nationale supérieure d'agronomie et des industries alimentaires

Anne Brugnera (born 28 November 1970) is a French politician of La République En Marche! (LREM) and Territories of Progress (TDP) who has been serving as a member of the National Assembly since the 2017 elections, representing the department of Rhône.

== Political career ==
In parliament, Brugnera serves on the Committee on Cultural Affairs and Education, where she was her parliamentary group's coordinator from 2017 until 2019. In this capacity, she is the parliament's rapporteur on the reconstruction of Notre-Dame de Paris. In 2020, Brugnera joined Territoires de Progrès, a group within LREM created by Jean-Yves Le Drian and Olivier Dussopt.

In July 2019, Brugnera voted in favor of the French ratification of the European Union’s Comprehensive Economic and Trade Agreement (CETA) with Canada.

She was re-elected in the 2022 election.

== See also ==
- 2017 French legislative election
- 2022 French legislative election
