= Yoann Gillet =

French politician (born 1986)

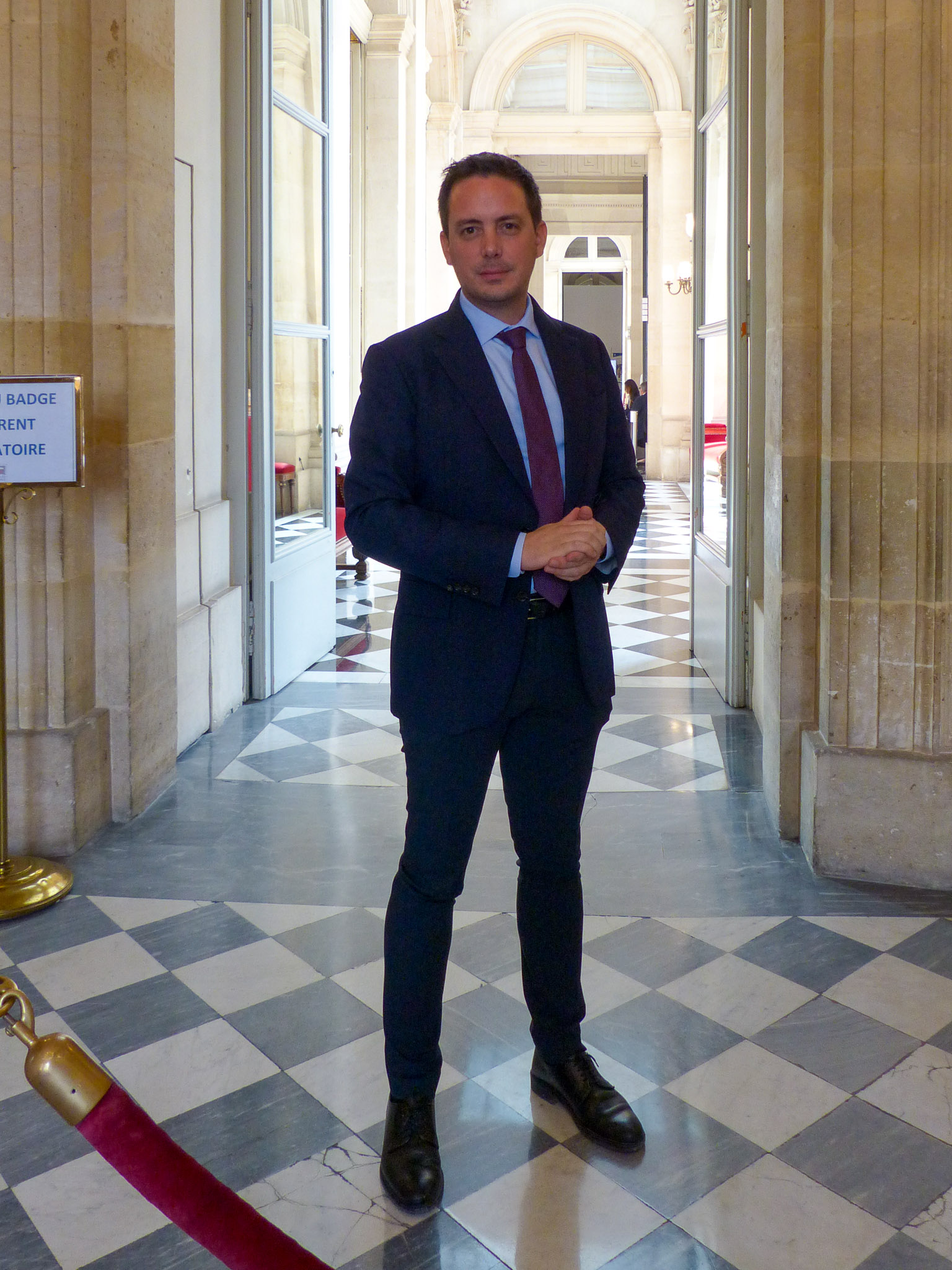

Member of the National Assembly for Gard's 1st constituency
- Incumbent
- Assumed office 22 June 2022
- Preceded by: Françoise Dumas

Member of the Regional Council of Occitania
- Incumbent
- Assumed office 4 January 2016
- President: Carole Delga

Personal details
- Born: 29 August 1986 (age 39) Rennes, France
- Party: National Rally (2008–present)
- Other political affiliations: UMP (until 2007)
- Occupation: Civil servant

Yoann Gillet (French pronunciation: [jɔan ʒilɛ]; born 29 August 1986) is a French politician who was elected the deputy in the National Assembly for the 1st constituency of Gard in the 2022 legislative election. A member of the National Rally (RN), he was also elected to the Regional Council of Occitania in 2015.

== Biography ==
Gillet grew up in Touraine before settling in Caen. He worked as a civil servant before becoming a politician. He became active in the Union for a Popular Movement (UMP) as a teenager but left the party in 2007 citing his disappointment with Nicolas Sarkozy. However, the local UMP branch claimed to have expelled Gillet after he endorsed a deputy mayoral candidate in Caen who was not a member of the party. Gillet joined the French National Front (now National Rally) the following year.

After moving to Gard he worked for Julien Sanchez's mayoral campaign and was elected as a municipal councilor for the RN in Nîmes in 2014. In 2015, he was elected as a regional councilor in Occitanie and became the party secretary and leader for the RN in the region. In 2020, he stood for mayor of Nîmes and finished in second place.

During the 2017 French legislative election, he stood in Gard's 1st constituency but was beaten in the final round by LREM candidate Françoise Dumas. He stood in the same constituency in the 2022 election and was successful at winning the seat.

In 2022, Gillet was appointed head of the RN federation in Gard after Gilbert Collard left the party.

In 2019, Gillet was a victim of physical assault by two men. According to Gillet's statement, the attackers had presented themselves as members of ANTIFA and had given him insults and death threats while he was sitting at an outside table at a bar before returning to physically attack him, including burning a cigarette against his face. The police indicated that the men were not found to belong to any group but were charged with aggravated assault and for assaulting six other people along with two other suspects. The attack was condemned by Secretary of State Marlène Schiappa.
