= National Defence and Armed Forces Committee =

Standing committee of the French National Assembly

The National Defence and Armed Forces Committee (French: Commission de la Défense nationale et des Forces armées) is one of the eight standing committees of the French National Assembly.

== Chairwoman ==
- Françoise Dumas - 15th legislature of the French Fifth Republic
