= Pierre Venteau =

French politician

Member of the National Assembly for Haute-Vienne's 2nd constituency
- In office 4 October 2019 – 20 June 2022
- Preceded by: Jean-Baptiste Djebbari
- Succeeded by: Stéphane Delautrette

Personal details
- Born: 26 August 1974 (age 51) Saint-Yrieix-la-Perche, Haute-Vienne, France
- Party: LREM (Territories of Progress)

Pierre Venteau (born 26 August 1974) is a French politician of La République En Marche! (LREM) who was member of the National Assembly from 2019 to 2022, representing Haute-Vienne's 2nd constituency. As his substitute, he replaced Jean-Baptiste Djebbari in Parliament when he was appointed Minister for Transport in the Second Philippe government.
