= Rhône's 4th constituency =

Constituency of the National Assembly of France

4th constituency of Rhône
- inline Constituency of the National Assembly of France

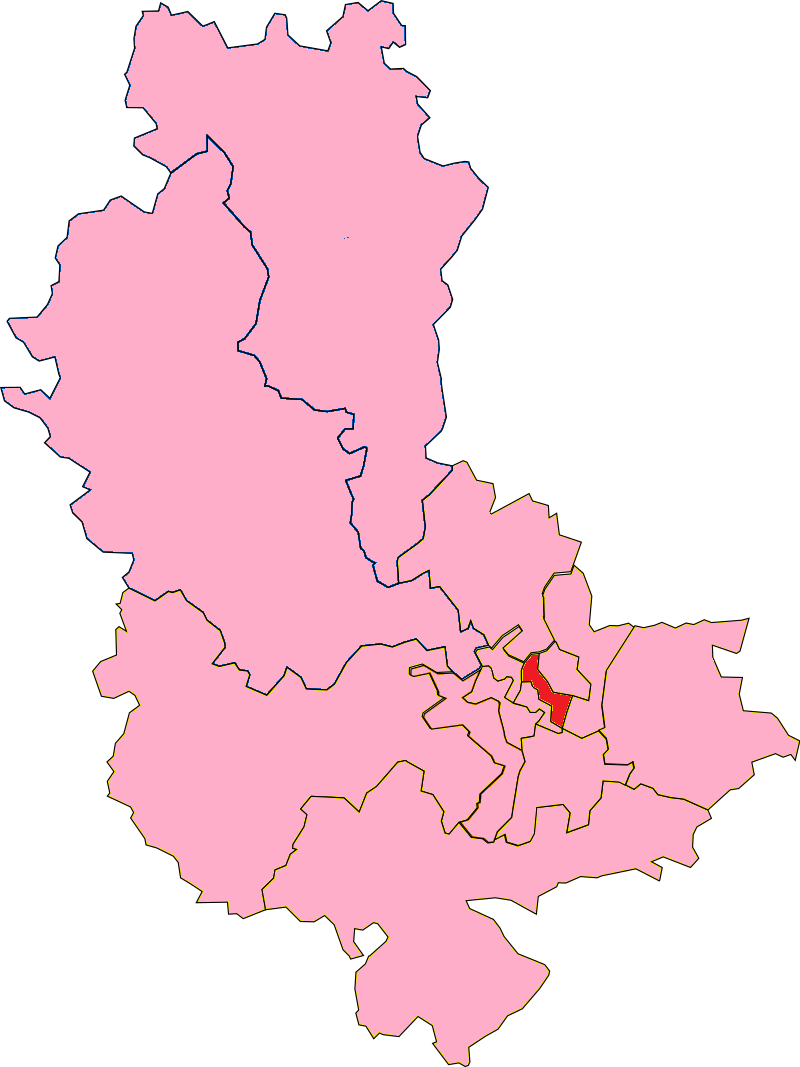
- Rhône's's 4th Constituency shown within Rhône
- Deputy: Sandrine Runel; PS
- Department: Rhône
- Cantons: Lyon VI, Lyon VII, Lyon XI, Lyon XIII, Lyon XIV [part]
- Registered voters: 80169

The 4th constituency of the Rhône (French: Troisième circonscription du Rhône) is a French legislative constituency in the Rhône département. Like the other 576 French constituencies, it elects one MP using a two round electoral system.

== Description ==
The 4th constituency of the Rhône includes parts of Lyon to the east of the city centre. Since 2015 this constituency has been part of the Lyon Metropolis and therefore outside of the Rhône for administrative purposes.

Until 2017 the voters in the 4th had consistently supported candidates from the centre right including former Prime Minister and presidential candidate Raymond Barre.

== Assembly Members ==
Election	Member	Party
1988	Raymond Barre	UDF
1993	Raymond Barre	UDF
1997	Raymond Barre	UDF
2002	Christian Philip	UMP
2007	Dominique Perben	UMP
2012	Dominique Nachury	UMP
2017	Anne Brugnera	LREM
2022	Anne Brugnera	LREM
2024	Sandrine Runel	PS

== Election results ==
=== 2024 ===
Legislative Election 2024: Rhône's 4th constituency
Party	Candidate	Votes	%	±%
PS (NFP)	Sandrine Runel	22,959	38.00	+6.28
RE (Ensemble)	Anne Brugnera	18,744	31.03	-2.07
RN	Yannick Chaumont	10,818	17.91	+10.68
LR	Romain Billard	6,267	10.37	−6.12
REC	Armande Torrent	655	1.08	−5.47
DVE	Julien Quevy	496	0.82	−1.30
LO	Coralie Laurent	329	0.54	N/A
DIV	Juliette Vel	143	0.24	N/A
DIV	Tristan Jego	0	0	N/A
Turnout		60,418	76.58	+17.52
Registered electors		78,898		
2nd round result
PS	Sandrine Runel	24,852	42.48	+4.48
RE	Anne Brugnera	23,208	39.67	+8.65
RN	Yannick Chaumont	10,449	17.86	−0.05
Turnout		58,509	74.15	+18.18
Registered electors		78,903		
PS gain from RE				

=== 2022 ===
Legislative Election 2022: Rhone's 4th constituency
Party	Candidate	Votes	%	±%
LREM (Ensemble)	Anne Brugnera	15,566	34.10	-11.69
EELV (NUPÉS)	Benjamin Badouard	14,479	31.72	+11.98
LR (UDC)	Pascal Blache	7,530	16.49	−5.52
RN	Véronique Coulais	3,300	7.23	−1.67
REC	Florence Darbon	2,989	6.55	N/A
DVE	Nadia Kebir	970	2.12	N/A
Others	N/A	818	-	−
Turnout		45,652	59.06	+4.85
2nd round result
LREM (Ensemble)	Anne Brugnera	24,338	59.13	-1.42
EELV (NUPÉS)	Benjamin Badouard	16,824	40.87	N/A
Turnout		41,162	55.97	+14.58
LREM hold				

=== 2017 ===
Legislative Election 2017: Rhône's 4th constituency
Party	Candidate	Votes	%	±%
LREM	Anne Brugnera	19,902	45.79	
LR	Dominique Nachury	9,565	22.01	
LFI	Anne Fontenille	4,693	10.80	
EELV	Véronique Dubois Bertrand	3,215	7.40	
FN	Edith Godecke	2,415	5.56	
Others	N/A	3,673		
Turnout		43,364	54.21	
2nd round result
LREM	Anne Brugnera	20,095	60.55	
LR	Dominique Nachury	13,090	39.45	
Turnout		33,185	41.39	
LREM gain from LR				

=== 2012 ===
Legislative Election 2012: Rhône's 4th constituency
Party	Candidate	Votes	%	±%
UMP	Dominique Nachury	17,355	37.97	
PS	Anne Brugnera	14,862	32.51	
FN	Nicole Hugon	4,461	9.76	
EELV	Pierre Hemon	2,427	5.31	
FG	Pierre-Yves Besseas	2,214	4.84	
DVD	Thierry Mouillac	1,360	2.98	
MoDem	Bertrand Picolet	1,273	2.78	
Others	N/A	1,760		
Turnout		45,712	57.48	
2nd round result
UMP	Dominique Nachury	22,968	53.24	
PS	Anne Brugnera	20,173	46.76	
Turnout		43,131	54.25	
UMP hold				

=== 2007 ===
Legislative Election 2007: Rhône's 4th constituency
Party	Candidate	Votes	%	±%
UMP	Dominique Perben	22,088	47.94	
PS	Najat Vallaud-Belkacem	11,571	25.11	
MoDem	Anne-Sophie Condemine	6,311	13.70	
FN	Claudine Gracien	1,688	3.66	
LV	Patrick Odiard	1,340	2.91	
Others	N/A	3,077		
Turnout		46,502	61.95	
2nd round result
UMP	Dominique Perben	23,717	56.57	
PS	Najat Vallaud-Belkacem	18,210	43.43	
Turnout		43,153	57.49	
UMP hold				

=== 2002 ===
Legislative Election 2002: Rhône's 4th constituency
Party	Candidate	Votes	%	±%
UMP	Christian Philip	16,472	37.43	
LV	Pierre Hemon	11,217	25.49	
DVD	Nicole Chevassus	7,814	17.76	
FN	Claudine Gracien	4,375	9.94	
Others	N/A	4,124		
Turnout		44,547	69.88	
2nd round result
UMP	Christian Philip	24,280	64.49	
LV	Pierre Hemon	13,371	35.51	
Turnout		38,884	60.99	
UMP gain from UDF				

=== 1997 ===
Legislative Election 1997: Rhône's 4th constituency
Party	Candidate	Votes	%	±%
UDF	Raymond Barre	16,888	43.15	
PS	Martine Roure	8,236	21.04	
FN	René Morel	6,213	15.87	
DVD	Patrick Louis	1,703	4.35	
MRC	Joseph Guetaz	1,621	4.14	
LO	Georges Mestres	1,080	2.76	
LV	Pierre Gandonniere	936	2.39	
GE	Michel Chomarat	863	2.20	
Others	N/A	1,599		
Turnout		40,344	65.33	
2nd round result
UDF	Raymond Barre	24,962	62.82	
PS	Martine Roure	14,772	37.18	
Turnout		41,620	67.40	
UDF hold				
