= Jean-Pierre Pénicaut =

French politician (1937–2021)

Jean-Pierre Pénicaut (1 August 1937 – 26 September 2021) was a French politician.

Pénicaut was born in Amou, Landes, and began his political career as a municipal councilor in Saint-Paul-lès-Dax. After the death of incumbent Henri Lavielle, he assumed the mayoralty, which he held until 2001. He served on the National Assembly from 1980 to 1993, representing Landes's 2nd constituency on behalf of the Socialist Party.
