= Haute-Vienne's 2nd constituency =

Constituency of the National Assembly of France

2nd constituency of Haute-Vienne
- inline Constituency of the National Assembly of France

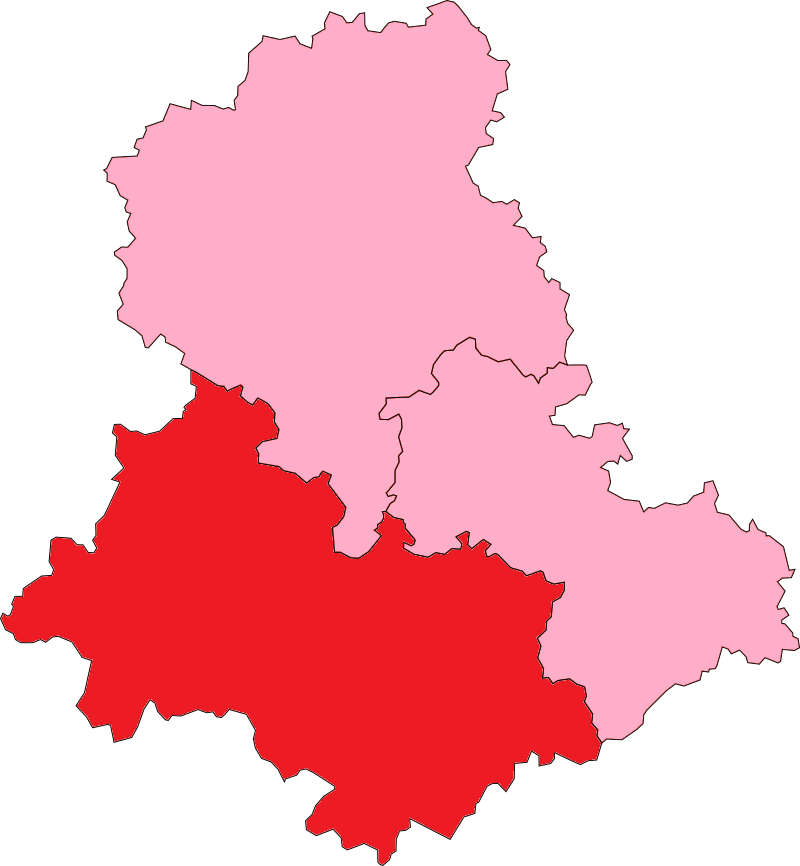
- Haute-Vienne's 2nd Constituency shown within Haute-Vienne
- Deputy: Stéphane Delautrette; PS
- Department: Haute-Vienne
- Cantons: Aixe-sur-Vienne, Châlus, Limoges-Condat, Limoges-Emailleurs, Nexon, Oradour-sur-Vayres, Pierre-Buffière, Rochechouart, Saint-Germain-les-Belles, Saint-Junien Est, Saint-Junien Ouest, Saint-Laurent-sur-Gorre, Saint-Mathieu, Saint-Yrieix-la-Perche
- Registered voters: 97461

The 2nd constituency of Haute-Vienne (French: Deuxième circonscription de la Haute-Vienne) is a French legislative constituency in the Haute-Vienne département. Like the other 576 French constituencies, it elects one MP using a two round electoral system.

== Description ==
The 2nd Constituency of Haute-Vienne covers the south west portion of the Department and includes some of the city of Limoges. Historically the constituency leaned towards the centre-left. Daniel Boisserie of the Socialist Party represented the seat for twenty years between 1997 and 2007. His successor as PS candidate secured only 10.7% of the first round vote at the 2017 election coming fifth.

== Assembly Members ==
Election	Member	Party
1988	Jean-Claude Peyronnet	PS
1993	Evelyne Guilhem	RPR
1997	Daniel Boisserie	PS
2002	Daniel Boisserie	PS
2007	Daniel Boisserie	PS
2012	Daniel Boisserie	PS
2017	Jean-Baptiste Djebbari	LREM
2019	Pierre Venteau	LREM
2022	Stéphane Delautrette	PS

== Election results ==
=== 2024 ===
Candidate	Party	Alliance	First round		Second round	
Candidate	Party	Alliance	Votes	%	Votes	%
Stéphane Delautrette	PS	Ensemble	25,520	36.83	36,679	56.06
Sabrina Minguet	RN		25,539	36.86	28,751	43.94
Marie-Eve Tayot	DVC	Ensemble	16,937	24.45		
Claudine Roussie	LO		1,290	1.86		
Valid votes			69,286	95.35	65,430	90.23
Blank votes			1,875	2.58	4,543	6.26
Null votes			1,502	2.07	2,543	3.51
Turnout			72,663	73.89	72,516	73.73
Abstentions			25,675	36.11	25,835	26.27
Registered voters			98,338		98,351	
Result			PS HOLD			

=== 2022 ===
Legislative Election 2022: Haute-Vienne's 2nd constituency
Party	Candidate	Votes	%	±%
PS (NUPÉS)	Stéphane Delautrette	18,381	35.58	-2.15
RN	Sabrina Minguet	10,244	19.83	+9.81
MoDem (Ensemble)	Shérazade Zaiter	7,957	15.40	−20.35
LREM	Jean-Luc Bonnet*	6,080	11.77	N/A
LR (UDC)	Jean Marie Bost	3,962	7.67	−3.39
REC	Gisèle Carre	1,920	3.72	N/A
FGR	Daniel Gendarme	1,551	3.00	N/A
Others	N/A	1,568	3.04	
Turnout		51,663	54.80	−0.94
2nd round result
PS (NUPÉS)	Stéphane Delautrette	26,730	61.47	+16.06
RN	Sabrina Minguet	16,757	38.53	N/A
Turnout		43,487	52.44	+6.94
PS gain from LREM				

* LREM dissident

=== 2017 ===
Legislative Election 2017: Haute-Vienne's 2nd constituency
Party	Candidate	Votes	%	±%
LREM	Jean-Baptiste Djebbari-Bonnet	19,424	35.75	
PCF	Pierre Allard	6,648	12.24	
LFI	Hubert Hurard	6,366	11.72	
UDI	Vincent Leonie	6,011	11.06	
PS	Annick Morizio	5,827	10.73	
FN	Joëlle Crepet	5,444	10.02	
EELV	Lucien Coindeau	1,653	3.04	
Others	N/A	2,953		
Turnout		54,326	55.74	
2nd round result
LREM	Jean-Baptiste Djebbari-Bonnet	24,209	54.59	
PCF	Pierre Allard	20,139	45.41	
Turnout		44,348	45.50	
LREM gain from PS				

=== 2012 ===
Legislative Election 2012: Haute-Vienne's 2nd constituency
Party	Candidate	Votes	%	±%
PS	Daniel Boisserie	28,844	47.96	
UMP	Frédérick Peyronnet	12,377	20.58	
FN	Yannick Vidaud	7,036	11.70	
FG	Marie-José Dumasdelage	6,925	11.51	
EELV	Marie Labat	2,171	3.61	
MoDem	Christophe Lechevallier	1,701	2.83	
Others	N/A	1,094		
Turnout		60,148	62.21	
2nd round result
PS	Daniel Boisserie	37,965	68.71	
UMP	Frédérick Peyronnet	17,291	31.29	
Turnout		55,256	57.16	
PS hold				

=== 2007 ===
Legislative Election 2007: Haute-Vienne's 2nd constituency
Party	Candidate	Votes	%	±%
PS	Daniel Boisserie	17,039	33.82	
UMP	Evelyne Guilhem	15,911	31.58	
DVG	Pierre Allard	8,327	16.53	
MoDem	Christophe Lechevallier	1,853	3.68	
Far left	Catherine Guerry	1,461	2.90	
FN	Jean-Luc Riviere	1,282	2.54	
LV	Alain Dorange	1,140	2.26	
Others	N/A	3,373		
Turnout		51,934	70.18	
2nd round result
PS	Daniel Boisserie	30,149	60.89	
UMP	Evelyne Guilhem	19,364	39.11	
Turnout		51,953	70.20	
PS hold				

=== 2002 ===
Legislative Election 2002: Haute-Vienne's 2nd constituency
Party	Candidate	Votes	%	±%
PS	Daniel Boisserie	18,997	36.83	
UMP	Evelyne Guilhem	18,586	36.03	
PCF	Lucien Dussouchaud	5,030	9.75	
FN	Yves Guieau	3,043	5.90	
CPNT	Marc Wasilewski	1,414	2.74	
LV	Marie-Christine Guerineau	1,340	2.60	
LCR	Josiane Reveyrand	1,137	2.20	
Others	N/A	2,038		
Turnout		53,553	73.75	
2nd round result
PS	Daniel Boisserie	27,576	54.64	
UMP	Evelyne Guilhem	22,896	45.36	
Turnout		52,858	72.80	
PS hold				

=== 1997 ===
Legislative Election 1997: Haute-Vienne's 2nd constituency
Party	Candidate	Votes	%	±%
PS	Daniel Boisserie	16,835	32.58	
RPR	Evelyne Guilhem	15,860	30.70	
Far left	Lucien Dussouchaud	9,888	19.14	
FN	Jean Fredon	3,331	6.45	
LV	Jean Daniel	1,724	3.34	
LO	Marie-Thérèse Coinaud	1,461	2.83	
Others	N/A	2,569		
Turnout		55,067	77.54	
2nd round result
PS	Daniel Boisserie	31,960	58.89	
RPR	Evelyne Guilhem	22,307	41.11	
Turnout		57,553	81.05	
PS gain from RPR				
