= Michel Destot =

French politician (1946–2026)

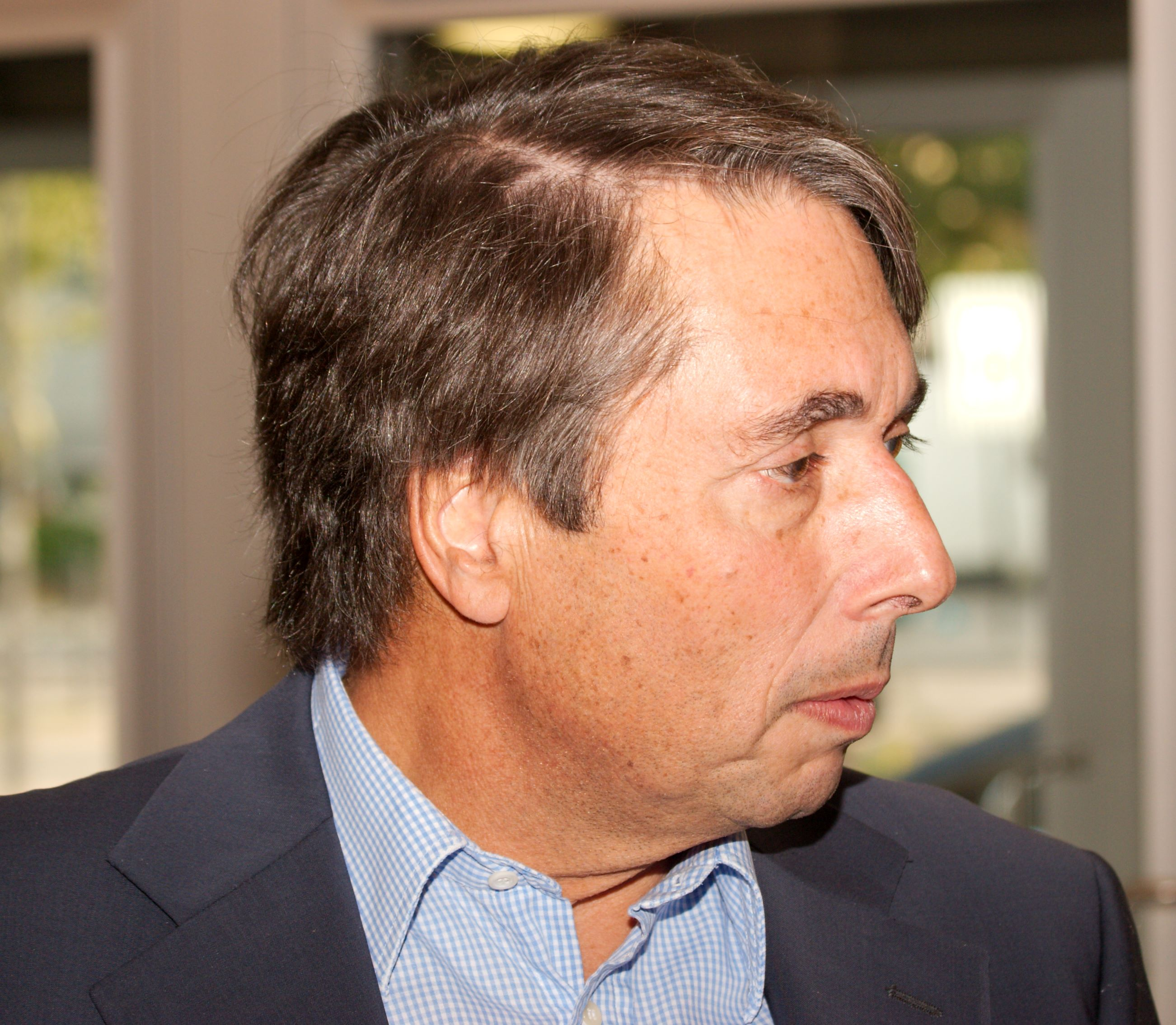
- Destot in 2008

Mayor of Grenoble
- In office 1995–2014
- Preceded by: Alain Carignon
- Succeeded by: Éric Piolle

Member of the National Assembly for Isère's 3rd constituency
- In office 1988–2017
- Succeeded by: Émilie Chalas

Personal details
- Born: 2 September 1946 Malo-les-Bains, France
- Died: 14 November 2026 (aged 80)
- Party: Socialist Party
- Education: Arts et Métiers ParisTech

Michel Destot (French: [miʃɛl desto]; 2 September 1946 – 14 November 2026) was a French politician who was a member of the National Assembly of France. He represented the Isère department, and was a member of the Socialiste, radical, citoyen et divers gauche. Destot was the mayor of Grenoble between 1995 and 2014, when his chosen successor was defeated by Éric Piolle. He died on 14 November 2026, at the age of 80.
