= Barlin, Pas-de-Calais =

Barlin
- Commune
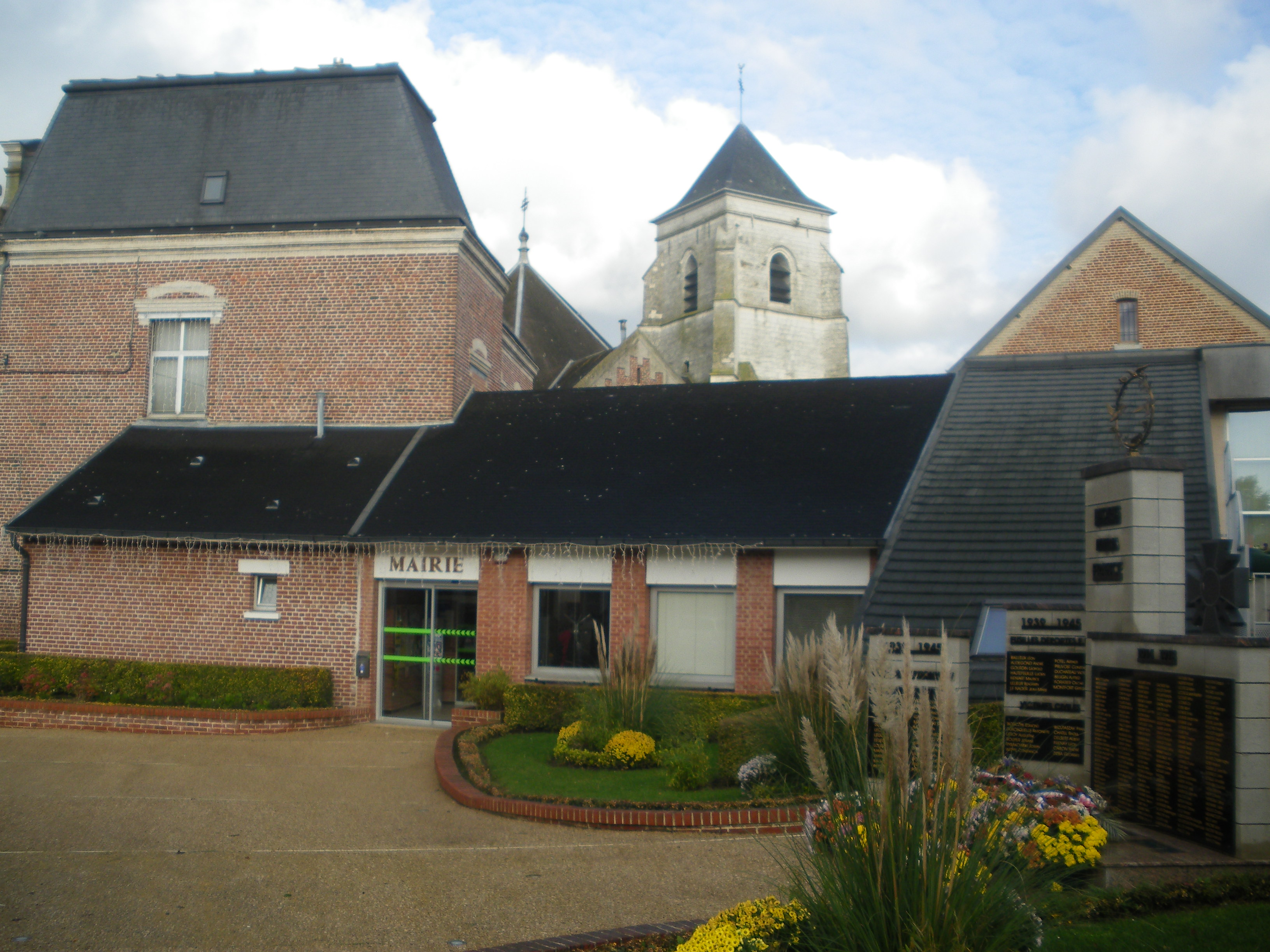
- The town hall of Barlin

- Coat of arms
- Location of Barlin
- Location within France Location within Hauts-de-France
- Coordinates: 50°27′21″N 2°37′10″E
- Country: France
- Region: Hauts-de-France
- Department: Pas-de-Calais
- Arrondissement: Béthune
- Canton: Nœux-les-Mines
- Intercommunality: CA Béthune-Bruay, Artois-Lys Romane

Government
  - Mayor (2020–2026): Julien Dagbert
- Area^{1}: 6.18 km^{2} (2.39 sq mi)
- Elevation: 63 m (207 ft)
- Highest elevation: 131 m (430 ft)
- Lowest elevation: 51 m (167 ft)
- Population (2023): 7,331
  - Density: 1,190/km^{2} (3,070/sq mi)
- Time zone: UTC+01:00 (CET)
  - Summer (DST): UTC+02:00 (CEST)
- INSEE/Postal code: 62083 /62620
- ^{1} French Land Register data, which excludes lakes, ponds, glaciers > 1 km^{2} (0.386 sq mi or 247 acres) and river estuaries.

Barlin (French pronunciation: [baʁlɛ̃]) is a commune in the Pas-de-Calais department in the Hauts-de-France region in northern France.

== Geography ==
A small ex-coal mining town, now a light engineering and farming commune, Barlin is situated 7 miles (11 km) south of Béthune and 30 miles (48 km) southwest of Lille, at the junction of the D57, D179 and the D188 roads.

== History ==
Barlin dates to at least 1141, the year of the first mention of the parish of Barlin in a manuscript now kept in the National Archives. It was then spelt Ballin or Bellin. The name changed several times over the centuries, being recorded as Ballin in 1141, Bellin in 1438 and Barlaing in 1556; it was not until the next century that it became Barlin.

In the 12th century, the territory of Barlin was divided into several lordships that depended on Saint-Pol-sur-Ternoise, Arras or Béthune. In 1207, Thomas Hasbare was seigneur of Barlin. The Melun family succeeded him and one of their lords, nicknamed Le Brun, the king's chamberlain, saw his property confiscated by Duke John the Fearless, who had accused him of allegiance with his enemies. The Duke of Burgundy then donated the land and income of Barlin to Walleran de Juhaucourt.

In the mid-nineteenth century, coalmining began at Barlin, and the town flourished. Its mines closed in the 1960s.

Barlin has several schools, a secondary school (Collège Jean Moulin), a swimming pool (Le Nautilud), a media library, and several sports facilities.

== Population ==
Historical population
Year	Pop.	±% p.a.
1968	8,907	—
1975	8,007	−1.51%
1982	7,831	−0.32%
1990	7,948	+0.19%
1999	7,925	−0.03%
2007	7,619	−0.49%
2012	7,567	−0.14%
2017	7,661	+0.25%
2023	7,331	−0.73%
Source: INSEE

== Sights ==
- The church of St. Pierre, dating from the eighteenth century
- The Commonwealth War Graves Commission cemetery
- The museum

== See also ==
- Communes of the Pas-de-Calais department
