= Daniel Boisserie =

French politician

Daniel Boisserie (born 8 June 1946) was a member of the National Assembly of France. He represented the 2nd constituency of the Haute-Vienne department from 1997 to 2012, and was a member of the Socialiste, radical, citoyen et divers gauche.
