= Plumelin =

Commune in Brittany, France

Plumelin Pluverin
- Commune
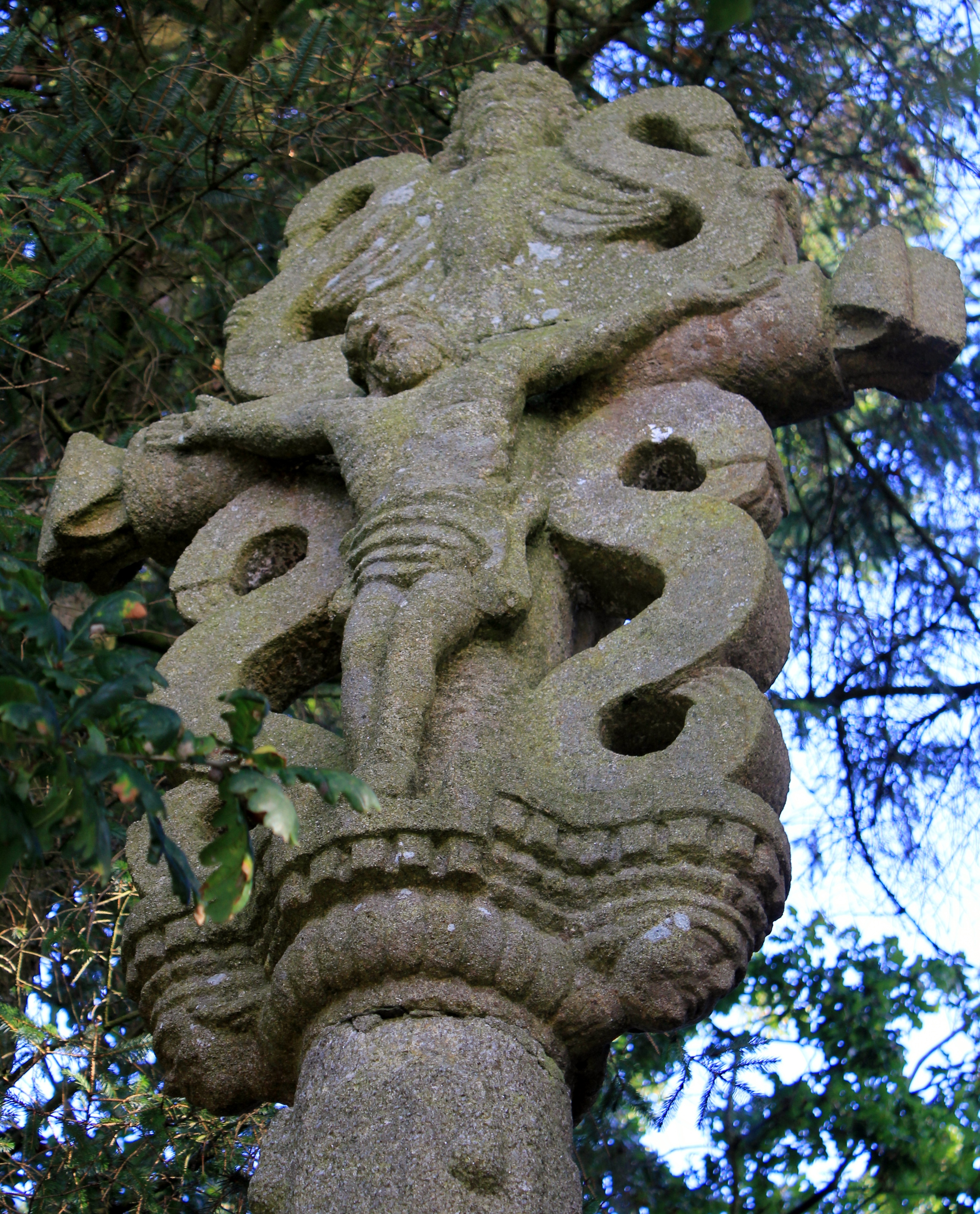
- The Cross of Kercloarec

- Coat of arms
- Location of Plumelin
- Location within France Location within Brittany
- Coordinates: 47°51′45″N 2°53′12″W
- Country: France
- Region: Brittany
- Department: Morbihan
- Arrondissement: Pontivy
- Canton: Grand-Champ
- Intercommunality: Centre Morbihan Communauté

Government
  - Mayor (2026–32): Pierre Guegan
- Area^{1}: 31.33 km^{2} (12.10 sq mi)
- Highest elevation: 153 m (502 ft)
- Lowest elevation: 42 m (138 ft)
- Population (2023): 2,885
  - Density: 92.08/km^{2} (238.5/sq mi)
- Time zone: UTC+01:00 (CET)
  - Summer (DST): UTC+02:00 (CEST)
- INSEE/Postal code: 56174 /56500
- ^{1} French Land Register data, which excludes lakes, ponds, glaciers > 1 km^{2} (0.386 sq mi or 247 acres) and river estuaries.

Plumelin (French pronunciation: [plymlɛ̃]; Breton: Pluverin) is a commune in the Morbihan department of Brittany in north-western France.

== Population ==
Historical population
Year	Pop.	±% p.a.
1968	1,864	—
1975	1,715	−1.18%
1982	1,809	+0.77%
1990	1,748	−0.43%
1999	1,785	+0.23%
2007	2,295	+3.19%
2012	2,641	+2.85%
2017	2,723	+0.61%
2023	2,885	+0.97%
Source: INSEE

Inhabitants of Plumelin are called in French Plumelinois.

== Breton language ==
In 2008, there was 20.61% of the children attended the bilingual schools in primary education.

== See also ==
- Communes of the Morbihan department
