= Martine Roure =

French politician and Member of the European Parliament (born 1948)

Martine Roure (born 28 September 1948, in Lyon) is a French politician and Member of the European Parliament for the south-east of France. She is a member of the Socialist Party, which is part of the Party of European Socialists, and sits on the European Parliament's Committee on Civil Liberties, Justice and Home Affairs.

She is also vice-chair of the delegation for relations with the People's Republic of China, and a substitute for the Committee on Budgets.

She was Secretary of local Socialist Party association from 1985 to 1989. She was a Member of the Socialist Party executive committee and national council from 1992 to 1996 and has been a Member of the European Parliament since 1999.

== Honors and awards ==
Knight (1992) and Officer (1999) of the Order of Academic Palms
