= Morbihan's 3rd constituency =

Constituency of the National Assembly of France

3rd constituency of Morbihan
- inline Constituency of the National Assembly of France

- Constituency in Department

- Location of Morbihan in France
- Deputy: Nicole Le Peih; RE
- Department: Morbihan
- Cantons: (pre-2015) Baud, Elven, Grand-Champ, Locminé, Pontivy, Rohan, Saint-Jean-Brévelay

The 3rd constituency of Morbihan is a French legislative constituency in the Morbihan département. Like the other 576 French constituencies, it elects one MP using the two-round system, with a run-off if no candidate receives over 50% of the vote in the first round.

== Historic representation ==
Election	Member	Party
1988	Jean-Charles Cavaillé	RPR
1993	Jean-Charles Cavaillé	RPR
1997	Jean-Charles Cavaillé	RPR
2002	Gérard Lorgeoux	UMP
2007	Gérard Lorgeoux	UMP
2012	Jean-Pierre Le Roch	PS
2017	Nicole Le Peih	LREM
2022	Nicole Le Peih	RE
2024	Nicole Le Peih	RE

== Election results ==
=== 2024 ===
Legislative Election 2024: Morbihan's 3rd constituency
Party	Candidate	Votes	%	±%
LFI (NFP)	Marie Madeleine Doré-Lucas	13,999	20.41	N/A
REG	Jocelyne Devriendt	1,078	1.57	N/A
DVE	Lionel Epaillard	943	1.38	N/A
LR	Soizic Perrault	8,340	12.16	−4.84
RE (Ensemble)	Nicole Le Peih	18,222	26.57	−2.56
RN	Antoine Oliviero	24,584	35.85	+17.12
LO	Julie Lepert	688	1.00	N/A
DLF	Julie Cuciniello	719	1.05	N/A
Turnout		68,573	97.25	+46.60
Registered electors		98,154		
2nd round result
RE	Nicole Le Peih	37,776	57.56	+30.99
RN	Antoine Oliviero	27,854	42.44	+6.59
Turnout		65,630	93.97	−3.28
Registered electors		98,156		
RE hold		Swing		

=== 2022 ===
Legislative Election 2022: Morbihan's 3rd constituency
Party	Candidate	Votes	%	±%
LREM (Ensemble)	Nicole Le Peih	13,902	29.13	-12.17
LFI (NUPÉS)	Marie Madeleine Dore-Lucas	10,744	22.51	+3.44
RN	Alice Gohin	8,938	18.73	+7.75
LR (UDC)	Benoît Quero	8,113	17.00	−5.44
REC	Regis Le Gall	1,414	2.96	N/A
DVG	Lionel Guy Marie Epaillard	1,281	2.68	N/A
Others	N/A	3,330	6.98	
Turnout		47,722	50.65	−4.01
2nd round result
LREM (Ensemble)	Nicole Le Peih	24,283	56.64	-9.46
LFI (NUPÉS)	Marie Madeleine Dore-Lucas	18,588	43.36	+9.46
Turnout		42,871	48.82	+4.14
LREM hold				

=== 2017 ===
Candidate	Label	First round		Second round	
Candidate	Label	Votes	%	Votes	%
Nicole Le Peih	REM	19,966	41.30	24,064	66.10
Marie-Madeleine Doré-Lucas	FI	5,723	11.84	12,340	33.90
Soizic Perrault	LR	5,537	11.45		
Benoît Rolland	UDI	5,313	10.99		
Sylvie Baud	FN	5,308	10.98		
Marie-Christine Le Mouël	PS	1,840	3.81		
Patrick Naizain	ECO	1,653	3.42		
Anne Sorel	REG	752	1.56		
Jérôme Bouché	DLF	677	1.40		
Jean-Luc Jacquin	REG	537	1.11		
Christelle Jarny	EXG	406	0.84		
Alain Lyon	EXD	385	0.80		
Éric Le Pendu	DIV	250	0.52		
Votes		48,347	100.00	36,404	100.00
Valid votes		48,347	97.44	36,404	89.76
Blank votes		859	1.73	2,577	6.35
Null votes		410	0.83	1,576	3.89
Turnout		49,616	54.66	40,557	44.68
Abstentions		41,163	45.34	50,225	55.32
Registered voters		90,779		90,782	
Source: Ministry of the Interior

=== 2012 ===
Legislative Election 2012: Morbihan's 3rd constituency
Party	Candidate	Votes	%	±%
PS	Jean-Pierre Le Roch	21,879	40.86	+9.58
UMP	Yves Bleunven	20,199	37.72	−8.15
FN	Gisèle Burban	5,719	10.68	+7.26
FG	Christian Daniel	2,765	5.16	+2.59
EELV	André Locussol	1,751	3.27	N/A
Others	N/A	1,234	-	−
Turnout		53,547	61.71	−4.25
2nd round result
PS	Jean-Pierre Le Roch	28,214	52.94	+5.98
UMP	Yves Bleunven	25,077	47.06	−5.98
Turnout		53,291	61.42	−2.57
PS gain from UMP				

=== 2007 ===
Legislative Election 2007: Morbihan's 3rd constituency
Party	Candidate	Votes	%	±%
UMP	Gérard Lorgeoux	24,737	45.87	−0.61
PS	Jean-Pierre Le Roch	16,866	31.28	−0.91
MoDem	Benoit Rolland	4,111	7.62	N/A
DVG	Nelly Fruchard	2,290	4.25	N/A
FN	Gisèle Burban	1,846	3.42	−3.87
PCF	Marie-Madeleine Dore-Lucas	1,387	2.57	−0.64
Others	N/A	2,687	-	−
Turnout		54,983	65.96	−3.23
2nd round result
UMP	Gérard Lorgeoux	27,523	53.04	−3.46
PS	Jean-Pierre Le Roch	24,365	46.96	+3.46
Turnout		53,337	63.99	−1.64
UMP hold				

=== 2002 ===
Legislative Election 2002: Morbihan's 3rd constituency
Party	Candidate	Votes	%	±%
UMP	Gérard Lorgeoux	24,313	46.48	+0.27
PS	Jean-Pierre Le Roch	16,837	32.19	+3.41
FN	Claude Guillaume	3,815	7.29	−2.11
PCF	Jean-Paul Jarno	1,678	3.21	−4.32
LV	Guy Collet	1,128	2.16	N/A
CPNT	Ludovic Pendeliau	1,103	2.11	N/A
Others	N/A	3,429	-	−
Turnout		53,538	69.19	−4.77
2nd round result
UMP	Gérard Lorgeoux	27,979	56.50	+1.57
PS	Jean-Pierre Le Roch	21,537	43.50	−1.57
Turnout		50,965	65.63	−8.81
UMP hold				

=== 1997 ===
Legislative Election 1997: Morbihan's 3rd constituency
Party	Candidate	Votes	%	±%
RPR	Jean-Charles Cavaillé	23,714	46.75	
PS	Jean-Pierre Le Roch	14,602	28.78	
FN	Georges Iglesias-Melich	4,767	9.40	
PCF	Jean-Paul Jamo	3,818	7.53	
GE	Daniela Bourbon	2,631	5.19	
REG	Richard Gironnay	1,197	2.36	
Turnout		53,462	73.96	
2nd round result
RPR	Jean-Charles Cavaillé	28,224	54.93	
PS	Jean-Pierre Le Roch	23,154	45.07	
Turnout		51,378	74.44	
RPR hold				

== Sources ==
- Official results of French elections from 1998: "Résultats électoraux officiels en France" (in French).
