= Stéphane Delautrette =

French politician

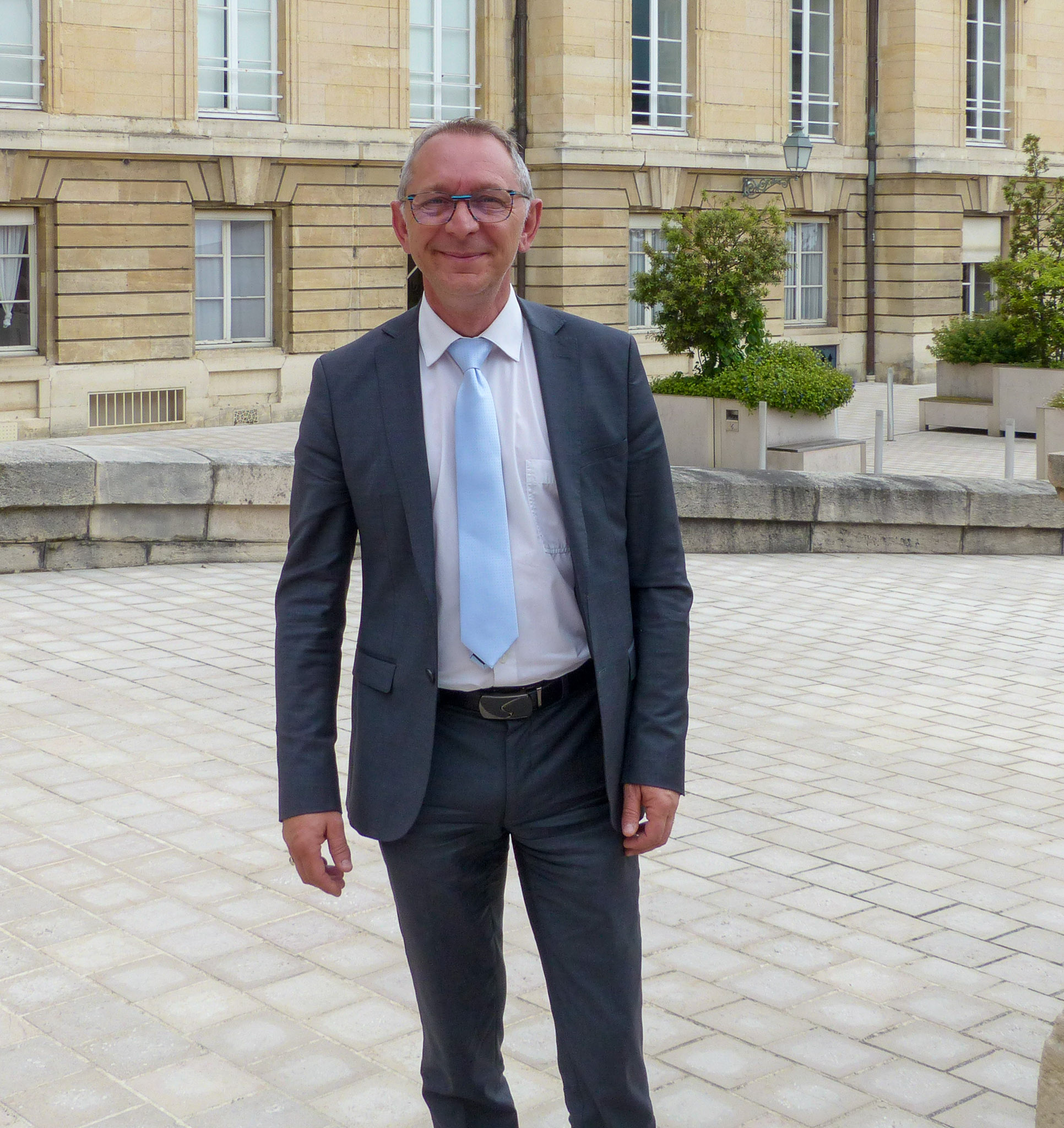
- Stéphane Delautrette in 2022

Member of the National Assembly for the Haute-Vienne's 2nd constituency
- Incumbent
- Assumed office 22 June 2022
- Preceded by: Pierre Venteau

Personal details
- Born: 20 September 1972 (age 53) Limoges, France
- Party: Socialist Party
- Other political affiliations: NUPES

Stéphane Delautrette (born 20 September 1972) is a French politician from the Socialist Party who has represented Haute-Vienne's 2nd constituency in the National Assembly since 2022.

In 2023, Delautrette publicly endorsed the re-election of the Socialist Party's chairman Olivier Faure.

== See also ==
- List of deputies of the 16th National Assembly of France
