= Landes's 2nd constituency =

Constituency of the National Assembly of France

2nd constituency of Landes
- inline Constituency of the National Assembly of France

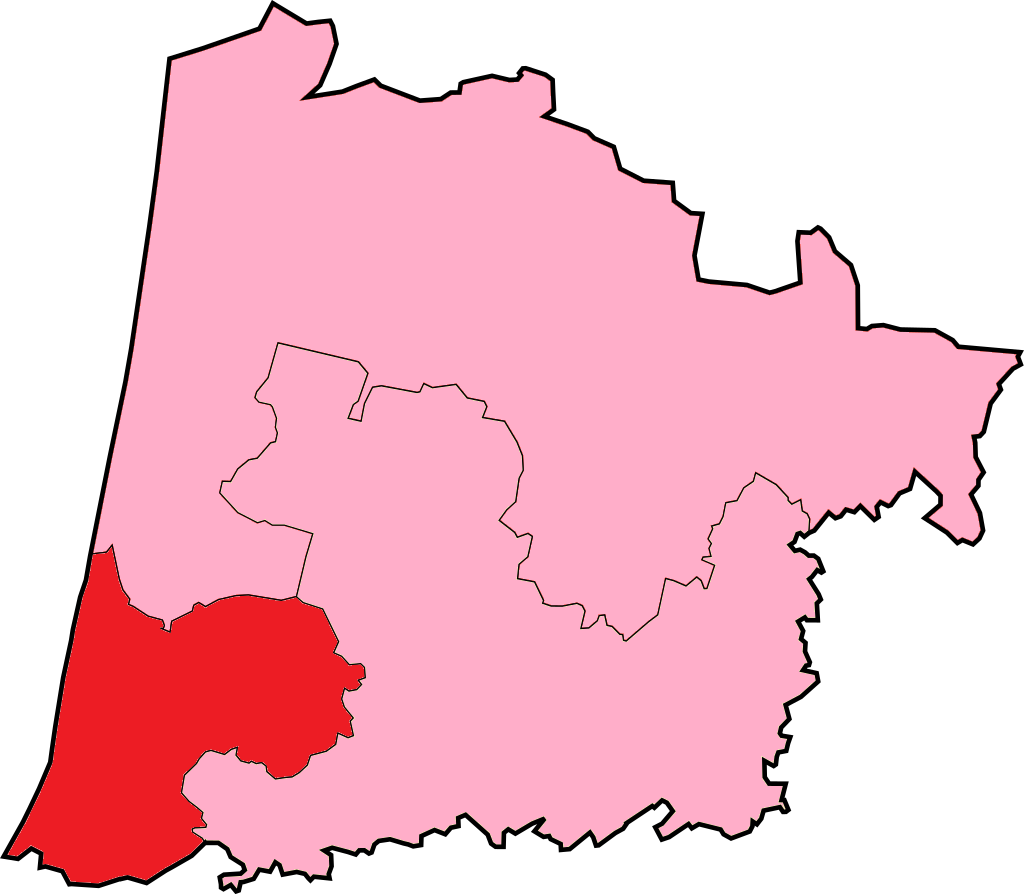
- Landes's 2nd Constituency shown within Landes
- Deputy: Lionel Causse; LREM
- Department: Landes
- Cantons: (pre-2015) Dax-Nord, Dax-Sud, Saint-Martin-de-Seignanx, Saint-Vincent-de-Tyrosse, Soustons
- Registered voters: 120071

The 2nd constituency of the Landes (French: Deuxième circonscription des Landes) is a French legislative constituency in the Landes département. Like the other 576 French constituencies, it elects one MP using the two-round system, with a run-off if no candidate receives over 50% of the vote in the first round.

== Description ==
The 2nd constituency of the Landes lies in the south of the department bordering the Atlantic Ocean to the west and Pyrénées-Atlantiques to the south. As well as a long stretch of coastline the seat also includes the spa town and Subprefecture Dax.

Politically the constituency has traditionally supported the Socialist Party (France) with the exceptions of the 1993 and 2017 elections.

== Assembly Members ==
Election	Member	Party
1988	Jean-Pierre Pénicaut	PS
1993	Henri Lalanne	UDF
1997	Jean-Pierre Dufau	PS
2002	Jean-Pierre Dufau	PS
2007	Jean-Pierre Dufau	PS
2012	Jean-Pierre Dufau	PS
2017	Lionel Causse	LREM
2022	Lionel Causse	LREM
2024	Lionel Causse	RE

== Election results ==
=== 2024 ===
Candidate	Party	Alliance	First round			Second round		
Candidate	Party	Alliance	Votes	%	+/–	Votes	%	+/–
Ludovic Biesbrouck	RN		28,264	32.60	+16.49	32,167	38.19	new
Lionel Causse	REN	Ensemble	26,051	30.05	-3.68	52,064	61.81	+9.87
Jean-Marc Lespade	PCF	NFP	24,645	28.43	-1.86	withdrew		
Marc Vernier	LR	UDC	4,625	5.33	+0.54			
Dominique Lecuona	PO		1,358	1.57	+0.66			
Stéphane David	REC		918	1.06	-3.06			
Pascal Demangeot	LO		839	0.97	+0.19			
Votes			86,700	100.00		84,231	100.00	
Valid votes			86,700	96.89	-0.44	84,231	93.87	+1.80
Blank votes			1,886	2.11	+0.09	4,012	4.47	-0.91
Null votes			899	1.00	+0.34	1,487	1.66	-0.89
Turnout			89,485	71.81	+19.38	89,730	72.01	+20.51
Abstentions			35,132	28.19	-19.38	34,885	27.99	-20.51
Registered voters			124,617			124,615		
Result			RE HOLD					

=== 2022 ===
Legislative Election 2022: Landes's 2nd constituency
Party	Candidate	Votes	%	±%
LREM (Ensemble)	Lionel Causse	21,175	33.73	-9.23
PCF (NUPÉS)	Jean-Marc Lespade	19,015	30.29	-1.97
RN	Véronique Rivoire	10,116	16.11	+6.40
LR (UDC)	Marc Vernier	3,008	4.79	−6.08
R!	Sophie De Brosses	2,736	4.36	N/A
REC	Muriel Loubet	2,584	4.12	N/A
Others	N/A	4,147	6.61	
Turnout		62,781	52.43	−1.62
2nd round result
LREM (Ensemble)	Lionel Causse	30,305	51.94	-11.01
PCF (NUPÉS)	Jean-Marc Lespade	28,043	48.06	+11.01
Turnout		58,348	51.50	+4.92
LREM hold				

=== 2017 ===
Candidate	Label	First round		Second round	
Candidate	Label	Votes	%	Votes	%
Lionel Causse	REM	25,414	42.96	29,682	62.95
Caroline Dacharry	FI	6,960	11.77	17,471	37.05
Sylviane Pacot	LR	6,433	10.87		
Christine Basly-Lapègue	PS	6,163	10.42		
Francis Garcia	FN	5,742	9.71		
Jean-Marc Lespade	PCF	3,881	6.56		
Marie-Ange Delavenne	ECO	2,078	3.51		
Jean-Pierre Pourrut	DLF	1,159	1.96		
Didier Tousis	DVG	514	0.87		
Éric Lavit	DIV	420	0.71		
Pascal Castéra	EXG	394	0.67		
Votes		59,158	100.00	47,153	100.00
Valid votes		59,158	97.48	47,153	90.16
Blank votes		1,080	1.78	3,454	6.60
Null votes		447	0.74	1,690	3.23
Turnout		60,685	54.05	52,297	46.58
Abstentions		51,594	45.95	59,976	53.42
Registered voters		112,279		112,273	
Source: Ministry of the Interior

=== 2012 ===
2012 legislative election in Landes's 2nd constituency
Candidate	Party	First round		Second round	
Candidate	Party	Votes	%	Votes	%
Jean-Pierre Dufau	PS	27,501	44.37%	34,840	60.75%
Julien Dubois	UMP	16,065	25.92%	22,513	39.25%
Jean-Marc Lespade	FG	6,551	10.57%		
Laurence Monteil	FN	6,376	10.29%		
Alain Godot	EELV	1,926	3.11%		
Philippe Mouhel	MoDem	1,480	2.39%		
Jean-Pierre Pourrut	DLR	861	1.39%		
Michel Lefebvre	AEI	433	0.70%		
Pascal Castera	LO	276	0.45%		
Daniel Minvielle	NPA	260	0.42%		
Mélanie Bosquet	??	254	0.41%		
Valid votes		61,983	98.03%	57,353	96.04%
Spoilt and null votes		1,246	1.97%	2,363	3.96%
Votes cast / turnout		63,229	60.34%	59,716	56.99%
Abstentions		41,555	39.66%	45,061	43.01%
Registered voters		104,784	100.00%	104,777	100.00%
