= Émilie Chalas =

French politician (born 1977)

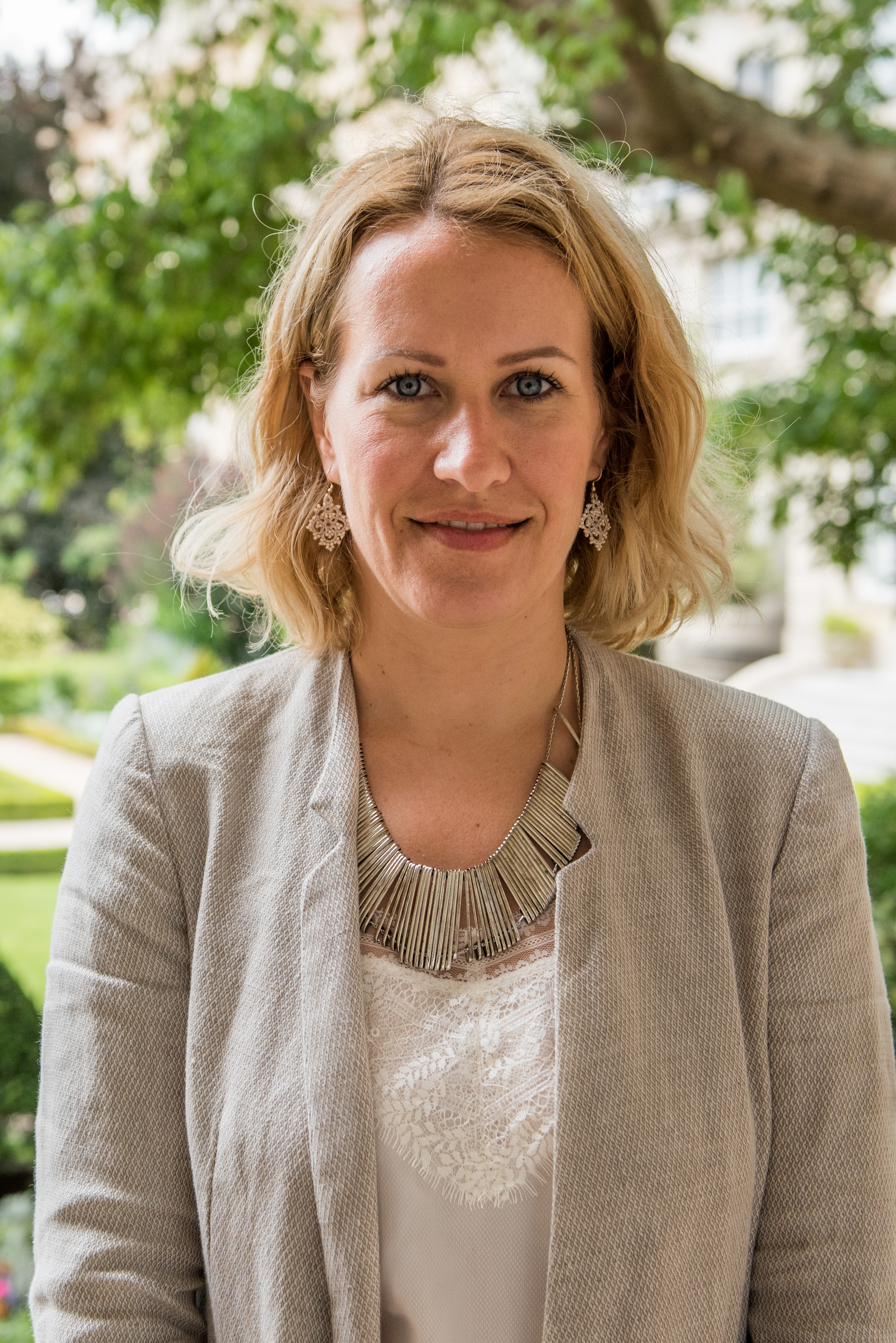

Member of the National Assembly for Isère's 3rd constituency
- In office 21 June 2017 – 21 June 2022
- Preceded by: Michel Destot
- Succeeded by: Élisa Martin

Personal details
- Born: 18 October 1977 (age 48) Échirolles, France
- Party: La République En Marche!
- Education: University of Grenoble

Émilie Chalas (born 18 October 1977) is a French politician of La République En Marche! (LREM) who was elected to the French National Assembly on 18 June 2017, representing the department of Isère.

== Political career ==
In parliament, Chalas served on the Committee on Legal Affairs. In addition to her committee assignments, she was a member of the French-Sri Lankan Parliamentary Friendship Group.

In the 2022 French legislative election she lost her seat to Élisa Martin from La France Insoumise.

In the 2024 French legislative election, she arrived third at the issue of the first round. On 1 July 2024, she announced her decision to leave the race before the second round.

== Political positions ==
In October 2017, Chalas was one of 54 LREM members who called for a swift ban on the marketing and use of glyphosate.

In July 2019, Chalas voted in favor of the French ratification of the European Union’s Comprehensive Economic and Trade Agreement (CETA) with Canada.

== Controversy ==
In November 2021, news media reported that Chalas had received anonymous death threats.
