= Yvan Lachaud =

French politician

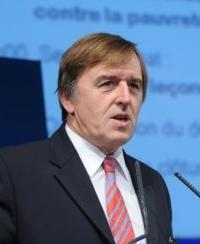
Yvan Lachaud

Yvan Lachaud (born 4 March 1954 in Nîmes, Gard) is a member of the National Assembly of France. He represents the Gard department, and is a member of the New Centre.

In 2019, Lachaud publicly declared his support for incumbent President Emmanuel Macron.
