= 2018 Territoire de Belfort's 1st constituency by-election =

← 2017	28 January 2018 (first round); 4 February 2018 (second round)	2022 →
- Turnout: 29.51% ▼20.23% (first round); 28.91% ▼15.35% (second round)
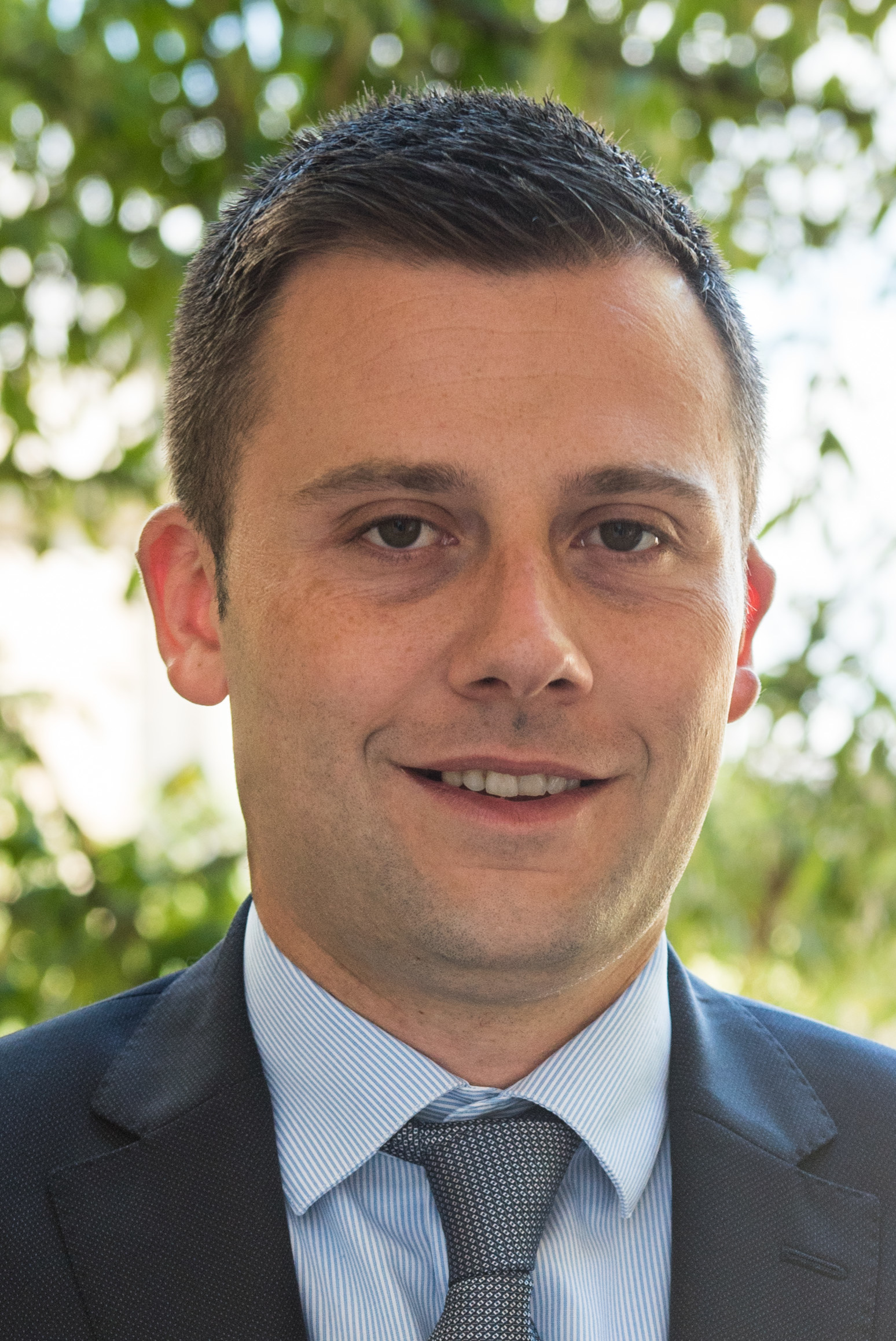

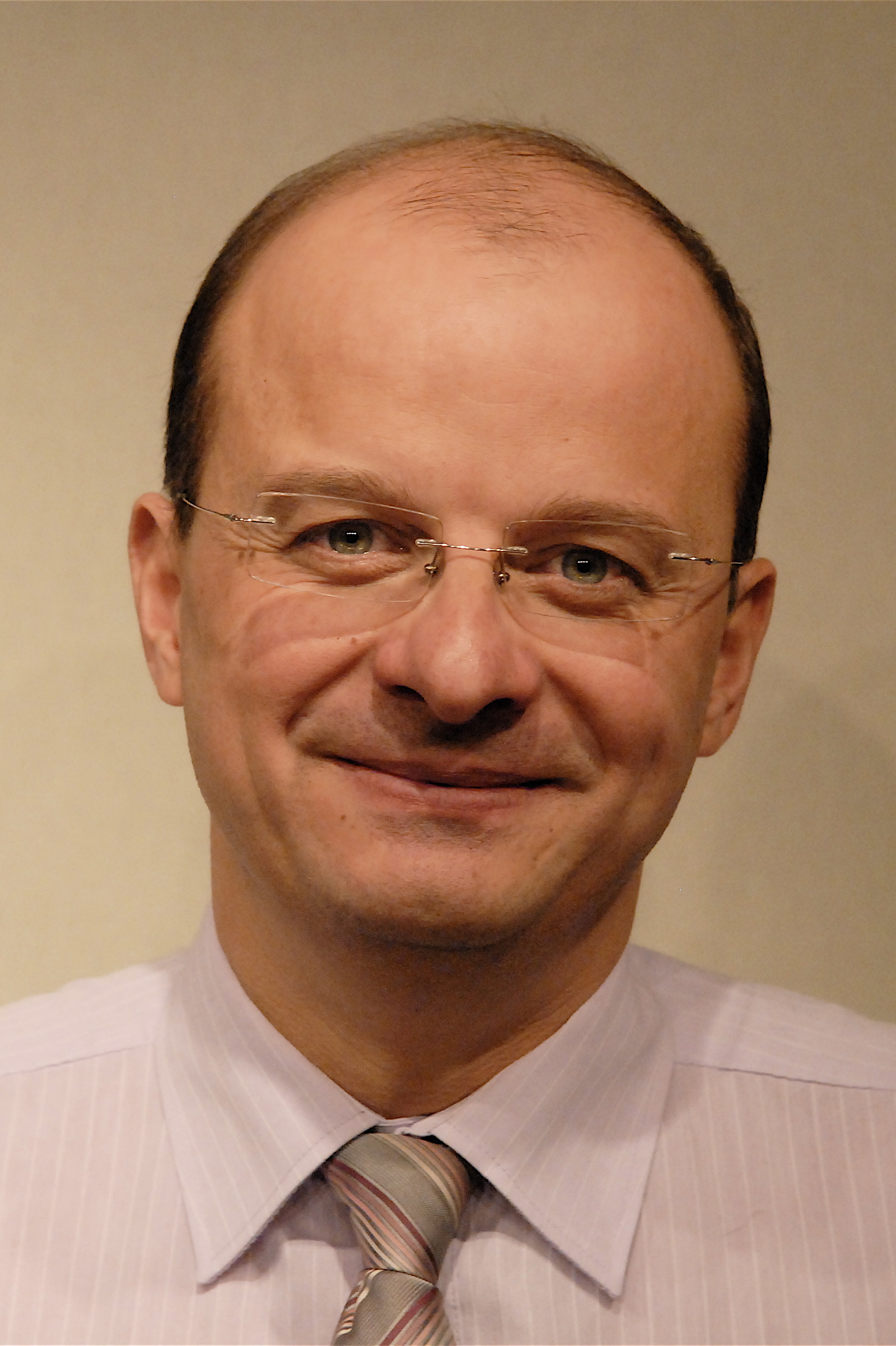

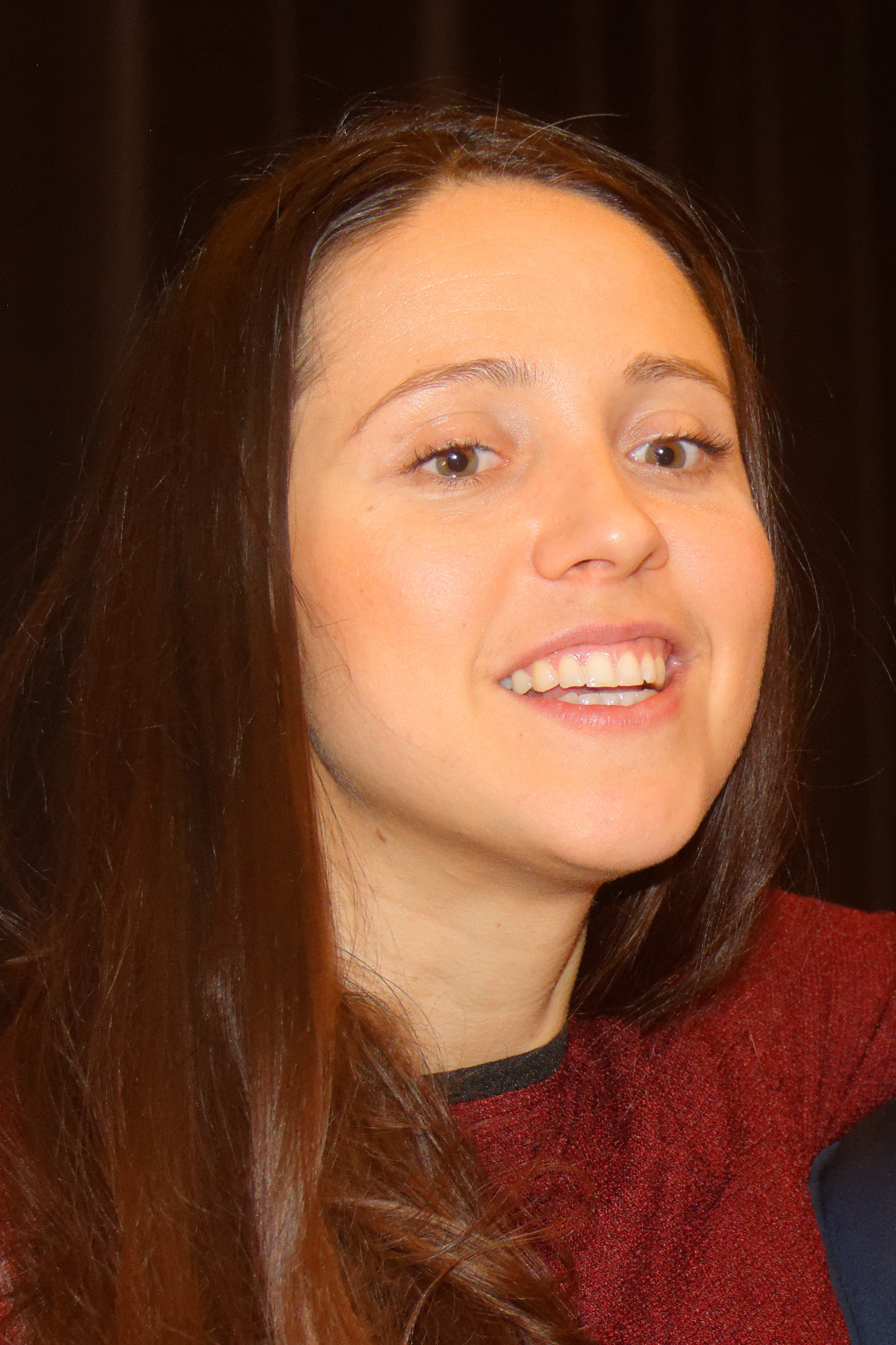

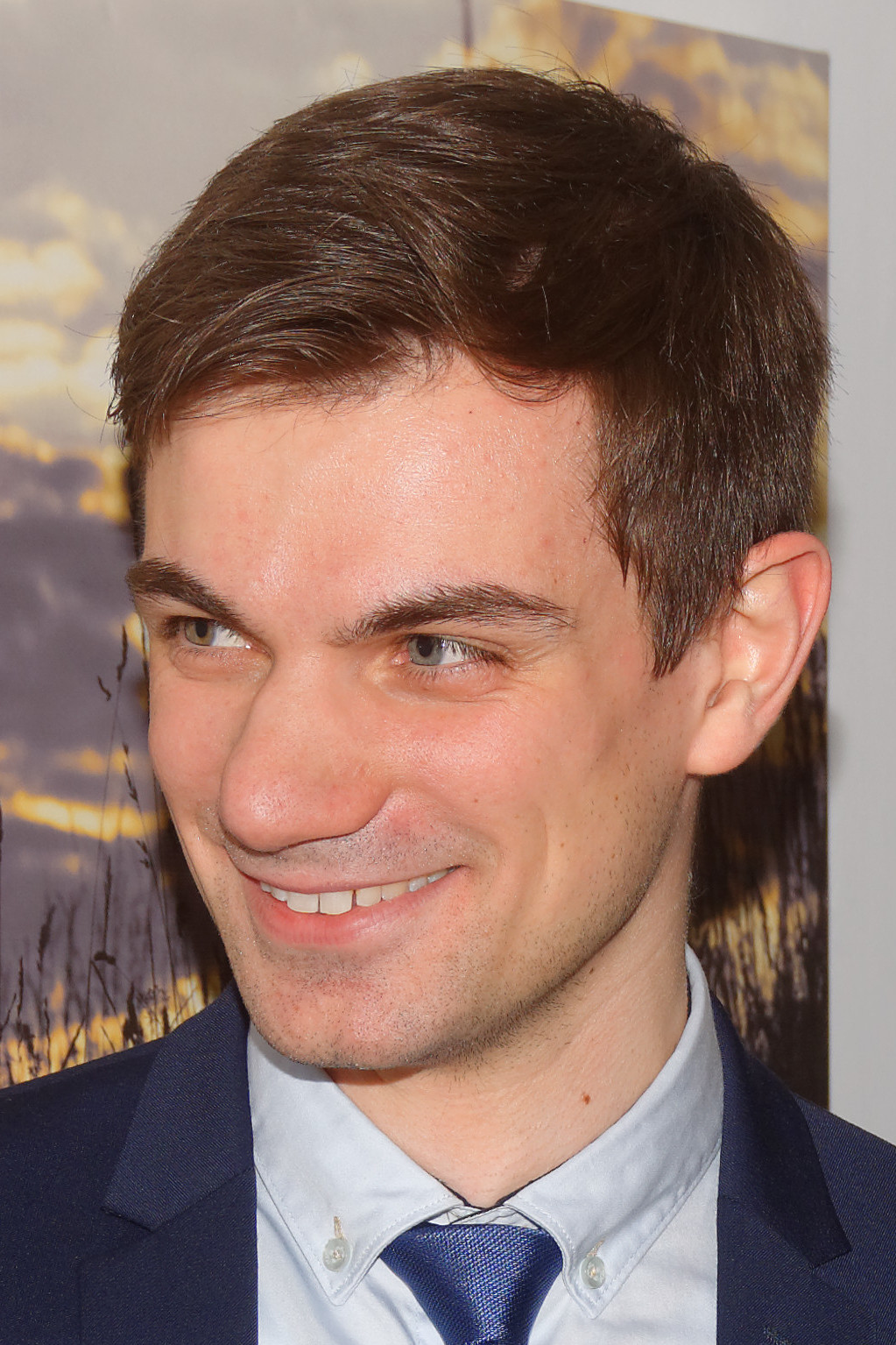
Nominee	Ian Boucard	Christophe Grudler	Anais Beltran
Party	LR	MoDem	LFI
1st round %	5,266; 39.02% ▲15.32%	3,600; 26.67% ▼5.16%	1,568; 11.62% ▼0.55%
2nd round %	7,229; 58.93% ▲8.17%	5,039; 41.07% ▼8.17%	Eliminated
Nominee	Jean-Raphaël Sandri
Party	FN
1st round %	1,015; 7.52% ▼9.98%
2nd round %	Eliminated
Deputy before election
Ian Boucard
LR
Elected deputy
Ian Boucard
LR

The first round of a by-election was held in Territoire de Belfort's 1st constituency on 28 January 2018, with a second round on 4 February because no candidate secured a majority of votes in the first round. The by-election was called due to the invalidation of the election of Ian Boucard, candidate of The Republicans (LR), in the June 2017 legislative elections by the Constitutional Council on 8 December 2017, due to the distribution of misleading electoral leaflets by Boucard's campaign between the two rounds.

The by-election was the first since the election of Emmanuel Macron as president, and marked the first confrontation between The Patriots and the National Front (FN) since Florian Philippot quit the FN to found his own party.

In the first round on 28 January, Ian Boucard of The Republicans and Christophe Grudler of the Democratic Movement (MoDem) advanced to the second round, as they did in June 2017, with Boucard securing a far higher percentage of votes amid low turnout. Boucard won the second round of the by-election on 4 February by a margin of nearly 18 points.

== Background ==
The night of the second round of the 2017 legislative election in Territoire de Belfort's 1st constituency on 18 June, Christophe Grudler, candidate of the Democratic Movement (MoDem), announced that he would file an appeal with the Constitutional Council appealing the election of Ian Boucard of The Republicans (LR). In particular, Grudler suspected that Boucard was responsible for the distribution of an electoral leaflet purporting to be from La France Insoumise (FI) and featuring imagery of Jean-Luc Mélenchon between the two rounds; the party subsequently confirmed that it was not responsible for the leaflet.

On 8 December, the constitutional council resolved to annul the result of the election in the constituency, arguing that the distribution of 10,000 and 15,000 leaflets, respectively, purporting to be from La France Insoumise and the National Front (FN) by the campaign of Boucard – without the agreement of either party – would have been sufficient to influence enough voters in the constituency to vote differently than they might otherwise would have, and potentially produced a different result, given the small vote margin separating the candidates. As a result, a by-election was called within the constituency to fill the vacant seat.

On 15 December 2017, the by-election was scheduled for 28 January 2018, with a second round on 4 February should no candidate secure a majority of votes in the first round. Candidates were required to declare their candidacies between 2 and 5 January. It was the first by-election since Emmanuel Macron was elected president, coinciding with the by-election in Val-d'Oise's 1st constituency held on the same day.

Polling stations were open from 8:00 to 18:00 CET during both rounds.

== Candidates ==
The first candidates to officially declare their candidacies were Ian Boucard for The Republicans, Christophe Grudler for the MoDem and La République En Marche! (REM), Yves Fontanive for Lutte Ouvrière (LO), and Jonathan Vallart for the Popular Republican Union (UPR), with Jean-Raphaël Sandri invested again by the National Front. The left-of-centre parties discussed the possibility of a union to present a single candidate, with these discussions ultimately resulting in a union candidacy led by Anaïs Beltran for La France Insoumise, supported by the Citizen and Republican Movement (MRC) and French Communist Party (PCF), while the Socialist Party (PS) nominated Arthur Courty as its candidate, and Europe Ecology – The Greens (EELV) nominated Vincent Jeudy, who received 6.5% of the vote in the department's other constituency during the 2017 legislative elections. Julie Kohlenberg received the investiture of Debout la France (DLF), and Sophie Montel, a Member of the European Parliament (MEP) who joined Florian Philippot in leaving the FN to form The Patriots, within which she serves as vice president, also contested the by-election.

On 9 January 2018, the Union of Democrats and Independents (UDI) announced its support for Ian Boucard, candidate of The Republicans (LR), with UDI deputy Michel Zumkeller, who represents the neighboring constituency, not having faced a LR opponent in the June 2017 legislative elections.

== Campaign ==
Grudler accuses Boucard of "electoral fraud" on 25 January

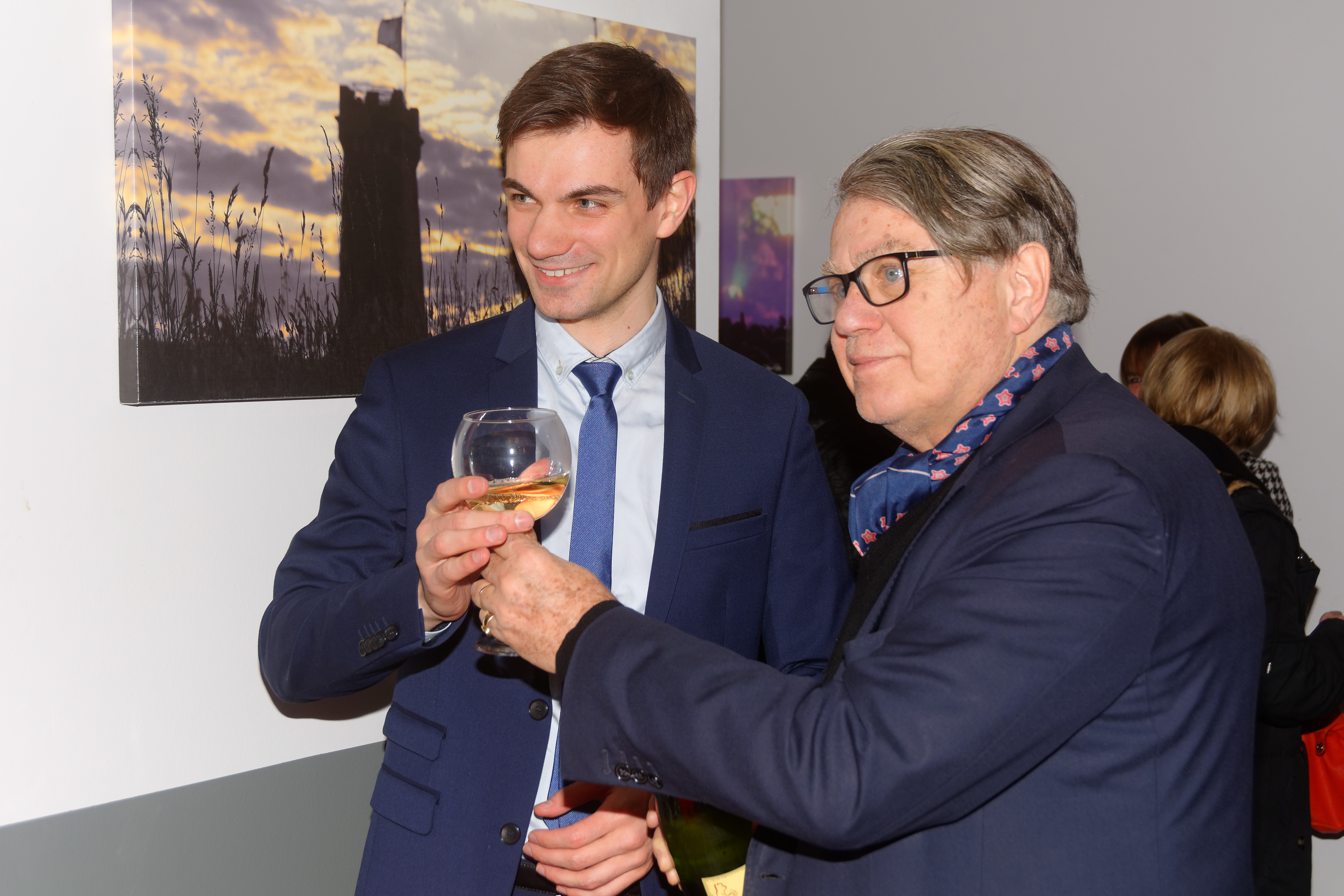
Sandri and Collard on 20 January

Numerous politicians visited the constituency ahead of the by-election in support of their parties' candidates. On 18 January, Christian Jacob, president of the LR group in the National Assembly, visited the constituency in support of Boucard, as did deputy Annie Genevard. On 19 January, MoDem minister Jacqueline Gourault and president of the MoDem group in the National Assembly Marc Fesneau visited in support of Grudler, followed by Philippot in support of Montel and FN deputy Gilbert Collard and mayor of Hénin-Beaumont Steeve Briois in support of Sandri on 20 January, with Sébastien Chenu visiting later. Alexis Corbière visited in support of Beltran on 24 January, as did Clémentine Autain, followed by François Bayrou and Christophe Castaner in a joint meeting in support of Grudler on 25 January. Boris Vallaud was the only Socialist to visit in support of Courty. David Cormand, Nicolas Dupont-Aignan and François Asselineau also visited to support the candidates of their respective parties.

A debate co-hosted by Catherine Eme-Ziri of France 3 Franche-Comté and Emilie Pou of France Bleu Belfort Montbéliard between Boucard, Grudler, Sandri, Montel, Beltran, and Courty was broadcast live online on 12 January, before being shown on "Dimanche en Politique" on France 3 Franche-Comté on 14 January. Philippe Piot, journalist for L'Est Républicain in Belfort, was also present at the debate.

At the public meeting on 18 January with Jacob and Genevard, Boucard announced he would sue Grudler for calling him a "cheater" and "fraudster" over the distribution of leaflets by LR activists purporting to be from La France Insoumise and the National Front (which resulted in the invalidation of the election by the constitutional council). The hearing was held on 25 January, the same day as the visit of Bayrou and Castaner in support of Grudler. At the hearing, Boucard's lawyer accused Grudler of distributing "defamatory and injurious" electoral leaflets that alleged he had committed "outright electoral fraud" and a "robbery" during the campaign in June, and further added that Grudler's campaign distorted the decision of the constitutional council. The defense lawyer stood by the characterization, emphasizing that the constitutional council ruled in favor of Grudler's challenge and invalidated the election in June. Boucard, along with mayor of Belfort Damien Meslot (who was also accused of "robbery"), sought €500 in damages in the case, which was dismissed on 8 February, after the by-election. Boucard and Meslot were ordered to pay Grudler €1,000 and cover legal costs associated with the case.

The by-election was the first electoral challenge on the far-right between The Patriots and the National Front, with Montel, the former president of the FN group in the regional council of Bourgogne-Franche-Comté and a currently-serving MEP, having been a prominent member of the National Front within the region before she joined Philippot's party. However, she does not reside within the constituency.

Controversial posts by Sandri on social media were discovered by French media, including a tweet evoking the "problem" of removal of "transsexualism" from the list of mental illnesses. A report in Libération published a week before the first round uncovered the alleged Facebook account of the FN candidate, connected to several FN officials and apparent family members and with the same date of birth and location, under the name of "JR Alexandre". Though Sandri denied the account was his when questioned about it, and said that the "journalist and Sophie Montel are in cahoots", posts by the account were removed the following day. Among the activities of the account were a number of likes on anti-abortion pages, support for Francoism, jokes about the Nazis, and several images of Augusto Pinochet, including one used as the account's profile image. In a statement, Montel denounced Sandri's behavior and support for "authoritarian regimes", demanding that Marine Le Pen "firmly condemn" the FN candidate in the constituency.

In the first round on 28 January, Boucard led Grudler by 12 percentage points, reversing the order in June. Beltran lagged well behind with 11.62% of the vote, followed by Sandri, who fell to 7.52% of the vote. While the race between Sandri and Montel was closely watched, the latter ultimately garnered only 1.99% of the vote. Socialist candidate Arthur Courty received 2.60% of the vote, an extremely low score compared to the party's score of 9.10% in the June 2017 legislative elections. A debate between the two rounds was broadcast on France Bleu Belfort Montbéliard between 18:30 and 19:00 CET on 1 February, co-hosted with Philippe Piot, journalist for L'Est Républicain. Boucard was re-elected by a large margin in the second round on 4 February, securing 58.93% of the vote against 41.07% for Grudler.

== 2017 election result ==
First round results by commune

Second round results by commune

Candidate	Party	First round		Second round	
Candidate	Party	Votes	%	Votes	%
Christophe Grudler	MoDem	7,379	31.83	9,131	49.25
Ian Boucard	LR	5,493	23.70	9,410	50.75
Jean-Raphaël Sandri	FN	4,057	17.50		
Anais Beltran	LFI	2,821	12.17		
Bastien Faudot	MRC	2,110	9.10		
Philippe Legros	DIV	431	1.86		
Sabine Verdant	PCF	334	1.44		
Christiane Petitot	LO	243	1.05		
Jonathan Vallart	UPR	175	0.75		
Mustafa Cetin	DIV	139	0.60		
Romain Lagache	DIV	0	0.00		
Votes		23,182	100.00	18,541	100.00
Valid votes		23,182	97.35	18,541	87.59
Blank votes		430	1.81	1,840	8.69
Null votes		200	0.84	788	3.72
Turnout		23,812	49.74	21,169	44.25
Abstentions		24,061	50.26	26,669	55.75
Registered voters		47,873		47,838	
Source: Ministry of the Interior, political parties

== 2018 by-election result ==
First round results by commune

Second round results by commune

Candidate	Party	First round			Second round		
Candidate	Party	Votes	%	+/–	Votes	%	+/–
Ian Boucard	LR	5,266	39.02	+15.32	7,229	58.93	+8.17
Christophe Grudler	MoDem	3,600	26.67	–5.16	5,039	41.07	–8.17
Anais Beltran	LFI	1,568	11.62	–0.55			
Jean-Raphaël Sandri	FN	1,015	7.52	–9.98			
Vincent Jeudy	EELV	601	4.45	+4.45			
Julie Kohlenberg	DLF	515	3.82	+3.82			
Arthur Courty	PS	351	2.60	–6.50			
Sophie Montel	LP	268	1.99	+1.99			
Yves Fontanive	LO	214	1.59	+0.54			
Jonathan Vallart	UPR	99	0.73	–0.02			
Votes		13,497	100.00	–	12,268	100.00	–
Valid votes		13,497	96.39	–0.97	12,268	89.06	+1.47
Blank votes		339	2.42	–0.62	959	6.96	–1.73
Null votes		167	1.19	+0.35	548	3.98	–0.26
Turnout		14,003	29.51	–20.23	13,775	28.91	–15.35
Abstentions		33,451	70.49	+20.23	33,880	71.09	+15.35
Registered voters		47,454			47,655		
Source: Préfecture du Territoire de Belfort, Préfecture du Territoire de Belfort
