= Results of the 2024 French legislative election in Territoire de Belfort =

Following the first round of the 2024 French legislative election on 30 June 2024, runoff elections in each constituency where no candidate received a vote share greater than 50 percent were scheduled for 7 July. Candidates permitted to stand in the runoff elections needed to either come in first or second place in the first round or achieve more than 12.5 percent of the votes of the entire electorate (as opposed to 12.5 percent of the vote share due to low turnout).

== Territoire de Belfort ==
=== 1st constituency ===
Candidate	Party or alliance		First round		Second round	
Candidate	Party or alliance		Votes	%	Votes	%
Carine Manck	National Rally		12,719	39.73	14,108	44.62
Ian Boucard	The Republicans		7,679	23.99	17,512	55.38
Marie-Eve Belorgey	New Popular Front	Socialist Party	7,233	22.59		
Maggy Grosdidier	Ensemble	Democratic Movement	3,608	11.27		
Christiane Petitot	Far-left	Lutte Ouvrière	426	1.33		
Marion Kemps Houver	Sovereigntist right	Debout la France	350	1.09		
Séverine Merlini	Regionalists	Independent	0	0.00		
Total			32,015	100.00	31,620	100.00
Valid votes			32,015	97.70	31,620	95.50
Invalid votes			262	0.80	433	1.31
Blank votes			493	1.50	1,058	3.20
Total votes			32,770	100.00	33,111	100.00
Registered voters/turnout			47,553	68.91	47,558	69.62

=== 2nd constituency ===
Candidate	Party or alliance		First round		Second round	
Candidate	Party or alliance		Votes	%	Votes	%
Guillaume Bigot	National Rally		11,887	37.86	14,546	50.59
Florian Chauche	New Popular Front	La France Insoumise	8,799	28.02	14,209	49.41
Didier Vallverdu	The Republicans		5,422	17.27		
Josée Martinez	Ensemble	Democratic Movement	4,794	15.27		
Simon Pheulpin	Far-left	Lutte Ouvrière	497	1.58		
Célia Keck	Regionalists	Independent	0	0.00		
Total			31,399	100.00	28,755	100.00
Valid votes			31,399	97.33	28,755	89.28
Invalid votes			329	1.02	936	2.91
Blank votes			533	1.65	2,517	7.81
Total votes			32,261	100.00	32,208	100.00
Registered voters/turnout			46,433	69.48	46,434	69.36
