= Gilberte Marin-Moskovitz =

French politician (1937–2019)

Member of the National Assembly for Territoire de Belfort's 2nd constituency
- In office 5 July 1997 – 7 September 2000
- Preceded by: Jean-Pierre Chevènement
- Succeeded by: Jean-Pierre Chevènement
- In office 29 July 1988 – 23 April 1991
- Preceded by: Jean-Pierre Chevènement
- Succeeded by: Jean-Pierre Chevènement

Personal details
- Born: Gilberte Céline Marin; 22 June 1937 Belfort, Territoire de Belfort, France
- Died: 26 June 2019 (aged 82) Belfort, Territoire de Belfort, France
- Party: Socialist Party
- Spouse: Jean-Paul Moskovitz
- Awards: Chevalier of the Légion d'honneur

Gilberte Céline Marin-Moskovitz (née Marin; 22 June 1937 – 26 June 2019) was a French Socialist Party politician who served as deputy of Territoire de Belfort's 2nd constituency in the National Assembly from 1988 to 1991 and again from 1997 to 2000. She was also elected a councillor to the Belfort Municipal City Council in 1977 and was a four-term General Councillor of the canton of Belfort-Sud between 1982 and 2008. Marin-Moskovitz was appointed Chevalier of the Légion d'honneur in 1996.

== Biography ==
Marin-Moskovitz was born to Louis Marin and Victoire Marin (née Bichler), in Belfort, Territoire de Belfort on 22 June 1937; she had a twin brother who died of meningitis at age seven. She was baptised at the église Saint-Joseph de Belfort. Marin-Moskovitz was trained at the Young Christian Workers, and joined the Socialist Party in 1972. She became a secretary at the manufacturing company Alstom on 8 May 1960 and her probationary period was left uncompleted due to a strike that she was dissuaded from joining by the influence of her friends. Marin-Moskovitz joined the French Confederation of Christian Workers trade union as her mother wished for her to do and not the General Confederation of Labour like her father. When Christian trade union split, she joined the French Democratic Confederation of Labour in 1964.

In March 1977, Marin-Moskovitz was elected to the Belfort Municipal City Council as a councillor. From 1982 to 2008, she served four terms as a General Councillor of the canton of Belfort-Sud. Marin-Moskovitz was elected deputy of the Territoire de Belfort's 2nd constituency of the National Assembly in the 1988 French legislative election held on 5 June 1988 and took up her mandate on 29 July 1988. She was the first women to be elected a deputy in the Territoire de Belfort. Following a fire at the Hôtel de l'Europe in Belfort in 1989, she introduced a security bill and a version of it was eventually passed in 2010. Marin-Moskovtiz was committed to women's rights, social issues and education.

Marin-Moskovitz was a member of the Commission for Cultural, Family and Social Affairs and the from 9 May 1988 to 23 April 1991. She was also a member of the Parliamentary Delegation for Demographic Problem until 14 December 1989 when she became its vice president. Marin-Moskovitz resigned as a deputy on 23 April 1991 but was re-elected to office on 12 June 1997 where she remained until her second resignation on 7 September 2000. She was again on the Commission for Cultural, Family and Social Affairs between 11 July 1997 and her resignation. Marin-Moskovitz was a member of the Special commission in charge of examining the orientation bill relating to the fight against exclusion from 28 March 1998 to 9 July 1998. She was a member of the Joint information mission on preventing and combating exclusion between 5 March 1998 and 9 July 1998 and of the Joint fact-finding mission on the economic and social prospects for the development of the European Rhine-Rhône axis from 26 March 1998 to 15 November 1998 as well as serving as its secretary. Marin-Moskovitz was a member of the Plenary Assembly of the European Committee of the Regions, serving on its Commission for Economic and Social Policy and its Commission for Culture and Education. She was instrumental in the passing of a 2010 law created by Damien Meslot mandating the compulsory installation of fire detectors in homes.

== Personal life ==
She was a Christian. Marin-Moskovitz married the Alstom executive Jean-Paul Moskovitz on 18 September 1976. They adopted several children. She was appointed Chevalier of the Légion d'honneur by the President of France on 12 July 1996. Marin-Moskovitz died on the night of 26 June 2019 in Belfort.
