= Burgundy School of Business =

French business school

- École supérieure de commerce de Dijon-Bourgogne
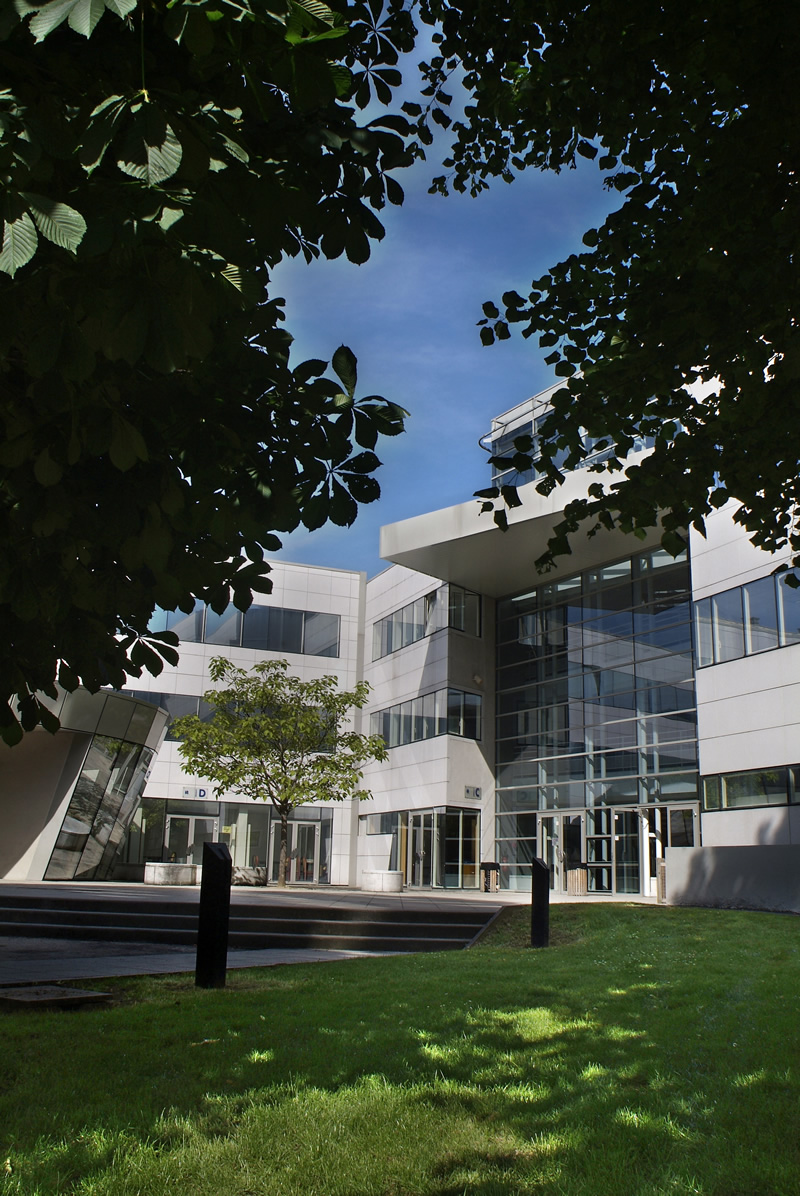
- Other name: BSB
- Motto: Lead for change
- Type: Grande école de commerce et de management (Private research university Business school)
- Established: 1899; 127 years ago
- Accreditation: Triple accreditation: AACSB; AMBA; EQUIS
- Academic affiliations: Conférence des grandes écoles
- Chairman: Stéphan Bourcieu
- Faculty: 91% PhD.; 49% female; 48% international
- Students: 2,850; 25% international
- Location: Dijon, France, Lyon, France, Paris, France
- Campus: Urban
- Language: English-only & French-only instruction
- Website: www.bsb-education.com

Three BSB campuses, all in France

Burgundy School of Business (BSB), created in 1899 by the Dijon Chamber of Commerce, is a private higher educational establishment. The school is a member of the network of French Grandes écoles (Conférence des Grandes Écoles).

== History ==
Founded in at the end of the 19th century as École Supérieure de Commerce de Dijon (ESC Dijon), BSB is one of the oldest business schools in the world.

- 1899 - École Supérieure de Commerce de Dijon (ESC Dijon) founded by an entrepreneur, Léon Gadeau, with the support of industrialists and Burgundy wine merchants (now called: Burgundy School of Business).
- 1900 - ESC Dijon officially recognized by the government of France.
- 1916 - School admits girls, and becomes co-educational.
- 1919 - The first American students arrive at ESC Dijon.
- 1965 - ESC Dijon students go to China on an exchange trip, the first of its kind for a French school.
- 1968 - First international exchange agreement with the Staatliche Höhere Wirtschaftschule in Pforzheim, Germany.
- 1987 - ESC Dijon is one of the 14 founding schools of the Chapter of the Conférence des Grandes Ecoles de Commerce.
- 1994 - First international double degrees.
- 2000 - First international courses (offered in English, Spanish and German) and first management courses in a foreign language in the Grande École programme.
- 2012 - Opening of the Paris campus.
- 2013 - Opening of the Lyon campus, and first Bachelor programme.
- 2014 - Opening of the Lyon Confluence Campus.
- 2015 - ESC Dijon, along with 7 other schools, found the Université Bourgogne Franche Comté.
- 2016 - ESC Dijon becomes BSB - Burgundy School of Business.

== Grande école degrees ==
Burgundy School of Business is a grande école, a French institution of higher education that is separate from, but parallel and often connected to, the main framework of the French public university system. Grandes écoles are elite academic institutions that admit students through an extremely competitive process, and a significant proportion of their graduates occupy the highest levels of French society. Similar to Ivy League schools in the United States, Oxbridge in the UK, and C9 League in China, graduation from a grande école is considered the prerequisite credential for any top government, administrative and corporate position in France.

The degrees are accredited by the Conférence des Grandes Écoles and awarded by the Ministry of National Education (France). Higher education business degrees in France are organized into three levels thus facilitating international mobility: the Licence / Bachelor's degrees, and the Master's and Doctorat degrees. The Bachelors and the Masters are organized in semesters: 6 for the Bachelors and 4 for the Masters. Those levels of study include various "parcours" or paths based on UE (Unités d'enseignement or Modules), each worth a defined number of European credits (ECTS). A student accumulates those credits, which are generally transferable between paths. A Bachelors is awarded once 180 ECTS have been obtained (bac + 3); a Masters is awarded once 120 additional credits have been obtained (bac +5). The highly coveted PGE (Grand Ecole Program) ends with the degree of Master's in Management (MiM)

BSB holds international, double-accreditation: EQUIS (European Quality Improvement System) & AACSB (Association to Advance Collegiate Schools of Business). In 2022, the Financial Times ranked its Masters in Management program 62nd in the world.

== Rankings ==
- In 2020, the Financial Times ranked BSB 80th in its European Business Schools ranking.
- In 2020, BSB's Master in Management programme was ranked 74th worldwide in the Financial Times Masters in Management ranking.

== Research ==
BSB established CEREN (Centre de Recherche sur l'Entreprise) in 2003 to promote models of organization and governance that can enhance and regenerate their ecosystems based on the concepts of social and societal responsibility, ethics, sustainability and diversity. Research is structured around these core areas:

- Decisions & Behaviors
- Entrepreneurship & Innovation
- Finance & Corporate Governance
- Wine & Spirits Management
- Arts & Cultural Management
- Digital Leadership

== The School of Wine & Spirits Business ==
Within BSB, it is a structure dedicated to education and research in the wine and spirits industries.

== Notable alumni ==
- Ian Boucard, French politician
