= Territoire de Belfort's 2nd constituency =

Constituency of the National Assembly of France

2nd constituency of Territoire-de-Belfort
- inline Constituency of the National Assembly of France

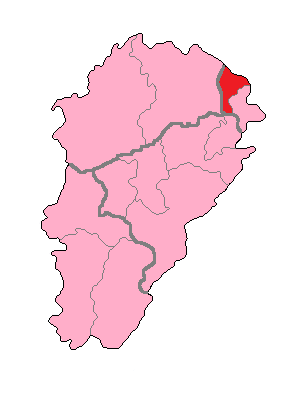
- Territoire-de-Belfort's 2nd Constituency shown within Franche-Comté
- Deputy: Guillaume Bigot; RN
- Department: Territoire-de-Belfort
- Cantons: Belfort-Nord, Belfort-Ouest, Belfort-Sud, Châtenois-les-Forges, Giromagny, Offemont, Rougemont-le-Château, Valdoie.
- Registered voters: 47,774

The 2nd constituency of Territoire-de-Belfort is a French legislative constituency in the Territoire-de-Belfort département.

== Description ==
The 2nd constituency of Territoire-de-Belfort includes most of Belfort itself as well as the territory in the north west of the department.

The constituency is notable for being the home seat of former Interior Minister Jean-Pierre Chevènement, who left the Socialist Party to found the Citizens' Movement in 1993.

== Historic Representation ==
Election	Member	Party
1978	Raymond Forni	PS
1986	Proportional representation – no election by constituency	
1988	Jean-Pierre Chevènement	PS
1988	Gilberte Marin-Moskovitz	PS
1991	Jean-Pierre Chevènement	PS
1993	Jean-Pierre Chevènement	MDC
1997	Jean-Pierre Chevènement	MDC
1997	Gilberte Marin-Moskovitz	MDC
2000	Jean-Pierre Chevènement	MDC
2002	Michel Zumkeller	PRV
2007	Michel Zumkeller	UMP-PRV
2012	Michel Zumkeller	UMP-PRV
2017	Michel Zumkeller	UDI-PRV
2022	Florian Chauche	LFI
2024	Guillaume Bigot	RN

== Election results ==
=== 2024 ===
Legislative Election 2024: Territoire de Belfort's 2nd constituency
Party	Candidate	Votes	%	±%
UL	Céline Keck	0	0.00	n/a
LFI (NFP)	Florian Chauche	8,799	28.02	+1.60
LR	Didier Vallverdu	5,422	17.27	+6.15
LO	Simon Pheulpin	497	1.58	n/a
MoDem (Ensemble)	Josée Martinez	4,794	15.27	−3.11
RN	Guillaume Bigot	11,887	37.86	+18.71
Turnout		31,399	97.33	+47.39
Registered electors		46,433		
2nd round result
RN	Guillaume Bigot	14,546	50.59	+1.96
LFI	Florian Chauche	14,209	49.41	−1.96
Turnout		28,755	89.28	+41.72
Registered electors		46,434		
RN gain from LFI				

=== 2022 ===
Legislative Election 2022: Territoire de Belfort's 2nd constituency
Party	Candidate	Votes	%	±%
LFI (NUPÉS)	Florian Chauche	5,943	26.42	+0.97
RN	Sophie Carnicer	4,307	19.15	+3.80
MoDem (Ensemble)	Baptiste Petitjean	4,134	18.38	−11.51
UDI (UDC)	Michel Zumkeller	3,669	16.31	−7.24
LR	Didier Vallverdu*	2,502	11.12	N/A
REC	Marc Felemez	1,158	5.15	N/A
Others	N/A	782	-	−
Turnout		22,495	49.94	+1.80
2nd round result
LFI (NUPÉS)	Florian Chauche	9,476	51.37	N/A
RN	Sophie Carnicer	8,971	48.63	N/A
Turnout		18,447	47.56	+9.18
LFI gain from UDI				

* Vallverdu ran as a dissident LR candidate, without the support of the party or the UDC alliance.

=== 2017 ===
Legislative Election 2017: Territoire de Belfort's 2nd constituency
Party	Candidate	Votes	%	±%
LREM	Bruno Kern	6,836	29.89	
UDI	Michel Zumkeller	5,386	23.55	
FN	Laila Leroy	3,511	15.35	
LFI	Laurent Soler	2,644	11.56	
EELV	Vincent Jeudy	1,486	6.50	
PS	Maude Clavequin	1,357	5.93	
DLF	Jean-Christophe Muringer	506	2.21	
Others	N/A	1,142		
Turnout		22,868	48.14	
2nd round result
UDI	Michel Zumkeller	9,815	53.84	
LREM	Bruno Kern	8,415	46.16	
Turnout		18,230	38.38	
UDI gain from PRV				

=== 2012 ===
Legislative Election 2012: Territoire de Belfort's 2nd constituency
Party	Candidate	Votes	%	±%
PRV	Michel Zumkeller	8,502	30.34	
DVG	Etienne Butzbach	8,403	29.99	
FN	Isabelle Roy	4,921	17.56	
DVG	Marie-José Fleury	1,862	6.64	
FG	Emmanuel Petitjean	1,377	4.91	
EELV	Vincent Jeudy	1,163	4.15	
MoDem	Jean-Christophe Messin	778	2.78	
DIV	Bachir Bouhmadou	593	2.12	
Others	N/A	425		
Turnout		28,024	58.65	
2nd round result
PRV	Michel Zumkeller	13,741	51.61	
DVG	Etienne Butzbach	12,886	48.39	
Turnout		26,627	55.74	
PRV gain from UMP				

=== 2007 ===
Legislative Election 2007: Territoire de Belfort's 2nd constituency
Party	Candidate	Votes	%	±%
UMP	Michel Zumkeller	12,380	43.15	
MRC	Jean-Pierre Chevènement	7,467	26.03	
PS	Alain Dreyfus-Schmidt	2,081	7.25	
FN	Sylvianne Schott	1,488	5.19	
LV	Jean Siron	1,279	4.46	
MoDem	Sebastien Astorga	1,238	4.32	
Far left	Marie-Christine Welfele	650	2.27	
Others	N/A	2,106		
Turnout		29,363	61.83	
2nd round result
UMP	Michel Zumkeller	15,701	54.48	
MRC	Jean-Pierre Chevènement	13,119	45.52	
Turnout		30,385	63.99	
UMP hold				

=== 2002 ===
Legislative Election 2002: Territoire de Belfort's 2nd constituency
Party	Candidate	Votes	%	±%
UMP	Michel Zumkeller	7,560	25.65	
PR	Jean-Pierre Chevènement	6,338	21.50	
PS	Yves Ackermann	5,531	18.77	
FN	Marie-Thérèse Munnier	4,854	16.47	
UDF	Lionel Courbey	1,815	6.16	
LV	Céline Raigneau	1,003	3.40	
LO	Gerard Belot	592	2.01	
Others	N/A	1,782		
Turnout		30,292	65.91	
2nd round result
UMP	Michel Zumkeller	14,543	53.42	
PR	Jean-Pierre Chevènement	12,679	46.58	
Turnout		29,615	64.44	
UMP gain from MRC				

=== 1997 ===
Legislative Election 1997: Territoire de Belfort's 2nd constituency
Party	Candidate	Votes	%	±%
MRC	Jean-Pierre Chevènement	12,339	40.48	
FN	Michel Algrin	6,228	20.43	
UDF	Jacques Bichet	6,043	19.82	
LV	Jean-Jacques Mettetal	2,143	7.03	
PCF	Daniel Couqueberg	1,503	4.93	
LO	Gérard Belot	1,291	4.23	
DVD	Christine Roussel	938	3.08	
Turnout		32,129	71.73	
2nd round result
MRC	Jean-Pierre Chevènement	17,720	55.30	
UDF	Jacques Bichet	8,346	26.04	
FN	Michel Algrin	5,979	18.66	
Turnout		33,652	75.15	
MRC hold				

== Sources ==
Official results of French elections from 2002: "Résultats électoraux officiels en France" (in French).
