= Guillaume Bigot (politician) =

French politician (born 1969)

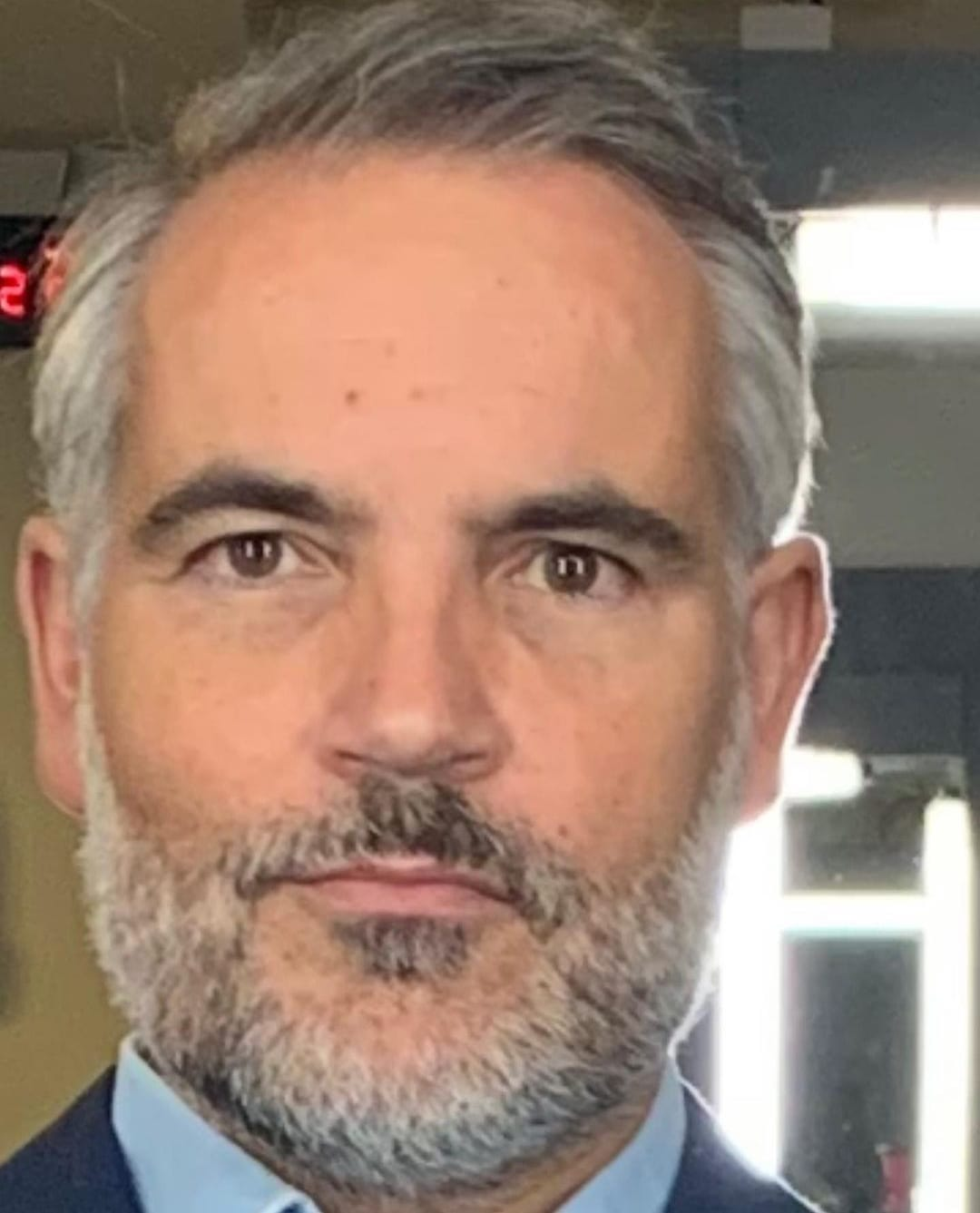
- Bigot in 2022

Member of the National Assembly for Territoire de Belfort's 2nd constituency
- Incumbent
- Assumed office 8 July 2024
- Preceded by: Florian Chauche

Personal details
- Born: 14 November 1969 (age 56)
- Party: National Rally
- Other political affiliations: Republican Pole (2002); Citizen and Republican Movement
- Education: Sciences Po

Guillaume Bigot (French pronunciation: [ɡijom biɡo]; born 14 November 1969) is a French politician of the National Rally (RN) who was elected the deputy in the National Assembly for the 2nd constituency of the Territoire de Belfort in 2024. Prior to his term as a parliamentarian, he was a columnist for CNews and director of the IPAG Business School from 2008 to 2022.

== Early life and career ==
Bigot graduated from Sciences Po in 1995. He was a lecturer in economics and geopolitics at Paris-Sud University from 1996 to 1998, and at Paris Nanterre University in 1999.

He was deputy editor-in-chief of L'Événement du jeudi from 1998 to 2000, and was a professor at Leonardo da Vinci University Center from 2000 to 2005. From 2005 to 2008 he was director of the Ecole de Management Léonard De Vinci. In the 2002 legislative election, he was the candidate of the Republican Pole in Yvelines's 8th constituency.
