= Michel Zumkeller =

French politician

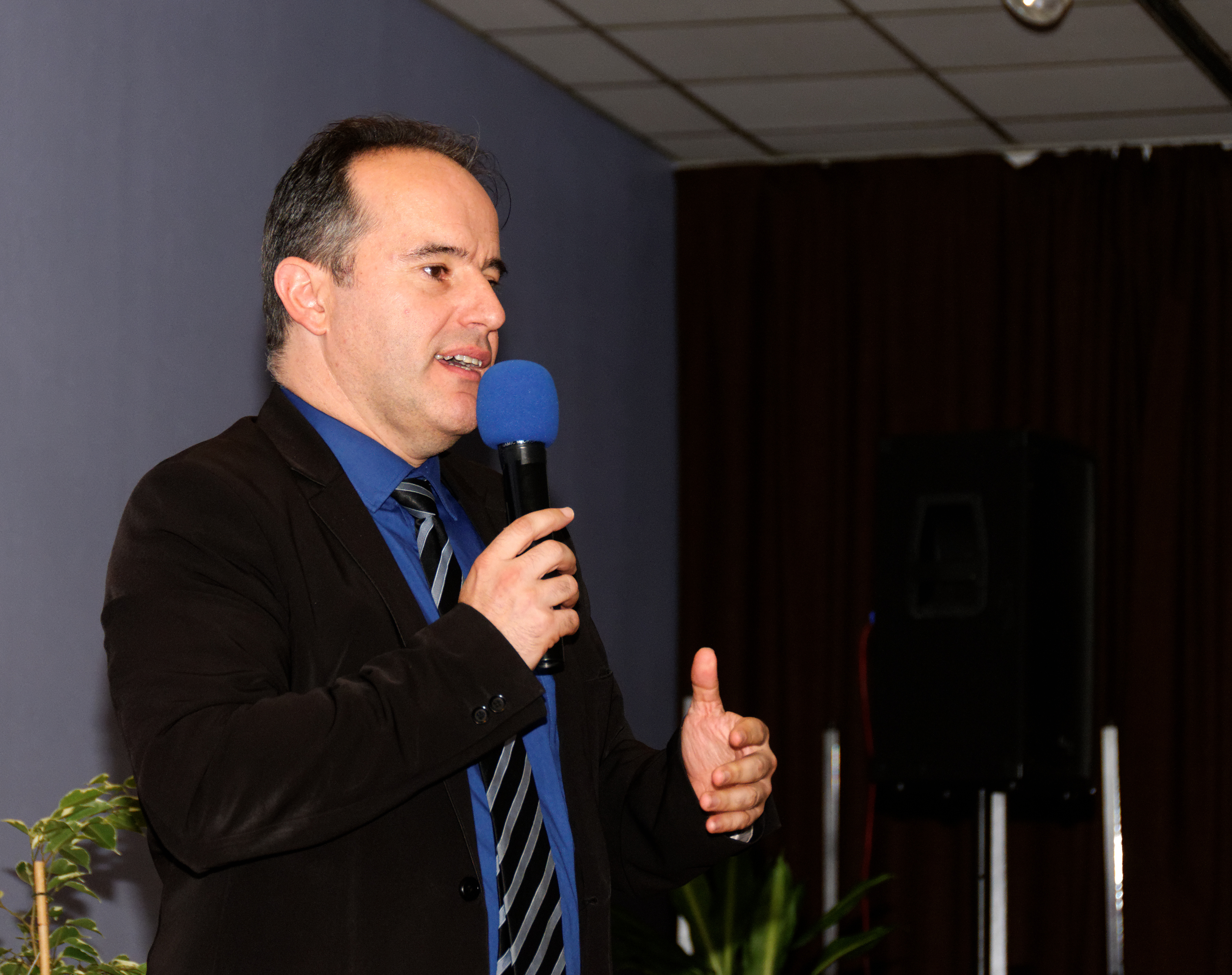

Member of the National Assembly for Territoire de Belfort's 2nd constituency
- In office 16 June 2002 – 22 June 2022
- Preceded by: Jean-Pierre Chevènement
- Succeeded by: Florian Chauche

Personal details
- Born: 21 January 1966 (age 60) Belfort, France
- Party: Union of Democrats and Independents

Michel Zumkeller (born 21 January 1966 in Belfort) is a French politician of the Union of Democrats and Independents (UDI), part of the Radical Party, who has been serving as a member of the National Assembly of France, representing the Territoire de Belfort department.

In parliament, Zumkeller serves on the Finance Committee. He was previously a member of the Committee on Cultural Affairs and Education (2017-2020) and the Committee on Legal Affairs (2009-2020).

He lost his seat in the first round of the 2022 French legislative election.
