= Territoire de Belfort's 1st constituency =

Constituency of the National Assembly of France

- Constituency for the National Assembly
- Boundary of Territoire de Belfort's 1st constituency in Territoire de Belfort

- Location of Territoire de Belfort within France
- Department: Territoire de Belfort
- Region: Bourgogne-Franche-Comté
- Population: 72,137 (2013)
- Electorate: 47,454 (2018)

Current constituency
- Deputy: Ian Boucard
- Political party: LR
- Parliamentary group: LR

Territoire de Belfort's 1st constituency is one of two French legislative constituencies in the department of Territoire de Belfort. It is currently represented by Ian Boucard of The Republicans (LR).

== Historic representation ==
Legislature	Start of mandate	End of mandate	Deputy	Party
1st	9 December 1958	9 October 1962	Raymond Schmittlein	UNR
2nd	6 December 1962	2 April 1967	Raymond Schmittlein	UNR
3rd	3 April 1967	30 May 1968	Michel Dreyfus-Schmidt	CIR
4th	11 July 1968	1 April 1973	André Tisserand	DVD
5th	2 April 1973	2 April 1978	Raymond Forni	PS
6th	3 April 1978	22 May 1981	Raymond Forni	PS
7th	2 July 1981	22 August 1985	Raymond Forni	PS
7th	23 August 1985	1 April 1986	Vacant	
8th	2 April 1986	14 May 1988	Proportional representation	
9th	23 June 1988	1 April 1993	Raymond Forni	PS
10th	2 April 1993	21 April 1997	Jean Rosselot	RPR
11th	12 June 1997	18 June 2002	Raymond Forni	PS
12th	19 June 2002	19 June 2007	Damien Meslot	UMP
13th	20 June 2007	19 June 2012	Damien Meslot	UMP
14th	20 June 2012	20 June 2017	Damien Meslot	UMP
15th	21 June 2017	8 December 2017	Ian Boucard	LR
15th	8 December 2017	4 February 2018	Vacant	
15th	5 February 2018	21 June 2022	Ian Boucard	LR
16th	22 June 2022	ongoing	Ian Boucard	LR

== Elections ==
=== 2024 ===
Legislative Election 2024: Territoire de Belfort's 1st constituency
Party	Candidate	Votes	%	±%
DLF	Marion Kemps Houver	350	1.09	n/a
DIV	Séverine Merlini	0	0.00	n/a
LR	Ian Boucard	7,679	23.99	−3.27
LO	Christiane Petitot	426	1.33	n/a
MoDem (Ensemble)	Maggy Grosdidier	3,608	11.27	−9.28
PS (NFP)	Marie-Eve Belorgey	7,233	22.59	n/a
RN	Carine Manck	12,719	39.73	+18.31
Turnout		32,015	97.70	+48.87
Registered electors		47,553		
2nd round result
LR	Ian Boucard	17,512	55.38	−6.23
RN	Carine Manck	14,108	44.62	+6.23
Turnout		31,620	95.50	+50.14
Registered electors		47,558		
LR hold				

=== 2022 ===
Legislative Election 2022: Territoire de Belfort's 1st constituency
Party	Candidate	Votes	%	±%
LR (UDC)	Ian Boucard	6,196	27.26	-11.76
RN	Christophe Soustelle	4,868	21.42	+13.90
LFI (NUPÉS)	Gérald Loridat	4,828	21.24	−1.47
MoDem (Ensemble)	Thiebaud Grudler	4,671	20.55	−6.12
REC	Nathalie Franquet	782	3.44	N/A
LP (RPR)	Jean Cordonnier	472	2.08	−3.73
Others	N/A	913	-	−
Turnout		22,730	48.83	+19.32
2nd round result
LR (UDC)	Ian Boucard	12,037	61.61	+2.68
RN	Christophe Soustelle	7,500	38.39	N/A
Turnout		19,537	45.36	+16.45
LR hold				

=== 2018 by-election ===
Candidate	Party	First round			Second round		
Candidate	Party	Votes	%	+/–	Votes	%	+/–
Ian Boucard	LR–UDI	5,266	39.02	+15.32	7,229	58.93	+8.17
Christophe Grudler	MoDem–REM	3,600	26.67	–5.16	5,039	41.07	–8.17
Anais Beltran	FI–MRC–PCF	1,568	11.62	–0.55			
Jean-Raphaël Sandri	FN	1,015	7.52	–9.98			
Vincent Jeudy	EELV	601	4.45	+4.45			
Julie Kohlenberg	DLF	515	3.82	+3.82			
Arthur Courty	PS	351	2.60	–6.50			
Sophie Montel	LP	268	1.99	+1.99			
Yves Fontanive	LO	214	1.59	+0.54			
Jonathan Vallart	UPR	99	0.73	–0.02			
Votes		13,497	100.00	–	12,268	100.00	–
Valid votes		13,497	96.39	–0.97	12,268	89.06	+1.47
Blank votes		339	2.42	–0.62	959	6.96	–1.73
Null votes		167	1.19	+0.35	548	3.98	–0.26
Turnout		14,003	29.51	–20.23	13,775	28.91	–15.35
Abstentions		33,451	70.49	+20.23	33,880	71.09	+15.35
Registered voters		47,454			47,655		
Source: Préfecture du Territoire de Belfort, Préfecture du Territoire de Belfort

=== 2017 ===
Candidate	Label	First round		Second round	
Candidate	Label	Votes	%	Votes	%
Christophe Grudler	MoDem	7,379	31.83	9,131	49.25
Ian Boucard	LR	5,493	23.70	9,410	50.75
Jean-Raphaël Sandri	FN	4,057	17.50		
Anais Beltran	FI	2,821	12.17		
Bastien Faudot	PS	2,110	9.10		
Philippe Legros	DIV	431	1.86		
Sabine Verdant	PCF	334	1.44		
Christiane Petitot	EXG	243	1.05		
Jonathan Vallart	DIV	175	0.75		
Mustafa Cetin	DIV	139	0.60		
Romain Lagache	DIV	0	0.00		
Votes		23,182	100.00	18,541	100.00
Valid votes		23,182	97.35	18,541	87.59
Blank votes		430	1.81	1,840	8.69
Null votes		200	0.84	788	3.72
Turnout		23,812	49.74	21,169	44.25
Abstentions		24,061	50.26	26,669	55.75
Registered voters		47,873		47,838	
Source: Ministry of the Interior

=== 2012 ===
Candidate	Label	First round		Second round	
Candidate	Label	Votes	%	Votes	%
Damien Meslot	UMP	11,318	40.23	15,344	56.22
Anne-Marie Forcinal	PS	8,822	31.36	11,949	43.78
Marc Archambault	FN	4,298	15.28		
Jacques Rambur	FG	1,145	4.07		
Eva Pedrocchi	EELV	936	3.33		
Renaud Rousselet	MoDem	667	2.37		
Saïd Meftah El Khaïr	PRG	293	1.04		
Gérard Cretin	EXD	245	0.87		
Jean-Christophe Muringer	DVD	239	0.85		
Christiane Petitot	EXG	170	0.60		
Claude Larger	AUT	0	0.00		
Votes		28,133	100.00	27,293	100.00
Valid votes		28,133	98.58	27,293	96.20
Blank or null votes		406	1.42	1,079	3.80
Turnout		28,539	60.48	28,372	60.13
Abstentions		18,648	39.52	18,813	39.87
Registered voters		47,187		47,185	
Source: Ministry of the Interior

=== 2007 ===
Legislative Election 2007: Territoire de Belfort's 1st constituency
Party	Candidate	Votes	%	±%
UMP	Damien Meslot	14,044	49.99	
PS	Anne-Marie Forcinal	6,748	24.02	
MoDem	Christophe Grudler	2,435	8.67	
FN	Robert Sennerich	1,297	4.62	
LV	Anny Morel-Grunblatt	964	3.43	
Far left	Elisabeth Adalla	695	2.47	
Others	N/A	1,911		
Turnout		28,697	61.39	
2nd round result
UMP	Damien Meslot	16,478	58.66	
PS	Anne-Marie Forcinal	11,612	41.34	
Turnout		29,277	62.63	
UMP hold				

=== 2002 ===
Legislative Election 2002: Territoire de Belfort's 1st constituency
Party	Candidate	Votes	%	±%
UMP	Damien Meslot	10,739	37.78	
PS	Raymond Forni	9,732	34.24	
FN	Yolande Pflieger	4,107	14.45	
PR	Jackie Drouet	1,604	5.64	
Others	N/A	2,243		
Turnout		29,231	66.46	
2nd round result
UMP	Damien Meslot	14,770	53.23	
PS	Raymond Forni	12,979	46.77	
Turnout		29,186	66.38	
UMP gain from PS				

=== 1997 ===
Legislative Election 2007:
Party	Candidate	Votes	%	±%
PS	Raymond Forni	8,789	32.04	
RPR	Jean Rosselot	7,992	29.13	
FN	Christophe Vuillemin	5,008	18.26	
LV	Louis Teknayan	1,366	4.98	
PCF	Arlette Clerc	1,346	4.91	
LO	Eliane Lacaille	899	3.28	
DVD	Jean-Michel Glon-Villeneuve	727	2.65	
GE	Philippe Freyburger	648	2.36	
Others	N/A	658		
Turnout		29,036	69.74	
2nd round result
PS	Raymond Forni	14,762	51.52	
RPR	Jean Rosselot	13,890	48.48	
Turnout		31,056	74.61	
PS gain from RPR				
