= Florian Chauche =

French politician (born 1984)

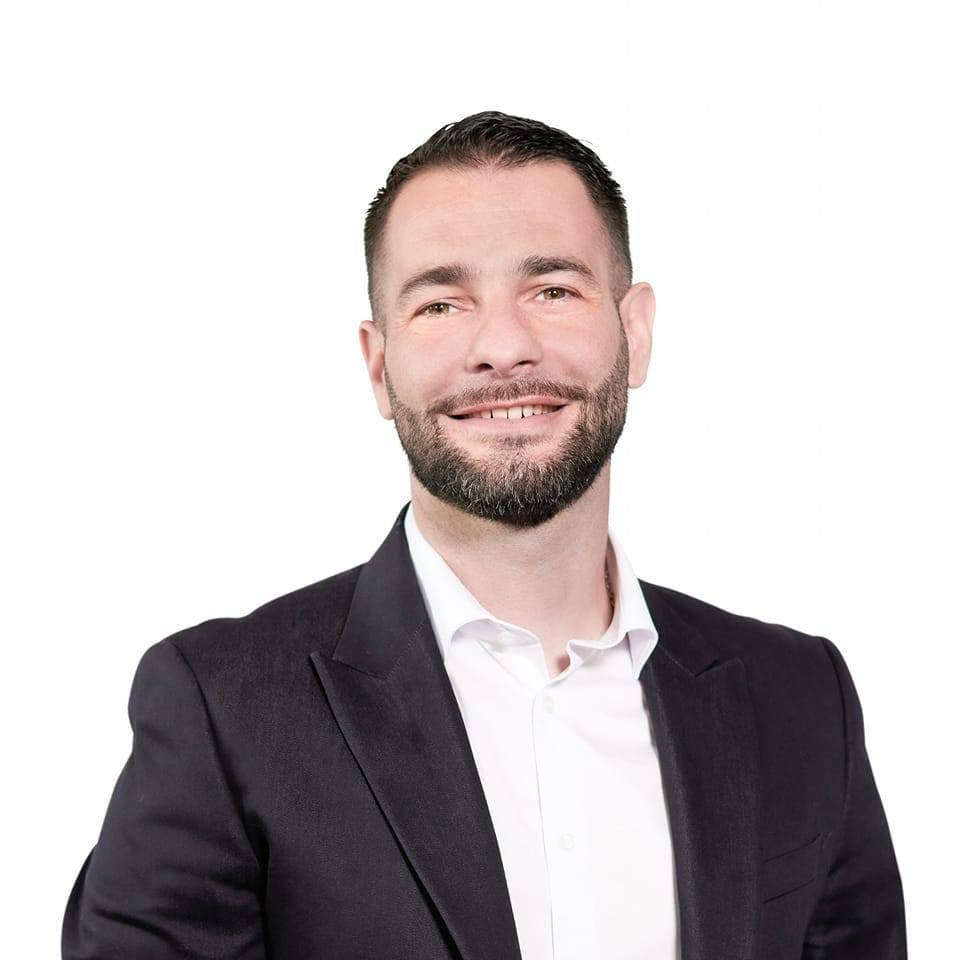

Member of the National Assembly for Territoire de Belfort's 2nd constituency
- In office 22 June 2022 – 9 June 2024
- Preceded by: Michel Zumkeller
- Succeeded by: Guillaume Bigot

Personal details
- Born: 22 January 1984 (age 42) Belfort, France
- Party: La France Insoumise
- Other political affiliations: NUPES (2022); NFP (2024)

Florian Chauche (born 22 January 1984) is a French politician of La France Insoumise who represented Territoire de Belfort's 2nd constituency in the National Assembly from 2022 to 2024. On 17 June, while campaigning in the 2024 French legislative election, decried physical attacks and the usage of racist slurs against his supporters.

== Biography ==
A candidate in the 2022 legislative elections in the 2nd constituency of the Territoire de Belfort, he faces Sophie Carnicer, the National Rally candidate known for “making a fool of herself” during a Talk show, in the second round. Narrowly elected against Carnicer, he was then the only left-wing deputy from Franche-Comté in the 16th legislature.

In 2024, just two years after his election, he was defeated in the second round by his rival Guillaume Bigot (politician) of the National Rally by a few hundred votes.

During this campaign, he was notably targeted by a complaint for “defamation and public insult” after calling his opponent a racist in one of his leaflets.

== See also ==
- List of deputies of the 16th National Assembly of France
