= Ian Boucard =

French politician (born 1988)

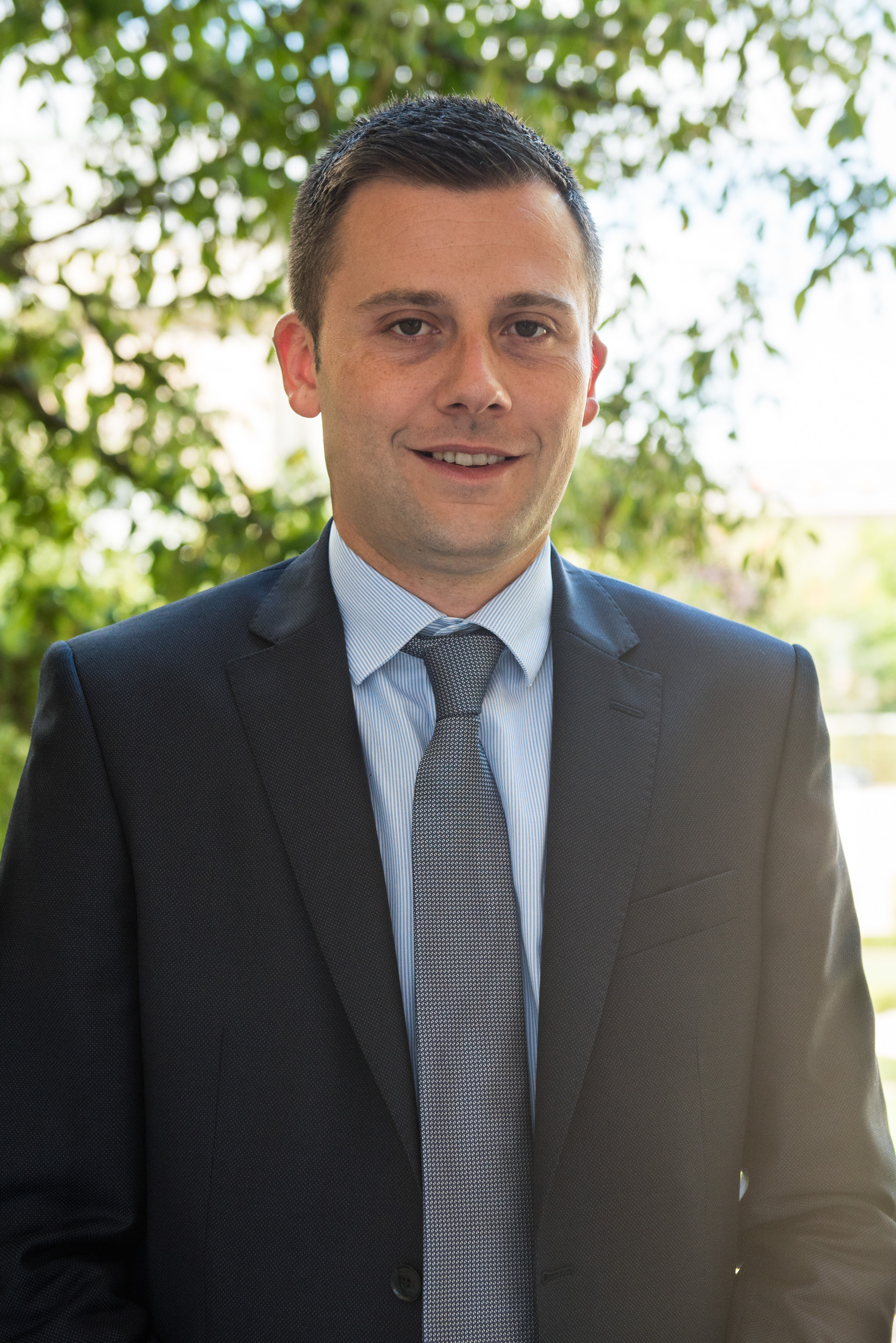
- Boucard in 2017

Member of the National Assembly for Territoire de Belfort's 1st constituency
- Incumbent
- Assumed office 5 February 2018
- Preceded by: Himself
- In office 21 June 2017 – 8 December 2017
- Preceded by: Damien Meslot
- Succeeded by: Himself

Personal details
- Born: 5 May 1988 (age 38) Belfort, France
- Party: The Republicans (2015–present)
- Other political affiliations: Democratic Movement (2008–2009); Union for a Popular Movement (2009–2015)
- Education: ESC Dijon Bourgogne
- Ian Boucard's voice Recorded on 17 June 2023

Ian Boucard (born 5 May 1988) is a French politician who has represented the 1st constituency of the Territoire de Belfort department in the National Assembly since February 2018, previously holding the seat from June to December 2017. A member of The Republicans (LR), the Constitutional Council nullified his first election, a decision that triggered a by-election in early 2018 in which he was reelected.

== Early life and professional career ==
Ian Boucard was born on 5 May 1988 in Belfort, Territoire de Belfort, to a 19-year-old mother who temporarily suspended her studies in order to raise him. Initially raised in the Résidences district in his first few years, he grew up in the Dardel district, and was educated in public schools in Belfort, at the École élémentaire publique Les Barrès, Collège Léonard de Vinci, and Lycée Condorcet, taking preparatory classes for business school at the Lycée Courbet. He started coaching youth teams at ASM Belfort at the age of 15, and has continued to supervise teams across all youth age groups since then, including during his studies and professional career, which allowed him to secure an internship at L'Oréal. He studied at the ESC Dijon Bourgogne for two years, and subsequently entered the supermarket sector, employed by Unilever and Super U. He was the official announcer for ASM Belfort at its home stadium Stade Roger-Serzian during Championnat National 2 matches from 2012 to 2017.

== Political career ==
Boucard first became involved in politics in 2007, after being invited by a friend part of the Union for a Popular Movement (UMP) to a meeting with Damien Meslot. Two months later, he accepted an invitation by the same friend to join Meslot's list in the 2008 municipal elections in Belfort under the label of the Democratic Movement (MoDem), at position 37 of 45 on the UMP list, which was defeated in the second round a three-way election against the Citizen and Republican Movement (MRC) list led by Étienne Butzbach which won with 48.27% of the vote, compared to 38.06% for the UMP list led by Meslot and 13.67% for the miscellaneous right list supported by the MoDem led by Christophe Grudler, who refused to merge his list with Meslot's after the first round.

He became a member of the UMP in 2009, at the age of 20, and was employed by Meslot as a parliamentary assistant starting in 2013. In the 2014 municipal elections, Boucard once again joined the UMP list led by Meslot and was nominated for spot 7 of 45. Meslot won by a large margin in the second round after Christophe Grudler withdrew following the first round, securing 47.38% of the vote against the Socialist Party (PS) list led by Etienne Butzbach with 31.96% of the vote, the National Front (FN) list led by Marc Archambault with 10.43% of the vote, and the MRC list led by Bastien Faudot with 10.21% of the vote. It was the first time in 37 years that the city was won by the right, having been governed by the left since 1977. As municipal councillor, he was charged with the children, youth and associative life portfolio, and as vice president of the agglomeration community of Grand Belfort, received the housing and urban policy portfolio. He was also an administrator at the office of public housing and public works company of Territoire de Belfort.

He was selected as a UMP alternate in the 2015 departmental elections within the canton of Belfort 3, but MoDem candidates Julie de Breza and Christophe Grudler defeated the UMP ticket of Florence Besancenot and Damien Meslot in the second round, receiving 53.50% of the vote against their opponents with 46.50% of the vote. In April 2016, Boucard was designated departmental secretary of The Republicans (LR) in Territoire de Belfort.

On 6 November 2016, Meslot confirmed that he would not seek a fourth mandate in the National Assembly, and Boucard was subsequently confirmed as the LR candidate in Territoire de Belfort's 1st constituency in the 2017 legislative elections a week later. He was officially invested as a candidate by the party on 14 January 2017. Although Meslot chose not to run for re-election and instead remain mayor of Belfort, he was still chosen as Boucard's alternate. In the first round on 11 June, Boucard came in second with 23.70% of the vote, with Christophe Grudler, candidate of the MoDem supported by La République En Marche! coming in first with 31.83% of valid votes. Boucard and Grudler advanced to the second round and the other candidates were eliminated; Jean-Raphaël Sandri of the National Front received 17.50% of votes, Anaïs Beltran of La France Insoumise secured 12.17%, and Bastien Faudot of the PS and MRC garnered 9.10%.

=== Member of the National Assembly, 2017–present ===
Boucard was elected in the second round on 18 June with 50.75% of the vote, narrowly beating Grudler by 279 votes. He officially took his seat on 21 June with the inauguration of the 15th legislature, joining the LR group and serving on the National Defence and Armed Forces Committee.

On the evening of the second round, Christophe Grudler, defeated by 279 votes, announced that he would file an appeal to the Constitutional Council challenging the election, accusing Boucard of electoral manipulation by distributing unsigned electoral leaflets purportedly from La France Insoumise and the National Front. The appeal succeeded, and the election of Boucard was invalidated on 8 December, triggering a by-election, scheduled for 28 January and 4 February 2018. At a public meeting on 18 January 2018, Boucard announced that he decided to sue Christophe Grudler, who called him a "cheater" and "fraudster" for his tactics in the June 2017 legislative elections, for defamation. At the hearing on 25 January, Boucard's lawyer contended that leaflets distributed by Grudler's campaign, accusing Boucard of "outright electoral fraud" and a "robbery", were "defamatory and injurious". Boucard and Meslot seek €500 in damages in the case, which was dismissed on 8 February, after the by-election. Boucard and Meslot were ordered to pay Grudler €1,000 and cover legal costs associated with the case. In the first round of the by-election, Boucard secured 39.02% of the vote against 26.67% for Grudler, and was re-elected in the second round with 58.93% of the vote, and returned to the National Assembly on 5 February.

Boucard endorsed Christian Jacob as the party’s chairman in the run-up to the Republicans’ 2019 convention, and later supported Éric Ciotti’s candidacy to succeed Jacob in 2022.
