= Damien Meslot =

French politician

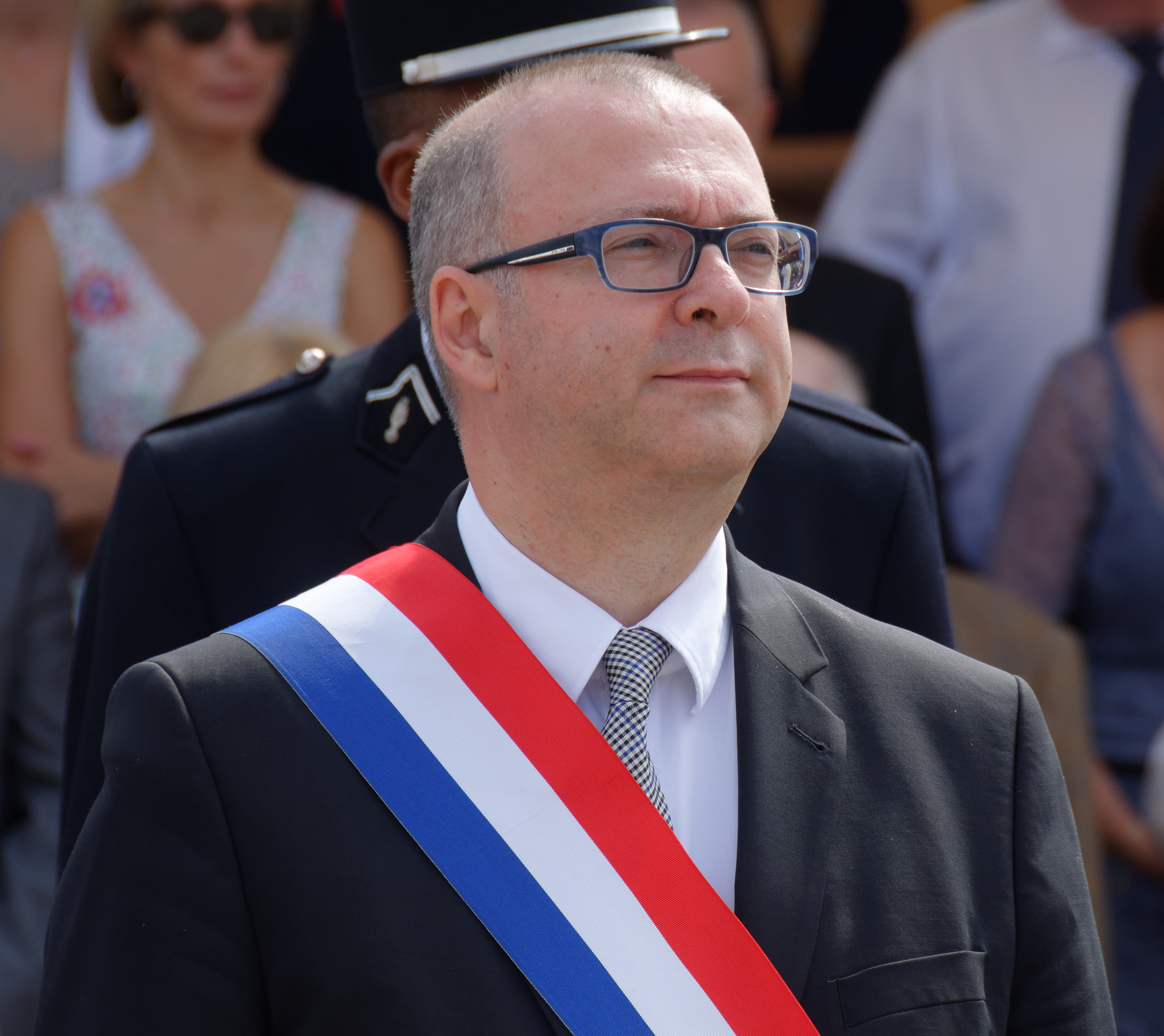
- Meslot in 2015

Mayor of Belfort
- Incumbent
- Assumed office 4 April 2014
- Preceded by: Étienne Butzbach

Member of the National Assembly for Territoire de Belfort's 1st constituency
- In office 19 June 2002 – 20 June 2017
- Preceded by: Raymond Forni
- Succeeded by: Ian Boucard

Personal details
- Born: 11 November 1964 (age 61) Belfort, France
- Party: The Republicans
- Damien Meslot's voice Recorded on 17 June 2023

Damien Meslot (born 11 November 1964 in Belfort) is a French politician and a member of The Republicans. He represented Territoire de Belfort's 1st constituency in the National Assembly from 2002 to 2017, and has served as the mayor of Belfort since 2014.
