= Results of the 2024 French legislative election in Martinique =

Following the first round of the 2024 French legislative election on 30 June 2024, runoff elections in each constituency where no candidate received a vote share greater than 50 percent were scheduled for 7 July. Candidates permitted to stand in the runoff elections needed to either come in first or second place in the first round or achieve more than 12.5 percent of the votes of the entire electorate (as opposed to 12.5 percent of the vote share due to low turnout).

== Martinique ==
=== 1st constituency ===
Candidate	Party or alliance		First round		Second round	
Candidate	Party or alliance		Votes	%	Votes	%
Jiovanny William	Regionalists	Péyi-A	13,095	56.56	18,552	81.97
Philippe Edmond-Mariette	Regionalists	Build the Martinique Country	3,106	13.42	4,081	18.03
Alain-Claude Lagier	New Popular Front	Miscellaneous left	2,690	11.62		
Cédric Crampon	National Rally		2,312	9.99		
Gabriel Jean-Marie	Far-left	Lutte Ouvrière	665	2.87		
Yann Mievilly	Ecologists	Independent	599	2.59		
Sylvain Hoche	Miscellaneous right	Independent	584	2.52		
Fabrice Fiari	Independent		100	0.43		
Total			23,151	100.00	22,633	100.00
Valid votes			23,151	94.36	22,633	92.74
Invalid votes			615	2.51	728	2.98
Blank votes			768	3.13	1,043	4.27
Total votes			24,534	100.00	24,404	100.00
Registered voters/turnout			80,328	30.54	80,342	30.38

=== 2nd constituency ===
Candidate	Party or alliance		First round		Second round	
Candidate	Party or alliance		Votes	%	Votes	%
Marcellin Nadeau	New Popular Front	Péyi-A	12,017	48.31	17,230	65.68
Yan Monplaisir	Miscellaneous right	Independent	6,732	27.06	9,003	34.32
Juvénal Remir	National Rally		2,614	10.51		
Christian Rapha	Miscellaneous right	Independent	1,888	7.59		
Alexandre Ventadour	Miscellaneous left	Independent	1,626	6.54		
Total			24,877	100.00	26,233	100.00
Valid votes			24,877	94.60	26,233	94.65
Invalid votes			641	2.44	672	2.42
Blank votes			778	2.96	812	2.93
Total votes			26,296	100.00	27,717	100.00
Registered voters/turnout			79,675	33.00	79,665	34.79

=== 3rd constituency ===
Candidate	Party or alliance		First round		Second round	
Candidate	Party or alliance		Votes	%	Votes	%
Johnny Hajjar	Miscellaneous left	Martinican Progressive Party (Note: Dissident who ran without the support of the New Popular Front)	6,626	37.28	8,541	45.47
Béatrice Bellay	New Popular Front	Socialist Party	4,489	25.26	10,243	54.53
Francis Carole	Regionalists	Independent	2,617	14.72		
Max Ferraty	National Rally		1,684	9.47		
Nathalie Jos	Regionalists	Independent	1,010	5.68		
Frédérique Dispagne	Miscellaneous left	Independent	624	3.51		
Mélanie Sulio	Far-left	Lutte Ouvrière	363	2.04		
Emmanuel Granier	Miscellaneous right	Independent	361	2.03		
Total			17,774	100.00	18,784	100.00
Valid votes			17,774	94.66	18,784	93.66
Invalid votes			417	2.22	488	2.43
Blank votes			585	3.12	783	3.90
Total votes			18,776	100.00	20,055	100.00
Registered voters/turnout			60,258	31.16	60,260	33.28

=== 4th constituency ===
Candidate	Party or alliance		First round		Second round	
Candidate	Party or alliance		Votes	%	Votes	%
Jean-Philippe Nilor	New Popular Front	Péyi-A	15,405	63.18	21,620	86.58
Grégory Michel Roy-Larentry	National Rally		2,408	9.88	3,350	13.42
Philippe Petit	Union of Democrats and Independents		2,316	9.50		
Louis Boutrin	Ecologists	Independent	1,538	6.31		
Aude Goussard	Regionalists	Independent	1,294	5.31		
Yvette Galot	Miscellaneous left	Independent	824	3.38		
Karine Therese	The Ecologists		599	2.46		
Total			24,384	100.00	24,970	100.00
Valid votes			24,384	95.79	24,970	93.66
Invalid votes			471	1.85	687	2.58
Blank votes			601	2.36	1,003	3.76
Total votes			25,456	100.00	26,660	100.00
Registered voters/turnout			84,422	30.15	84,423	31.58
