= Josette Manin =

Martinque politician

Deputy for Martinique's 1st constituency in National Assembly of France
- In office 21 June 2017 – 21 June 2022
- Preceded by: Alfred Marie-Jeanne
- Succeeded by: Jiovanny William

President of the General Council of Martinique
- In office 31 March 2011 – 31 December 2015
- Preceded by: Claude Lise
- Succeeded by: General Council abolished (Note: The General Council of Martinique was replaced by the Assembly of Martinique, chaired by Claude Lise.)

Personal details
- Born: 16 March 1950 (age 75) Le Lamentin
- Party: Build the Martinique Country

Josette Manin (born 16 March 1950, Le Lamentin) is a French politician on the island of Martinique. She was the last President of the General Council of Martinique, from 31 March 2011 to 31 December 2015, and was the representative of Martinique's 1st constituency in the National Assembly from 2017 to 2022. She was the first woman to be elected President of the General Council and as a deputy for Martinique in the French National Assembly.

In March 2022, she announced that she would not seek re-election in the 2022 French legislative election.

== Career ==
In 1983, Manin joined the Martinican Communist Party and became a militant under Georges Gratiant. She began her political career the same year, being elected as a municipal councilor in Le Lamentin. When she was reelected in 1995, she joined Pierre-Jean Samot, then the mayor of Le Lamentin, in the Lamentin Horizon 2001 - développement, solidarité, justice project. Three years later, she left the Communist Party and joined Samot's Build the Martinique Country party. In 2001, Manin was elected councilor general in Le Lamentin 3rd Canton Est and assistant mayor of the city.

=== Presidency of the general council ===
In March 2011, Manin was selected to be the President of the General Council candidate for the Ensemble, pour une Martinique nouvelle bloc, composed of the Build the Martinique Country party, Martinican Progressive Party, Franciscan People's Movement, Socialist Federation of Martinique, and theVivre à Schoelcher movement. In the third round of the election process, Manin narrowly defeated Alfred Sinosa, becoming the first female President of the General Council in Martinique, and the second in the Caribbean, to hold the position. She also became the last President, as the French government, in December 2015, merged the regional and general councils for the island into one assembly with the formation of the territorial collective of Martinique.

=== National Assembly ===
In the 2017 legislative election, Manin was elected to the National Assembly to represent Martinique alongside Bruno Nestor Azerot, Serge Letchimy, and Jean-Philippe Nilor.

Manin has spoken in the National Assembly about the plight of West Indies Amerindians poisoned by kepone and criticized the French government for cutting jobs in education on Martinique.
