= Émile Maurice =

President of the General Council of Martinique
- In office 1970–1992

Mayor of Saint-Joseph
- In office 1959–1993

Personal details
- Born: July 8, 1910 Le François
- Died: January 13, 1993 (aged 82)
- Resting place: Saint-Joseph, Martinique

Émile Maurice (8 July 1910 – 13 January 1993) was a French politician and a supporter of Martinique's assimilation to France. He was President of the General Council of Martinique from 1970 to 1992.

== Biography ==
Émile Maurice began his political career in 1957 when he was elected general councillor of Saint-Joseph. He was a co-founder of the Martinican Progressive Party with Aimé Césaire in 1958. He was elected mayor of Saint-Joseph in 1959, which he remained until his death in 1993.

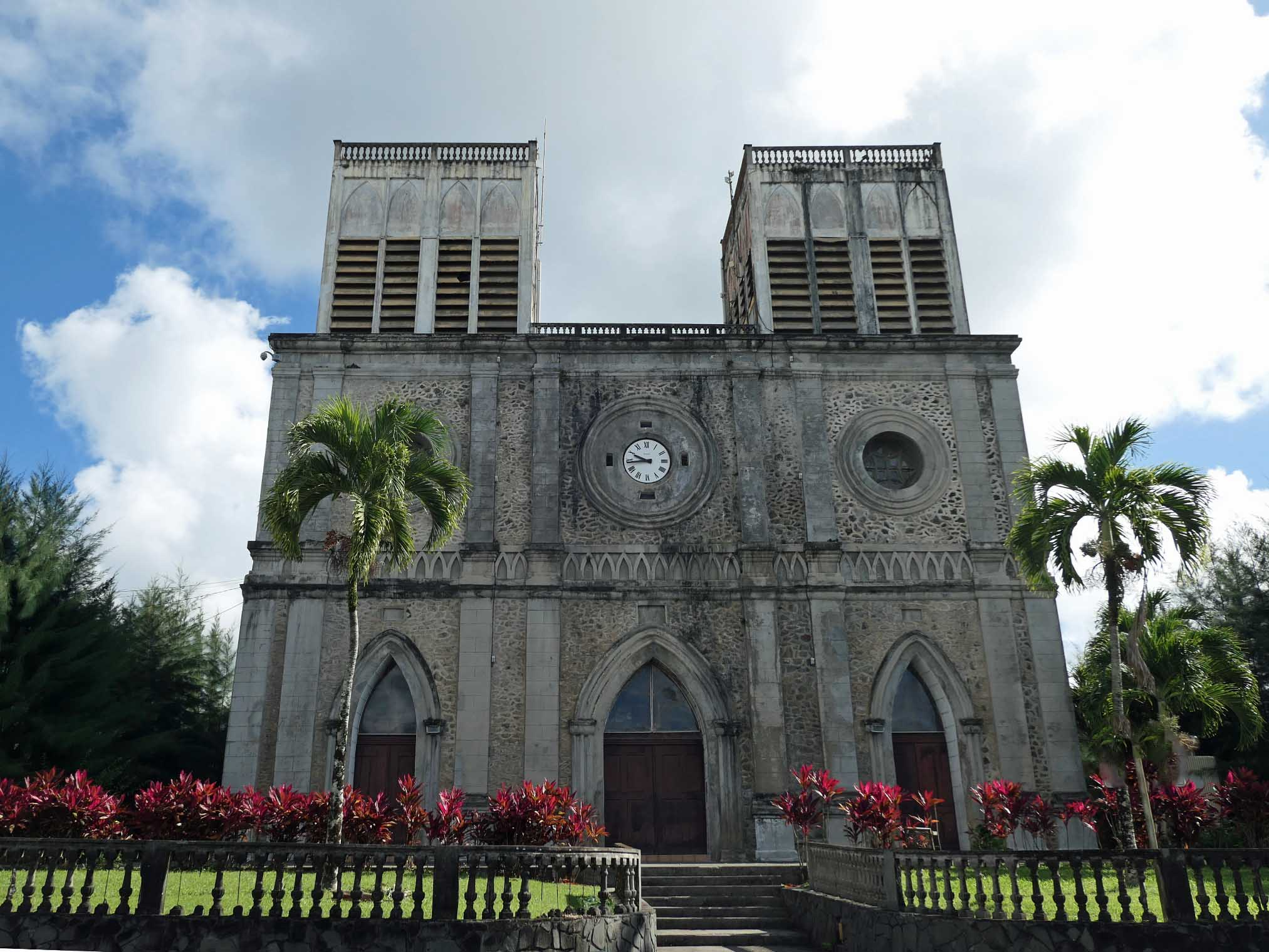
Church of Saint-Joseph in Saint-Joseph, Martinique

In 1958, Maurice, who was a Gaullist, finding he disagreed with Aimé Césaire, left the PPM and joined the Union for the New Republic federation of Martinique. From then on, Émile Maurice opposed autonomism and, with Camille Petit and Victor Sablé, was one of the fiercest defenders of departmental status for Martinique.

He was president of the Rally for the Republic federation of Martinique for several years, and known as a pillar of the party.

=== Memorials ===
A chamber in the High Council of Martinique's assembly building, the Hôtel de la collectivité territoriale de Martinique in Fort-de-France, is named after him.

A bust was dedicated to him in Saint-Joseph, and a street in Fort-de-France.
