= Val-de-Marne's 4th constituency =

Constituency of the National Assembly of France

4th constituency of Val-de-Marne
- inline Constituency of the National Assembly of France

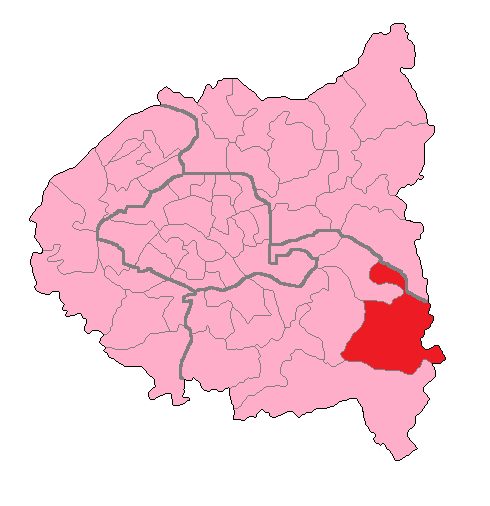
- Val-de-Marne's 4th Constituency shown within Île-de-France
- Deputy: Maud Petit; MoDem
- Department: Val-de-Marne
- Cantons: Chennevières-sur-Marne - Ormesson-sur-Marne - Sucy-en-Brie - Villiers-sur-Marne
- Registered voters: 71,848

The 4th constituency of Val-de-Marne is a French legislative constituency in the Val-de-Marne département.

== Description ==
The 4th constituency of Val-de-Marne lies in the east of the constituency, bordering Seine-et-Marne to the east.

In its current incarnation the seat consistently supported conservative candidates until 2017. At the 2012 election Jacques-Alain Bénisti of the UMP was returned with a majority of just 74 votes.

== Historic Representation ==
Election	Member	Party
1967	Alain Griotteray	RI
1968	Alain Griotteray	RI
1973	Joseph Franceschi	PS
1978	Joseph Franceschi	PS
1981	Joseph Franceschi	PS
1986	Proportional representation – no election by constituency	
1988	Jean-Jacques Jégou	UDF
1993	Jean-Jacques Jégou	UDF
1997	Jean-Jacques Jégou	UDF
2002	Jacques-Alain Bénisti	UMP
2007	Jacques-Alain Bénisti	UMP
2012	Jacques-Alain Bénisti	UMP
2017	Maud Petit	MoDem
2022	Maud Petit	MoDem

== Election results ==
=== 2024 ===
Legislative Election 2024: Val-de-Marne's 4th constituency
Party	Candidate	Votes	%	±%
LO	Brigitte Moulin	557	1.11	
MoDem (Ensemble)	Maud Petit	15,287	30.58	
DIV	Jean Dambreville	293	0.59	
RN	Alain Philippet	13,474	26.95	
DLF	Soraya Benslimane	624	1.25	
LFI (NFP)	Adal Amara	16,505	33.02	
REC	Michaël Bohbot	594	1.19	
DVD	Bernard Chaussegros	1,292	2.58	
DVC	Marie-Odile Perru	820	1.64	
REG	Maxence Sobral	543	1.09	
Turnout		49,989	97.61	
Registered electors		74,883		
2nd round result
MoDem	Maud Petit	18,454	36.63	
LFI	Adel Amara	18,140	36.00	
RN	Alain Philippet	13,789	27.37	
Turnout		50,383	97.99	
Registered electors		74,910		
MoDem hold				

=== 2022 ===
Legislative Election 2022: Val-de-Marne's 4th constituency
Party	Candidate	Votes	%	±%
LFI (NUPÉS)	Mirabelle Lemaire	10,238	29.65	+7.84
MoDem (Ensemble)	Maud Petit	10,085	29.21	-11.16
LR (UDC)	Marie-Carole Ciuntu	5,760	16.68	−5.67
RN	Alain Philippet	4,679	13.55	+3.83
REC	Véronique Merlin	1,820	5.27	N/A
DVE	Isabelle Yvos	748	2.17	N/A
Others	N/A	1,197		
Turnout		35,221	47.57	−1.57
2nd round result
MoDem (Ensemble)	Maud Petit	18,050	55.98	+2.43
LFI (NUPÉS)	Mirabelle Lemaire	14,192	44.02	N/A
Turnout		32,242	46.57	+5.17
MoDem hold				

=== 2017 ===
Legislative Election 2017: Val-de-Merne's 4th constituency
Party	Candidate	Votes	%	±%
MoDem	Maud Petit	14,208	40.37	+37.38
LR	Marie-Carole Ciuntu	7,866	22.35	−12.30
LFI	Mirabelle Lemaire	4,215	11.98	N/A
FN	Jérôme Auvray	3,419	9.72	−3.18
PS	Zakaria Zaidane	1,471	4.18	−30.77
EELV	Samuel Szymanski	1,150	3.27	N/A
PCF	Corinne Charles	836	2.38	−4.08
Others	N/A	2,029		
Turnout		35,740	49.14	−7.15
2nd round result
MoDem	Maud Petit	14,625	53.55	N/A
LR	Marie-Carole Ciuntu	12,687	46.45	−3.64
Turnout		30,112	41.40	−13.25
MoDem gain from LR		Swing		

=== 2012 ===
Legislative Election 2012: Val-de-Marne's 4th constituency
Party	Candidate	Votes	%	±%
PS	Simonne Abraham-Thisse	14,138	34.95	+12.03
UMP	Jacques-Alain Bénisti	14,014	34.65	−3.28
FN	Philippe Oribes	5,218	12.90	+9.25
FG	Irène Basle-Midy	2,612	6.46	+2.73
MoDem	Fernaud Ferrier	1,208	2.99	N/A
DVE	Patrick Mesle	1,032	2.55	N/A
DIV	Georges Spido	851	2.10	N/A
Others	N/A	1,371		
Turnout		40,447	56.29	−4.37
2nd round result
UMP	Jacques-Alain Bénisti	19,670	50.09	−6.52
PS	Simonne Abraham-Thisse	19,596	49.91	+6.52
Turnout		39,266	54.65	−0.74
UMP hold				

=== 2007 ===
Legislative Election 2007: Val-de-Marne's 4th constituency
Party	Candidate	Votes	%	±%
UMP	Jacques-Alain Bénisti	15,910	37.93	+8.55
PS	Simone Abraham-Thisse	9,617	22.92	−1.62
DVD	Marie-Carole Ciuntu	8,897	21.21	N/A
LV	Gérard Sauzet	1,829	4.36	+1.25
PCF	Mauricette Velain	1,564	3.73	+0.50
FN	Philippe Oribes	1,533	3.65	−6.35
Far left	Florence Marquet	1,109	2.64	N/A
Others	N/A	1,491		
Turnout		42,621	60.66	−6.44
2nd round result
UMP	Jacques-Alain Bénisti	21,219	56.61	−2.46
PS	Simone Abraham-Thisse	16,266	43.39	+2.46
Turnout		38,917	55.39	−5.59
UMP hold				

=== 2002 ===
Legislative Election 2002: Val-de-Marne's 4th constituency
Party	Candidate	Votes	%	±%
UMP	Jacques-Alain Bénisti	12,497	29.38	N/A
PS	Michele Sabban	10,436	24.54	+0.32
UDF	Jean-Jacques Jégou	9,678	22.75	−5.87
FN	Patrick Mennessier L'Henoret	4,235	10.00	−5.86
PCF	Mauricette Velain	1,375	3.23	−3.87
LV	Josette Sauvage	1,322	3.11	−0.81
PR	Georges Spido	1,092	2.57	N/A
Others	N/A	1,880		
Turnout		43,084	67.10	−0.94
2nd round result
UMP	Jacques-Alain Bénisti	22,255	59.07	N/A
PS	Michele Sabban	15,421	40.93	−5.27
Turnout		39,159	60.98	−11.07
UMP gain from UDF				

=== 1997 ===
Legislative Election 1997: Val-de-Marne's 4th constituency
Party	Candidate	Votes	%	±%
UDF	Jean-Jacques Jégou	11,575	28.62	
PS	Michèle Ville	9,795	24.22	
FN	Lydia Schenardi	6,415	15.86	
DVD	Olivier d'Ormesson	3,797	9.39	
PCF	Jean-Jacques Hedouin	2,872	7.10	
LV	Gilles Desseigne	1,585	3.92	
GE	Georges-Horace Spido	1,560	3.86	
LO	Daniel Demarque	1,099	2.72	
Others	N/A	1,741		
Turnout		41,975	68.04	
2nd round result
UDF	Jean-Jacques Jégou	22,644	53.80	
PS	Michèle Ville	19,447	46.20	
Turnout		44,447	72.05	
UDF hold				

== Sources ==
Official results of French elections from 2002: "Résultats électoraux officiels en France" (in French).
