= Béatrice Bellay =

French politician (born 1975)

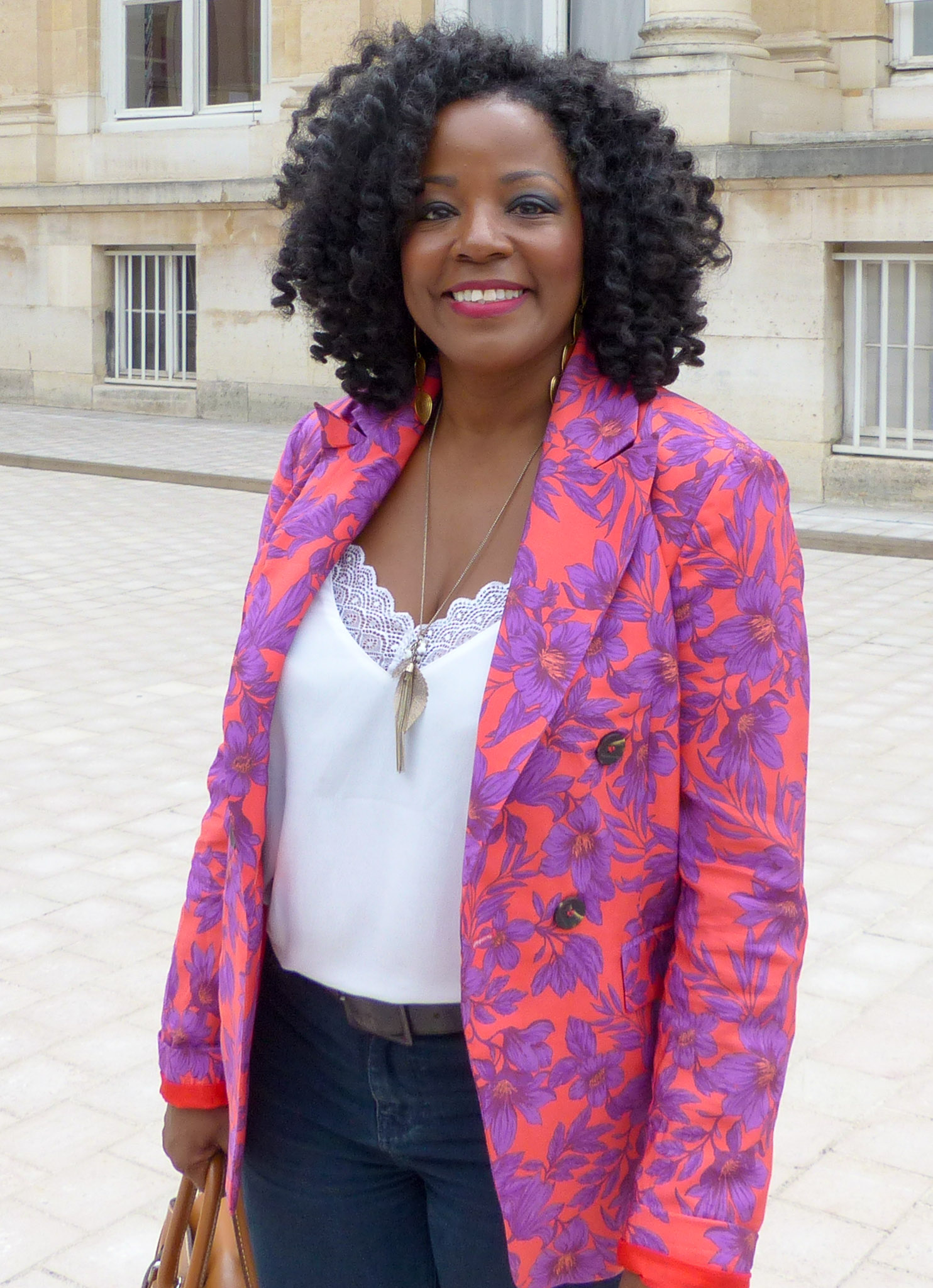

Member of the French National Assembly for Martinique's 3rd constituency
- Incumbent
- Assumed office 18 July 2024
- Preceded by: Johnny Hajjar

Personal details
- Born: 25 July 1975 (age 51) Villepinte, France
- Party: Socialist Federation of Martinique
- Other political affiliations: Socialist Party
- Education: Sorbonne University

Béatrice Bellay (born 25 July 1975) is a French politician in the overseas department of Martinique. Bellay was elected to serve as a member of the National Assembly for Martinique's 3rd constituency in 2024. She has served as leader of the Socialist Federation of Martinique, the Socialist Party's federation in Martinique, since 2018.

== Early life and education ==
Bellay was born in Villepinte, Seine-Saint-Denis, Metropolitan France to Martinican parents on 25 July 1975. She studied law and management at Paris Sorbonne University's Faculty of Law and Management. As a young person, she stated that Angela Davis was a role model. She joined the Socialist Party (PS) at age 23, and moved to Martinique at the age of 24 in 1999.

== Government career ==
In 2001, she became HR director for the government of the commune of Schœlcher. She became head of the legal office at the transport department for the Department of Martinique. She became director of population services of the communauté d'agglomération de l'Espace Sud de la Martinique in 2019.

Bellay has served as leader of the Socialist Federation of Martinique, Martinique's branch of the Socialist Party, since 2018. In 2020, she became National Secretary for Real Equality for the Socialist Party.

She was a candidate for the European Parliament in 2019, serving as fourteenth on the Socialist Party (PS) list led by Raphaël Glucksmann. In 2021, she was a candidate for Regional Council of Martinique.

Bellay unsuccessfully contested Martinique's 1st constituency in the National Assembly in the 2022 election. She ultimately received 7.8% of the vote in the first round, and did not qualify for the runoff election.

=== Member of the National Assembly (2024-present) ===
In 2024, she was elected to represent Martinique's 3rd constituency in the National Assembly. She defeated incumbent MP Johnny Hajjar of the Martinican Progressive Party by around 1,700 votes. Her substitute is Nadia Chonville.

Her victory made her the second woman to serve as a member of the National Assembly from Martinique, after Josette Manin, who was elected in 2017.
