= Camille Petit (politician) =

French politician (1912–1993)

Deputy to the National Assembly
- In office 1967–1986
- Preceded by: Joseph Pernock
- Constituency: Martinique's 1st constituency

President of the Regional Council of Martinique
- In office 1974 – 1983
- Succeeded by: Aimé Césaire

Mayor of Sainte-Marie
- In office 1967–1983
- Succeeded by: Guy Lordinot

Personal details
- Born: April 2, 1912 Saint-Esprit, Martinique
- Died: August 2, 1993 (aged 81) Paris
- Resting place: Cimetière parisien de Bagneux
- Party: National Centre of Social Republicans, Union for the New Republic, Union of Democrats for the Republic, Rally for the Republic
- Profession: Physician

Camille Petit (2 April 1912 – 2 August 1993) was a French politician from Saint-Esprit, Martinique.

== Biography ==
=== Medical career and public health practice ===
Petit was a doctor by profession. After completing his studies at the Faculty of Medicine in Paris in 1938, he worked in a hospital in Fort-de-France and others in Paris. He was involved in setting up Martinique's "La Goutte de lait" (the drop of milk) project with the Union des Femmes de la Martinique (Women's Union of Martinique), which worked to give mothers access to more information about nutrition for babies.

=== Political career ===
In his political career, he pioneered the Gaullist movement in Martinique. In 1958, he participated in the official creation of the Union for the New Republic (UNR) of Martinique, a political party, he became departmental secretary from 1958 to 1965. From its creation, the UNR of Martinique fiercely defended the complete assimilation of Martinique to France and the status of an overseas department.

He was a great admirer of General de Gaulle and a convinced assimilationist, opposing Martinique's autonomists, who were in favor of Martinique's separation from France. Throughout his political career, he demonstrated an unwavering attachment to the French nation and to republican values.

He was one of the founding members of the Société d'histoire de la Martinique (Martinique History Society), in 1955. The history society established itself as an organisation which overcame the political, as can be seen in its offering interest to such differing personalities as Petit and his fellow society member, Aimé Césaire.

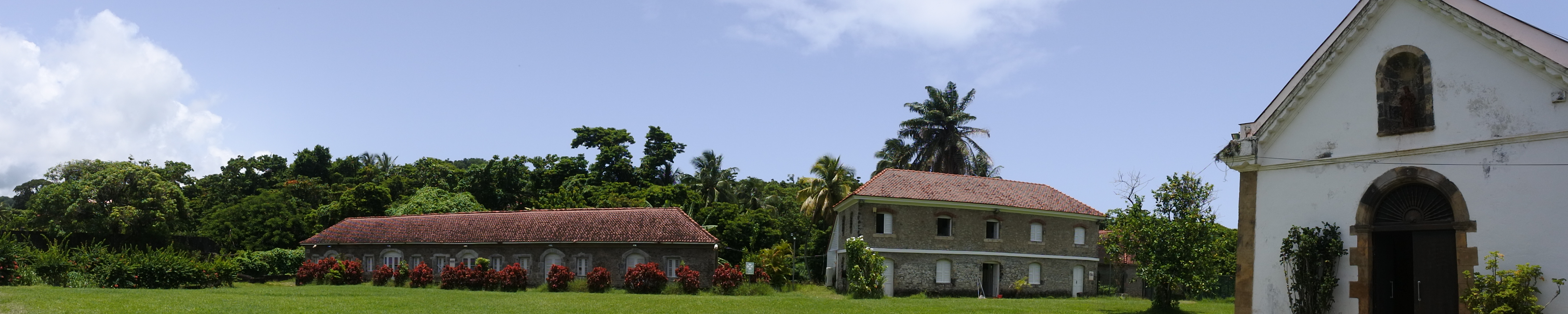
Fonds Saint-Jacques estate in 2017 - Father Labat's sugar factory, 17th century, warehouse, monastery, chapel

==== Mayor of Sainte-Marie ====
A longstanding mayor of Sainte-Marie, he oversaw a number of developments in the town between 1967 and 1983. Sainte Marie's housing stock was extensively rebuilt, gaining a new quarter (Villeneuve), several schools, market buildings, a medical and educational centre, town hall and stadium. He also arranged for the allocation of a plot of land to the SICA de Fonds Saint Jacques, which is now a historic site and cultural centre.

On 15 April 1982, he was re-elected president of the Regional Council of Martinique. He did not participate in the 1983 French municipal elections. Petit died at the age of 81 in Paris, after an illness; he is buried in the cemetery of Bagneux. He is the grandfather of Maud Petit, who represented Val-de-Marne as a member of the French National Assembly from 2017 to 2024.

== Terms of office ==
=== Local government ===
- 1953 - 1959 : City councillor of Fort-de-France
- 1959 - 1965 : Mayor of Grand'Rivière
- 12 February 1969 - 13 March 1983: Mayor of Sainte-Marie
- 1955 - 1959 : General councillor of the canton of Grand'Rivière
- 1959 - 1967 : General councillor of Fort-de-France 1st canton
- 1974 - 1983 : President of the Regional Council of Martinique

=== Parliamentary terms ===
- 5 March 1967 - 30 May 1968 : Deputy of Martinique's 1st constituency
- 23 June 1968 - 1 April 1973: Deputy of Martinique's 1st constituency
- 4 March 1973 - 2 April 1978: Deputy of Martinique's 1st constituency
- 12 March 1978 - 22 May 1981: Deputy of Martinique's 1st constituency
- 21 June 1981 - 1 April 1986: Deputy of Martinique's 1st constituency
