= Nadia Chonville =

Martinican author (born 1989)

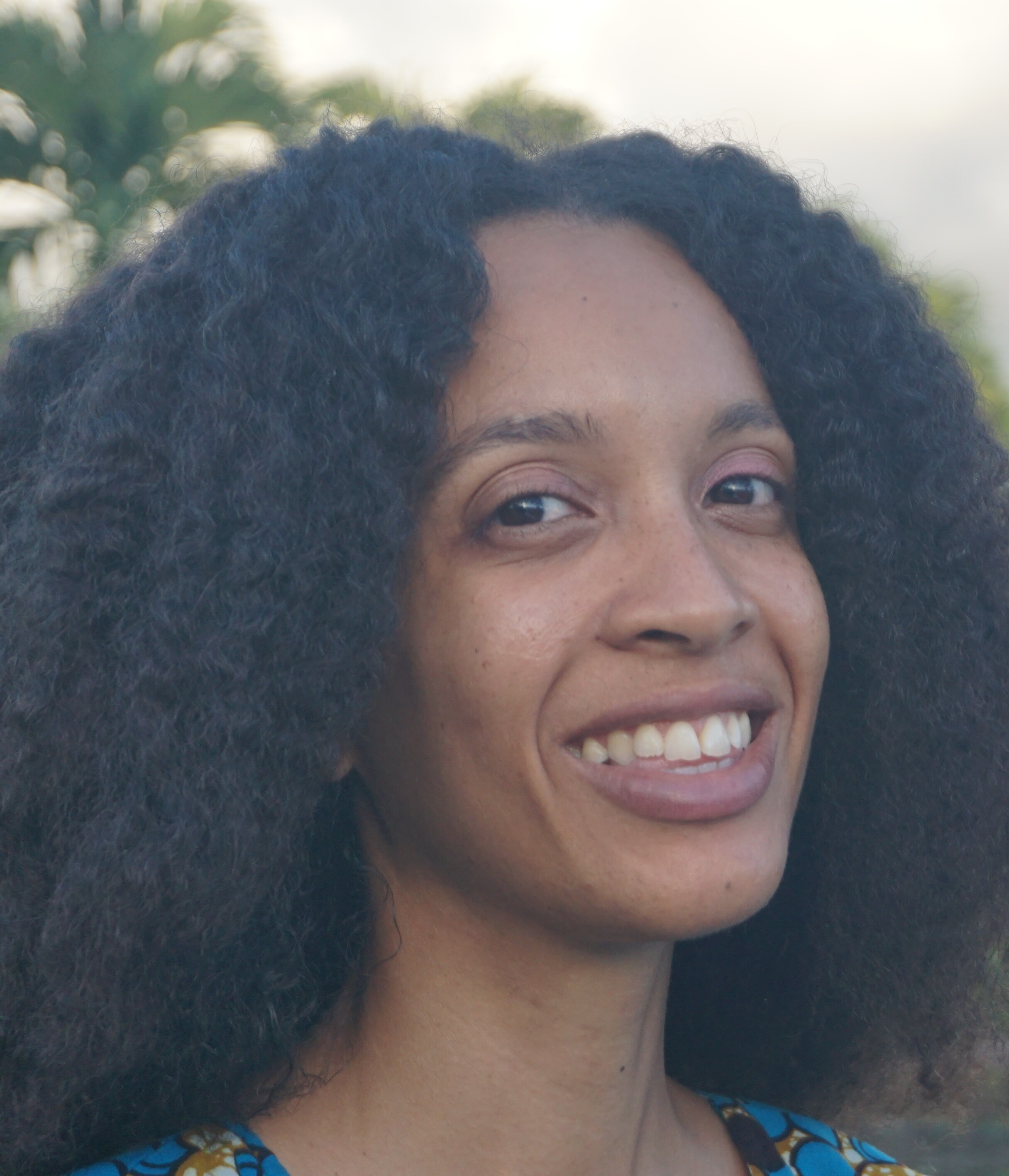
- Chonville in 2021
- Born: May 14, 1989 (age 37); Martinique
- Occupations: Writer; politician; sociologist
- Notable work: Rose de Wégastrie; Mon cœur bat vite

Nadia Chonville (born May 14, 1989) is a Martinican author, politician, and sociologist specializing in studying gender in Afro-Caribbean culture.

== Early life and education ==
Nadia Chonville is the daughter of a Martinican father and a Guadeloupean mother. She grew up in the countryside of the commune of Le François. She graduated from the Grenoble Institute of Political Studies in 2012 before earning a PhD in sociology from the University of the West Indies. She is a professor of history and geography at Lycée Victor-Schœlcher and studies issues such as homophobia and transphobia in Caribbean culture.

== Literary career ==
Chonville wrote her first story, titled Les amours d'un Chinois (lit. The Loves of a Chinese Man), at seven years old. In 2004 she won several literary prizes, including the René Maran Youth Prize.

She published her first novel in 2005, titled Rose de Wégastrie. The book follows an Andalusian Romani woman, accused of witchcraft, who discovers that she is actually a goddess from another planet. Rose de Wégastrie was the first novel in the Wégastrie trilogy, with the subsequent books releasing in 2014 and 2015. The series altogether sold over 100,000 copies in the West Indies.

In 2019 Chonville wrote the libretto for Cosmique, a musical piece by hip-hop artist Ven.

In 2023 she published a thriller novel titled Mon cœur bat vite (lit. My Heart Beats Fast). The novel tells the story of Kim, a trans man serial killer who killed his niece. The protagonist of the novel is his sister, Edith, who looks for answers by learning about her ancestors, who were a long line of witches. The novel was praised by Patrice Élie, a journalist for France Info, writing: "Nadia Chonville wants to show us that every person, whatever their identity, gender, skin color, sexuality is capable of the worst as well as the best. It claims a right to banality for all, in a way. Nevertheless, this is a type of character that is very little highlighted in literature, especially in Caribbean literature, and it is rare enough and strong enough to be highlighted."

== Political career ==
Choville is involved in the culture of Martinique as a feminist and an activist. In the 2024 French legislative election, she was elected as the substitute of Béatrice Bellay, who was elected to serve as a member of the National Assembly for Martinique's 3rd constituency. They ran on the ticket of the New Popular Front.
