= Louis-Joseph Manscour =

Martinican politician (born 1945)

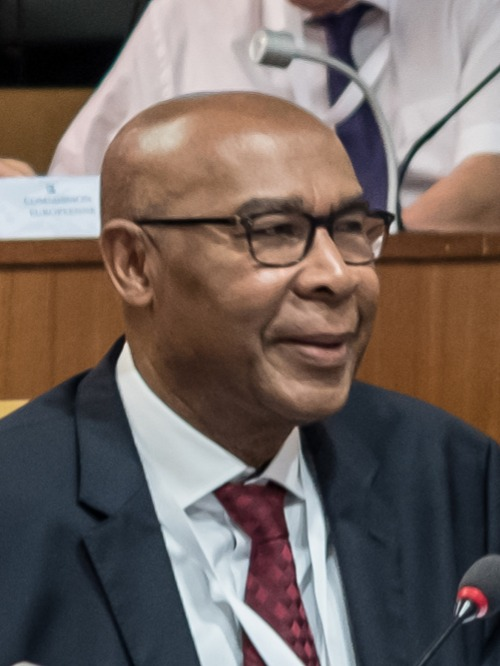
- Manscour at 22nd Conference of the Presidents of the Outermost Regions in 2017

Deputy for Martinique's 1st constituency in the National Assembly of France
- In office 2002–2012
- Preceded by: Anicet Turinay
- Succeeded by: Alfred Marie-Jeanne
- Parliamentary group: PS

Member of European Parliament
- In office 1 July 2014 – 1 July 2019

Personal details
- Born: 20 March 1945 (age 81) La Trinité, Martinique

Louis-Joseph Manscour (French pronunciation: [lwi ʒozɛf mɑ̃skuʁ]; born 20 March 1945 in La Trinité, Martinique) is a Martinican politician. He represented the island of Martinique's 1st constituency in the National Assembly of France from 2002 to 2012 as a member of the Socialiste, radical, citoyen et divers gauche parliamentary group.

He was a member of the European Parliament from 2014 to 2019.
