= Jacques-Alain Bénisti =

French politician

Mayor of Villiers-sur-Marne
- Incumbent
- Assumed office 25 June 1995

Member of the National Assembly for Val-de-Marne
- In office 2002–2017
- Preceded by: Jean-Jacques Jégou
- Succeeded by: Maud Petit

Personal details
- Born: 10 April 1952 (age 74) Paris, France
- Party: The Republicans

Jacques-Alain Bénisti (born 10 April 1952) is a member of the National Assembly of France. He represents the Val-de-Marne department, and is a member of the Union for a Popular Movement.

In 2011, Bénisti created controversy when he publicly equated the legalization of same-sex marriage and bestiality to the legalization of rape.
