= Claude Lise =

French politician (born 1941)

Claude Lise (born 31 January 1941 in Fort-de-France) is a French politician from Martinique. He is a Doctor, and was first elected to public office on 24 September 1995. He is the President of the Assembly of Martinique, which replaced both the Regional and General Councils of Martinique at the end of 2015.

Lise served as the President of the General Council of Martinique from 1992 to 2011. He represented Martinique in the French National Assembly from 1988 to 1993 and in the French Senate from 1995 to 2011.

== Political positions ==
- President of the Assembly of Martinique
- Senatorial groups of friendship:
    - France-Caribbean
    - France-Quebec
    - France-Syria
- Former Deputy
  - Former Assistant of the mayor of Fort-de-France
  - Former Member of Parliament on mission near the Secretary with the Overseas
- Member of the Commission of finances, the budgetary control and the economic accounts of the Nation
- Connected with the Socialist Group
