= President of the General Council of Martinique =

The President of the General Council of Martinique was the elected head of the General Council, the assembly that governed the assembly governing the overseas department of France. The President of the General Council held executive powers from March 2, 1982 to 2015.

== List of presidents of the General Council ==
Name	Entered office	Left office	Party	Notes
Émile Maurice	1970	April 1992		
Claude Lise	April 1992	31 March, 2011		
Josette Manin	31 March, 2011	31 December, 2015		First woman to hold the presidency of the General Council

Josette Manin was the last president of the general council as the French government, in December 2015, merged the regional and general councils for the island into one assembly with the formation of the territorial collective of Martinique.
