= Anicet Turinay =

French politician

Deputy for Martinique's 1st constituency in the National Assembly of France
- In office 2 April 1993 – 18 June 2002
- Preceded by: Guy Lordinot
- Succeeded by: Louis-Joseph Manscour
- Parliamentary group: RPR

Personal details
- Born: 18 April 1945 (age 80) Gros-Morne, Martinique

Anicet Turinay (born 18 April 1945) is a conservative politician from Martinique who served in the French National Assembly from 1993 to 2002.
