= Martinique's 1st constituency =

Constituency of the French Fifth Republic

1st constituency of Martinique
- inline Constituency of the National Assembly of France

- Map of Martinique constituencies
- Deputy: Jiovanny William; DVG
- Department: Martinique
- Cantons: Le François-1, Le François-2, Gros-Morne, Le Lamentin-1, Le Lamentin-2, Le Lamentin-3, Le Robert-1, LeRobert-2, La Trinité
- Registered voters: 80,342

The 1st constituency of Martinique is a French legislative constituency in the Martinique département.

== Deputies ==
| Election | Member | Party |
|---|---|---|
| 1988 | Guy Lordinot | PS |
| 1993 | Anicet Turinay | RPR |
| 1997 | Anicet Turinay | RPR |
| 2002 | Louis-Joseph Manscour | PS |
| 2007 | Louis-Joseph Manscour | PS |
| 2012 | Alfred Marie-Jeanne | MIM |
| 2017 | Josette Manin | BPM |
| 2022 | Jiovanny William | DVG |
| 2024 | Jiovanny William | DVG |

== Election results ==
=== 2024 ===
| Candidate | Party | Alliance | First round | | Second round | |
| Candidate | Party | Alliance | Votes | % | Votes | % |
|---|---|---|---|---|---|---|
| Jiovanny William* | DVG | NFP | 13,095 | 56.56 | 18,552 | 81.97 |
| Philippe Edmond-Mariette | MIM | | 3,106 | 13.42 | 4,081 | 18.03 |
| Alain-Claude Lagier | DVG | | 2,690 | 11.62 | | |
| Cédric Crampon | RN | | 2,312 | 9.99 | | |
| Gabriel Jean-Marie | LO | | 665 | 2.87 | | |
| Yann Mievilly | ECO | | 599 | 2.59 | | |
| Sylvain Hoche | DVD | | 584 | 2.52 | | |
| Fabrice Fiari | DIV | | 100 | 0.43 | | |
| Valid votes | | | 23,151 | 100.00 | 22,633 | 100.00 |
| Blank votes | | | 768 | 3.13 | 1,043 | 4.27 |
| Null votes | | | 615 | 2.51 | 728 | 2.98 |
| Turnout | | | 24,534 | 30.54 | 24,404 | 30.38 |
| Abstentions | | | 55,794 | 69.46 | 55,938 | 69.62 |
| Registered voters | | | 80,328 | | 80,342 | |
| Result | | | DVG HOLD | | | |

* Jiovanny William also received the support of Péyi-A

=== 2022 ===
Legislative Election 2022: Martinique's 1st constituency
| Party | Candidate | Votes | % | ±% |
|---|---|---|---|---|
| MIM | Philippe Edmond-Mariette | 2,664 | 17.88 | +0.21 |
| DVG | Jiovanny William | 2,168 | 14.55 | N/A |
| BPM | Fred Samot | 1,783 | 11.96 | −12.85 |
| LFI | Marie-Noelle Delannay | 1,619 | 10.86 | +6.79 |
| DVG | Ludovic Romain | 1,312 | 8.80 | N/A |
| DVG | Alain-Claude Lagier | 1,179 | 7.91 | N/A |
| PS | Béatrice Bellay | 1,163 | 7.80 | +1.39 |
| DVG | Philippe Jean-Marie-Alphonsine | 624 | 4.19 | N/A |
| DVD (UDC) | Jonathan Tabar | 595 | 3.99 | −7.11 |
| RN | Charles Belimont | 564 | 3.78 | +2.50 |
| Others | N/A | 1,231 | 8.25 | − |
| Turnout | | 14,902 | 20.00 | −3.45 |
2nd round result
| DVG | Jiovanny William | 11,336 | 62.94 | N/A |
| MIM | Philippe Edmond-Mariette | 6,675 | 37.06 | −0.04 |
| Turnout | | 18,011 | 24.22 | −5.92 |
| DVG gain from BPM | | | | |

=== 2017 ===
| Candidate | Label | First round | | Second round | |
| Candidate | Label | Votes | % | Votes | % |
|---|---|---|---|---|---|
| Josette Manin | BPM | 4,266 | 24.81 | 11,986 | 54.89 |
| Philippe Edmond-Mariette | MIM | 3,038 | 17.67 | 9,851 | 45.11 |
| Chantal Maignan | LREM | 2,665 | 15.50 | | |
| Karine Mousseau | LR | 1,909 | 11.10 | | |
| Fabrice Dunon | MIM | 1,479 | 8.60 | | |
| Raphaël Vaugirard | PS | 1,102 | 6.41 | | |
| Christian Verneuil | DVG | 755 | 4.39 | | |
| Géraldine de Thore | LFI | 700 | 4.07 | | |
| Marie-Hellen Marthe | CO | 341 | 1.98 | | |
| Gérard Thalmensi | REG | 244 | 1.42 | | |
| Johan Gaudoux | DIV | 235 | 1.37 | | |
| Nathalie Betegnies | FN | 220 | 1.28 | | |
| Frantz Lebon | DVG | 146 | 0.85 | | |
| Marie de Virginy | UPR | 81 | 0.47 | | |
| Vanessa Hubert | UDI | 14 | 0.08 | | |
| Votes | | 17,195 | 100.00 | 21,837 | 100.00 |
| Valid votes | | 17,195 | 92.33 | 21,837 | 91.22 |
| Blank votes | | 797 | 4.28 | 1,059 | 4.42 |
| Null votes | | 631 | 3.39 | 1,044 | 4.36 |
| Turnout | | 18,623 | 23.45 | 23,940 | 30.14 |
| Abstentions | | 60,809 | 76.55 | 55,485 | 69.86 |
| Registered voters | | 79,432 | | 79,425 | |
Source: Ministry of the Interior

=== 2012 ===
Legislative Election 2012: Martinique 1st - 2nd round
| Party | Candidate | Votes | % | ±% |
|---|---|---|---|---|
| MIM | Alfred Marie-Jeanne | 15,238 | 52.43 | |
| PS | Louis-Joseph Manscour | 13,826 | 47.57 | |
| Turnout | | 31,051 | 40.65 | |
| MIM gain from PS | | Swing | | |

=== 2007 ===
Legislative Election 2007: Martinique 1st - 2nd round
| Party | Candidate | Votes | % | ±% |
|---|---|---|---|---|
| PS | Louis-Joseph Manscour | 14,151 | 55.02 | |
| UMP | Yan Monplaisir | 11,569 | 44.98 | |
| Turnout | | 27,433 | 45.16 | |
| PS hold | | Swing | | |

== Sources and references ==
- French Interior Ministry results website: "Résultats électoraux officiels en France" (in French).
