= Maud Petit =

French politician

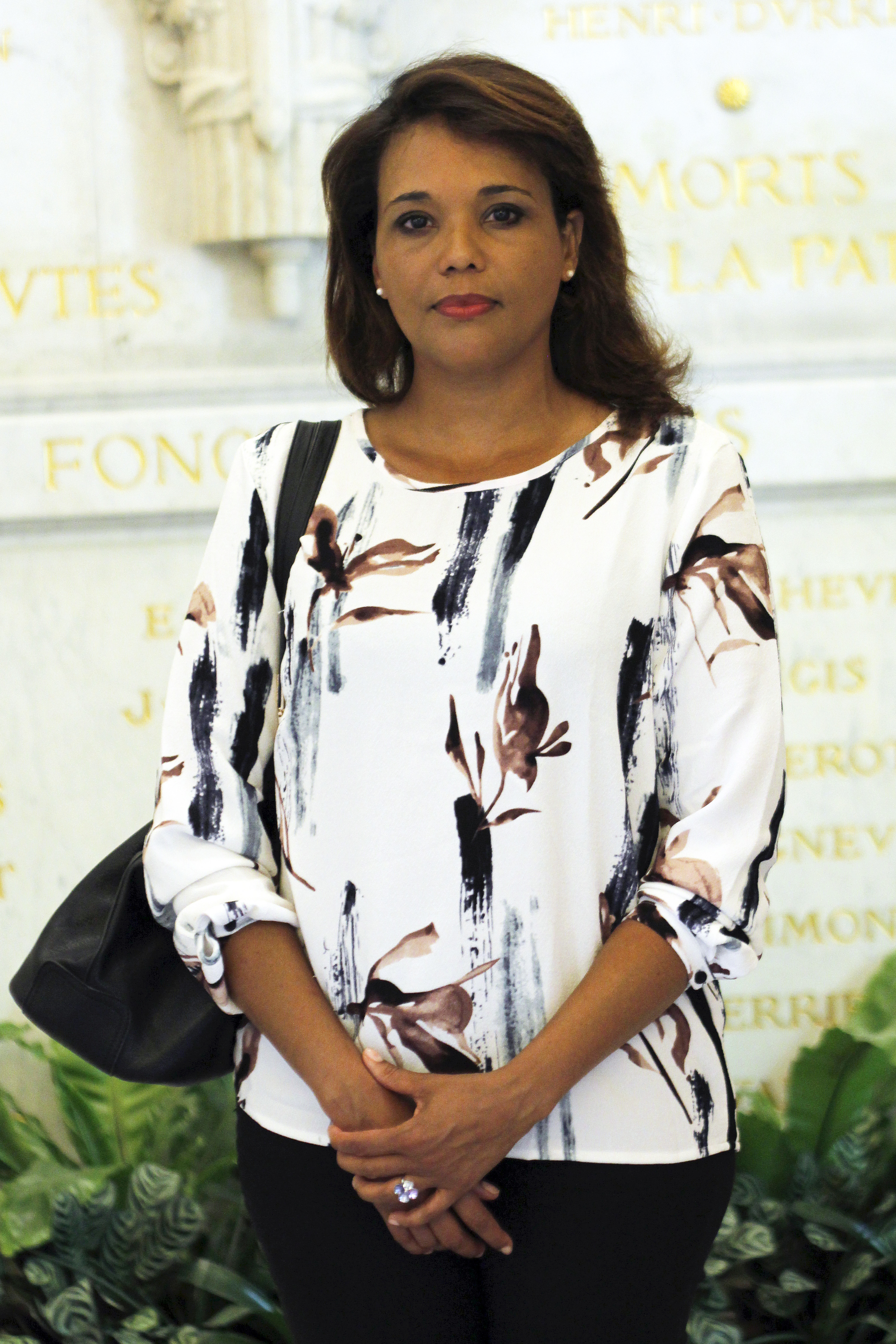

Member of the National Assembly for Val-de-Marne's 4th constituency
- In office 21 June 2017 – 9 June 2024
- Preceded by: Jacques-Alain Bénisti

Member of the Municipal council of Villiers-sur-Marne
- Incumbent
- Assumed office April 2014

Personal details
- Born: 15 November 1971 (age 54) Paris, France
- Party: MoDem
- Education: University of Caen Normandy

Maud Petit is a French politician who has been serving as a member of the French National Assembly from 2017 to 2024, representing Val-de-Marne.

== Early life ==
Born in Paris, Petit grew up in Martinique. She attended school in Fort-de-France, at the Convent Saint-Joseph de Cluny, at the College of Pointe des Nègres and Schœlcher High School, before leaving for Normandy pursue her graduate studies in Law and Modern Literature, at the University of Caen Normandy.

The daughter of an urban architect and a doctor in geography, elder sister of 5 siblings, she is also granddaughter of Camille Petit, doctor became deputy of Martinique from 1967 to 1986. She is the mother of two children. She does her professional career in the field of Human Resources.

== Political career ==
=== Career in local politics ===
Petit was elected municipal councilor of Villiers-sur-Marne in the 2014 municipal elections on the UMP-UDI-MoDem union list led by Jacques-Alain Bénisti. She then in charge of the delegation of early childhood.

=== Member of the National Assembly ===
Petit was elected to the French National Assembly on 18 June 2017, representing the 4th constituency of Val-de-Marne.

In the National Assembly, Petit sits on the Cultural and Education Affairs Committee. She is a member of the Working Group on the Olympic and Paralympic Games in Paris in 2024 and member of the Mission of information on the school in the digital society. She is a Secretary of the Delegation to overseas.

She was re-elected in the 2022 elections.

In addition to her committee assignments, Petit has been a member of the French delegation to the Parliamentary Assembly of the Council of Europe from 2022 to 2024. In this capacity, she has been serving on the Committee on Equality and Non-Discrimination.

== See also ==
- 2017 French legislative election
- 2022 French legislative election
- Val-de-Marne's 4th constituency
