= Martinique's 3rd constituency =

Constituency of the French Fifth Republic

3rd constituency of Martinique
- inline Constituency of the National Assembly of France

- Map of Martinique constituencies
- Deputy: Béatrice Bellay; FSM
- Department: Martinique

The 3rd constituency of Martinique is a French legislative constituency in the Martinique département. It consists of the commune of Fort-de-France, the capital of Martinique. In every election of the Fifth Republic, with the exceptions of the 2002 and 2024, it has returned a member of the Martinican Progressive Party.

== Deputies ==
Election	Member	Party	Notes
1958	Aimé Césaire	PPM	
1962	Aimé Césaire	PPM	
1967	Aimé Césaire	PPM	
1968	Aimé Césaire	PPM	
1973	Aimé Césaire	PPM	
1978	Aimé Césaire	PPM	
1981	Aimé Césaire	PPM	
1986	Proportional representation - no election by constituency		
1988	Aimé Césaire	PPM	
1993	Camille Darsières	PPM	
1997	Camille Darsières	PPM	
2002	Pierre-Jean Samot	BPM	election invalidated by the Constitutional Council, February 2003
2003	Philippe Edmond-Mariette	BPM	Substitute for Samot
2007	Serge Letchimy	PPM	
2012	Serge Letchimy	PPM	
2017	Serge Letchimy	PPM	
2022	Johnny Hajjar	PPM	
2024	Béatrice Bellay	FSM	

== Election results ==
=== 2024 ===
Candidate	Party	Alliance	First round		Second round	
Candidate	Party	Alliance	Votes	%	Votes	%
Johnny Hajjar	PPM	NFP	6,626	37.28	8,541	45.47
Béatrice Bellay	FSM		4,489	25.26	10,243	54.53
Francis Carole	REG		2,617	14.72		
Max Ferraty	RN		1,684	9.47		
Nathalie Jos	Péyi-A		1,010	5.68		
Frédérique Dispagne	DVG		624	3.51		
Mélanie Sulio	LO		363	2.04		
Emmanuel Granier	DVD		361	2.03		
Valid votes			17,774	100.00	18,784	100.00
Blank votes			585	3.12	783	3.90
Null votes			417	2.22	488	2.43
Turnout			18,776	31.16	20,055	33.28
Abstentions			41,482	68.84	40,205	66.72
Registered voters			60,258		60,260	
Result			FSM GAIN FROM PPM			

=== 2022 ===
Legislative Election 2022: Martinique's 3rd constituency
Party	Candidate	Votes	%	±%
PPM	Johnny Hajjar	4,471	37.03	−23.14
REG	Francis Carole	2,288	18.95	+2.37
LFI (NUPÉS)	Thierry Renard	1,679	13.90	+11.39
Péyi-A	Nathalie Jos	684	5.66	+3.04
DVG	Jean-Michel Jean Baptiste	684	5.66	N/A
DVG	Daniel Robin	597	4.94	N/A
LREM (Ensemble)	Audrey Arielle Giraud	420	3.48	−1.86
RN	Cédric Crampon	413	3.42	+2.36
LO	Gabriel Jean-Marie	243	2.01	N/A
Others	N/A	596	4.93	−
Turnout		12,075	21.21	−8.12
2nd round result
PPM	Johnny Hajjar	7,813	58.74	−15.20
REG	Francis Carole	5,489	41.26	+15.20
Turnout		13,302	23.84	−9.35
PPM hold				

=== 2017 ===
Candidate	Label	First round		Second round	
Candidate	Label	Votes	%	Votes	%
Serge Letchimy	PPM	11,092	60.17	15,114	73.94
Françis Carole	REG	3,057	16.58	5,326	26.06
Max Orville	MoDem	985	5.34		
Miguel Laventure	DVD	708	3.84		
Nathalie Jos	DVG	483	2.62		
Thierry Renard	FI	463	2.51		
Marie-France Toul	DVG	344	1.87		
Kaylan Fagour	DIV	308	1.67		
Ghislaine Joachim-Arnaud	EXG	302	1.64		
Matthieu Gama	DIV	222	1.20		
Marie-Jeanne Jeanville	FN	173	0.94		
Alain Limery	REG	169	0.92		
Cyril de Virginy	DIV	68	0.37		
Marie-Gabrielle Marguerite	UDI	60	0.33		
Votes		18,434	100.00	20,440	100.00
Valid votes		18,434	96.10	20,440	94.17
Blank votes		446	2.33	729	3.36
Null votes		302	1.57	537	2.47
Turnout		19,182	29.33	21,706	33.19
Abstentions		46,214	70.67	43,693	66.81
Registered voters		65,396		65,399	
Source: Ministry of the Interior

=== 2012 ===
In the National Assembly election system, candidates are elected in the first round by obtaining an absolute majority of the vote in their constituency and the votes of at least one quarter of all registered voters in the constituency. If many voters abstain, an absolute majority of the vote may thus not be enough, although this rarely happens. In the 2012 election, this constituency provided a surprising example of this. Incumbent MP Serge Letchimy of the Martinican Progressive Party received 63.29% of the vote, but narrowly failed to be immediately elected due to a very low turnout (30.67%).

2012 legislative election in Martinique's 3rd constituency
Candidate	Party	First round		Second round	
Candidate	Party	Votes	%	Votes	%
Serge Letchimy	PPM	11,713	63.29%	15,188	70.24%
Francis Carole	DVG	3,580	19.34%	6,434	29.76%
Miguel Laventure	DVD	1,373	7.42%		
Georges Virassamy	UMP	824	4.45%		
Ghislaine Joachim-Arnaud	Combat ouvrier	653	3.53%		
Lina Georget	FN	211	1.14%		
Thierry Lésel	MoDem	145	0.78%		
Richard Jean-Marie	DVG	8	0.04%		
Marie-Jeanne Jeanville	DVG	0	0.00%		
Valid votes		18,507	94.57%	21,622	93.24%
Spoilt and null votes		1,062	5.43%	1,568	6.76%
Votes cast / turnout		19,569	29.73%	23,190	35.07%
Abstentions		46,245	70.27%	42,927	64.93%
Registered voters		65,814	100.00%	66,117	100.00%
