= Victor Sablé =

Victor Sablé (30 November 1911 in Fort-de-France, Martinique – 24 August 1997 in Nice, France) was a politician from Martinique who served in the French Senate from 1946-1948 and also the French National Assembly. His father was a lawyer's clerk, and he studied in Paris after graduating from the Lycée de Fort-de-France. He authored Les Antilles sans complexes: une expérience de décolonisation (1972), in which he recounted his political and governmental experiences in Paris.
