= Pierre-Jean Samot =

French politician (1934–2024)

Deputy for Martinique's 3rd constituency in the National Assembly of France
- In office 19 June 2002 – 27 February 2003
- Preceded by: Camille Darsières
- Succeeded by: Philippe Edmond-Mariette
- Parliamentary group: Non Inscrit

Mayor of Le Lamentin
- In office 1989–2018

Personal details
- Born: 21 August 1934 Fort-de-France, Martinique
- Died: 14 June 2024 (aged 89)
- Party: Build the Martinique Country

Pierre-Jean Samot (21 August 1934 – 14 June 2024) was a politician from Martinique. He was Mayor of Le Lamentin from 1989 to 2018. In the 2002 French legislative election he was elected to the National Assembly from Martinique's 3rd constituency. However, his election was invalidated by the Constitutional Council on 27 February 2003 and he was replaced by his substitute Philippe Edmond-Mariette. Samot died on 14 June 2024, at the age of 89.

== Sources ==
- page on the French National Assembly website
