= Serge Letchimy =

French politician

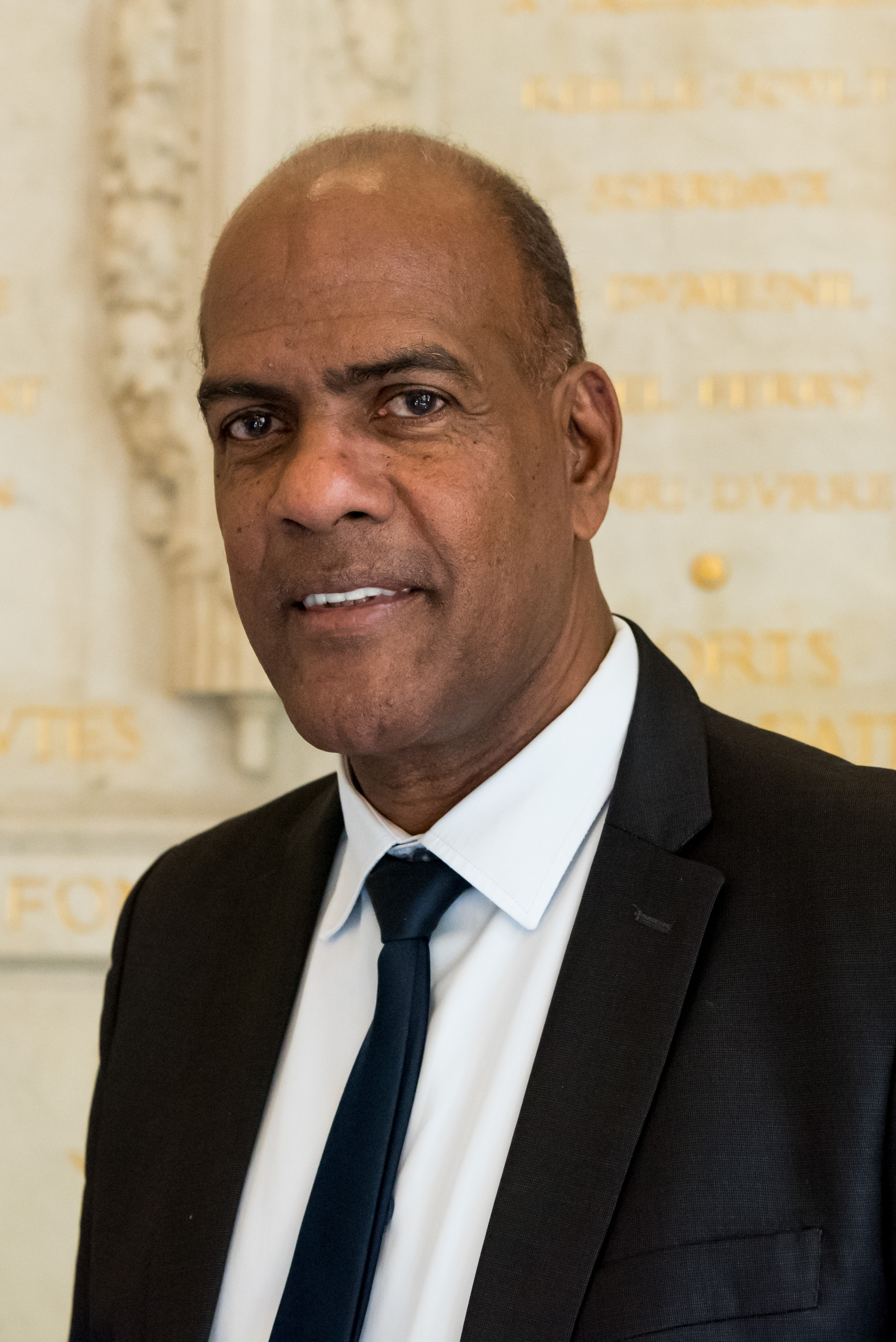

Deputy for Martinique's 3rd constituency in the National Assembly of France
- In office 20 June 2007 – 2 July 2021
- Preceded by: Philippe Edmond-Mariette
- Succeeded by: Johnny Hajjar
- Parliamentary group: Socialist (Associated)

Personal details
- Born: 13 January 1953 (age 73) Gros-Morne, Martinique
- Party: Martinican Progressive
- Education: Sorbonne University

Serge Letchimy (French pronunciation: [sɛʁʒ lɛtʃimi]; born 13 January 1953) is a French politician who served in the National Assembly for Martinique's 3rd constituency from 2007 to 2021. He has been active in the politics of Martinique, where he has been mayor of Fort-de-France and president of the Regional Council of Martinique. He is the president of the Martinican Progressive Party and sat with the Socialists and affiliated group in the assembly.

== Early life and education ==
Serge Letchimy was born in Gros-Morne, Martinique, on 13 January 1953. He graduated from Sorbonne University with a bachelor's degree in geography in 1984, and a doctorate in urban planning and strategy.

== Career ==
Letchimy worked under Mayor Aimé Césaire as an urban planner and was personally close to Césaire. Letchimy succeeded Césaire as mayor of Fort-de-France in 2001. In 2005, Letchimy was elected president of the Martinican Progressive Party. In 2010, he became president of the Regional Council of Martinique.

Carnival festivals in Martinique were cancelled by Letchimy in 2009, due to the 2009 French Caribbean general strikes.

In the 2007 election Letchimy won a seat in the National Assembly from Martinique's 3rd constituency. He was reelected in 2012 and 2017 before resigning on 1 July 2021. He sat with the Socialists and affiliated group. During his tenure in the assembly he was a member of the Economic Affairs, Foreign Affairs, Social Affairs, and Cultural Affairs committees. He was president of the France-Bolivia parliamentary friendship group from 26 September 2012 to 20 June 2017.

== Works cited ==
=== News ===
- "Carnaval annulé en Martinique". Le Figaro. 20 February 2009. Archived from the original on 8 July 2025.

=== Web ===
- "First Official Visit of Serge Letchimy, Martinique's Highest Ranking Representative, to the United States". PR Newswire. 30 August 2013. Archived from the original on 8 July 2025.
- "Fonctions". National Assembly. Archived from the original on 12 October 2024.
- "M. Serge Letchimy". National Assembly. Archived from the original on 8 July 2025.
