= Guy Lordinot =

French politician

Deputy for Martinique's 1st constituency in the National Assembly of France
- In office 13 June 1988 – 1 April 1993
- Preceded by: proportional representation in eighth legislature
- Succeeded by: Anicet Turinay
- Parliamentary group: PS

Personal details
- Born: 30 January 1944 (age 82) Sainte-Marie, Martinique

Guy Lordinot (born 30 January 1944 in Sainte-Marie, Martinique) is a politician from Martinique who served in the French National Assembly from 1988–1993.
