= Johnny Hajjar =

French politician (born 1973)

Member of the National Assembly for Martinique's 3rd constituency
- In office 22 June 2022 – 9 June 2024
- Preceded by: Serge Letchimy
- Succeeded by: Béatrice Bellay

Personal details
- Born: 17 January 1973 (age 53) Schœlcher, Martinique
- Party: Martinican Progressive Party

Johnny Hajjar (born 17 January 1973) is a French politician. He became the Member of Parliament for Martinique's 3rd constituency in the 2022 French legislative election. He was defeated in the 2024 election by Béatrice Bellay. Hajjar is a member of the Martinican Progressive Party.

== See also ==
- List of deputies of the 16th National Assembly of France
