= Regional Council of Martinique =

Regional council governing Martinique

Regional Council of Martinique Conseil régional de la Martinique
- Regional Council

History
- Disbanded: December 2015
- Succeeded by: Assembly of Martinique

Leadership
- (former) President: Serge Letchimy, PPM since 2010

Structure
- Seats: 41 Regional Councillors
- Political groups: Ensemble pour une Martinique nouvelle (26); Patriotes et sympathisants (12); Rassembler la Martinique (3)

Elections
- Voting system: Proportional representation, two round voting
- Last election: 2010

Website
- www.region-martinique.mq

The Regional Council of Martinique served as the regional council governing Martinique. In 2015, the Assembly of Martinique was established to replace both the Regional and General Councils of Martinique.

Its headquarters were located in the Defferre Cluny hotel district in Fort-de-France. Serge Letchimy of the Martinican Progressive Party chaired the Regional Council from March 21, 2010, until it was replaced by the Assembly of Martinique.

== Executive and Standing Committee ==
- 1st Vice President: Catherine Conconne,
- 2nd Vice President: Jean-Claude Duverger (PPM),
- 3rd Vice President: Patricia Telle,
- 4th Vice President: Didier Laguerre,
- 5th Vice President: Yvette Galot,
- 6th Vice President: Luc Louison Clémenté,
- 7th Vice President: Jenny Dulys,
- 8th Vice President: Justin Pamphile,
- 9th Vice President: Jocelyne Pinville,
- 10th Vice President: Daniel Robin,
- 11th Vice President: Daniel Marie-Sainte,
- 12th Vice President: Miguel Laventure.

== Political parties ==
Majority: "Together for a new Martinique" (alliance of PPM, the Socialist Federation of Martinique, Franciscan Popular Movement, Dare Dare, Miscellaneous Left Movement "Living in Schoelcher" and civil society), led by Serge Letchimy has 26 seats.

The 26 elected officials are: Serge Letchimy (PPM), Catherine Conconne (PPM), Jean-Claude Duverger (PPM), Patricia Telle (FSM), Didier Laguerre (PPM), Yvette Galot (DVG), Luc-Louison Clemente (Living Movement Schoelcher), Jenny Dulys (Dare Dare), Justin Pamphile (DVG), Jocelyne Pinville (DVG), Daniel Robin (PPM), Karine Roy-Camille (civil society), Daniel Chomet (PPM), Christiane Mage (PPM), Simon Morin (PPM), Marie-France Thodiard (MPF), Jean Crusol (PPM), Maria Theresa Casimirius (PPM), Fred Lordinot (PPM), Marlene Lanoix (FSM), Camille Chauvet (PPM), Karine Galy (DVG) Jose Maurice (DVG), Elizabeth Landi (PPM), Thierry Fondelot (PPM), Manuéla Kéclard-Mondésir (PPM).

Opposition: "Martinique Patriots and Sympathizers" (alliance of MIM, Palima, CNCP, and sympathizers), led by Alfred Marie-Jeanne has 12 seats.

== Committees ==
- Committee for Sustainable Development, Transport and Energy: Chairperson-Daniel Chomet
- Committee for Economic Affairs: Chairperson-Jean Crusol
- Committee for Social Economy: Chairperson-Justin Pamphile
- Committee for Culture and Heritage: Chairperson-Yvette Galot
- Committee for Construction and Equipment: Chairperson-Luc-Louison Clemente
- Committee for Finance and The Budget: Chairperson-Fred Lordinot
- Committee for Agriculture and Livestock: Chairperson-Jose Maurice
- Committee for Cooperation and European Affairs: Chairperson-Karine Galy
- Committee for Fisheries, Aquaculture, Marine resources and Maritime affairs: Chairperson-Maurice Antiste
- Committee for Education and Training: Chairperson-Daniel Robin
- Committee for Higher Education, Innovation and Research: Chairperson-Elizabeth Landi
- Committee for Health: Chairperson-Marlene Lanoix
- Committee for Housing and Habitation: Chairperson-Simon Morin
- Committee for Sports: Chairperson-Thierry Fondelot
- Committee for Legal Affairs, Opinion and Statutory texts and the legislature: Chairperson-Chantal Maignan
- Committee for the Currency: Chairperson-Didier Laguerre
- Committee for Evaluation of the SAR: Chairperson-Camille Chauvet
- Committee for Public Private Partnership: Chairperson-Didier Laguerre
- Special Committee for Project management: Chairperson-Manuella Kéclard-Mondesir
- Committee for Public Service: Chairperson-Daniel Robin
- Committee for the Stimulus plan and Major Infrastructural projects: Chairperson-Catherine Conconne
- Committee for Community Preparedness: Chairperson-Didier Laguerre
- Committee for Early Planning: Chairperson-Justin Pamphile
- Committee for Tourism: Chairperson-Karine Roy-Camille
- Committee for Evaluation: Chairperson-Daniel Robin
- Committee for Dock Fees and taxes: Chairperson-Andre Lesueur
- Committee for Major risks and natural disasters: Chairperson-Jocelyne Pinville

== See also ==
- List of presidents of the Regional Council of Martinique
