= Jiovanny William =

French politician (born 1985)

Member of the National Assembly for Martinique's 1st constituency
- Incumbent
- Assumed office 22 June 2022
- Preceded by: Josette Manin

Personal details
- Born: 3 June 1985 (age 40) Fort-de-France, Martinique
- Party: Miscellaneous left
- Other political affiliations: NUPES (2022)

Jiovanny William (born 3 June 1985) is a French politician. He became the Member of Parliament for Martinique's 1st constituency in the 2022 French legislative election.

== See also ==
- List of deputies of the 16th National Assembly of France
