= Philippe Edmond-Mariette =

French politician

Deputy for Martinique's 3rd constituency in the National Assembly of France
- In office February 2003 – 2007
- Preceded by: Pierre-Jean Samot
- Succeeded by: Serge Letchimy

Personal details
- Born: 15 October 1955 (age 70) Fort-de-France, Martinique
- Party: Build the Martinique Country

Philippe Edmond-Mariette (born 15 October 1955 in Fort-de-France, Martinique) is a politician from Martinique. In the 2002 French legislative election he was the substitute candidate for Pierre-Jean Samot for Martinique's 3rd constituency. Samot's election was invalidated by the Constitutional Council on 27 February 2003 and he was replaced by Edmond-Mariette, who held the constituency until 2007.

== Honors and awards ==
Knight of the Order of Legion of Honour
