= Socialist Federation of Martinique =

The Socialist Federation of Martinique (French: Fédération socialiste de la Martinique, FSM) is a political party in Martinique, France. The FSM is the Martinique federation of the Socialist Party.

The party was founded in 1901 by Joseph Lagrosillière. In the 2024 French legislative election, Béatrice Bellay was elected the party's only Member of Parliament in Martinique's 3rd constituency.
