= Jean-Jacques Jégou =

French politician (born 1945)

Jean-Jacques Jégou (born 24 March 1945 in Versailles) is a former member of the Senate of France, who represented the Val-de-Marne department from 2004 to 2011. He is a member of the Centrist Union.
