= Martinican Progressive Party =

Political party in Martinique

Martinique Progressive Party Parti progressiste martiniquais
- President: Serge Letchimy
- Secretary-General: Johnny Hajjar
- Founder: Aimé Césaire
- Founded: 22 March 1958
- Split from: French Communist Party
- Headquarters: PPM, Ancien réservoir de Trénelle, 97200 Fort-de-France
- Ideology: Progressivism; Democratic socialism Autonomism
- Political position: Left-wing
- National affiliation: Socialists and affiliated group New Popular Front
- Colors: Green, red and black
- National Assembly: 0 / 577
- Assembly of Martinique: 26 / 51

Website
- ppm-martinique.org

The Martinican Progressive Party (French: Parti progressiste martiniquais, PPM) is a democratic socialist political party in Martinique. It was founded on March 22, 1958 by poet Aimé Césaire after breaking off from the French Communist Party. The party favours the autonomy of Martinique within France, unlike the nationalist Martinican Independence Movement (MIM). The party has one seat in the French National Assembly, currently held by Serge Letchimy, deputy from Fort-de-France (Martinique's 3rd constituency).
