= MPs first elected in the 2022 French legislative election =

This article lists all the Members of Parliament (députés) who were newly elected in their own right to the 16th legislature of the French National Assembly in the 2022 legislative election.

235 legislators were new members of the National Assembly.

== List ==
| Deputy | Constituency | Coalition | Party |
|---|---|---|---|
| Nadège Abomangoli | Seine-Saint-Denis's 10th constituency | NUPES | LFI |
| Sabrina Agresti-Roubache | Bouches-du-Rhône's 1st constituency | Ensemble | LREM |
| Henri Alfandari | Indre-et-Loire's 3rd constituency | Ensemble | H |
| Gabriel Amard | Rhône's 6th constituency | NUPES | LFI |
| Ségolène Amiot | Loire-Atlantique's 3rd constituency | NUPES | LFI |
| Farida Amrani | Essonne's 1st constituency | NUPES | LFI |
| Antoine Armand | Haute-Savoie's 2nd constituency | Ensemble | LREM |
| Bénédicte Auzanot | Vaucluse's 2nd constituency | — | RN |
| Anne-Laure Babault | Charente-Maritime's 2nd constituency | Ensemble | LREM |
| Philippe Ballard | Oise's 2nd constituency | — | RN |
| Christian Baptiste | Guadeloupe's 2nd constituency | NUPES | PPDG |
| Christophe Barthès | Aude's 1st constituency | — | RN |
| Quentin Bataillon | Loire's 1st constituency | Ensemble | LREM |
| Romain Baubry | Bouches-du-Rhône's 15th constituency | — | RN |
| José Beaurain | Aisne's 4th constituency | — | RN |
| Béatrice Bellamy | Vendée's 2nd constituency | Ensemble | Horizons |
| Christophe Bentz | Haute-Marne's 1st constituency | — | RN |
| Fanta Berete | Paris's 12th constituency | Ensemble | LREM |
| Pierrick Berteloot | Nord's 15th constituency | — | RN |
| Véronique Besse | Vendée's 4th constituency | — | DVD |
| Christophe Bex | Haute-Garonne's 7th constituency | NUPES | LFI |
| Sophie Blanc | Pyrénées-Orientales's 1st constituency | — | RN |
| Frédéric Boccaletti | Var's 7th constituency | — | RN |
| Manuel Bompard | Bouches du Rhône's 4th constituency | NUPES | LFI |
| Pascale Bordes | Gard's 3rd constituency | — | RN |
| Élisabeth Borne | Calvados's 6th constituency | Ensemble | LREM |
| Mickaël Bouloux | Ille-et-Vilaine's 8th constituency | NUPES | PS |
| Idir Boumertit | Rhône's 14th constituency | NUPES | LFI |
| Jean-Luc Bourgeaux | Ille-et-Vilaine's 7th constituency | UDC | LR |
| Hubert Brigand | Côte-d'Or's 4th constituency | UDC | LR |
| Soumya Bourouaha | Seine-Saint-Denis's 4th constituency | NUPES | PCF |
| Jorys Bovet | Allier's 2nd constituency | — | RN |
| Louis Boyard | Val-de-Marne's 3rd constituency | NUPES | LFI |
| Maud Bregeon | Hauts-de-Seine's 13th constituency | Ensemble | LREM |
| Anthony Brosse | Loiret's 5th constituency | Ensemble | LREM |
| Françoise Buffet | Bas-Rhin's 4th constituency | Ensemble | LREM |
| Jérôme Buisson | Ain's 4th constituency | — | RN |
| Frédéric Cabrolier | Tarn's 1st constituency | — | RN |
| Élie Califer | Guadeloupe's 4th constituency | NUPES | PS |
| Éléonore Caroit | Second Overseas Constituency | Ensemble | LREM |
| Aymeric Caron | Paris's 18th constituency | NUPES | LFI (REV) |
| Sylvain Carrière | Hérault's 8th constituency | NUPES | LFI |
| Jean-Victor Castor | French Guiana's 1st constituency | NUPES | MDES |
| Victor Catteau | Nord's 5th constituency | — | RN |
| Thomas Cazenave | Gironde's 1st constituency | Ensemble | LREM |
| Steve Chailloux | French Polynesia's 2nd constituency | NUPES | Tavini Huiraatira |
| Emilie Chandler | Val-d'Oise's 1st constituency | Ensemble | Agir |
| Cyrielle Chatelain | Isère's 2nd constituency | NUPES | EELV |
| Florian Chauche | Territoire-de-Belfort's 2nd constituency | NUPES | LFI |
| Yannick Chenevard | Var's 1st constituency | Ensemble | LREM |
| Sophia Chikirou | Paris's 6th constituency | NUPES | LFI |
| Hadrien Clouet | Haute-Garonne's 1st constituency | NUPES | LFI |
| Mickaël Cosson | Côtes-d'Armor's 1st constituency | Ensemble | MoDem |
| Laurent Croizier | Doubs's 1st constituency | Ensemble | MoDem |
| Laurence Cristol | Hérault's 3rd constituency | Ensemble | LREM |
| Christelle d’Intorni | Alpes-Maritimes's 5th constituency | UDC | LR |
| Nathalie Da Conceicao Carvalho | Essonne's 2nd constituency | — | RN |
| Catherine Couturier | Creuse's constituency | NUPES | LFI |
| Romain Daubié | Ain's 2nd constituency | Ensemble | MoDem |
| Grégoire de Fournas | Gironde's 5th constituency | — | RN |
| Stéphane Delautrette | Haute-Vienne's 2nd constituency | NUPES | PS |
| Nicolas Dragon | Aisne's 1st constituency | — | RN |
| Christine Decodts | Nord's 13th constituency | — | RN |
| Arthur Delaporte | Calvados's 2nd constituency | NUPES | PS |
| Julie Delpech | Sarthe's 1st constituency | Ensemble | LREM |
| Jocelyn Dessigny | Aisne's 5th constituency | — | RN |
| Edwige Diaz | Gironde's 11th constituency | — | RN |
| Sandrine Dogor-Such | Pyrénées-Orientales's 3rd constituency | — | RN |
| Francis Dubois | Corrèze's 1st constituency | — | DVD (joined LR after election) |
| Alma Dufour | Seine-Maritime's 4th constituency | NUPES | LFI |
| Iñaki Echaniz | Pyrénées-Atlantiques's 4th constituency | NUPES | PS |
| Christine Engrand | Pas-de-Calais's 6th constituency | — | RN |
| Karen Erodi | Tarn's 2nd constituency | NUPES | LFI |
| Philippe Fait | Pas-de-Calais's 4th constituency | Ensemble | LREM |
| Emmanuel Fernandes | Bas-Rhin's 2nd constituency | NUPES | LFI |
| Sylvie Ferrer | Hautes-Pyrénées's 1st constituency | NUPES | LFI |
| Estelle Folest | Val d'Oise's 6th constituency | Ensemble | MoDem |
| Charles Fournier | Indre-et-Loire's 1st constituency | NUPES | EELV |
| Perceval Gaillard | Réunion's 7th constituency | NUPES | LFI |
| Marie-Charlotte Garin | Rhône's 3rd constituency | NUPES | LFI |
| Raquel Garrido | Seine-Saint-Denis's 5th constituency | NUPES | LFI |
| Félicie Gérard | Nord's 7th constituency | Ensemble | H |
| François Gernigon | Maine-et-Loire's 1st constituency | Ensemble | H |
| Hadrien Ghomi | Seine-et-Marne's 8th constituency | Ensemble | LREM |
| Frank Giletti | Var's 6th constituency | — | RN |
| Christian Girard | Alpes de Haute Provence's 1st constituency | — | RN |
| Justine Gruet | Jura's 3rd constituency | UDC | LR |
| Clémence Guetté | Val-de-Marne's 2nd constituency | NUPES | LFI |
| David Guiraud | Nord's 8th constituency | NUPES | LFI |
| Benjamin Haddad | Paris's 14th constituency | Ensemble | LREM |
| Johnny Hajjar | Martinique's 3rd constituency | NUPES | PPM |
| Mathilde Hignet | Ille-et-Vilaine's 4th constituency | NUPES | LFI |
| Jérémie Iordanoff | Isère's 5th constituency | NUPES | EELV |
| Alexis Izard | Essonne's 3rd constituency | Ensemble | LREM |
| Alexis Jolly | Isère's 6th constituency | — | RN |
| Emeline K/Bidi | Réunion's 4th constituency | NUPES | Le Progrès |
| Rachel Keke | Val-de-Marne's 7th constituency | NUPES | LFI |
| Fatiha Keloua-Hachi | Seine-Saint-Denis's 8th constituency | NUPES | PS |
| Brigitte Klinkert | Haut-Rhin's 1st constituency | Ensemble | LREM |
| Stéphanie Kochert | Bas-Rhin's 8th constituency | Ensemble | Horizons |
| Julie Laernoes | Loire-Atlantique's 4th constituency | NUPES | EELV |
| Maxime Laisney | Seine-et-Marne's 10th constituency | NUPES | LFI |
| Luc Lamirault | Eure-et-Loir's 3rd constituency | Ensemble | Horizons |
| Laure Lavalette | Var's 2nd constituency | — | RN |
| Pascal Lavergne | Gironde's 12th constituency | Ensemble | LREM |
| Tematai Le Gayic | French Polynesia's 1st constituency | NUPES | Tavini Huiraatira |
| Antoine Léaument | Essonne's 10th constituency | NUPES | LFI |
| Karine Lebon | Réunion's 2nd constituency | NUPES | PLR |
| Elise Leboucher | Sarthe's 4th constituency | NUPES | LFI |
| Pascal Lecamp | Vienne's 3rd constituency | Ensemble | MoDem |
| Mathieu Lefèvre | Val-de-Marne's 5th constituency | Ensemble | LREM |
| Jérôme Legavre | Seine-Saint-Denis's 12th constituency | NUPES | POI |
| Sarah Legrain | Paris's 16th constituency | NUPES | LFI |
| Gisèle Lelouis | Bouches-du-Rhône's 3rd constituency | — | RN |
| Didier Lemaire | Haut-Rhin's 3rd constituency | Ensemble | H |
| Stéphane Lenormand | Saint-Pierre-et-Miquelon's 1st constituency | UDC | AD |
| Hervé de Lépinau | Vaucluse's 3rd constituency | — | RN |
| Murielle Lepvraud | Côtes-d'Armor's 4th constituency | NUPES | LFI |
| Katiana Levavasseur | Eure's 2nd constituency | — | RN |
| Arnaud Le Gall | Val d'Oise's 9th constituency | NUPES | LFI |
| Anne Le Hénanff | Morbihan's 1st constituency | Ensemble | H |
| Delphine Lingemann | Puy-de-Dôme's 4th constituency | Ensemble | MoDem |
| Christine Loir | Eure's 1st constituency | — | RN |
| Aurélien Lopez-Liguori | Hérault's 7th constituency | — | RN |
| Philippe Lottiaux | Var's 4th constituency | — | RN |
| Alexandre Loubet | Moselle's 7th constituency | — | RN |
| Jean-François Lovisolo | Vaucluse's 5th constituency | Ensemble | LREM |
| Benjamin Lucas | Yvelines's 8th constituency | NUPES | G.s |
| Frédéric Maillot | Réunion's 6th constituency | NUPES | PLR |
| Emmanuel Mandon | Loire's 3rd constituency | Ensemble | LREM |
| Matthieu Marchio | Nord's 16th constituency | — | RN |
| Bastien Marchive | Deux-Sèvres's 1st constituency | Ensemble | PR |
| Louis Margueritte | Saône-et-Loire's 5th constituency | Ensemble | H |
| Christophe Marion | Loir-et-Cher's 3rd constituency | Ensemble | LREM |
| Éric Martineau | Sarthe's 3rd constituency | Ensemble | MoDem |
| Élisa Martin | Isère's 3rd constituency | NUPES | LFI |
| Alexandra Martin | Alpes-Maritimes's 8th constituency | UDC | LR |
| Pascale Martin | Dordogne's 1st constituency | NUPES | LFI |
| Michèle Martinez | Pyrénées-Orientales's 4th constituency | — | RN |
| Alexandra Masson | Aisne's 4th constituency | — | RN |
| Bryan Masson | Alpes-Maritimes's 6th constituency | — | RN |
| Frédéric Mathieu | Ille-et-Vilaine's 1st constituency | NUPES | LFI |
| Damien Maudet | Haute-Vienne's 1st constituency | NUPES | LFI |
| Kévin Mauvieux | Eure's 3rd constituency | — | RN |
| Marianne Maximi | Puy-de-Dôme's 1st constituency | NUPES | LFI |
| Nicolas Meizonnet | Gard's 2nd constituency | — | RN |
| Joëlle Mélin | Bouches-du-Rhône's 9th constituency | — | RN |
| Yaël Ménache | Somme's 5th constituency | — | RN |
| Thomas Ménagé | Loiret's 4th constituency | — | RN |
| Lysiane Métayer | Morbihan's 5th constituency | Ensemble | LREM |
| Nicolas Metzdorf | New Caledonia's 2nd constituency | Ensemble | GNC |
| Manon Meunier | Haute-Vienne's 3rd constituency | NUPES | LFI |
| Pierre Meurin | Gard's 4th constituency | — | RN |
| Yannick Monnet | Allier's 1st constituency | NUPES | PCF |
| Louise Morel | Bas-Rhin's 6th constituency | Ensemble | MoDem |
| Benoît Mournet | Hautes-Pyrénées's 2nd constituency | Ensemble | LREM |
| Serge Muller | Dordogne's 2nd constituency | — | RN |
| Marcellin Nadeau | Martinique's 2nd constituency | NUPES | Péyi-A |
| Yannick Neuder | Isère's 7th constituency | UDC | LR |
| Julien Odoul | Yonne's 3rd constituency | — | RN |
| Karl Olive | Yvelines's 12th constituency | Ensemble | LREM |
| Hubert Ott | Haut-Rhin's 2nd constituency | Ensemble | MoDem |
| Nicolas Pacquot | Doubs's 3rd constituency | Ensemble | LREM |
| Laurent Panifous | Ariège's 2nd constituency | — | PS |
| Astrid Panosyan | Paris's 4th constituency | Ensemble | LREM |
| Mathilde Paris | Loiret's 3rd constituency | — | RN |
| Caroline Parmentier | Pas-de-Calais's 9th constituency | — | RN |
| Francesca Pasquini | Hauts-de-Seine's 2nd constituency | NUPES | EELV |
| Emmanuel Pellerin | Hauts-de-Seine's 9th constituency | Ensemble | LREM |
| Isabelle Périgault | Seine-et-Marne's 4th constituency | UDC | LR |
| Christelle Petex-Levet | Haute-Savoie's 3rd constituency | UDC | LR |
| Bertrand Petit | Pas-de-Calais's 8th constituency | NUPES | PS |
| Sébastien Peytavie | Dordogne's 4th constituency | NUPES | G.s |
| Kévin Pfeffer | Moselle's 6th constituency | — | RN |
| Anna Pic | Manche's 4th constituency | NUPES | PS |
| René Pilato | Charente's 1st constituency | NUPES | LFI |
| François Piquemal | Haute-Garonne's 4th constituency | NUPES | LFI |
| Christophe Plassard | Charente-Maritime's 5th constituency | Ensemble | H |
| Lisette Pollet | Drôme's 2nd constituency | — | RN |
| Thomas Portes | Seine-Saint-Denis's 3rd constituency | NUPES | LFI |
| Alexandre Portier | Rhône's 9th constituency | UDC | LR |
| Stéphane Rambaud | Var's 3rd constituency | — | RN |
| Angélique Ranc | Aube's 3rd constituency | — | RN |
| Julien Rancoule | Aude's 3rd constituency | — | RN |
| Jean-Claude Raux | Loire-Atlantique's 6th constituency | NUPES | EELV |
| Nicolas Ray | Allier's 3rd constituency | — | LR |
| Davy Rimane | French Guiana's 2nd constituency | NUPES | LFI |
| Laurence Robert-Dehault | Haute-Marne's 2nd constituency | — | RN |
| Charles Rodwell | Yvelines's 1st constituency | Ensemble | Agir |
| Sébastien Rome | Hérault's 4th constituency | — | RN |
| Béatrice Roullaud | Seine-et-Marne's 6th constituency | — | RN |
| Jean-François Rousset | Aveyron's 3rd constituency | Ensemble | LREM |
| Anaïs Sabatini | Pyrénées-Orientales's 2nd constituency | — | RN |
| Alexandre Sabatou | Oise's 3rd constituency | — | RN |
| Benjamin Saint-Huile | Nord's 3rd constituency | NUPES | PS |
| Aurélien Saintoul | Hauts-de-Seine's 11th constituency | NUPES | LFI |
| Emeric Salmon | Haute-Saône's 2nd constituency | — | RN |
| Nicolas Sansu | Cher's 2nd constituency | NUPES | PCF |
| Éva Sas | Paris's 8th constituency | NUPES | EELV |
| Philippe Schreck | Var's 8th constituency | — | RN |
| Sabrina Sebaihi | Hauts-de-Seine's 4th constituency | NUPES | EELV |
| Vincent Seitlinger | Moselle's 5th constituency | UDC | LR |
| Mikaele Seo | Wallis and Futuna's constituency | Ensemble | LREM |
| Danielle Simonnet | Paris's 15th constituency | NUPES | LFI |
| Charles Sitzenstuhl | Bas-Rhin's 5th constituency | Ensemble | Agir |
| Ersilia Soudais | Seine-et-Marne's 7th constituency | NUPES | LFI |
| Violette Spillebout | Nord's 9th constituency | Ensemble | LREM |
| Anne Stambach-Terrenoir | Haute-Garonne's 2nd constituency | NUPES | LFI |
| Emmanuel Taché | Bouches-du-Rhône's 16th constituency | — | RN |
| Jean-Pierre Taite | Loire's 6th constituency | UDC | LR |
| Jean-Philippe Tanguy | Somme's 4th constituency | — | RN |
| Sarah Tanzilli | Rhône's 13th constituency | Ensemble | LREM |
| David Taupiac | Gers's 2nd constituency | — | DVG |
| Andrée Taurinya | Loire's 2nd constituency | NUPES | LFI |
| Matthias Tavel | Loire-Atlantique's 8th constituency | NUPES | LFI |
| Michaël Taverne | Nord's 12th constituency | — | RN |
| Prisca Thevenot | Hauts-de-Seine's 8th constituency | Ensemble | LREM |
| Nicolas Thierry | Gironde's 2nd constituency | NUPES | EELV |
| Mélanie Thomin | Finistère's 6th constituency | NUPES | PS |
| Jean-Marc Tellier | Pas-de-Calais's 3rd constituency | NUPES | PCF |
| Lionel Tivoli | Alpes-Maritimes's 2nd constituency | — | RN |
| Aurélie Trouvé | Seine-Saint-Denis's 9th constituency | NUPES | LFI |
| David Valence | Vosges's 2nd constituency | Ensemble | PR |
| Frédéric Valletoux | Seine-et-Marne's 2nd constituency | Ensemble | H |
| Paul Vannier | Val d'Oise's 5th constituency | NUPES | LFI |
| Antoine Vermorel-Marques | Loire's 5th constituency | UDC | LR |
| Roger Vicot | Nord's 11th constituency | NUPES | PS |
| Antoine Villedieu | Haute-Saône's 1st constituency | — | RN |
| Alexandre Vincendet | Rhône's 7th constituency | UDC | LR |
| Anne-Cécile Violland | Haute-Savoie's 5th constituency | Ensemble | H |
| Lionel Vuibert | Ardennes's 1st constituency | Ensemble | Agir |
| Léo Walter | Alpes-de-Haute-Provence's 2nd constituency | NUPES | LFI |
| Christopher Weissberg | First constituency for French residents overseas | Ensemble | LREM |
| Jiovanny William | Martinique's 1st constituency | NUPES | DVG |
| Marie-Agnès Poussier-Winsback | Seine-Maritime's 9th constituency | Ensemble | H |
