= Democratic and Republican Left =

Parliamentary group in France

Democratic and Republican Left Gauche Démocrate et Républicaine
- Chamber: National Assembly
- Legislature(s): 13th, 14th, 15th, 16th, and 17th (Fifth Republic)
- Foundation: 26 June 2007
- Member parties: PCF; MIM; PSG; Tavini; Péyi Guyane; PLR; Le Progrès
- President: Stéphane Peu and Emeline K/Bidi (co-presidents)
- Constituency: Seine-Saint-Denis's 2nd and Réunion's 4th
- Representation: 17 / 577
- Ideology: Socialism; Left-wing nationalism Overseas territories representation Communism
- Website: groupe-communiste.assemblee-nationale.fr

Democratic and Republican Left (French: Gauche Démocrate et Républicaine or GDR) is a parliamentary group in the National Assembly including representatives of the French Communist Party (PCF) as well as leftist parties with bases in Overseas France. Since 1 April 2025, the group has been co-presided by Stéphane Peu (PCF, Seine-Saint-Denis) and Emeline K/Bidi (Le Progrès, Réunion), succeeding André Chassaigne, who led the group from 2012 to 2025.

The group comprises 17 deputies following the 2024 French legislative election: eight members of the PCF and nine deputies representing overseas territories including Réunion, Martinique, French Guiana, and French Polynesia. The GDR has consistently advocated for social justice, public services, territorial equality, and the interests of both working-class communities and France's overseas departments and territories.

== History ==
=== Formation (2007) ===
The electoral record of the French Communist Party (PCF) in 2007 was marked by dismal performances, first in the presidential election in which the party's national secretary Marie-George Buffet stood as a candidate supported by the PCF within the framework of an anti-liberal alliance; she was routed in the first round, receiving just 1.93% of the overall vote, a result deemed "catastrophic" for the party. The party's result in the subsequent legislative elections was similarly middling: though it outpaced the projections of pollsters, which placed it between only 5 and 15 seats, it still fell short of the threshold of 20 deputies, then required for the formation of a parliamentary group in the National Assembly. As a result, Alain Bocquet, outgoing leader of the preceding communist group in the assembly, demanded on 18 June that the requirement for the number of deputies to form a political group be lowered to 15 from 20 then needed, with a total of 15 deputies elected under the PCF label in the legislative elections (not counting PCF dissident Maxime Gremetz or PCF associate deputies Jean-Pierre Brard and Jacques Desallangre). Bocquet, referring to the recent election of Nicolas Sarkozy in the presidential election, added "if the president of the Republic is a democrat, he will prove it", further arguing that "contrary to all predictions, the conditions for the constitution of a communist group in the National Assembly have been met, and their recognition is only a regulatory formality".

During the evening of 17 June, the second round of the legislative elections, Buffet issued an appeal to form an "open" group to carry the "people's voice" in the National Assembly, singling out the Greens (VEC) as a potential target. PCF spokesperson Olivier Dartigolles speculated that the party could secure an alliance "with the non-inscrits, with the elected officials of the DOM-TOM, with the progressive elected officials of the left", believing that the other forces on the left were sufficient to constitute a parliamentary group. Recognizing the predicament of the PCF, ecologist deputy Noël Mamère proposed that evening that the four members of the Greens elected in the legislative elections join the communist deputies in order to provide the necessary support to form a political group in the National Assembly, saying that he believed that the Green deputies accept the opening proposed by Buffet, hoping to sit along the PCF and others on the left in an "autonomous group" in the National Assembly, independent of the Socialist Party (PS); he later added that his invitation was also extended the Movement of Citizens of Jean-Pierre Chevènement, the Radical Party of the Left (PRG), and miscellaneous left. Bocquet on 18 June indicated that "the group was open to the world" but did not signify that it would accept the support of the Greens in order to establish a group.

Despite this initial outreach to the Greens, however, Buffet's initiative to form a common group with the Greens was ultimately rebuffed, ending the possibility of a "communist, republican and ecologist" group as envisaged by Mamère. Discussions between Mamère, PCF deputy Patrick Braouezec, and miscellaneous left deputies including Gérard Charasse were briefly initiated with the apparent support of the leadership of the PCF, which sought to strengthen its position in the assembly and diminish troublemakers within it ranks; however, these ultimately came to no avail, with Bocquet believing that an alliance with the Greens would be unfeasible during the debates of the Grenelle de l'environnement and legislation proposed as a result. Maxime Gremetz, ousted from the communist federation in the Somme and antagonistic towards the national party, made conditional his membership of a parliamentary group contingent on his demand that he and the other communists in the Somme excluded from the departmental federation be permitted to rejoin. With 18 communist deputies, it was necessary to secure two additional deputies to form the group.

Unable to pass the threshold of 20 deputies on their own, however, the communists – Bocquet in particular – were eventually forced to reopen the door to the Greens and PRG, with Mamère proposing a "radical, communist, and green" group. Though the PCF continued to petition for a lowering of the bar for a parliamentary group from 20 to 15 deputies, the necessary change of regulation required the assent of a majority of the National Assembly, then controlled by the Union for a Popular Movement (UMP). There being no guarantee that this would happen, Bocquet said that the communists needed to act with "pragmatism". The Democratic and Republican Left group (groupe de la Gauche démocrate et républicaine) was ultimately formed on 26 June with 24 deputies, Jean-Claude Sandrier becoming its first president; it included the deputies of the PCF (with the exception of André Gerin, who refused to join), four Greens, and two miscellaneous left deputies: Alfred Marie-Jeanne for Martinique and Huguette Bello for Réunion.

=== 13th legislature (2007–2012) ===
After leaving the PS along with Jean-Luc Mélenchon to co-found the Left Party, Marc Dolez left the Socialist, Radical, Citizen and Miscellaneous Left group to join the GDR group as an associate deputy before becoming a member on 27 January 2009. On 11 July 2010, Anny Poursinoff of the Greens was elected in a by-election in Yvelines's 10th constituency, defeating Jean-Frédéric Poisson, thus becoming the 26th member of the GDR group. On 1 September 2010, the Green deputy Yves Cochet took over the presidency of the GDR group. Maxime Gremetz was expelled from the group on 12 April 2011 after interrupting a parliamentary meeting about the Fukushima Daiichi nuclear disaster, and subsequently resigned from his seat on 16 May. Cochet left the GDR group on 6 December after being designated as an MEP, and was replaced by Roland Muzeau; this decision reflected the dissatisfaction of the Left Front at the decision of their ecologist partners, now known as Europe Ecology – The Greens (EELV), to present a common candidate with the PS against incumbent François Asensi in Seine-Saint-Denis's 11th constituency. The four ecologist deputies subsequently left the GDR group, Cochet departing on 6 December to take his seat as an MEP and the three others quitting on 7 December. Jacques Desallangre left the group on 17 February 2012.

=== 14th and 15th legislatures (2012–2022) ===
Following the 2012 legislative elections, André Chassaigne was designated by the 10 deputies of the Left Front to form a parliamentary group, with only 15 deputies now required to form a parliamentary group, again raising the possibility of seeking support from "progressive" deputies representing Réunion, Martinique, and Guadeloupe. With the support of two such deputies already confirmed, as previous members of the group, the support of two newly elected deputies in Martinique, Jean-Philippe Nilor and Bruno Nestor Azerot, was sought out. The search for the fifteenth deputy proved difficult; though Ary Chalus of Guadeloupe, another newly minted deputy, was expected to join the group, the situation was complicated by Chalus's statement on 21 June that he would associate with the Socialist group. The continued existence of the group was finally assured with the confirmation that Gabriel Serville of the Guianese Socialist Party (PSG) would sit with the GDR in the assembly, the group now reduced to 15 deputies.

In the 2017 legislative elections, the PCF and la France Insoumise, the movement founded by Jean-Luc Mélenchon prior to the presidential election, failed to establish an alliance to run common candidates in the legislative elections. Both subsequently decided to form separate parliamentary groups; Chassaigne declared that the GDR would continue on 21 June, including 11 of its own deputies and 4 from overseas France, but would not oppose the initiatives of the la France Insoumise group. Mélenchon's insistence on voting discipline respecting his movement's program proved an obstacle in any potential alliance between the two. At the time of its formation on 27 June, the parliamentary group included 16 deputies.

Pour La Réunion MP Karine Lebon sits in the group.

=== 16th legislature (2022–2024) ===
Following the 2022 French legislative election, the GDR group was reconstituted with 22 deputies—12 from the PCF and 10 from overseas territories representing Réunion, Martinique, French Guiana, and French Polynesia. André Chassaigne was reelected president for a third consecutive term. The group participated in the New Ecological and Social People's Union (NUPES) intergroup alongside La France Insoumise, Socialist, and Ecologist groups.

=== 17th legislature (2024–present) ===
The 2024 French legislative election proved challenging for the PCF, which lost several prominent deputies including national secretary Fabien Roussel in Nord, Sébastien Jumel in Seine-Maritime, and Pierre Dharréville in Bouches-du-Rhône—all three defeated by National Rally candidates. Roussel was eliminated in the first round in Nord's 20th constituency, which had been held by communists for 62 years. Despite these losses, the group survived by maintaining strong representation from overseas territories.

On 15 July 2024, André Chassaigne was reelected president of the GDR group, now comprising 17 deputies. On 18 July 2024, Emeline K/Bidi, deputy from Réunion, was elected co-president alongside Chassaigne. The co-presidency reflected the group's composition, with roughly equal numbers of PCF deputies and overseas deputies.

The summer of 2024 also saw Chassaigne stand as the New Popular Front's candidate for President of the National Assembly, but he was narrowly defeated by incumbent Yaël Braun-Pivet by 220 votes to 207.

On 30 January 2025, at age 74 and after 23 years in the Assembly, Chassaigne announced his intention to leave Parliament, stating: "It is time for me to give my place to a deputy from another generation." On 14 March 2025, he was elected deputy mayor of Saint-Amant-Roche-Savine in Puy-de-Dôme, which he had previously served as mayor from 1983 to 2010. Under French anti-cumul laws, this required him to resign his parliamentary seat within 30 days. He officially left the Assembly on 31 March 2025, replaced by his substitute Julien Brugerolles.

On 1 April 2025, Stéphane Peu, deputy for Seine-Saint-Denis, succeeded Chassaigne as president, continuing the co-presidency arrangement with K/Bidi. Peu, a member of the "refondateur" (reformist) tendency within the PCF, had advocated for broader left-wing alliances, placing him in internal opposition to national secretary Fabien Roussel during the party's 2023 congress.

== Current composition ==
As of February 2026, the GDR group comprises 17 deputies: 8 from the French Communist Party and 9 from overseas territories. The group includes three deputies from Réunion (K/Bidi, Karine Lebon, Frédéric Maillot), representatives from Martinique, French Guiana, French Polynesia, and New Caledonia, alongside PCF deputies primarily from metropolitan France.

The group holds three secretary positions in the Bureau of the National Assembly and participates in the New Popular Front parliamentary coordination, though it maintains its independence from La France Insoumise.

== List of presidents ==
Name	Term start	Term end	Notes
Jean-Claude Sandrier	26 June 2007	1 September 2010	
Yves Cochet	1 September 2010	29 November 2011	
Roland Muzeau	29 November 2011	19 June 2012	
André Chassaigne	19 June 2012	31 March 2025	
Stéphane Peu and Emeline K/Bidi	1 April 2025	present	Co-presidents

== Historical membership ==
Year	Seats	Change	Notes
2007	24 / 577	Steady	
2012	15 / 577	▼9	
2017	16 / 577	▲1	
2022	22 / 577	▲6	
2024	17 / 577	▼5	

== See also ==
- Communist, Republican, Citizen and Ecologist group
- French Communist Party
- Overseas France
