= Christophe Payet =

French politician

Members of Parliament
- In office June 19, 2002 – June 19, 2007
- Preceded by: Élie Hoarau
- Succeeded by: Patrick Lebreton

Personal details
- Born: January 10, 1940 (age 85); Cilaos, Réunion, France
- Political party: PS
- Occupation: Politician, teacher

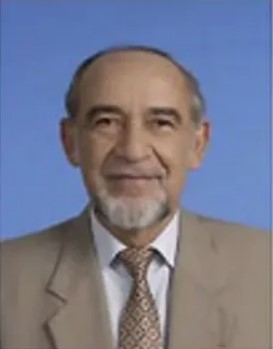
Christophe Payet

Christophe Payet (born January 10, 1940, in Cilaos, Réunion, France) is a French politician. A member of the Socialist Party (PS), he was President of the Departmental Council of Réunion from 1994 to 1998 and Member of Parliament from 2002 to 2007.

== Biography ==
In 1983, he became mayor of Petite-Île after his list won the municipal elections on the first ballot. The same year, he became a member of Réunion's regional council.

Elected General Councillor for the Petite-Île canton in 1988, he chaired the Departmental Council of Réunion from 1994 to 1998. He was re-elected in the 2001 cantonal elections, but resigned the following year due to a combination of mandates.

In the 2002 legislative elections, he was elected deputy for the Réunion's 4th constituency in the first round, with 50.3% of the vote, notably against David Lorion (UMP). He is a member of the Socialist group at the National Assembly. He did not stand for re-election in the 2007 legislative elections, which were won by the Socialist Patrick Lebreton in the second round.

After four consecutive terms in office, he did not stand for re-election in the Petite-Île municipal elections of 2008, nominating Serge Hoarau as his successor. However, Hoarau was defeated in the second round by Guito Ramoune, the official PS candidate.

== See also ==
- List of deputies of the 12th National Assembly of France
- Réunion's 4th constituency
