= K with diagonal stroke =

Letter of the Latin alphabet

Latin letter K with diagonal stroke

K with diagonal stroke (Ꝃ, ꝃ) is a letter of the Latin alphabet, derived from K with the addition of a diagonal bar through the leg.

== Usage ==
This letter is used in medieval texts as an abbreviation for kalendas, calends, as well as for karta and kartam, a document or writ. The same function could also be performed by "K with stroke" (Ꝁ, ꝁ), or "K with stroke and diagonal stroke" (Ꝅ, ꝅ).

In the Breton language, this letter is used, mainly from the fifteenth to the twentieth century, to abbreviate Ker, a prefix used in place names, similar to the Welsh caer.

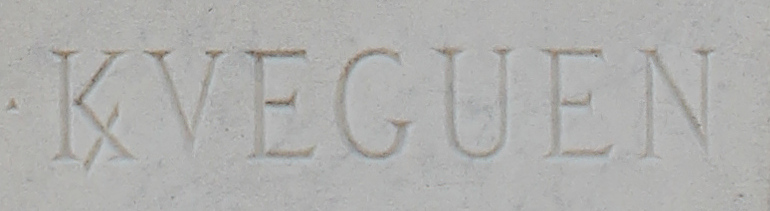
Tomb of Louis-Marie-Gabriel Le Coat de Kerveguen

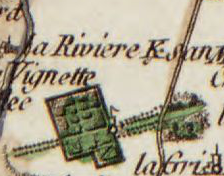
Kersan river

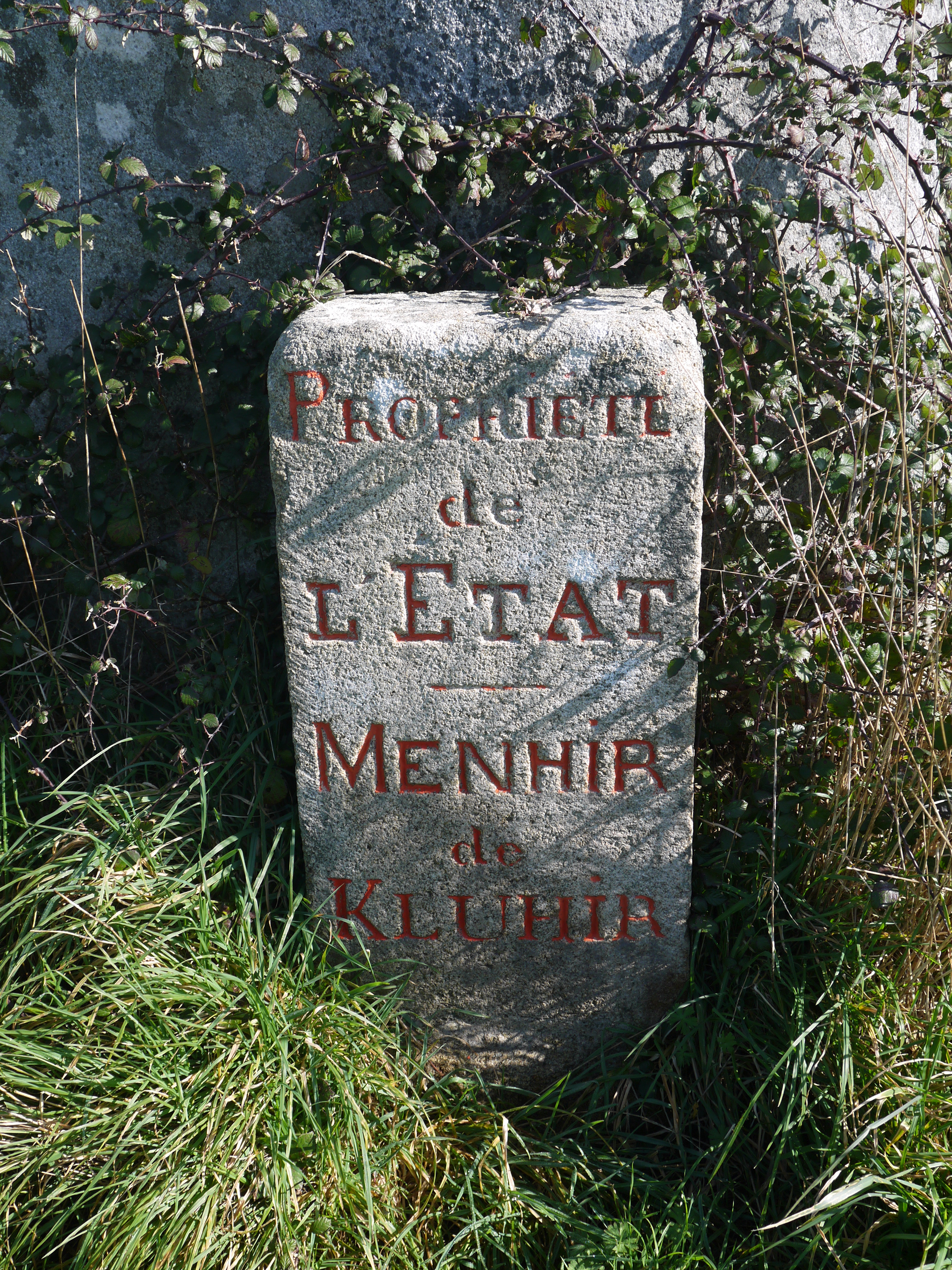
Menhir of Kerluhir

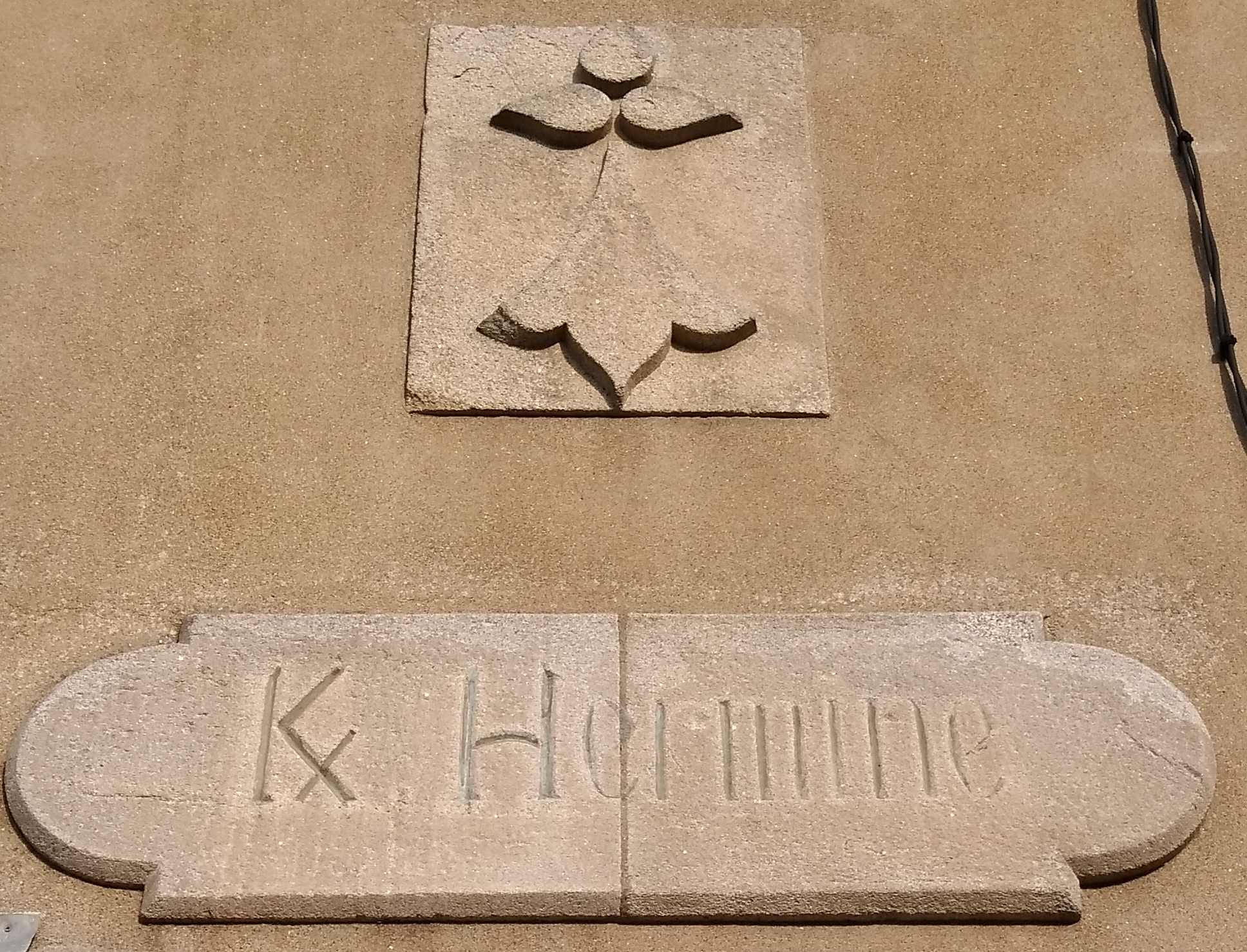
Ker Hermine

== Computer encodings ==
Capital and small K with diagonal stroke is encoded in Unicode as of version 5.1, at codepoints U+A742 and U+A743.

It may be transliterated as ⟨K'⟩ or ⟨K/⟩ as in the name of Emeline K/Bidi (French pronunciation: [kɛʁbidi]), a French Réunion politician with a Breton surname.

== Bibliography ==
- Adriano Cappelli, Lexicon Abbreviaturarum, J. J. Weber, Leipzig (1928).
