= K with stroke and diagonal stroke =

Letter of the Latin alphabet

- Ꝅ ꝅ

Usage
- Type: alphabetic
- In Unicode: U+A744, U+A745

History
Development
D46
    - 𐤊
      - Κ κ ϰ
        - 𐌊
          - K k
            - Ꝅ ꝅ

K with stroke and diagonal stroke (Ꝅ, ꝅ) is a letter of the Latin alphabet, derived from K with the addition of bars through the ascender and the leg.

== Usage ==
This letter is used in medieval texts as an abbreviation for karta and kartam, a document or writ. It was also used as an abbreviation for Kalendas at the end of the tenth century. The same function could also be performed by "K with stroke" (Ꝁ, ꝁ), or "K with diagonal stroke" (Ꝃ, ꝃ).

== Computer encodings ==
Capital and small K with stroke and diagonal stroke is encoded in Unicode as of version 5.1, at codepoints U+A744 and U+A745.

== Bibliography ==
- Adriano Cappelli, Lexicon Abbreviaturarum, J. J. Weber, Leipzig (1928).
