= Élisabeth Pochon =

French politician (1955–2026)

Member of the National Assembly for Seine-Saint-Denis's 8th constituency
- In office 20 June 2012 – 20 June 2017
- Preceded by: Patrice Calméjane
- Succeeded by: Sylvie Charrière

Personal details
- Born: 19 April 1955 Constantine, French Algeria
- Died: 24 June 2026 (aged 71)
- Party: Socialist Party

Élisabeth Pochon (19 April 1955 – 24 June 2026) was a French politician of the Socialist Party (PS) who served as Member of Parliament for Seine-Saint-Denis's 8th constituency from 2012 to 2017.

== Life and career ==
In parliament, Pochon served on the Committee on Legal Affairs from 2014 to 2017.

Ahead of the Socialist Party's 2017 primaries, Pochon publicly endorsed Vincent Peillon as the party's candidate for the presidential election later that year.

Pochon lost her seat in the 2017 election.

Pochon died on 24 June 2026, at the age of 71.
