= Valérie Gomez-Bassac =

French politician (born 1969)

Member of the National Assembly for Var's 6th constituency
- In office 21 June 2017 – 21 June 2022
- Preceded by: Josette Pons
- Succeeded by: Frank Giletti

Personal details
- Born: 16 July 1969 (age 56) Valenciennes, France
- Party: La République En Marche!

Valérie Gomez-Bassac (born 16 July 1969) is a French politician of La République En Marche! (LREM) who was a member of the French National Assembly since the 2017 to 2022, representing the department of Var.

== Political career ==
In parliament, Gomez-Bassac served as member of the Committee on Cultural Affairs and Education and the Committee on European Affairs. In addition to her committee assignments, she was part of the French-Moroccan Parliamentary Friendship Group.

Since 2019, Gomez-Bassac was one of her parliamentary group's spokespersons under the leadership of its chairman Gilles Le Gendre.

She lost her seat in the 2022 French legislative election to Frank Giletti from the National Rally.

== Political positions ==
In July 2019, Gomez-Bassac voted in favor of the French ratification of the European Union’s Comprehensive Economic and Trade Agreement (CETA) with Canada.

== Other activities ==
- Institut Français, Member of the Advisory Board (since 2017)

== See also ==
- 2017 French legislative election
