= Catherine Kamowski =

French politician

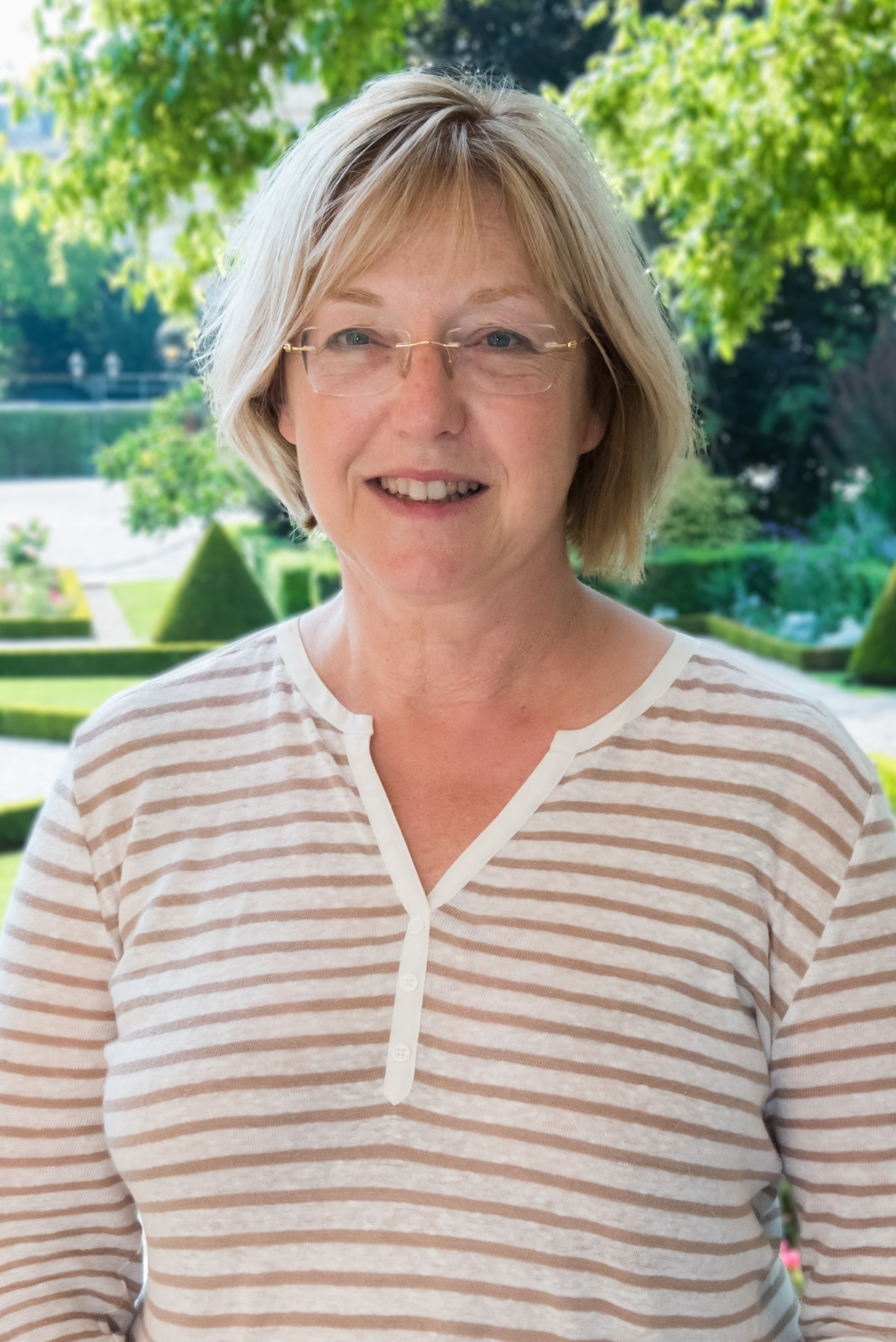

Member of the National Assembly for Isère's 5th constituency
- In office 21 June 2017 – 21 June 2022
- Preceded by: Pierre Ribeaud
- Succeeded by: Jérémie Iordanoff

Personal details
- Born: 8 April 1958 (age 68) Valenciennes, France
- Party: La République En Marche!

Catherine Kamowski (born 8 April 1958 in Valenciennes) is a French politician of La République En Marche! (LREM) who was elected to the French National Assembly on 18 June 2017, representing the department of Isère.

== Political career ==
In parliament, Kamowski serves on the Committee on Legal Affairs.

In addition to her committee assignments, Kamowski is a member of the French-Quebec Parliamentary Friendship Group. She has also been a substitute member of the French delegation to the Parliamentary Assembly of the Council of Europe (PACE) since 2019.

== Political positions ==
In 2018, Kamowski joined other co-signatories around Sébastien Nadot in officially filing a request for a commission of inquiry into the legality of French weapons sales to the Saudi-led coalition fighting in Yemen, days before an official visit of Saudi Crown Prince Mohammed bin Salman to Paris.

In July 2019, Kamowski voted in favour of the French ratification of the European Union’s Comprehensive Economic and Trade Agreement (CETA) with Canada.
