= François Brottes =

French politician

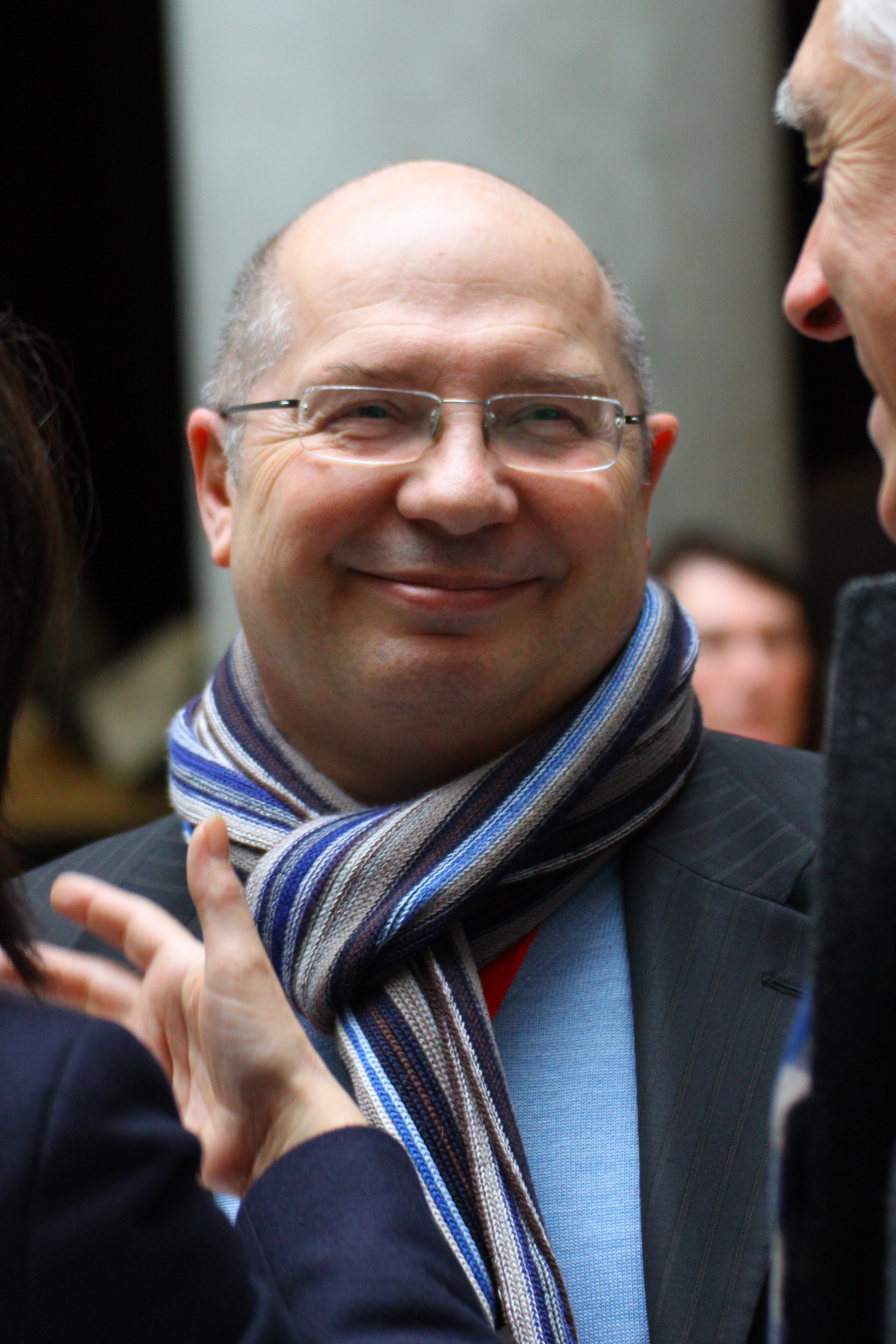
- Born: 31 March 1956
- Occupations: Politician, journalist
- Awards: Officer of the National Order of Merit (2020)

François Brottes (born 31 March 1956 in Valence, Drôme) was a member of the National Assembly of France. He represented Isère's 5th constituency from 1997 to 2012 as a member of the Socialiste, radical, citoyen et divers gauche. Brottes also serves as the mayor of Crolles.

In 2012 he was appointed director of Réseau de Transport d'Électricité, and was replaced in the assembly by his substitute, Pierre Rebeaud.
