= Anthony Cellier =

French politician (born 1975)

Member of the National Assembly for Gard's 3rd constituency
- Incumbent
- Assumed office 21 June 2017
- Preceded by: Patrice Prat
- Succeeded by: Pascale Bordes

Personal details
- Born: 1 June 1975 (age 50) Pierrelatte, France
- Party: La République En Marche!

Anthony Cellier (born 1 June 1975) is a French politician representing La République En Marche! He was elected to the French National Assembly on 18 June 2017, representing the 3rd constistuency of the department of Gard.

In the 2022 elections he lost in the second round to Pascale Bordes of National Rally.

== See also ==
- 2017 French legislative election
