= Manuéla Kéclard-Mondésir =

French politician

Member of the National Assembly for Martinique's 2nd constituency
- In office 23 April 2018 – 21 June 2022
- Preceded by: Bruno Nestor Azerot
- Succeeded by: Marcellin Nadeau

Personal details
- Born: 6 May 1971 (age 53); Le Lamentin, Martinique
- Political party: Miscellaneous left

Manuéla Kéclard-Mondésir (born 6 May 1971) is a French politician who represented Martinique's 2nd constituency on the National Assembly from 2018 to 2022.
