= Sylvie Charrière =

French politician (born 1961)

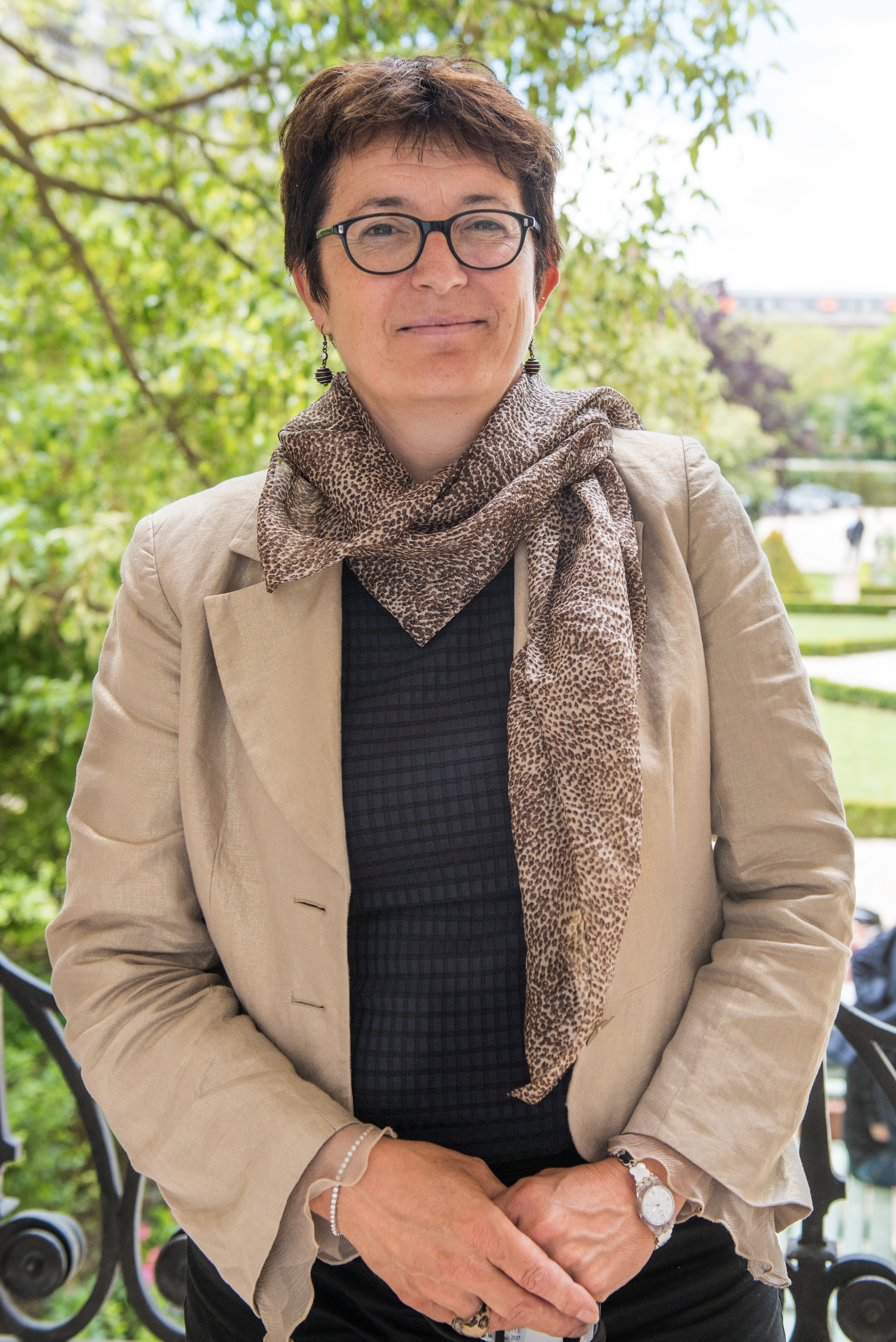

Member of the National Assembly for Seine-Saint-Denis's 8th constituency
- In office 21 June 2017 – 21 June 2022
- Preceded by: Élisabeth Pochon
- Succeeded by: Fatiha Keloua-Hachi

Personal details
- Born: 15 May 1961 (age 65) Montreuil, Seine-Saint-Denis, France
- Party: LREM

Sylvie Charrière (French pronunciation: [silvi ʃaʁjɛʁ]; born 15 May 1961) is a French politician of La République En Marche! (LREM) who served as a member of the National Assembly from 2017 to 2022, representing the department of Seine-Saint-Denis.

== Political career ==
In parliament, Charrière served on the Cultural and Education Affairs Committee.

She lost her seat in the 2022 French legislative election.

== Other activities ==
- Conseil national d'évaluation du système scolaire (CNESCO), Member

== Political positions ==
In July 2019, Charrière voted in favor of the French ratification of the European Union’s Comprehensive Economic and Trade Agreement (CETA) with Canada.

== See also ==
- 2017 French legislative election
