= Gard's 3rd constituency =

Constituency of the National Assembly of France

3rd constituency of Gard
- inline Constituency of the National Assembly of France

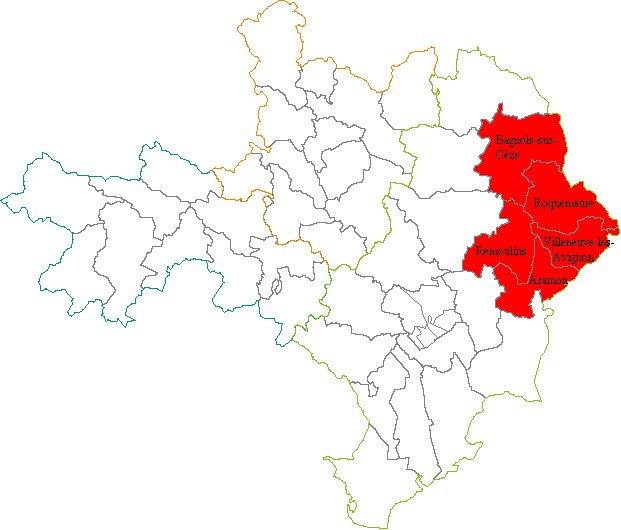
- Location of constituency in Department

- Gard in France
- Deputy: Pascale Bordes; RN
- Department: Gard

The 3rd constituency of Gard is a French legislative constituency in the Gard département. It consists of the cantons of Bagnols-sur-Cèze, Roquemaure and Villeneuve-lès-Avignon, and the communes of Aramon and Remoulins.

== Deputies ==
Election	Member	Party
2012	Patrice Prat	PS
2016	Patrice Prat	SE
2017	Anthony Cellier	LREM
2022	Pascale Bordes	RN
2024	Pascale Bordes	RN

== Election results ==
=== 2024 ===
Candidate	Party	Alliance	First round			Second round		
Candidate	Party	Alliance	Votes	%	+/–	Votes	%	+/–
Pascale Bordes	RN		31,465	47.49	+17.41	35,685	58.68	+7.36
Sabine Oromi	PCF	NFP	15,181	22.91	+2.25	25,133	41.32	new
Christian Baume	HOR	Ensemble	12,727	19.21	-7.56			
Florent Grau	LR	UDC	5,988	9.04	+2.31			
Valery Fourmi	LO		638	0.96	+0.34			
Christophe Prevost	DIV		199	0.30	-1.05			
Daniel Jean	DVD		65	0.10				
Votes			66,263	100.00		60,818	100.00	
Valid votes			66,263	97.39	-0.91	60,818	90.27	-1.48
Blank votes			1,286	1.89	+0.62	5,078	7.54	+1.32
Null votes			492	0.72	+0.29	1,476	2.19	+0.16
Turnout			68,041	70.93	+22.09	67,372	70.20	+22.13
Abstentions			27,885	29.07	-22.09	28,601	29.80	-22.13
Registered voters			95,926			95,973		
Result			RN HOLD					

=== 2022 ===
Legislative Election 2022: Gard's 3rd constituency
Party	Candidate	Votes	%	±%
RN	Pascale Bordes	13,796	30.08	+7.20
LREM (Ensemble)	Anthony Cellier	12,274	26.77	-7.16
PCF (NUPÉS)	Sabine Oromi	9,474	20.66	+3.46
LR (UDC)	Blandine Arnaud	3,087	6.73	−5.43
REC	Jean-Marie Moulin	3,043	6.64	N/A
PRG	Monique Novaretti	1,526	3.33	N/A
Others	N/A	2,657		
Turnout		45,857	48.84	+0.82
2nd round result
RN	Pascale Bordes	21,619	51.32	+10.34
LREM (Ensemble)	Anthony Cellier	20,506	48.68	−10.34
Turnout		42,125	48.07	+4.17
RN gain from LREM				

=== 2017 ===
Candidate	Label	First round		Second round	
Candidate	Label	Votes	%	Votes	%
Anthony Cellier	REM	14,832	33.93	21,908	59.02
Monique Tezenas du Montcel	FN	10,001	22.88	15,212	40.98
Muriel Dherbecourt	LR	5,315	12.16		
Geneviève Sabathé	FI	5,084	11.63		
Alexandre Pissas	DVG	2,935	6.71		
Marie-Pierre Mercier	ECO	1,601	3.66		
Patricia Garnero	DVD	1,313	3.00		
Léa Comushian	PCF	833	1.91		
Jean Isnard	DLF	513	1.17		
Marc Viot	ECO	467	1.07		
Thierry Barnabé	DIV	355	0.81		
Jean Egea	EXG	281	0.64		
Frédérique Louvard-Hilaire	DVG	186	0.43		
Votes		43,716	100.00	37,120	100.00
Valid votes		43,716	97.33	37,120	90.39
Blank votes		885	1.97	2,917	7.10
Null votes		313	0.70	1,031	2.51
Turnout		44,914	48.02	41,068	43.90
Abstentions		48,619	51.98	52,475	56.10
Registered voters		93,533		93,543	
Source: Ministry of the Interior

=== 2012 ===
2012 legislative election in Gard's 3rd constituency
Candidate	Party	First round		Second round	
Candidate	Party	Votes	%	Votes	%
Patrice Prat	PS–EELV	17,753	32.34%	23,047	41.44%
Jean-Marc Roubaud	UMP	17,266	31.45%	21,153	38.03%
Gilles Caitucoli	FN	13,355	24.33%	11,416	20.53%
Charles Menard	FG	3,916	7.13%		
Catherine Choffat	EELV dissident	1,074	1.96%		
Stéphanie Lahana	??	585	1.07%		
Nicolas Alliot	DLR	576	1.05%		
Jean Egea	LO	209	0.38%		
Nelly Guille		168	0.31%		
Valid votes		54,902	98.68%	55,616	98.51%
Spoilt and null votes		733	1.32%	843	1.49%
Votes cast / turnout		55,635	62.58%	56,459	63.50%
Abstentions		33,265	37.42%	32,449	36.50%
Registered voters		88,900	100.00%	88,908	100.00%

=== 2007 ===
Legislative Election 2007: Gard's 3rd constituency
Party	Candidate	Votes	%	±%
UMP	Jean-Marc Roubaud	33,523	48.98	
PS	Alexandre Pissas	16,268	23.77	
FN	François Bonnieux	4,829	7.05	
MoDem	Corinne Ponce-Casanova	4,094	5.98	
PCF	Marianne Chambon	2,489	3.64	
Far left	Pierre Jourlin	1,998	2.92	
Others	N/A	5,247		
Turnout		69,865	61.29	
2nd round result
UMP	Jean-Marc Roubaud	39,131	58.79	
PS	Alexandre Pissas	27,427	41.21	
Turnout		69,044	60.58	
UMP hold				

=== 2002 ===
Legislative Election 2002: Gard's 3rd constituency
Party	Candidate	Votes	%	±%
UMP	Jean-Marc Roubaud	17,536	25.70	
PS	Gerard Revol	17,020	24.95	
FN	Francois Bonnieux	13,655	20.01	
UDF	Jean-Luc Chapon	8,221	12.05	
PR	Patrice Prat	3,702	5.43	
CPNT	Gilbert Bagnol	1,789	2.62	
Others	N/A	6,305		
Turnout		69,729	67.53	
2nd round result
UMP	Jean-Marc Roubaud	28,333	43.88	
PS	Gerard Revol	24,356	37.72	
FN	Francois Bonnieux	11,873	18.39	
Turnout		66,316	64.24	
UMP gain from PS				

=== 1997 ===
Legislative Election 1997: Gard's 3rd constituency
Party	Candidate	Votes	%	±%
RPR	Jean-Marc Roubaud	14,197	22.78	
PS	Gérard Revol	13,941	22.37	
FN	Marie-Josée Cros	12,999	20.86	
PCF	Laurette Bastaroli	7,088	11.38	
DVD	Gilbert Baumet	6,314	10.13	
LV	Alain Bertolino	2,015	3.23	
DVD	Brigitte Roullaud	1,451	2.33	
Others	N/A	4,306		
Turnout		65,796	70.59	
2nd round result
PS	Gérard Revol	29,921	43.78	
RPR	Jean-Marc Roubaud	27,486	40.22	
FN	Marie-Josée Cros	10,936	16.00	
Turnout		71,182	76.38	
PS gain from RPR				
