= Seine-Saint-Denis's 8th constituency =

Constituency of the National Assembly of France

8th constituency of Seine-Saint-Denis
- inline Constituency of the National Assembly of France

- Deputy: Fatiha Keloua-Hachi; PS
- Department: Seine-Saint-Denis
- Registered voters: 60,133

The 8th constituency of Seine-Saint-Denis (French: Huitième circonscription de la Seine-Saint-Denis) is one of the 12 legislative constituencies in Seine-Saint-Denis département of France (93). Like the other 576 French constituencies, it elects one MP using the two-round system.

== Deputies ==
| Election | Member | Party | Source |
|---|---|---|---|
| 1988 | Robert Pandraud | RPR | |
| 1993 | Robert Pandraud | RPR | |
| 1997 | Robert Pandraud | RPR | |
| 2002 | Robert Pandraud | UMP | |
| 2007 | Patrice Calméjane | UMP | |
| 2012 | Élisabeth Pochon | PS | |
| 2017 | Sylvie Charrière | LREM | |
| 2022 | Fatiha Keloua-Hachi | PS | |
| 2024 | Fatiha Keloua-Hachi | PS | |

== Election results ==
=== 2024 ===
| Candidate | Party | Alliance | First round | | | Second round | | |
| Candidate | Party | Alliance | Votes | % | +/– | Votes | % | +/– |
|---|---|---|---|---|---|---|---|---|
| Fatiha Keloua-Hachi | PS | NFP | 19,193 | 49.30 | +10.83 | 24,476 | 68.41 | +14.84 |
| Sébastien Jolivet | RN | | 9,291 | 23.86 | +10.10 | 11,301 | 31.59 | N/A |
| Didier Fort | DVD | | 5,350 | 13.74 | N/A | | | |
| Franck Yonboue | LR | | 3,844 | 9.87 | -4.03 | | | |
| Sylvio Valente | REC | | 634 | 1.63 | -3.04 | | | |
| Grégory Tobeilem | LO | | 509 | 1.31 | +0.52 | | | |
| Ntela Bardai | DIV | | 86 | 0.22 | N/A | | | |
| Hélène Dupuy | DIV | | 27 | 0.07 | N/A | | | |
| Valid votes | | | 38,934 | 97.07 | -0.55 | 35,777 | 92.22 | -0.93 |
| Blank votes | | | 973 | 2.43 | +0.34 | 2,643 | 6.81 | +1.29 |
| Null votes | | | 201 | 0.50 | +0.21 | 377 | 0.97 | -0.36 |
| Turnout | | | 40,108 | 63.95 | +20.34 | 38,797 | 61.84 | +19.03 |
| Abstentions | | | 22,608 | 36.05 | -20.34 | 23,937 | 38.16 | -19.03 |
| Registered voters | | | 62,716 | | | 62,734 | | |
Source: Ministry of the Interior, Le Monde
| Result | | | | | | PS HOLD | | |

=== 2022 ===
Legislative Election 2022: Seine-Saint-Denis's 8th constituency
| Party | Candidate | Votes | % | ±% |
|---|---|---|---|---|
| PS (NUPÉS) | Fatiha Keloua-Hachi | 9,263 | 35.31 | +8.68 |
| LREM (Ensemble) | Sylvie Charrière | 5,696 | 21.71 | -11.19 |
| LR (UDC) | Geoffrey Carvalhinho | 3,647 | 13.90 | −7.17 |
| RN | Sébastien Jolivet | 3,610 | 13.76 | +3.94 |
| REC | Sylvio Valente | 1,226 | 4.67 | N/A |
| DVG | Hugo Guiraudou | 830 | 3.16 | N/A |
| DVE | Eddy Cyrilla | 745 | 2.84 | N/A |
| Others | N/A | 1,218 | | |
| Turnout | | 26,875 | 43.61 | −2.37 |
2nd round result
| PS (NUPÉS) | Fatiha Keloua-Hachi | 13,169 | 53.57 | N/A |
| LREM (Ensemble) | Sylvie Charrière | 11,413 | 46.43 | −10.03 |
| Turnout | | 24,582 | 42.81 | +4.10 |
| PS gain from LREM | | | | |

=== 2017 ===
Legislative Election 2017: Seine-Saint-Denis's 8th constituency
| Party | Candidate | Votes | % | ±% |
|---|---|---|---|---|
| LREM | Sylvie Charrière | 8,887 | 32.90 | N/A |
| LR | Patrice Calméjane | 5,692 | 21.07 | −14.53 |
| LFI | Maxence Albespy | 3,741 | 13.85 | N/A |
| FN | Alexandra Bourgoin | 2,654 | 9.82 | −2.18 |
| PS | Elisabeth Pochon | 2,550 | 9.44 | −28.44 |
| EELV | Aurelien Berthou | 901 | 3.34 | +0.73 |
| DIV | Pierre-Olivier Carel | 848 | 3.14 | N/A |
| Others | N/A | 1,743 | | |
| Turnout | | 27,651 | 45.98 | −8.33 |
2nd round result
| LREM | Sylvie Charrière | 11,635 | 56.46 | N/A |
| LR | Patrice Calméjane | 8,974 | 43.54 | −5.61 |
| Turnout | | 23,277 | 38.71 | −15.28 |
| LREM gain from PS | | Swing | | |

=== 2012 ===
Legislative Election 2012: Seine-Saint-Denis's 8th constituency
| Party | Candidate | Votes | % | ±% |
|---|---|---|---|---|
| PS | Elisabeth Pochon | 12,371 | 37.88 | +11.37 |
| UMP | Patrice Calméjane | 11,627 | 35.60 | +2.71 |
| FN | Daniel Bousselaire | 3,920 | 12.00 | +7.51 |
| FG | Bruno Bellegarde | 2,035 | 6.23 | +3.36 |
| MoDem | Frédéric Lorenzo | 852 | 2.61 | N/A |
| EELV | Aurelien Berthou | 851 | 2.61 | −0.53 |
| Others | N/A | 1,003 | | |
| Turnout | | 32,659 | 54.31 | −3.49 |
2nd round result
| PS | Elisabeth Pochon | 16,508 | 50.85 | +6.54 |
| UMP | Patrice Calméjane | 15,956 | 49.15 | −6.54 |
| Turnout | | 32,464 | 53.99 | −0.79 |
| PS gain from UMP | | | | |

=== 2007 ===
Legislative Election 2007: Seine-Saint-Denis's 8th constituency
| Party | Candidate | Votes | % | ±% |
|---|---|---|---|---|
| UMP | Patrice Calméjane | 11,316 | 32.89 | −7.90 |
| PS | Elizabeth Pochon | 9,120 | 26.51 | −3.25 |
| DVD | Claude Pernes | 7,797 | 22.67 | N/A |
| FN | Christiane Clement | 1,546 | 4.49 | −10.16 |
| Far left | Jean-Pierre Monchau | 1,088 | 3.16 | N/A |
| LV | Toufik Taaleb | 1,080 | 3.14 | N/A |
| PCF | Evelyne Brun | 987 | 2.87 | N/A |
| Others | N/A | 1,467 | | |
| Turnout | | 35,096 | 57.80 | −4.69 |
2nd round result
| UMP | Patrice Calméjane | 17,923 | 55.69 | −0.68 |
| PS | Elizabeth Pochon | 14,261 | 44.31 | +0.68 |
| Turnout | | 33,264 | 54.78 | −2.08 |
| UMP hold | | | | |

=== 2002 ===
Legislative Election 2002: Seine-Saint-Denis's 8th constituency
| Party | Candidate | Votes | % | ±% |
|---|---|---|---|---|
| UMP | Robert Pandraud | 13,960 | 40.79 | +10.82 |
| PS | Marie-Jeanne Wiemert | 10,185 | 29.76 | N/A |
| FN | Alexandra Hardy | 5,014 | 14.65 | −6.34 |
| PR | Monique Meissler | 956 | 2.79 | N/A |
| LCR | A.Laure Gabriel | 827 | 2.42 | N/A |
| Others | N/A | 3,284 | | |
| Turnout | | 34,974 | 62.49 | −0.67 |
2nd round result
| UMP | Robert Pandraud | 17,282 | 56.37 | +11.66 |
| PS | Marie-Jeanne Wiemert | 13,374 | 43.63 | N/A |
| Turnout | | 31,823 | 56.86 | −11.95 |
| UMP hold | | | | |

=== 1997 ===
Legislative Election 1997: Seine-Saint-Denis's 8th constituency
| Party | Candidate | Votes | % | ±% |
|---|---|---|---|---|
| RPR | Robert Pandraud | 10,510 | 29.97 | |
| LV | Jean-Luc Bennahmias | 9,479 | 27.03 | |
| FN | Martial Bild | 7,362 | 20.99 | |
| MRC | Emmanuel Espanol | 1,756 | 5.01 | |
| LO | Jean-Marie Lenoir | 1,477 | 4.21 | |
| DVD | Christian Bruys | 1,456 | 4.15 | |
| MEI | Olivier Philippe | 1,204 | 3.43 | |
| Far left | Jean-Claude Pruski | 909 | 2.59 | |
| Others | N/A | 914 | | |
| Turnout | | 36,593 | 63.16 | |
2nd round result
| RPR | Robert Pandraud | 17,321 | 44.71 | |
| LV | Jean-Luc Bennahmias | 16,060 | 41.45 | |
| FN | Martial Bild | 5,362 | 13.84 | |
| Turnout | | 39,863 | 68.81 | |
| RPR hold | | | | |
