= Pascale Bordes =

French politician (born 1961)

Mayor of Bagnols-sur-Cèze
- Incumbent
- Assumed office 27 March 2026
- Preceded by: Jean-Yves Chapelet

Member of the National Assembly for Gard's 3rd constituency
- In office 22 June 2022 – 13 April 2026
- Preceded by: Anthony Cellier
- Succeeded by: Catherine Dellong-Meng

Personal details
- Born: 18 October 1961 (age 64) Bagnols-sur-Cèze, France
- Party: National Rally
- Education: University of Montpellier
- Occupation: Lawyer, politician

Pascale Bordes (French pronunciation: [paskal bɔʁd]; born 18 October 1961) is a French lawyer and politician who has been mayor of Bagnols-sur-Cèze since 2026. A member of the National Rally (RN), she previously represented the 3rd constituency of the Gard department in the National Assembly from 2022.

== Career ==
Bordes is a graduate in criminal law from the University of Montpellier. She joined the bar of Nîmes in 1986 before returning to her native town of Bagnols-sur-Cèze in 2004. In 2020, she was elected a municipal councillor of Bagnols-sur-Cèze on the National Rally list.

She was elected the deputy for Gard's 3rd constituency in the 2022 legislative election for the National Rally, with 51.3% of the second-round vote, defeating outgoing deputy Anthony Cellier of La République En Marche! (LREM). She was reelected in 2024 with 58.6% of the second-round vote. In the National Assembly she sat on the Committee on Laws.

In the 2026 municipal election in Bagnols-sur-Cèze, the National Rally list she led won 52.8% of the second-round vote. On 27 March 2026 she was elected to the mayorship by the municipal council.
