= Frank Giletti =

French civil servant and politician

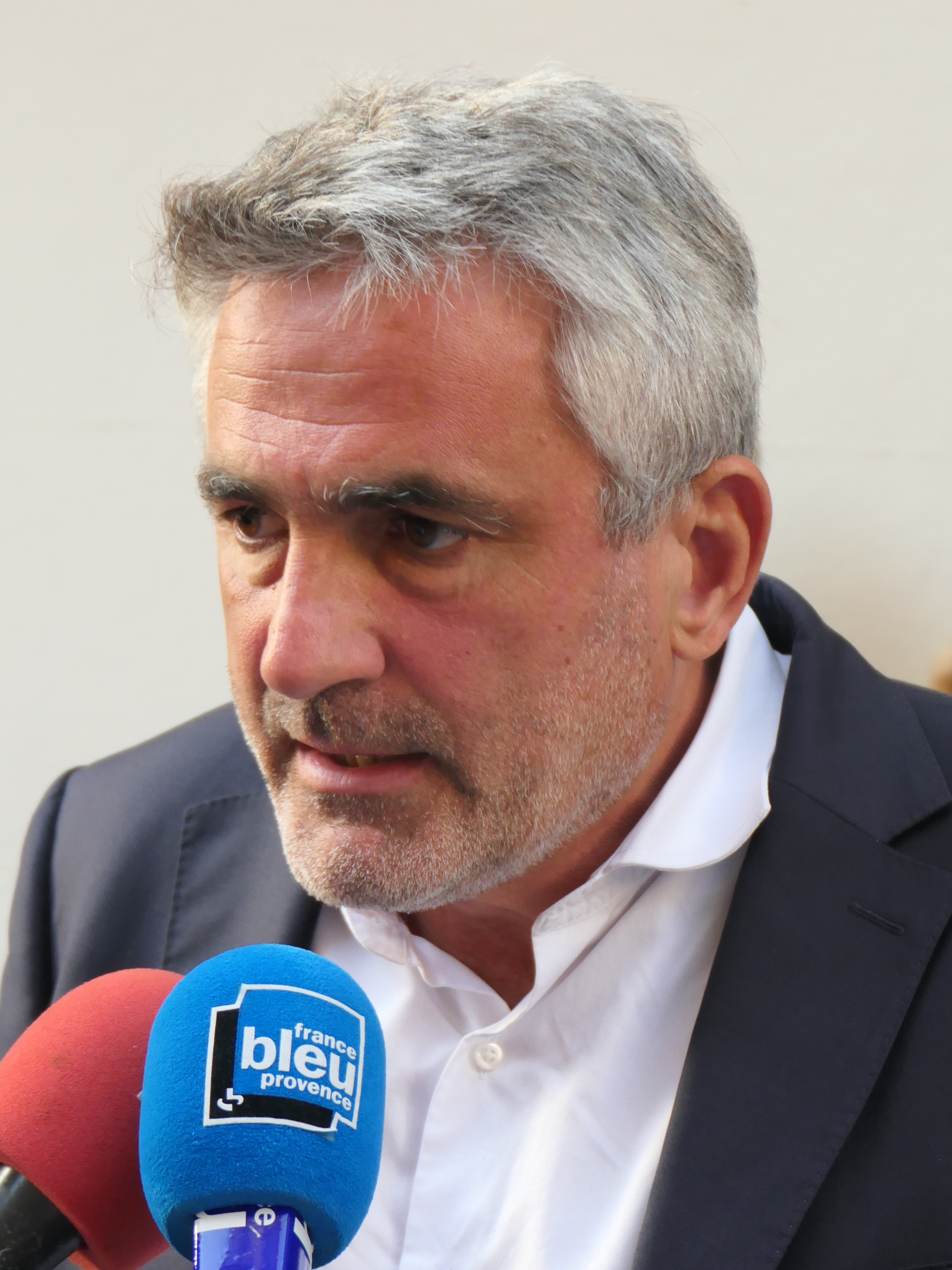
- Frank Giletti

Member of the National Assembly for Var's 6th constituency
- Incumbent
- Assumed office 22 June 2022
- Preceded by: Valérie Gomez-Bassac

Personal details
- Born: 1 March 1973 (age 53) Évreux, France
- Party: National Rally
- Education: IAE Lyon
- Occupation: Civil servant, politician

Frank Giletti (born 1 March 1973) is a French civil servant and politician of the National Rally. He has served as a deputy in the National Assembly representing Var's 6th constituency since 2022.

He is also the regional secretary of the National Rally in Var.

== Biography ==
Giletti was born in Évreux. He is a senior civil servant in the department of overseas education and was variously based in Lebanon and the United Arab Emirates. He worked as the director and head administrator of the French Protestant College of Beirut and then the Lycée Louis Massignon in Abu Dhabi.

He first joined the National Rally (then called the National Front) at the age of 18 and was elected as a municipal councilor in Toulon in 2001 before becoming a regional councilor in Puget-sur-Argens.

During the 2022 French legislative election, Giletti contested the seat of Var's 6th constituency and unseated LREM deputy Valérie Gomez-Bassac.

== See also ==
- List of deputies of the 16th National Assembly of France
