= Isère's 5th constituency =

Constituency of the National Assembly of France

5th constituency of Isère
- inline Constituency of the National Assembly of France

- Constituency in Department

- Location of Isère in France
- Deputy: Jérémie Iordanoff; LE
- Department: Isère

The 5th constituency of Isère is one of ten French legislative constituencies in the Isère département.

It was defined in 1986 to cover the then cantons of Allevard, Domène, Goncelin, Saint-Égrève, Saint-Geoire-en-Valdaine, Saint-Laurent-du-Pont and Le Touvet.

== Deputies ==
Election	Member	Party	Notes
1988	Edwige Avice	PS	
1993	Philippe Langenieux-Villard	UPF-RPR	
1997	François Brottes	PS	
2002	François Brottes	PS	
2007	François Brottes	PS	
2012	François Brottes Pierre Rebeaud	PS	Pierre Rebeaud was the substitute for François Brottes when he became director of Réseau de Transport d'Électricité
2017	Catherine Kamowski	REM	
2022	Jérémie Iordanoff	EELV	
2024	Jérémie Iordanoff	LE	

== Election results ==
=== 2024 ===
Candidate	Party	Alliance	First round			Second round		
Candidate	Party	Alliance	Votes	%	+/–	Votes	%	+/–
Jérémie Iordanoff	LE	NFP	27,991	36.42	+4.13	43,281	59.95	+9.52
Frédérique Schreiber	RN		23,674	30.80	+12.47	28,914	40.05	new
Jean-Charles Colas-Roy	REN	Ensemble	15,783	20.53	-10.27	withdrew		
Dominique Escaron	LR	UDC	7,250	9.43	new			
Philippe Garrigos	DSV		791	1.03	-0.95			
Christine Tulipe	LO		755	0.98	+0.19			
Béatrice Lacrouts	REC		619	0.81	-4.09			
Votes			76,896	100.00		72,195	100.00	
Valid votes			76,896	97.83	-0.37	72,195	92.29	-1.10
Blank votes			1,297	1.65	+0.25	5,005	6.40	+1.52
Null votes			405	0.52	+0.12	1,029	1.32	-0.41
Turnout			78,598	73.49	+21.57	78,229	73.14	+23.07
Abstentions			28,351	26.51	-21.57	28,733	26.86	+23.07
Registered voters			106,949			106,962		
Result			LE HOLD					

=== 2022 ===
Legislative Election 2022: Isère's 5th constituency
Party	Candidate	Votes	%	±%
EELV (NUPÉS)	Jérémie Iordanoff	17,457	32.29	+2.44
LREM (Ensemble)	Florence Jay	16,651	30.80	-9.78
RN	Jérôme Santana	9,909	18.33	+6.54
FGR	Frédéric Vergez	2,887	5.34	N/A
REC	Quentin Feres	2,647	4.90	N/A
DVE	Frédéric Rosset	1,460	2.70	N/A
Others	N/A	3,053		
Turnout		54,064	51.92	+0.81
2nd round result
EELV (NUPÉS)	Jérémie Iordanoff	25,010	50.43	N/A
LREM (Ensemble)	Florence Jay	24,580	49.57	−17.14
Turnout		49,590	50.07	+9.52
EELV gain from LREM				

=== 2017 ===
Candidate	Label	First round		Second round	
Candidate	Label	Votes	%	Votes	%
Catherine Kamowski	REM	20,917	40.58	24,136	66.71
Philippe Langenieux-Villard	LR	7,023	13.62	12,046	33.29
Patrice Brun	FI	6,833	13.26		
Muriel Burgaz	FN	6,078	11.79		
Éliane Giraud	PS	3,807	7.39		
Gaël Roustan	ECO	3,688	7.15		
Sylvie Guinand	PCF	1,056	2.05		
Ludovic Blanco	DLF	787	1.53		
Azzédine Chared	ECO	405	0.79		
Valérie Chénard	DIV	382	0.74		
Christine Tulipe	EXG	294	0.57		
Alice Pelletier	EXG	278	0.54		
Votes		51,548	100.00	36,182	100.00
Valid votes		51,548	98.58	36,182	87.21
Blank votes		561	1.07	4,052	9.77
Null votes		180	0.34	1,254	3.02
Turnout		52,289	51.11	41,488	40.55
Abstentions		50,011	48.89	60,816	59.45
Registered voters		102,300		102,304	
Source: Ministry of the Interior

=== 2012 ===
2012 legislative election in Isere's 5th constituency
Candidate	Party	First round		Second round	
Candidate	Party	Votes	%	Votes	%
François Brottes	PS	25,598	43.85%	32,762	61.85%
Michel Bernard	UMP	14,691	25.16%	20,305	38.34%
Jean Maria	FN	7,980	13.67%		
Vincent Gay	EELV	3,656	6.26%		
Bruno Diaz	FG	3,596	6.16%		
Marc Lizere	MoDem	900	1.54%		
Ophélie Rota	??	613	1.05%		
Jean-Jacques Tournon	AEI	511	0.88%		
Faouzia Perrin		328	0.56%		
Emmanuel Roussel		319	0.55%		
Christine Tulipe	LO	187	0.32%		
Valid votes		58,379	99.11%	52,967	97.50%
Spoilt and null votes		524	0.89%	1,358	2.50%
Votes cast / turnout		58,903	60.15%	54,325	55.47%
Abstentions		39,030	39.85%	43,604	44.53%
Registered voters		97,933	100.00%	97,929	100.00%

=== 2007 ===
Legislative Election 2007: Isère's 5th constituency
Party	Candidate	Votes	%	±%
UMP	Michel Savin	22,743	40.04	
PS	François Brottes	20,191	35.55	
MoDem	Marc Lizere	4,101	7.22	
LV	Bruno Joux	2,378	4.19	
FN	Marielle Court	1,756	3.09	
PCF	Jacky Coche	1,535	2.70	
Far left	Patrick Seris	1,364	2.40	
Others	N/A	2,736		
Turnout		57,490	61.76	
2nd round result
PS	François Brottes	31,237	53.36	
UMP	Michel Savin	27,301	46.64	
Turnout		59,570	64.00	
PS hold				

=== 2002 ===
Legislative Election 2002: Isère's 5th constituency
Party	Candidate	Votes	%	±%
UMP	Philippe Langenieux Villard	20,343	37.61	
PS	François Brottes	19,026	35.18	
FN	François Veyret	5,527	10.22	
LV	Didier Deplancke	2,245	4.15	
PCF	Faouzia Delmotte	1,634	3.02	
PR	Jean-François Delahais	1,256	2.32	
Others	N/A	4,058		
Turnout		54,946	66.05	
2nd round result
PS	François Brottes	25,692	51.10	
UMP	Philippe Langenieux Villard	24,589	48.90	
Turnout		51,642	62.08	
PS hold				

=== 1997 ===
Legislative Election 1997: Isère's 5th constituency
Party	Candidate	Votes	%	±%
RPR	Philippe Langenieux-Villard	15,404	31.89	
PS	François Brottes	11,704	24.23	
FN	Jackie Machu	6,758	13.99	
MRC	Jean-François Delahais	6,382	13.21	
LV	Britgitte Legal Robinet	2,417	5.00	
LO	Jean Ratte	1,583	3.28	
DIV	Cécile D'anterroches	1,144	2.37	
Others	N/A	2,904		
Turnout		50,729	68.44	
2nd round result
PS	François Brottes	26,562	51.71	
RPR	Philippe Langenieux-Villard	24,805	48.29	
Turnout		54,272	73.22	
PS gain from RPR				
