= Fatiha Keloua-Hachi =

French politician

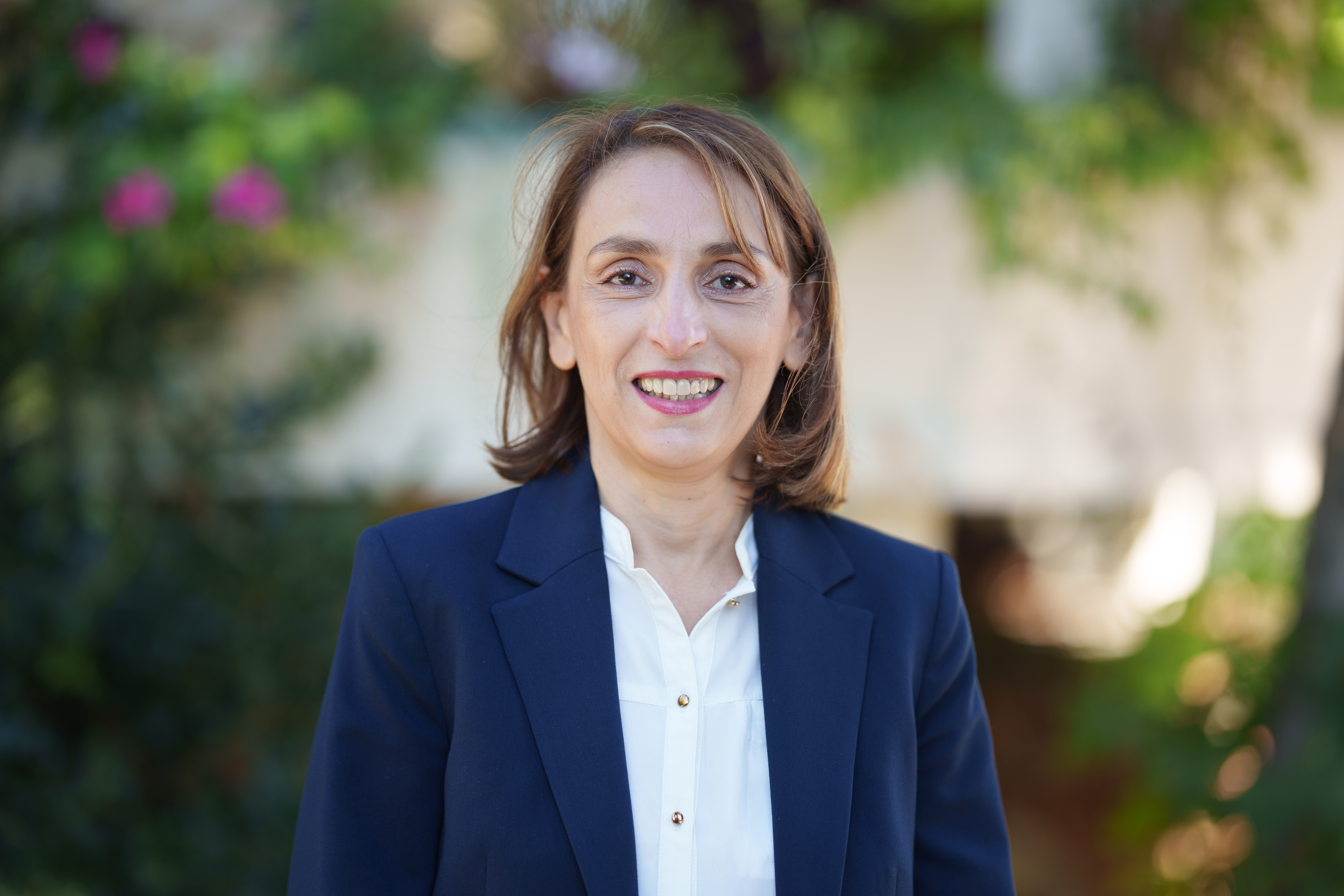

Member of the National Assembly for Seine-Saint-Denis's 8th constituency
- In office 22 June 2022 – 9 June 2024
- Preceded by: Sylvie Charrière

Councilor of Rosny-sous-Bois
- Incumbent
- Assumed office 4 July 2020

Personal details
- Born: 5 June 1971 (age 54) Paris, France
- Party: PS
- Other political affiliations: NUPES
- Occupation: Politician

Fatiha Keloua-Hachi (born 5 June 1971) is a French politician from the Socialist Party (NUPES). She was elected as a deputy for Seine-Saint-Denis's 8th constituency in the 2022 French legislative election.

== Early life ==
Fatiha Keloua Hachi was born in Paris to Algerian parents from Taourirt Ighil. She grew up in Montreuil, and studied literature, and then worked as a modern literature teacher for more than 28 years. She also works as a trainer in language proficiency, and as a teacher at the University of Créteil. In 2021 she joined the Great Poverty and Priority Education Mission at the Academy of Créteil.

== Political career ==
Long committed to the Socialist Party, Keloua-Hachi was elected in 2020 on the union list of the left Rosny Ecological and Solidarity, opposition municipal councilor.

In the legislative elections of 2022, Keloua-Hachi is a candidate in the Seine-Saint-Denis's 8th constituency with the nomination of NUPES. She obtained 35.31% of the vote in the first round, coming first in the three cities of the constituency, facing outgoing MP Sylvie Charrière who obtained 21.71% of the vote. In the second round she obtained 53.57% of the vote and was elected deputy.

In the Assembly, Keloua-Hachi sat in the Socialists & Related Groups and became a member of the Committee on Cultural Affairs and Education.

Keloua Hachi was the candidate presented by the NUPES for the election of the President of the National Assembly which took place on June 28, 2022. She won 146 votes in the first round and 144 votes in the second, Yaël Braun-Pivet being elected to the perch at the end of the second round of voting.

== Political positions ==
In 2023, Keloua-Hachi publicly endorsed the re-election of the Socialist Party's chairman Olivier Faure.

== See also ==
- List of deputies of the 16th National Assembly of France
