= Var's 6th constituency =

Constituency of the National Assembly of France

6th constituency of Var
- inline Constituency of the National Assembly of France

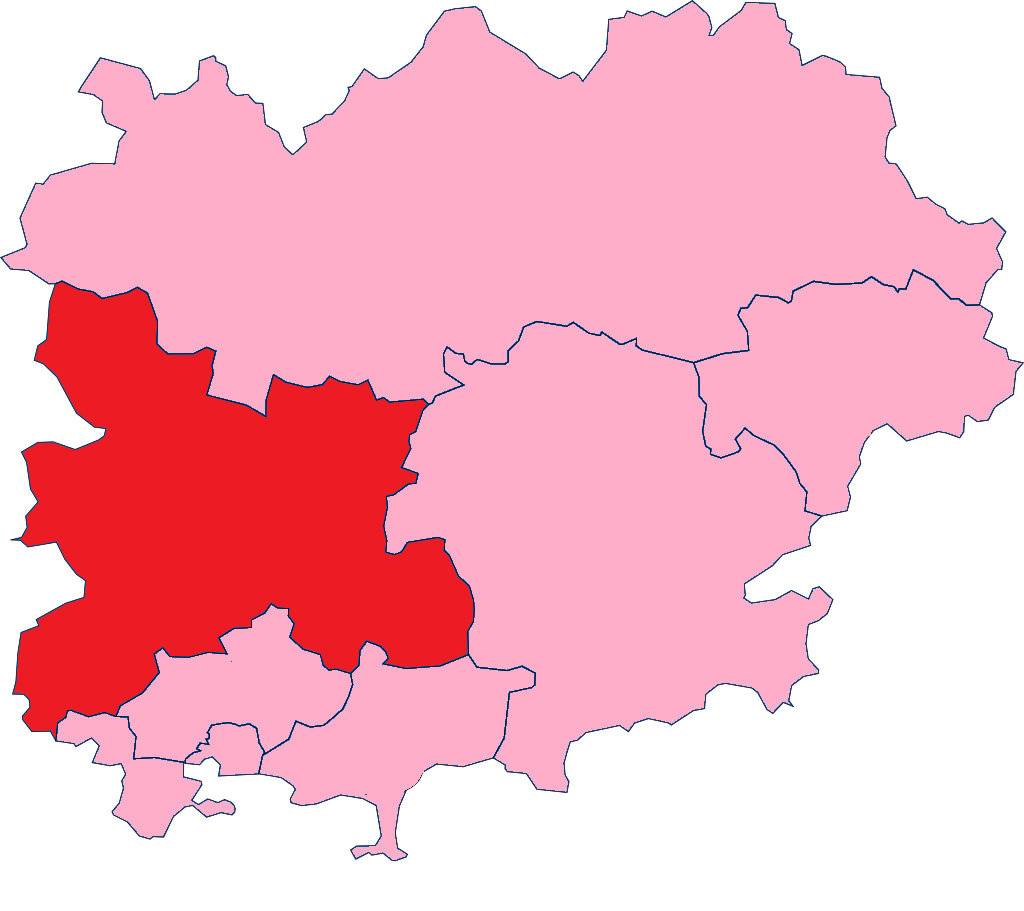
- Var's 6th Constituency shown within the Var
- Deputy: Frank Giletti; RN
- Department: Var
- Cantons: Le Beausset, Brignoles, Cuers, La Roquebrussanne, Saint-Maximin-la-Sainte-Beaume
- Registered voters: 118,392

The 6th constituency of the Var (French: Sixième circonscription du Var) is a French legislative constituency in the Var département. Like the other 576 French constituencies, it elects one MP using the two-round system, with a run-off if no candidate receives over 50% of the vote in the first round.

== Description ==
The 6th constituency of the Var lies in the west of the department to the north of Toulon.

== Assembly members ==
Election	Member	Party
1988	Hubert Falco	UDF
1993	Hubert Falco	UDF
1996	Maurice Janetti	PS
1997	Maurice Janetti	PS
2002	Josette Pons	UMP
2007	Josette Pons	UMP
2012	Josette Pons	UMP
2017	Valérie Gomez-Bassac	LREM
2022	Frank Giletti	RN

== Election results ==
=== 2024 ===
Legislative Election 2024: Var's 6th constituency
Party	Candidate	Votes	%	±%
RN	Frank Giletti	45,882	53.51	+19.20
REC	Sandra Cahoreau	1,508	1.76	−5.79
PCF (NFP)	Sylvie Vinceneux	14,683	17.12	−0.68
REG	Didier Cade	1,968	2.30	n/a
LR	Frédéric Herbaut	5,527	6.45	+0.19
UDI (Ensemble)	Fabrice Albert	15,451	18.02	n/a
LO	Louis Gueyrard	726	0.85	n/a
Turnout		85,745	97.47	+51.31
Registered electors		128,858		
RN hold				

=== 2022 ===
Legislative Election 2022: Var's 6th constituency
Party	Candidate	Votes	%	±%
RN	Frank Giletti	19,832	34.31	+8.54
LREM (Ensemble)	Valérie Gomez-Bassac	13,988	24.20	-10.01
PCF (NUPÉS)	Alain Bolla	10,289	17.80	+2.92
REC	Elisabeth Lalesart	4,366	7.55	N/A
LR (UDC)	Jean-Michel Constans	3,619	6.26	−8.94
DVE	Laurence Luccioni	1,365	2.36	N/A
Others	N/A	4,343	7.52	
Turnout		57,802	46.16	+1.39
2nd round result
RN	Frank Giletti	30,241	56.63	+12.52
LREM (Ensemble)	Valérie Gomez-Bassac	23,164	43.37	−12.52
Turnout		53,405	44.65	−0.12
RN gain from LREM				

=== 2017 ===
Legislative Election 2017: Var's 6th constituency
Party	Candidate	Votes	%	±%
LREM	Valérie Gomez-Bassac	18,133	34.21	
FN	Jérôme Riviere	13,661	25.77	
LR	Marc Lauriol	8,057	15.20	
LFI	Jill Caziconstantinos	5,538	10.45	
PS	Cécile Laublet	1,269	2.39	
DVD	Maryse Rétali	1,094	2.06	
PCF	Laurent Carratala	1,083	2.04	
Others	N/A	4,176		
Turnout		53,011	44.77	
2nd round result
LREM	Valérie Gomez-Bassac	24,541	55.89	
FN	Jérôme Riviere	19,371	44.11	
Turnout		43,912	37.09	
LREM gain from LR				

=== 2012 ===
Legislative Election 2012: Var's 6th constituency
Party	Candidate	Votes	%	±%
UMP	Josette Pons	22,420	35.65	
FN	Armelle De Pierrefeu	15,707	24.97	
EELV	Delphine Van Hoorebeke	12,990	20.65	
DVG	Gérard Bleinc	4,750	7.55	
FG	Alain Bolla	3,892	6.19	
NM	Christophe Bolla	1,460	2.32	
Others	N/A	1,674		
Turnout		62,893	58.14	
2nd round result
UMP	Josette Pons	29,027	60.67	
FN	Armelle De Pierrefeu	18,820	39.33	
Turnout		47,847	44.14	
UMP hold				

=== 2007 ===
Legislative Election 2007: Var's 6th constituency
Party	Candidate	Votes	%	±%
UMP	Josette Pons	50,423	52.03	
PS	Michaël Latz	17,692	18.25	
FN	Régis Chevrot	7,115	7.34	
MoDem	Dominique Blanc	6,299	6.50	
PCF	Catherine Lecoq	4,192	4.33	
DVE	Robert Silvani	2,341	2.42	
Far left	Philippe Raignault	2,193	2.26	
Others	N/A	6,664		
Turnout		98,645	60.47	
UMP hold				

=== 2002 ===
Legislative Election 2002: Var's 6th constituency
Party	Candidate	Votes	%	±%
UMP	Josette Pons	27,554	31.33	
FN	Helene Tudury	18,131	20.61	
PS	Guy Menut	17,959	20.42	
PCF	Claude Gilardo	5,724	6.51	
UDF	Muriel Bovis	4,576	5.20	
CPNT	Marc Meissel	3,094	3.52	
DVD	Yves Pelletier	2,760	3.14	
Others	N/A	8,161		
Turnout		89,815	64.71	
2nd round result
UMP	Josette Pons	38,743	46.41	
PS	Guy Menut	28,433	34.06	
FN	Helene Tudury	16,302	19.53	
Turnout		85,477	61.58	
UMP gain from PS				

=== 1997 ===
Legislative Election 1997: Var's 6th constituency
Party	Candidate	Votes	%	±%
UDF	Josette Pons	22,662	29.04	
PS	Maurice Janetti	18,151	23.26	
FN	Jacques Tudury	17,470	22.39	
PCF	Guy Guigou	12,107	15.52	
DVD	Arlette Aude	2,624	3.36	
GE	Christine Cavanna	2,520	3.23	
LV	Jean Masse	2,494	3.20	
Turnout		81,200	68.84	
2nd round result
PS	Maurice Janetti	35,566	41.69	
UDF	Josette Pons	34,516	40.46	
FN	Jacques Tudury	15,222	17.84	
Turnout		87,972	75.48	
PS gain from UDF				
