= Jérémie Iordanoff =

French politician (born 1983)

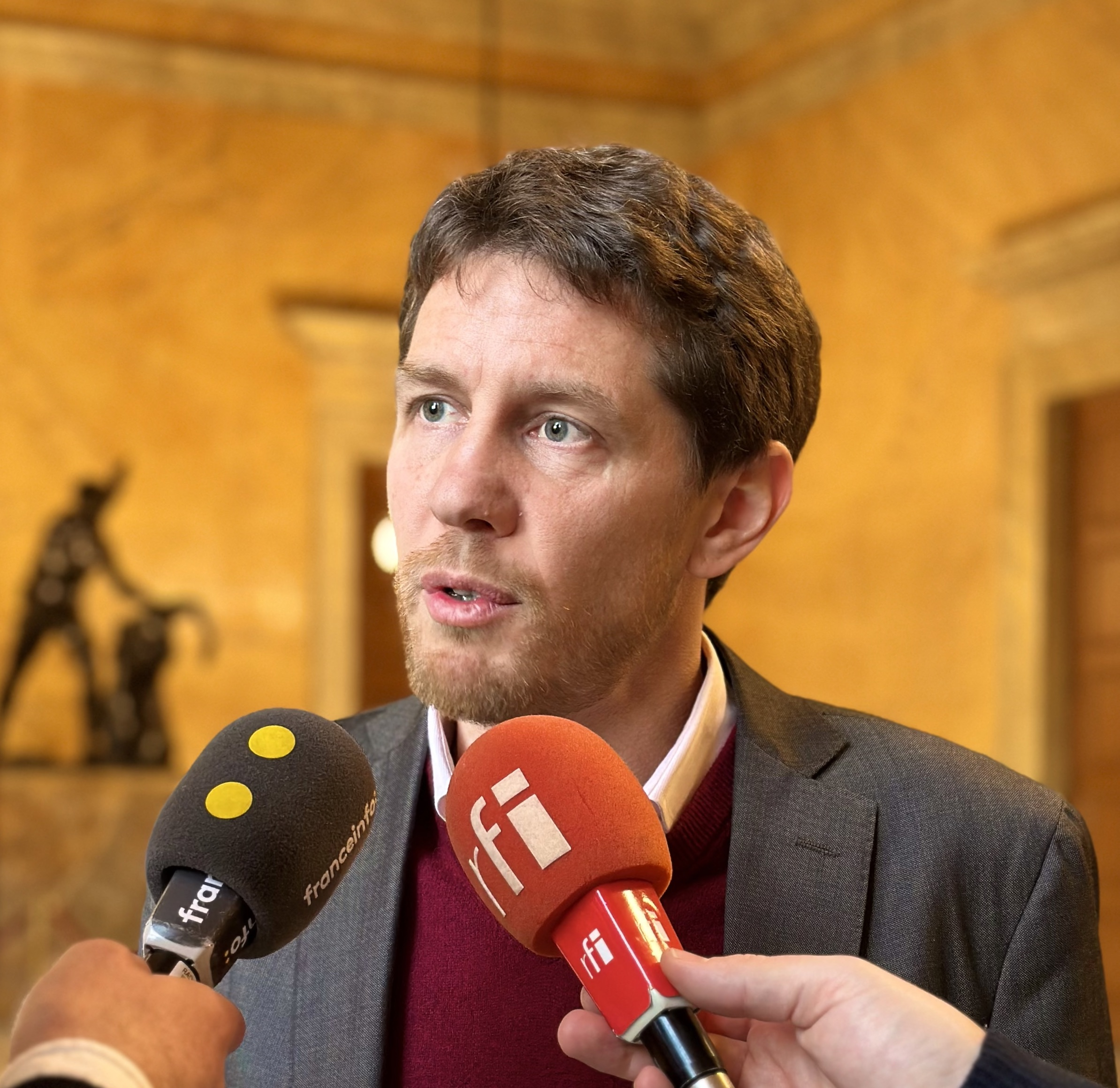
- Jérémie Iordanoff in 2023

Member of the National Assembly for Isère's 5th constituency
- Incumbent
- Assumed office 22 June 2022
- Preceded by: Catherine Kamowski

Vice president of the National Assembly
- Incumbent
- Assumed office 22 October 2024
- Preceded by: Annie Genevard

Personal details
- Born: 2 February 1983 (age 43) Laxou, France
- Party: Europe Ecology – The Greens
- Other political affiliations: NUPES (2022-2024); NFP (2024-)

Jérémie Iordanoff (born 2 February 1983) is a French politician. As a member of Europe Ecology – The Greens, he was elected member of parliament for Isère's 5th constituency in the 2022 French legislative election.

== See also ==
- List of deputies of the 16th National Assembly of France
