= Marcellin Nadeau =

French politician (born 1962)

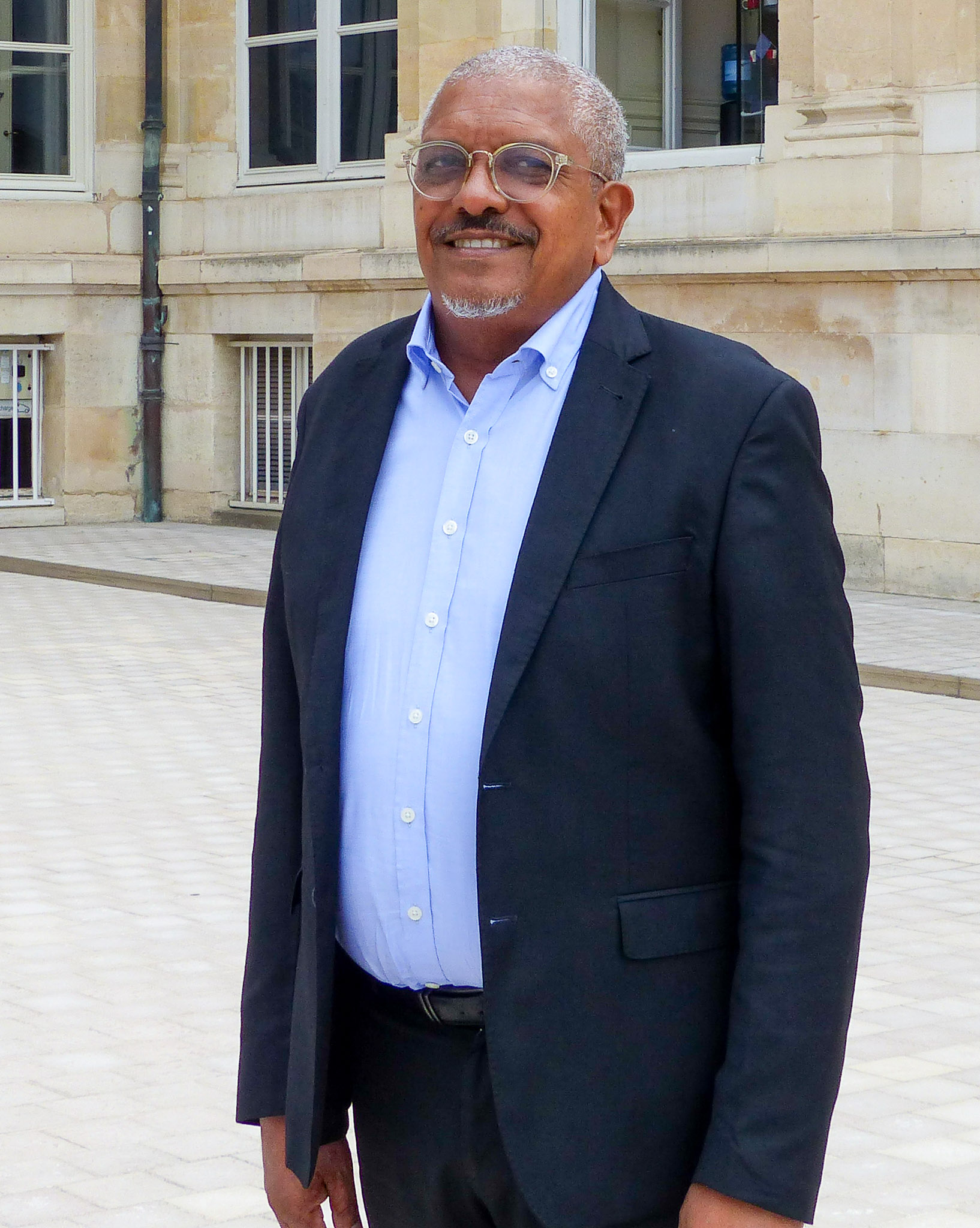

Member of the National Assembly for Martinique's 2nd constituency
- Incumbent
- Assumed office 22 June 2022
- Preceded by: Manuéla Kéclard-Mondésir

Personal details
- Born: 2 November 1962 (age 63) Saint-Pierre, Martinique
- Party: Péyi-A
- Other political affiliations: NUPES (2022)

Marcellin Nadeau (born 2 November 1962) is a French politician. He became the Member of Parliament for Martinique's 2nd constituency in the 2022 French legislative election.

== See also ==
- List of deputies of the 16th National Assembly of France
