= Patrick Lebreton =

French politician

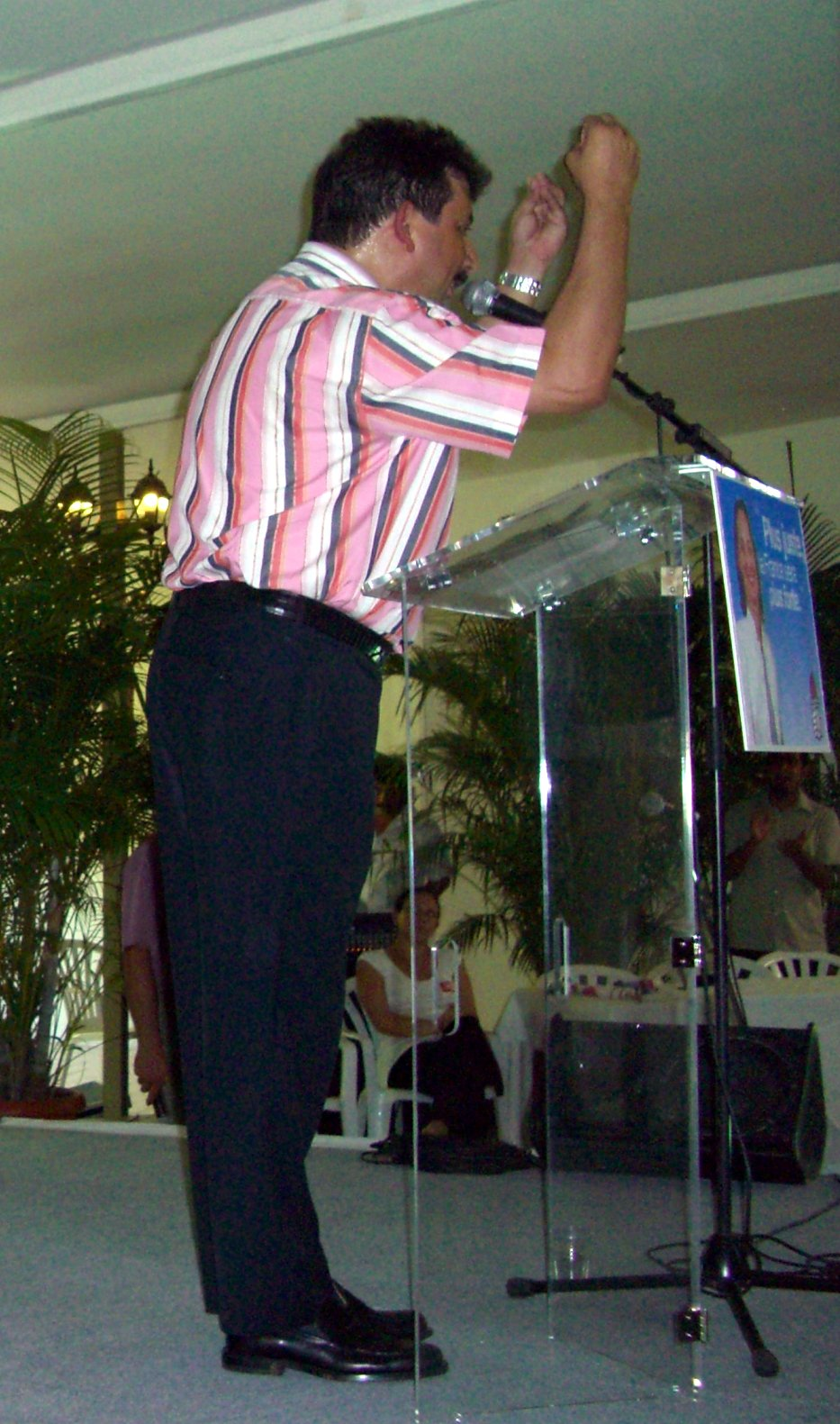

Member of the French National Assembly for Réunion
- In office 20 June 2007 – 2017
- Succeeded by: David Lorion

Mayor of Saint-Joseph
- Incumbent
- Assumed office 19 March 2001

Personal details
- Born: 6 September 1963 (age 62) Saint-Joseph, Réunion
- Party: Socialist Party

Patrick Lebreton (born 6 September 1963) was a member of the National Assembly of France from 2007 to 2017, representing the island of Réunion's 4th constituency, as a member of the Socialiste, radical, citoyen et divers gauche.
