= Communist group (National Assembly) =

Former parliamentary group in the French National Assembly

Communist group Groupe communiste
- Founded: 1924
- Dissolved: 2007
- Ideology: Communism; Socialism; Left-wing politics
- Political position: Left-wing to far-left
- National affiliation: French Communist Party

The communist group (French: Groupe communiste) was a parliamentary group in the National Assembly of France that existed from 1924 to 2007. Historically composed primarily of members of the French Communist Party (PCF), the group existed under various names throughout its history, making it one of the longest-established parliamentary groups in French legislative history before its transformation into the Democratic and Republican Left group in 2007. Throughout its history, the group adapted its composition and name to maintain parliamentary representation, incorporating deputies from communist-affiliated parties in Overseas France, as well as occasionally allied left-wing parties, to meet minimum membership requirements for parliamentary group formation.

== History ==
=== Third Republic (1924–1940) ===
The communist group was first established in 1924 following legislative elections, when the French Communist Party won 26 seats and 9.8% of votes. This marked the first formal organization of communist deputies in the Chamber of Deputies under the French Third Republic. The group experienced significant growth during the Popular Front period. In 1936, the PCF won 72 seats with 15% of votes, and its 72 deputies formed an important parliamentary force. On 26 September 1939, following the Molotov–Ribbentrop Pact, the French government dissolved the PCF. To maintain parliamentary activity, communist deputies created the "French Workers' and Peasants' Group" on 28 September 1939. However, deputies who refused to condemn the German-Soviet pact were stripped of their mandates on 21 January 1940.

=== Fourth Republic (1946–1958) ===
Following Liberation and the establishment of the French Fourth Republic, the PCF emerged as France's largest party. In October 1945, the party won 26% of votes and became the leading force in the Constituent Assembly. In November 1946, the PCF achieved its best-ever result with 28.6% of votes, 5,489,000 votes, and 169 deputies. The party counted more than 800,000 members and was considered the first party of France. Five communist ministers entered government, with Maurice Thorez serving as vice-president of the council. However, the party was excluded from government after May 1947 amid Cold War tensions. The communist group remained a major parliamentary force throughout the Fourth Republic. In the 1956 elections, the PCF won 150 seats, representing a quarter of deputies in the National Assembly.

=== Fifth Republic (1958–2007) ===
==== Early Fifth Republic (1958–1981) ====
The transition to the French Fifth Republic and its two-round system dealt a severe blow to the PCF. In 1958, the party won 18.9% of votes but only 10 seats, insufficient to form a parliamentary group. Communist deputies thus sat as non-inscrits (unaffiliated) until 1962. The communist group was reconstituted following the 1962 legislative election, when the PCF won 41 seats with 21.8% of first-round votes. The 1967 election brought the group to 71 deputies with 22.5% of first-round votes—the group's best Fifth Republic performance. Following early elections after May 1968, the PCF fell to 34 deputies with 20% of votes. Recovery began with the 1973 election (73 deputies) and peaked in 1978, when the group reached 86 deputies with 20.5% of first-round votes—the party's best Fifth Republic score. The group included 20 teachers, 14 metalworkers, and represented the only working-class deputies in the Assembly.

==== Decline and adaptation (1981–2007) ====
The 1981 legislative election marked the beginning of long-term decline as the Socialist Party became the dominant left-wing force. The communist group steadily contracted over subsequent decades. In 1988, the National Assembly lowered the threshold for forming parliamentary groups from 30 to 20 deputies, allowing reconstitution of the communist group with 25 members. From 2002, the group adopted the name "Communist and Republican group" (groupe des député-e-s Communistes et Républicains) to reflect the inclusion of non-PCF members from allied parties like the Convention for a Progressive Alternative.

==== Dissolution and transformation (2007) ====
The 2007 legislative election proved fatal for the communist group's independent existence. Presidential candidate Marie-George Buffet received only 1.93% of votes, and the PCF won just 15 deputies—insufficient to form a group independently for the first time since 1959. Unable to meet the threshold of 20 deputies required to form a parliamentary group, communist deputies joined with four Green deputies and two overseas deputies to form the Democratic and Republican Left group (Groupe de la Gauche démocrate et républicaine, GDR) on 26 June 2007, with 24 total members. Jean-Claude Sandrier became the new group's first president. This transformation marked the end of the historic communist group after 83 years of existence.

== Electoral performance ==
The communist group experienced significant fluctuations in size throughout its history:

- Peak under Third Republic: 72 deputies (1936)
- Peak under Fourth Republic: 182 deputies (1946)
- Peak under Fifth Republic: 86 deputies (1978)
- Final strength: 15 PCF deputies (2007, insufficient to form independent group)

== Legacy ==
The communist group's transformation into the GDR represented a strategic adaptation to maintain parliamentary representation for the PCF in the face of declining electoral support. The broader GDR coalition allowed communist deputies to preserve their voice in the National Assembly while acknowledging their inability to independently meet minimum membership requirements for the first time in nearly five decades.

== See also ==
- French Communist Party
- Democratic and Republican Left group
- Communist group (Senate)
- Overseas France
