= David Lorion =

French politician

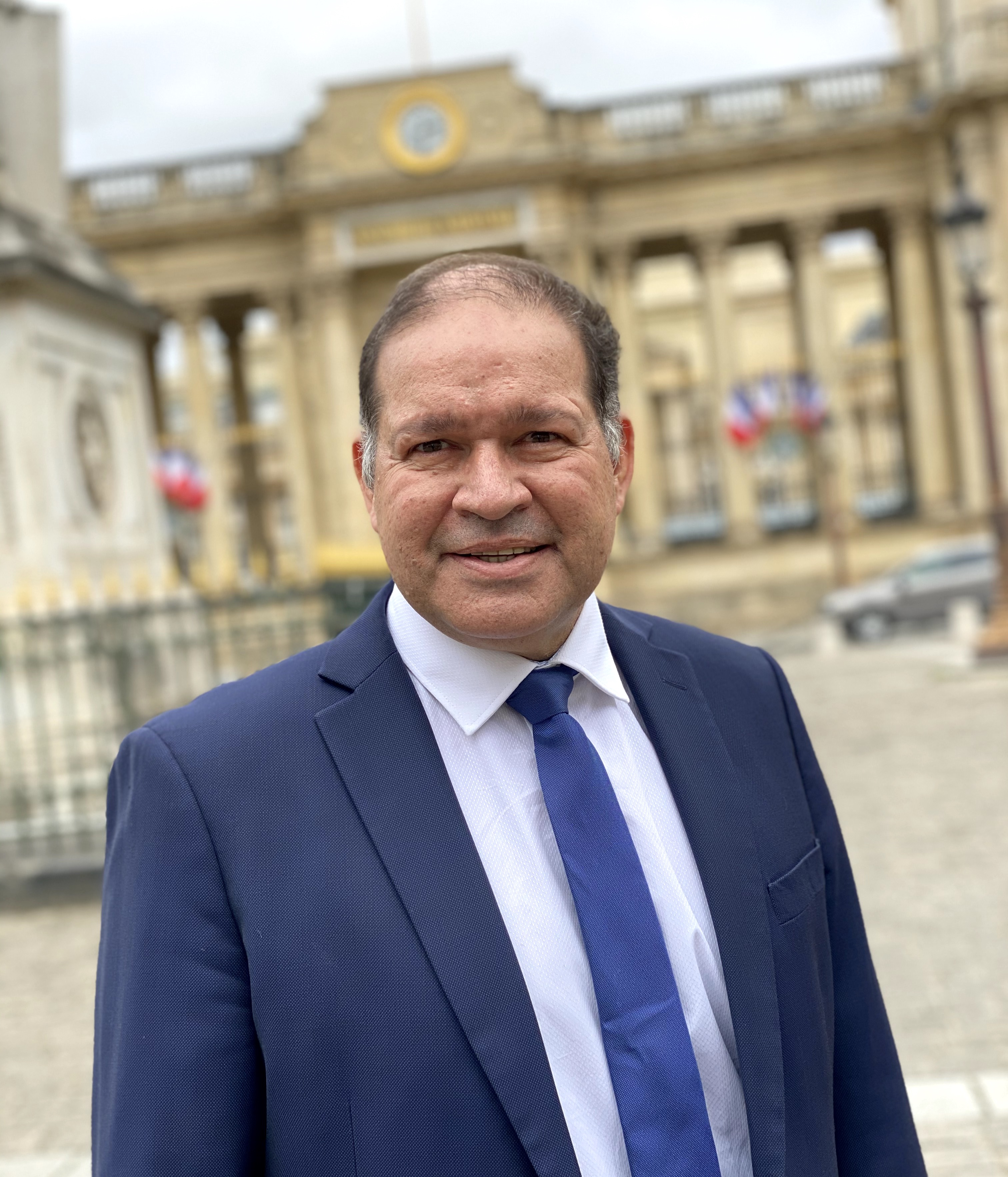

Member of the French National Assembly for Réunion's 4th constituency
- In office 2017–2022
- Preceded by: Patrick Lebreton
- Succeeded by: Emeline K/Bidi

Personal details
- Born: 15 October 1964 (age 61) Saint-Pierre, Réunion
- Party: LR

David Lorion (born 15 October 1964) is a French politician of Republicans (LR) who served as a member of the National Assembly from 2017 until 2022, representing Réunion's 4th constituency. On 19 June 2022, he lost in the second round to Emeline K/Bidi.
