= Martinique's 2nd constituency =

Constituency of French parliament

2nd constituency of Martinique
- inline Constituency of the National Assembly of France

- Map of Martinique constituencies
- Deputy: Marcellin Nadeau; Péyi-A
- Department: Martinique
- Cantons: L'Ajoupa-Bouillon, Basse-Pointe, Case-Pilote, Le Carbet, Le Lorrain, Macouba, Le Marigot, Le Morne-Rouge, Le Prêcheur, Grand-Rivière, Morne Vert, Bellefontaine, Saint-Pierre, Saint-Joseph, Schœlcher-1, Schœlcher-2, Sainte-Marie-1, Sainte-Marie-2
- Registered voters: 79,665

The 2nd constituency of Martinique is a French legislative constituency in the Martinique département. It elects one deputy to the French national assembly.

== Deputies ==
Election	Member	Party
1988	Maurice Louis-Joseph-Dogué	PS
1993	Pierre Petit	RPR
1997	Pierre Petit	RPR
2002	Alfred Almont	UMP
2007	Alfred Almont	UMP
2012	Bruno Nestor Azerot	DVG
2017	Bruno Nestor Azerot	DVG
2018	Manuéla Kéclard-Mondésir	DVG
2022	Marcellin Nadeau	Péyi-A
2024	Marcellin Nadeau	Péyi-A

== Election results ==
=== 2024 ===
Candidate	Party	Alliance	First round		Second round	
Candidate	Party	Alliance	Votes	%	Votes	%
Marcellin Nadeau	Péyi-A	NFP	12,017	48.31	17,230	65.68
Yan Monplaisir	DVD		6,732	27.06	9,003	34.32
Juvénal Remir	RN		2,614	10.51		
Christian Rapha	DVD		1,888	7.59		
Alexandre Ventadour	DIV		1,626	6.54		
Valid votes			24,877	100.00	26,233	100.00
Blank votes			778	2.98	812	2.93
Null votes			641	2.44	672	2.42
Turnout			26,296	33.00	27,717	34.79
Abstentions			53,379	67.00	51,948	65.21
Registered voters			79,675		79,665	
Result			Péyi-A HOLD			

=== 2022 ===
Legislative Election 2022: Martinique's 2nd constituency
Party	Candidate	Votes	%	±%
Péyi-A	Marcellin Nadeau	4,436	27.56	+16.21
MIM	Justin Pamphile	4,160	25.84	+3.71
PPM	Jean-Baptiste Joseph Rotsen	3,130	19.44	N/A
LFI	Karine Varasse	2,127	13.21	+9.20
DVG	Barbara Jean-Élie	721	4.48	N/A
RN	Max Ferraty	598	3.71	+2.80
Others	N/A	925	5.75	−
Turnout		16,097	21.50	−6.92
2nd round result
Péyi-A	Marcellin Nadeau	12,764	63.46	N/A
MIM	Justin Pamphile	7,348	36.54	−7.68
Turnout		20,112	26.87	−1.55
Péyi-A gain from DVG				

=== 2017 ===
Candidate	Label	First round		Second round	
Candidate	Label	Votes	%	Votes	%
Bruno Nestor Azerot	DVG	7,132	32.70	14,110	55.78
Justin Pamphile	DVG	4,826	22.13	11,185	44.22
Yan Monplaisir	LR	4,458	20.44		
Marcellin Nadeau	REG	2,475	11.35		
Louis Boutrin	ECO	1,218	5.59		
Karine Varasse	FI	874	4.01		
Alex Dufeal	EXG	328	1.50		
Aurélie Le Gourlay	FN	199	0.91		
Katiucia Cantinol	UDI	138	0.63		
Ludovic Minar	DIV	98	0.45		
Élisabeth Bailly	DIV	62	0.28		
Votes		21,808	100.00	25,295	100.00
Valid votes		21,808	93.96	25,295	90.99
Blank votes		767	3.30	1,388	4.99
Null votes		635	2.74	1,117	4.02
Turnout		23,210	28.42	27,800	34.04
Abstentions		58,461	71.58	53,867	65.96
Registered voters		81,671		81,667	
Source: Ministry of the Interior

Miscellaneous Left hold

=== 2012 ===
2012 legislative election in Martinique's 2nd constituency
Candidate	Party	First round		Second round	
Candidate	Party	Votes	%	Votes	%
Bruno Nestor Azerot	RDM	5,742	21.60%	16,812	55.47%
Luc-Louison Clémenté	DVG	5,558	20.91%	13,496	44.53%
Yan Monplaisir	UMP	5,387	20.27%		
Jenny Dulys-Petit		3,117	11.73%		
Marcellin Nadeau	EELV	2,871	10.80%		
Félix Ismain	PPM	1,407	5.29%		
Christian Rapha	PRM	728	2.74%		
Frantz Lebon	PS	577	2.17%		
Olivier-Ernest Jean-Marie		303	1.14%		
Max Orville	MoDem	292	1.10%		
Janine Maurice-Bellay	EELV	263	0.99%		
Stéphanie De Gonneville	FN	182	0.68%		
Alex Dufeal	Combat ouvrier	154	0.58%		
Valid votes		26,581	93.62%	30,308	92.16%
Spoilt and null votes		1,811	6.38%	2,579	7.84%
Votes cast / turnout		28,392	34.75%	32,887	40.26%
Abstentions		53,307	65.25%	48,806	59.74%
Registered voters		81,699	100.00%	81,693	100.00%

== Sources and references ==
- French Interior Ministry results website: "Résultats électoraux officiels en France" (in French).
- "Résultats électoraux officiels en France" (in French). 2017.
