= Bruno Nestor Azerot =

French politician

Member of the French National Assembly for Martinique's 2nd constituency
- In office 2012–2018
- Succeeded by: Manuéla Kéclard-Mondésir

Personal details
- Born: 22 July 1961 (age 64); La Trinité, Martinique

Bruno Nestor Azerot (born 22 July 1961 in La Trinité, Martinique) is a French politician who served as a member of the French National Assembly from 20 June 2012 to 23 April 2018, representing Martinique's 2nd constituency.
