= Patrice Calméjane =

French politician

Mayor of Villemomble
- In office 19 March 2001 – 12 September 2019
- Preceded by: Robert Calméjane
- Succeeded by: Pierre-Étienne Mage

Member of the National Assembly for Seine-Saint-Denis's 8th constituency
- In office 20 June 2007 – 20 June 2012
- Preceded by: Robert Pandraud
- Succeeded by: Élisabeth Pochon

Personal details
- Born: 6 February 1960 (age 66) Montreuil, France
- Party: The Republicans

Patrice Calméjane (born 6 February 1960 in Montreuil, Seine-Saint-Denis) was a member of the National Assembly of France from 2007 to 2012. He represented the Seine-Saint-Denis department, and is a member of the Union for a Popular Movement.

He is also the mayor of the town of Villemomble in the department of Seine-Saint-Denis between 2001 and 2019.
