= Josette Pons =

French politician

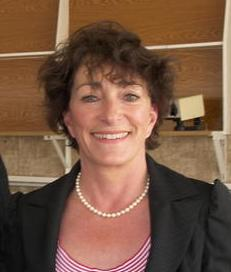

Member of the National Assembly of France
- In office 19 June 2002 – 20 June 2017
- Preceded by: Maurice Janetti
- Succeeded by: Valérie Gomez-Bassac
- Constituency: Var's 6th constituency

Mayor of Brignoles
- In office 4 April 2014 – July 2017
- Preceded by: Claude Gilardo
- Succeeded by: Didier Bremond

Personal details
- Born: December 12, 1947 (age 78) Saint-Cyr-sur-Mer, France
- Party: Union for a Popular Movement; The Republicans

Josette Pons (born 12 December 1947) is a member of the National Assembly of France. She represents the Var department, and is a member of the Union for a Popular Movement.

She was elected deputy on 16 June 2002 of the 12th Legislature of the Fifth French Republic (2002–2007). The legislative elections of 10 June 2007 and 17 June 2012 renewed her appointment.

In November 2016 French fiscal regulators responsible for combatting elected official corruption found her guilty of underestimating her wealth and income by over 2 million euros in her 2014 tax returns. As a result, she was fined 45,000 euros and was heavily criticized in French media.
