= K with stroke =

Letter of the Latin alphabet

Latin letter K with stroke

K with stroke (Ꝁ, ꝁ) is a letter of the Latin alphabet, derived from K with the addition of a bar through the letter.

It was used in Latin as an abbreviation for words that start with k. In Old Norse it was used for "konungr" (king) or to abbreviate the word "skulu" (shall) to "sꝁ".

It was also found in Latin alphabets of languages in the Soviet Union.

== Computer encodings ==
Capital and small K with stroke is encoded in Unicode as of version 5.1, at codepoints U+A740 and U+A741.

== See also ==
- Ҟ ҟ: Ka with stroke
