= Emeline K/Bidi =

French lawyer and politician (born 1987)

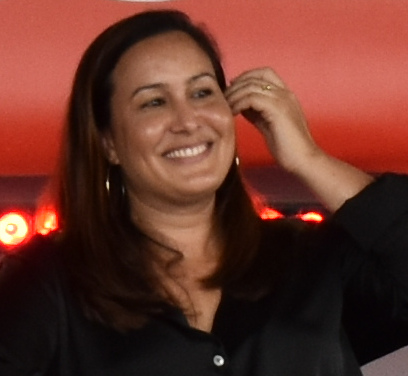
- K/Bidi at the Fête de l'Humanité in 2023

Co-President of the GDR Group
- Incumbent
- Assumed office 1 April 2025 Serving with Stéphane Peu
- Preceded by: André Chassaigne

Deputy of the French National Assembly for Réunion's 4th constituency
- Incumbent
- Assumed office 22 June 2022
- Preceded by: David Lorion

Deputy Mayor of Saint-Joseph
- In office March 2020 – June 2022

Personal details
- Born: 13 May 1987 (age 39) Saint-Denis, Réunion, France
- Party: Le Progrès
- Education: University of Réunion Island (LLM); École des Barreaux de Paris (CAPA)
- Profession: Lawyer

Emeline K/Bidi (French pronunciation: [kɛʁbidi]; born 13 May 1987) is a French lawyer and politician who has represented Réunion's 4th constituency in the National Assembly since 2022. A member of Le Progrès, she sits with the Gauche démocrate et républicaine (GDR) parliamentary group and became its co-president on 1 April 2025, alongside Stéphane Peu. Before entering Parliament, she served as deputy mayor of Saint-Joseph, with responsibility for planning and human resources. K/Bidi is one of three deputies from La Réunion in the GDR group, which comprises Communist and overseas elected officials. Her legislative work focuses on issues affecting France's overseas territories, particularly banking fees, housing costs, and territorial equality. In June 2025, she announced her candidacy for mayor of Saint-Pierre in the 2026 municipal elections.

== Early life and education ==
Emeline K/Bidi was born on 13 May 1987 in Saint-Denis, Réunion. Her father was a schoolteacher (instituteur) and her mother a cleaning woman (femme de ménage). Her family name is of Breton origin; her ancestor relocated from Quimperlé in Brittany to Réunion in the 18th century. The letter Ꝃ (K with stroke; French: k barré) was used in Breton as an abbreviation for the prefix Ker, meaning "village" or "hamlet". She completed her secondary education at Lycée Pierre Poivre in Saint-Joseph, obtaining her baccalauréat in 2005. She pursued her legal studies entirely at the University of Reunion Island in Le Tampon, earning a licence in law (2007–2008), a Master 1 in Business Law as major of her class (2008–2009), and a Master 2 in Law and Litigation, also as major (2009–2010). She won the University of Réunion's thesis competition in 2009–2010. K/Bidi passed the entrance examination to the Regional Training Center for the Legal Profession (CRFPA) of Réunion in 2008–2009 and obtained her law degree from the Paris Bar School in 2012.

== Legal career ==
K/Bidi was sworn in at the high court of Saint-Denis on 5 April 2013, where she worked as an associate lawyer with Maître Jean-Jacques Morel until 2019. In May 2019, she was called to the bar at Saint-Pierre, where she established her own practice in Saint-Joseph. She maintained her law practice as an individual entrepreneur until July 2024.

== Municipal career ==
K/Bidi entered politics in March 2020, when she was elected to the municipal council of Saint-Joseph on the list led by Patrick Lebreton. She was appointed sixth deputy mayor (6ème adjointe), with responsibility for planning (aménagement) and human resources. She gained public prominence in early 2022 when she served as the municipal spokesperson during the passage of Cyclone Batsirai and Cyclone Emnati, providing regular updates on cyclone damage in Saint-Joseph. She resigned from her municipal positions in June 2022 following her election to the National Assembly, in accordance with France's conflict of interest laws.

== National Assembly career ==
=== First term (2022–2024) ===
In the 2022 French legislative election, K/Bidi ran to represent Réunion's 4th constituency—comprising Saint-Pierre, Saint-Joseph, and Petite-Île—as the candidate of Le Progrès, supported by Patrick Lebreton and regional councillor Wilfrid Bertile. She faced incumbent David Lorion of Les Républicains, who had held the seat since 2017. In the second round on 19 June 2022, K/Bidi defeated Lorion with 61% of the vote, marking a significant shift in a constituency that had previously voted for the right. She joined the Gauche démocrate et républicaine (GDR) parliamentary group and was assigned to the Commission des Lois (Committee on Constitutional Laws, Legislation, and General Administration). She also served on the Délégation aux outre-mer (Delegation to Overseas Territories) and briefly on the study group on prostitution.

=== Second term (2024–present) ===
Following President Emmanuel Macron's dissolution of the National Assembly in June 2024, K/Bidi stood for re-election under the New Popular Front banner. In the first round on 30 June 2024, she won 42.3% of votes, ahead of National Rally candidate Jonathan Rivière (27.6%) and Lorion (24.6%). In the second round on 7 July 2024, she defeated Rivière with 60.6% of votes, winning decisively in all three communes: Saint-Pierre (60.3%), Petite-Île (52.5%), and Saint-Joseph (63.4%). She was re-assigned to the Commission des Lois.

=== Co-presidency of the GDR group ===
On 1 April 2025, following André Chassaigne's election as deputy mayor in Puy-de-Dôme and his subsequent departure from the Assembly, K/Bidi was elected co-president of the GDR group alongside Stéphane Peu, deputy for Seine-Saint-Denis. The GDR group comprises 17 deputies, with roughly equal representation between Communist Party members and deputies from overseas territories. As co-president, she has led the group's opposition to successive governments. In September 2025, she stated: "We are not responsible for the situation...This is what the French people are demanding—the resignation of the President of the Republic!"

== Legislative work ==
K/Bidi's parliamentary activity has focused on issues affecting La Réunion and France's overseas territories. According to Datan, she has participated in 82% of solemn votes since taking office in July 2024, voting in alignment with her GDR group 94% of the time. On 5 June 2025, during the GDR's parliamentary initiative day, K/Bidi presented a legislative proposal to reform the Allocation de solidarité aux personnes âgées (ASPA), France's old-age solidarity allowance. Her proposal would exclude the value of a person's primary residence from succession repayment calculations, addressing the high non-take-up rate among elderly people in La Réunion who fear their heirs will be forced to sell the family home. She has also advocated for capping or eliminating excessive banking fees in overseas territories, which disproportionately affect low-income households.

== Political positions ==
K/Bidi voted in favour of inscribing abortion rights (IVG) in the Constitution. She voted against the 2023 immigration law and against the National Rally's proposal to denounce the 1968 Franco-Algerian accords. She voted in favour of the proposition de loi creating a right to assisted dying in May 2025. She supported the November 2025 parliamentary vote to suspend the pension reform law, which was adopted by 255 votes to 146.

== 2026 mayoral candidacy ==
On 1 June 2025, K/Bidi announced her candidacy for mayor of Saint-Pierre in the March 2026 municipal elections. She will face incumbent mayor David Lorion, her opponent in both the 2022 and 2024 legislative elections. At her campaign launch, attended by fellow GDR deputies Frédéric Maillot and Karine Lebon, K/Bidi stated: "My motivation comes from the field, from the call I have received since 2022, from this desire of the population to see change...I want to break with the old clientelist system."
