= Réunion's 4th constituency =

Constituency of the French Fifth Republic

4th constituency of Réunion
- inline Constituency of the National Assembly of France

- The constituency in Réunion
- Deputy: Emeline K/Bidi; Le Progrès
- Department: Réunion

The 4th constituency of Réunion is a French legislative constituency on the island of Réunion.

As of 2024, it is represented by Emeline K/Bidi, a Le Progrès deputy.

== Deputies ==
Election	Member	Party
2007	Patrick Lebreton	PS
2012	Patrick Lebreton	PS
2017	David Lorion	LR
2022	Emeline K/Bidi	Le Progrès
2024	Emeline K/Bidi	Le Progrès

== Election results ==
=== 2024 ===
Candidate	Party	Alliance	First round		Second round	
Candidate	Party	Alliance	Votes	%	Votes	%
Emeline K/Bidi	Le Progrès	NFP	22,696	42.28	32,405	60.59
Jonathan Rivière	RN		14,797	27.57	21,075	39.41
David Lorion	DVD		13,171	24.54		
Imrhane Moullan	DVD		1,594	2.97		
Serge Latchoumanin	LO		1,189	2.21		
Martine Dijoux	DSV		233	0.43		
Valid votes			53,680	100.00	53,480	100.00
Blank votes			1,577	2.77	2,359	4.06
Null votes			1,718	3.02	2,286	3.93
Turnout			56,975	51.11	58,125	52.13
Abstentions			54,508	48.89	53,375	47.87
Registered voters			111,483		111,500	
Result			LE PROGRÈS HOLD			

=== 2022 ===
Candidate	Label	First round		Second round	
Candidate	Label	Votes	%	Votes	%
Emeline K/Bidi	Le Progrès (NUPES)	13,197	36.11	27,532	61.33
David Lorion	LR (UDC)	11,868	32.48	17,363	38.67
Annie-Claude Boucher	RN	3,850	10.54		
Ruth Dijoux	ECO	2,118	5.80		
Stéphane Albora	ECO	1,819	4.98		
Sharif Bemat	LREM (ENS)	1,326	3.63		
Patricia Hoareau	LP (UPF)	927	2.54		
Richard Riani	DIV	527	1.44		
Serge Latchoumanin	LO	417	1.14		
Rudy Thazard	REG	335	0.92		
Isabelle Payet	DIV	158	0.43		
Votes		36,542	100.00	44,895	100.00
Valid votes		36,542	92.77	44,895	93.28
Blank votes		1,331	3.38	1,395	2.90
Null votes		1,517	3.85	1,839	3.82
Turnout		39,390	36.16	48,129	44.18
Abstentions		69,541	63.84	60,812	55.82
Registered voters		108,931		108,941	
Source: Ministry of the Interior

=== 2017 ===
Candidate	Label	First round		Second round	
Candidate	Label	Votes	%	Votes	%
David Lorion	LR	13,272	33.22	23,540	54.39
Virginie Gobalou	DVG	9,441	23.63	19,738	45.61
Anaïs Patel	REM	5,416	13.56		
Corine Bédier	FI	3,328	8.33		
Philippe Ghanty	FN	2,567	6.43		
Bernard Von-Pine	DVD	1,590	3.98		
Hermann Rifosta	DVD	1,152	2.88		
Danon Lutchmee Odayen	ECO	1,030	2.58		
Maximin Banon	DVG	921	2.31		
Jean-François Sarpedon	ECO	461	1.15		
Sophie Sénac	DIV	459	1.15		
Serge Latchoumanin	EXG	315	0.79		
Votes		39,952	100.00	43,278	100.00
Valid votes		39,952	91.21	43,278	87.71
Blank votes		1,708	3.90	2,631	5.33
Null votes		2,141	4.89	3,434	6.96
Turnout		43,801	41.72	49,343	47.01
Abstentions		61,187	58.28	55,627	52.99
Registered voters		104,988		104,970	
Source: Ministry of the Interior

=== 2012 ===
2012 legislative election in La-Reunion's 4th constituency
Candidate	Party	First round	
Candidate	Party	Votes	%
Patrick Lebreton	PS	24,337	51.13%
Béatrice Sigismeau	UMP	11,060	23.24%
Elie Hoarau	PCR	7,365	15.47%
Marie-Luce Clain	FN	1,428	3.00%
Bertrand Grondin	EELV	1,074	2.26%
Jean Le Porchou	FG	590	1.24%
Valérie Dambreville	DLR	537	1.13%
Jean-François Sarpedon		529	1.11%
Yanis Payet		482	1.01%
Serge Latchoumanin	LO	193	0.41%
Valid votes		47,595	95.45%
Spoilt and null votes		2,269	4.55%
Votes cast / turnout		49,864	52.56%
Abstentions		45,008	47.44%
Registered voters		94,872	100.00%

== Sources ==
- French Interior Ministry results website: "Résultats électoraux officiels en France" (in French).
