= Le Progrès (Réunion) =

- Founded: 2013
- Split from: Socialist Party
- Headquarters: Réunion
- Ideology: Socialism
- Colors: Pink

Le Progrès (French pronunciation: [lə pʁɔɡʁɛ]), previously Mouvement Le Progrès then Progrès 974, is a political party in Réunion founded in 2013, by dissidents from the local federation of the Socialist Party.

== History ==
The party contested the 2022 French legislative election as part of NUPES. Emeline K/Bidi was elected the party's only Member of Parliament. She was re-elected in 2024.

== Electoral history ==
Year	1st round		Rank (by number of votes)	2nd round		Rank (by number of votes)	Seats	Government
Year	Votes	%	Rank (by number of votes)	Votes	%	Rank (by number of votes)	Seats	Government
2022	13,197	6.81	7th	27,532	12.93	3rd	1/7	Opposition
2024	22,696	7.59	4th	32,405	10.50	4th	1/7	Opposition

== See also ==
- List of political parties in Réunion
