= Marion Lenne =

French politician (born 1974)

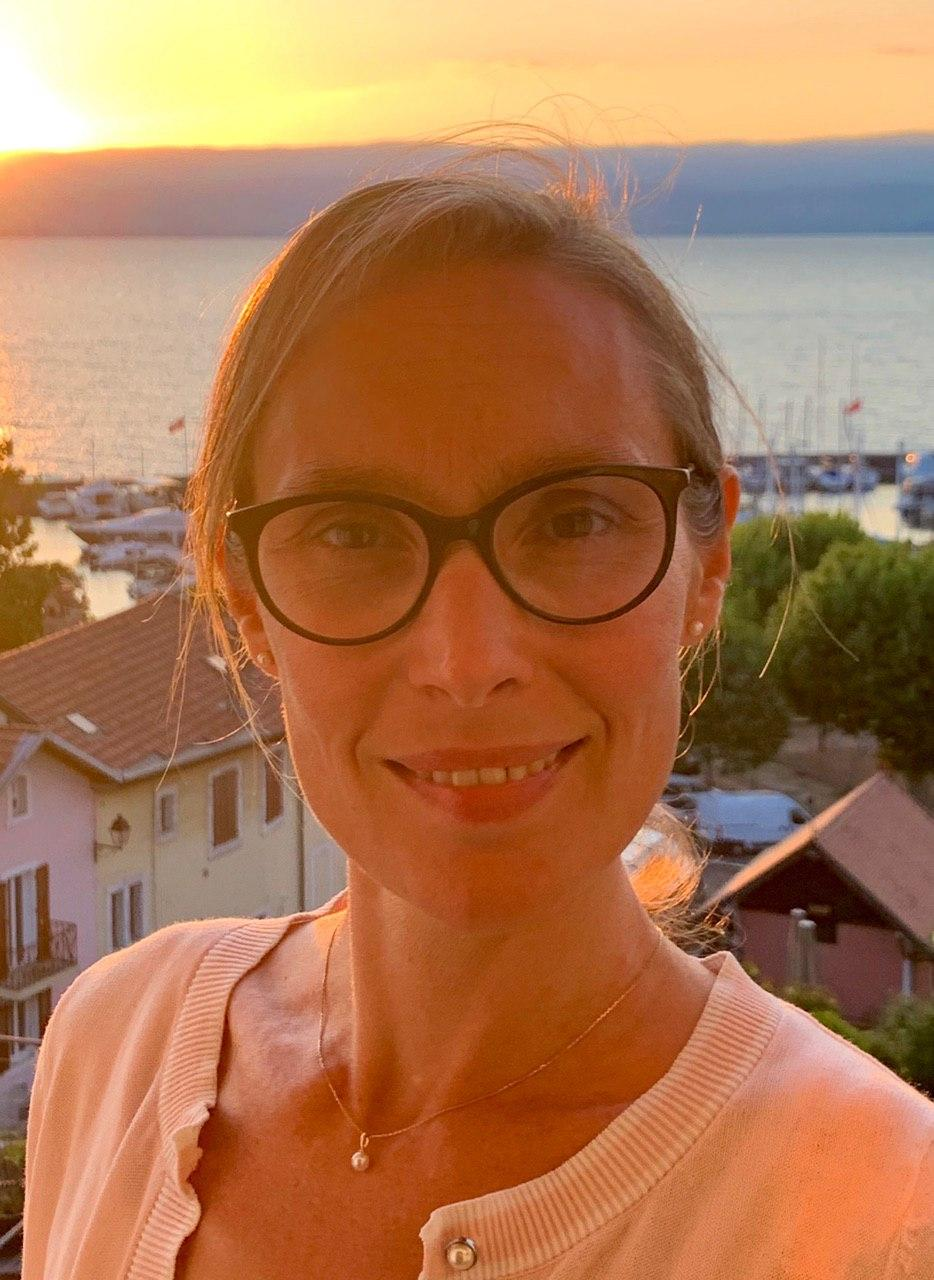
- Lenne in 2020

Member of the National Assembly for Haute-Savoie's 5th constituency
- In office 21 June 2017 – 21 June 2022
- Preceded by: Marc Francina
- Succeeded by: Anne-Cécile Violland

Personal details
- Born: 20 November 1974 (age 51) Gardanne, France
- Party: La République En Marche! (2017–2019)
- Other political affiliations: Union of Democrats and Independents (formerly)

Marion Lenne (French pronunciation: [maʁjɔ̃ lɛn]; born 20 November 1974) is a French politician who represented the 5th constituency of the Haute-Savoie department in the National Assembly from 2017 to 2022. She previously served as a municipal councillor of Thonon-les-Bains from 2014 to 2017 for the Union of Democrats and Independents (UDI), which she left prior to joining La République En Marche! (LREM), which she left in turn in 2019, while remaining in its parliamentary group.

In 2020, Lenne joined En Commun (EC), a group within LREM led by Barbara Pompili. In the 2022 legislative election, Lenne stood down. Her constituency was won by Anne-Cécile Violland of Horizons.

== Political positions ==
In July 2019, Lenne decided not to align with her parliamentary group's majority and became one of 52 LREM members who abstained from a vote on the French ratification of the European Union's Comprehensive Economic and Trade Agreement (CETA) with Canada.

== See also ==
- 2017 French legislative election
