= Haute-Savoie's 5th constituency =

Constituency of the National Assembly of France

5th constituency of Haute-Savoie
- inline Constituency of the National Assembly of France

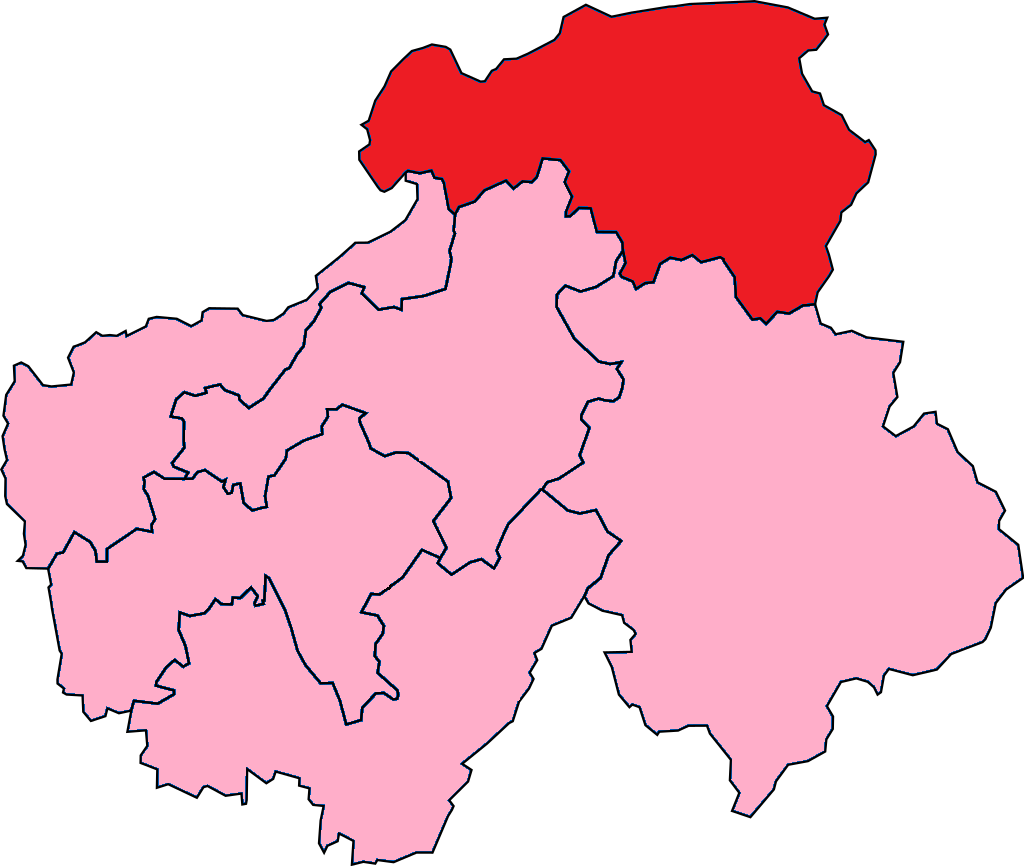
- Haute-Savoie's 5th Constituency shown within Haute-Savoie
- Deputy: Anne-Cécile Violland; Horizons
- Department: Haute-Savoie
- Cantons: Abondance, Le Biot, Douvaine, Evian-les-Bains, Thonon-les-Bains Est, Thonon-les-Bains Ouest
- Registered voters: 95600

The 5th constituency of the Haute-Savoie (French: Cinquième circonscription de la Haute-Savoie) is a French legislative constituency in the Haute-Savoie département. Like the other 576 French constituencies, it elects one MP using a two round electoral system.

== Description ==
The 5th constituency of Haute-Savoie covers the north east of the department including Thonon-les-Bains on the banks of Lake Geneva.

The seat has historically supported centre right candidates, however in 2017 the seat along with three others in the department fell to Emmanuel Macron's En Marche! party with the LR coming third in the first round.

== Assembly members ==
Election	Member	Party
1988	Pierre Mazeaud	RPR
1998	Jean-Marc Chavanne	RPR
2002	Jean-Marc Chavanne	UMP
2003	Marc Francina	UMP
2017	Marion Lenne	LREM
2022	Anne-Cécile Violland	Horizons
2024	Anne-Cécile Violland	Horizons

== Election results ==
=== 2024 ===
Legislative Election 2024: Haute-Savoie's 5th constituency
Party	Candidate	Votes	%	±%
HOR (Ensemble)	Anne-Cécile Violland	21,124	31.08	+3.02
LO	Michelle Bally	484	0.71	n/a
LR (UXD)	Quentin Taïeb	21,822	32.10	+16.00
PS (NFP)	Jean-Baptiste Baud	15,985	23.52	n/a
DIV	Daniel Magnin	1,808	2.66	−0.43
DIV	Nicolas Bal	987	1.45	n/a
DVD	Chrystelle Beurrier	4,800	7.06	n/a
REC	Sacha Poidevin	963	1.42	−3.36
Turnout		67,973	97.70	+53.81
Registered electors		103,704		
2nd round result
HOR	Anne-Cécile Violland	41,609	62.13	−2.04
LR	Quentin Taïeb	25,359	37.87	n/a
Turnout		66,968	95.81	
Registered electors		+ 53.42		
HOR hold		Swing		

=== 2022 ===
Legislative Election 2022: Haute-Savoie's 5th constituency
Party	Candidate	Votes	%	±%
HOR (Ensemble)	Anne-Cécile Violland	12,323	28.06	-8.16
LFI (NUPÉS)	Odile Martin-Cocher	9,600	21.86	+4.96
RN	Jessica Terreni	7,070	16.10	+7.48
LR (UDC)	Sophie Dion	5,124	11.67	−0.77
DVD	Guillaume Ducrot*	2,257	5.14	N/A
REC	Céline Vico	2,098	4.78	N/A
DVE	Quentin Duvocelle	1,818	4.14	N/A
REG	Barbara Lemmo Gaud	1,358	3.09	−4.75
Others	N/A	2,261	-	−
Turnout		43,909	43.89	+0.18
2nd round result
HOR (Ensemble)	Anne-Cécile Violland	23,873	60.09	+6.43
LFI (NUPÉS)	Odile Martin-Cocher	15,858	39.91	N/A
Turnout		39,731	42.39	+7.67
HOR gain from LREM				

* Ducrot ran as a dissident member of LR, who supported Dion's candidacy.

=== 2017 ===
Legislative Election 2017: Haute-Savoie's 5th constituency
Party	Candidate	Votes	%	±%
LREM	Marion Lenne	15,134	36.22	
DVD	Astrid Baud-Roche	6,054	14.49	
LR	Patricia Mahut	5,200	12.44	
FN	Anne-Francoise Abadie Parisi	3,602	8.62	
LFI	Marin Dauriat	3,593	8.60	
REG	Daniel Magnin (100% Savoie)	3,277	7.84	
PS	Jean-Baptiste Baud	2,210	5.29	
PCF	Gil Thomas	1,259	3.01	
Others	N/A	1,457		
Turnout		41,786	43.71	
2nd round result
LREM	Marion Lenne	17,814	53.66	
DVD	Astrid Baud-Roche	15,381	46.34	
Turnout		33,195	34.72	
LREM gain from LR				

=== 2012 ===
Legislative Election 2012: Haute-Savoie's 5th constituency
Party	Candidate	Votes	%	±%
PS	Pascale Escoubes	13,772	28.66	
UMP	Marc Francina	13,772	28.66	
DVD	Astrid Baud-Roche	7,226	15.04	
FN	Patrick Chevallay	5,532	11.51	
DIV	Jean-Christophe Bernaz	2,688	5.59	
FG	Odile Rouffignac	1,673	3.48	
EELV	Emilie Delbays-Atge	1,355	2.82	
Others	N/A	2,027		
Turnout		48,045	53.44	
2nd round result
UMP	Marc Francina	22,914	51.97	
PS	Pascale Escoubes	21,173	48.03	
Turnout		44,087	49.04	
UMP hold				

=== 2007 ===
Legislative Election 2007: Haute-Savoie's 5th constituency
Party	Candidate	Votes	%	±%
UMP	Marc Francina	28,175	49.28	
PS	Clotilde Verguet	9,612	16.81	
MoDem	Bernar Bouvier	9,279	16.23	
FN	Christelle Thabuis	2,237	3.91	
LV	Josiane Scheppler	2,006	3.51	
PCF	Hervé Dufresne	1,221	2.14	
Others	N/A	4,147		
Turnout		58,237	54.58	
2nd round result
UMP	Marc Francina	33,210	63.59	
PS	Clotilde Verguet	19,019	36.41	
Turnout		54,059	50.66	
UMP hold				

=== 2002 ===
Legislative Election 2002: Haute-Savoie's 5th constituency
Party	Candidate	Votes	%	±%
UMP	Jean-Marc Chavanne	19,945	35.13	
PS	Frédéric Zory	13,754	24.23	
DVD	Jean Denais	9,833	17.32	
FN	Martine Chatel	6,415	11.30	
REG	Pierre Mudry	1,427	2.51	
PCF	Brigitte Bapt-Dufresne	1,167	2.06	
Others	N/A	4,228		
Turnout		57,842	60.63	
2nd round result
UMP	Jean-Marc Chavanne	30,580	62.10	
PS	Frédéric Zory	18,660	37.90	
Turnout		49,240	53.27	
UMP hold				

=== 1997 ===
Legislative Election 1997: Haute-Savoie's 5th constituency
Party	Candidate	Votes	%	±%
RPR	Pierre Mazeaud	15,755	31.96	
PS	Bernard Comont	9,372	19.01	
FN	Maurice Guillon	7,007	14.21	
DVD	Michel Vivien	5,482	11.12	
PCF	Bernard Neplaz	4,920	9.98	
LV	Alain Coulombel	2,490	5.05	
GE	Jacqueline Denne	2,204	4.47	
LDI	Pierre Meyer	2,069	4.20	
Turnout		54,156	63.01	
2nd round result
RPR	Pierre Mazeaud	28,533	55.40	
PS	Bernard Comont	22,971	44.60	
Turnout		56,302	65.52	
RPR hold				
