= François Goulard =

French politician

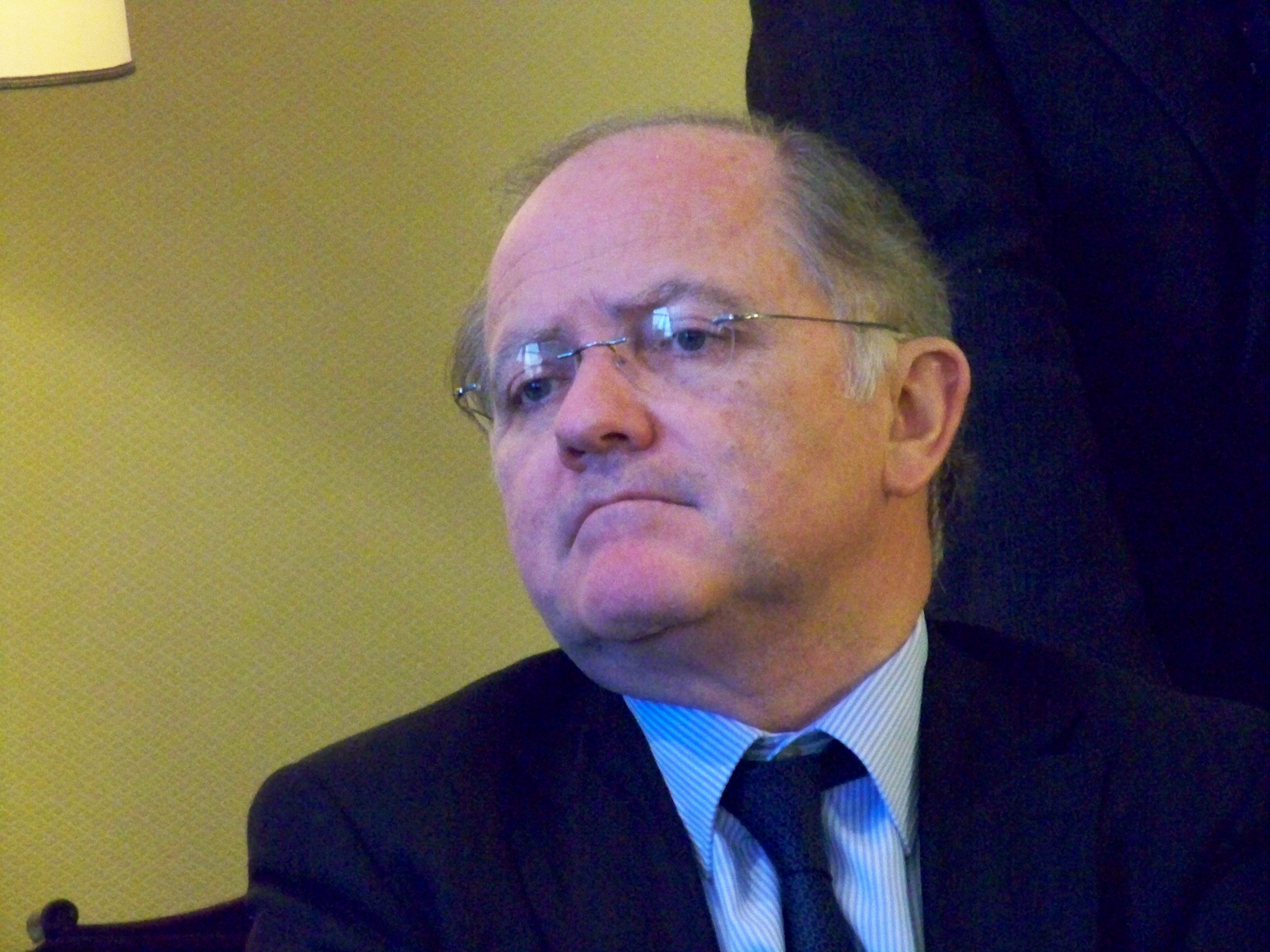

French Minister of Higher Education
- In office 2005–2007
- President: Jacques Chirac
- Prime Minister: Dominique de Villepin
- Preceded by: François d'Aubert
- Succeeded by: Valérie Pécresse

Deputy for Morbihan's 1st constituency in the National Assembly of France
- In office 1997–2004
- Preceded by: Raymond Marcellin
- Succeeded by: Josiane Boyce
- In office 2007–2012
- Preceded by: Josiane Boyce
- Succeeded by: Hervé Pellois

Personal details
- Born: 21 September 1953 (age 73) Vannes, Brittany, France
- Party: UMP
- Education: École Centrale Paris, Sciences Po, ÉNA

François Goulard (French pronunciation: [fʁɑ̃swa gulaʁ]; born 21 September 1953 in Vannes) was a member of the National Assembly of France. He represented the Morbihan department, and is a member of the Union for a Popular Movement. He has been appointed as minister of transports from 2004 to 2005 and minister of superior education from 2005 to 2007.

In November 2021, he became treasurer of Horizons, a party within President Emmanuel Macron's Ensemble Citoyens coalition.
