= Marne's 1st constituency =

Constituency of the National Assembly of France

1st constituency of Marne
- inline Constituency of the National Assembly of France

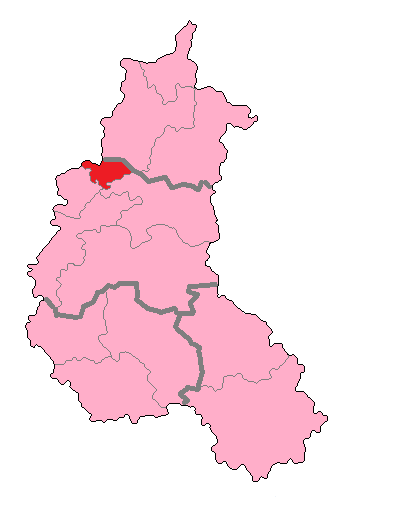
- The constituency shown within Champagne-Ardenne
- Incumbent deputy: Xavier Albertini; Horizons
- Department: Marne
- Cantons: Bourgogne, Reims II, Reims IV, Reims VI, Reims X
- Registered voters: 72,128 (2017)

The 1st constituency of Marne (French: Première circonscription de la Marne) is one of five electoral districts in the department of the same name, each of which returns one deputy to the French National Assembly in elections using the two-round system, with a run-off if no candidate receives more than 50% of the vote in the first round.

== Description ==
The constituency is made up of five (pre-2015) cantons: those of Bourgogne, Reims II, Reims IV, Reims VI, and Reims X.

It includes the northern part of Reims, the department's largest city, as well as some rural territory between it and the border with Ardennes.

At the time of the 1999 census (which was the basis for the most recent redrawing of constituency boundaries, carried out in 2010) the 1st constituency had a total population of 100,826.

The seat has been a conservative stronghold for many years and was held by Jean Falala, the long-serving mayor of Reims, until 2002 when he passed the seat on to his son Francis Falala. Francis, however, failed to match his father's longevity and lost the UMP nomination to Renaud Dutreil prior to the 2007 election, before standing as an independent and coming third in the first round of voting.

== Historic representation ==
Election	Member	Party
1986	Proportional representation – no election by constituency	
1988	Jean Falala	RPR
1993	Jean Falala	RPR
1997	Jean Falala	RPR
2002	Francis Falala	UMP
2007	Renaud Dutreil	UMP
2008	Arnaud Robinet	UMP
2012	Arnaud Robinet	UMP
2017	Valérie Beauvais	LR
2022	Xavier Albertini	HOR
2024	Xavier Albertini	HOR

== Election results ==
=== 2024 ===
Candidate	Party	Alliance	First round			Second round		
Candidate	Party	Alliance	Votes	%	+/–	Votes	%	+/–
Adrien Mexis	LR-RN	UXD	17,697	37.30	new	18,165	39.86	new
Xavier Albertini	HOR	Ensemble	16,058	33.84	+5.33	27,419	60.15	+4.24
Evelyne Bourgoin	LE	NFP	12,835	27.05	+2.86	withdrew		
Vincent Varlet	LO		856	1.80	+0.26			
Votes			47,446	100.00		45,584	100.00	
Valid votes			47,446	97.68	-0.89	45,584	94.76	+2.75
Blank votes			789	1.62	+0.57	1,963	4.08	-1.49
Null votes			340	0.70	+0.33	558	1.16	-1.26
Turnout			48,575	64.43	+20.85	48,105	63.79	+22.29
Abstentions			26,815	35.57	-20.85	27,309	36.21	-22.29
Registered voters			75,390			75,414		
Result			HOR HOLD					

=== 2022 ===
Legislative Election 2022: Marne's 1st constituency
Party	Candidate	Votes	%	±%
HOR (Ensemble)	Xavier Albertini	9,120	28.51	N/A
EELV (NUPÉS)	Evelyne Bourgoin	7,737	24.19	-2.83
RN	Roger Paris	6,485	20.28	+3.10
LR (UDC)	Valérie Beauvais	4,975	15.55	−12.02
REC	Florian Benadassi	1,389	4.34	N/A
DVE	Céline Brunhoso	843	2.64	+1.50
Others	N/A	1,435	-	−
Turnout		31,984	43.58	−1.56
2nd round result
HOR (Ensemble)	Xavier Albertini	15,897	55.91	N/A
EELV (NUPÉS)	Evelyne Bourgoin	12,536	44.09	N/A
Turnout		28,433	41.50	+4.31
HOR gain from LR				

=== 2017 ===
Candidate	Label	First round		Second round	
Candidate	Label	Votes	%	Votes	%
Gérard Chemla	DIV	9,071	28.30	10,573	44.66
Valérie Beauvais	LR	8,837	27.57	13,104	55.34
Sandrine Vignot	FN	5,507	17.18		
Laure Manesse	FI	3,745	11.69		
Alexandre Tunc	PS	2,045	6.38		
Marie-Ange Petit	ECO	1,054	3.29		
Anne-Sophie Frigout	DLF	618	1.93		
Céline Brunhoso-Goulden	ECO	364	1.14		
Vincent Varlet	EXG	321	1.00		
Guillaume Prin	DIV	220	0.69		
Quentin Czerwiec	DIV	207	0.65		
Mounir Bali	DIV	59	0.18		
Julien Maya-Pérez	DIV	0	0.00		
Votes		32,048	100.00	23,677	100.00
Valid votes		32,048	98.44	23,677	88.27
Blank votes		357	1.10	2,275	8.48
Null votes		150	0.46	872	3.25
Turnout		32,555	45.14	26,824	37.19
Abstentions		39,573	54.86	45,304	62.81
Registered voters		72,128		72,128	
Source: Ministry of the Interior

=== 2012 ===
Legislative Election 2012: Marne's 1st constituency
Party	Candidate	Votes	%	±%
UMP	Arnaud Robinet	13,941	38.54	
PS	Sabrina Ghallal	12,522	34.62	
FN	Thierry Besson	5,361	14.82	
FG	Cédric Lattuada	1,648	4.56	
EELV	Stéphane Joly	1,201	3.32	
Others	N/A	1,501		
Turnout		36,174	52.24	
2nd round result
UMP	Arnaud Robinet	18,515	52.77	
PS	Sabrina Ghallal	16,570	47.23	
Turnout		35,085	50.66	
UMP hold				

== Sources ==
Official results of French elections from 2002: "Résultats électoraux officiels en France" (in French).

Official results of French elections, Marne 1st, from 2017: "" (in French)
