= Sylvie Bouchet Bellecourt =

French politician (born 1957)

Member of the National Assembly for Seine-et-Marne's 2nd constituency
- In office 23 June 2020 – 21 June 2022
- Preceded by: Valérie Lacroutel
- Succeeded by: Frédéric Valletoux

Personal details
- Born: 3 July 1957 (age 68) Bondy, Seine-Saint-Denis, Île-de-France, France
- Party: Republican

Sylvie Bouchet Bellecourt (born 3 July 1957) is a French nurse and politician of the Republicans who became a member of the National Assembly since 2020, representing Seine-et-Marne's 2nd constituency. She did not seek re-election in the 2022 French legislative election.
