= Marne (department) =

Department of France

- Department
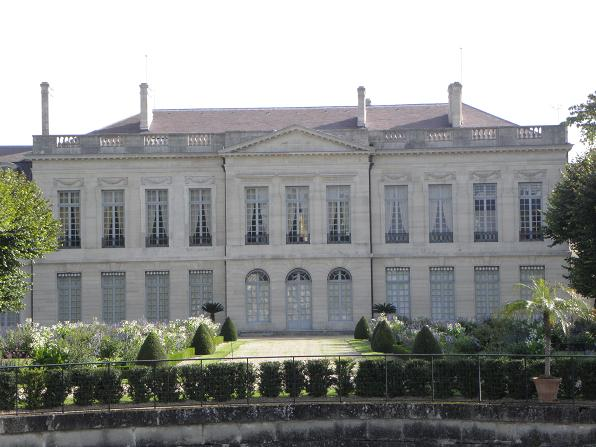
- Prefecture building of the Marne department, in Châlons-en-Champagne

- Flag Coat of arms

- Location of Marne in France
- Coordinates: 49°00′N 04°15′E
- Country: France
- Region: Grand Est
- Prefecture: Châlons-en-Champagne
- Subprefectures: Épernay; Reims; Vitry-le-François

Government
  - President of the Departmental Council: Jean-Marc Rose (DVD)

Area^{1}
  - Total: 8,162 km^{2} (3,151 sq mi)

Population (2023)
  - Total: 563,076
  - Rank: 45th
  - Density: 68.99/km^{2} (178.7/sq mi)
- Time zone: UTC+1 (CET)
  - Summer (DST): UTC+2 (CEST)
- ISO 3166 code: FR-51
- Department number: 51
- Arrondissements: 4
- Cantons: 23
- Communes: 610
- ^1 French Land Register data, which exclude estuaries and lakes, ponds and glaciers larger than 1 km^{2}

Marne (French pronunciation: [maʁn]) is a department in the Grand Est region of France. It is named after the river Marne which flows through it. Its prefecture (capital) is Châlons-en-Champagne (formerly Châlons-sur-Marne); its subprefectures are Épernay, Reims and Vitry-le-François. It had a population of 563,076 in 2023.

The Champagne vineyards producing the eponymous sparkling wine are in Marne.

== Name ==
The department is named after the Marne, which was called Matrona in Roman times.

== History ==
Marne is one of the original 83 departments created during the French Revolution on 4 March 1790. It was created from the province of Champagne.

Marne has a long association with the French Army. The training ground of the Camp Militaire de Mailly straddles the border with the département of Aube in the south while that of the Camp de Mourmelon occupies a large area north of Châlons-en-Champagne. The smaller Camp de Moronvilliers lies to the east of Reims and the Camp Militaire de Suippes lies to the east of that. These are all located on the chalk grounds of the Champagne plateau, a feature comparable in geology but not size, with the British military training ground on Salisbury Plain.

The Battles of the Marne, where the British and French fought against Germany during World War I, took place here.

== Geography ==
Marne is part of the region of Grand Est; until 31 December 2015 it was in the now-former Champagne-Ardenne. It is surrounded by the departments of Ardennes, Meuse, Haute-Marne, Aube, Seine-et-Marne and Aisne.

Geologically, it divides into two distinct parts; the Upper Cretaceous chalk plain in the east and the more wooded and hilly Eocene and Oligocene in the west.

Rivers draining the department include the Marne, Vesle, Ardre and Somme-Soude. Numerous other rivers, such as the Grande and the Petite Morin rise in the department but flow mainly in others. Conversely, the Aube joins the Seine in the department of Marne.

Marne is served by Champagne-Ardenne TGV station just outside Reims on the LGV Est.

=== Principal towns ===
The most populous commune in the department is Reims; the prefecture Châlons-en-Champagne is the second-most populous. As of 2023, there are five communes with more than 10,000 inhabitants:

Commune	Population (2023)
Reims	177,674
Châlons-en-Champagne	42,971
Épernay	22,174
Vitry-le-François	10,996
Tinqueux	10,771

== Demographics ==
The inhabitants of the department are called Marnais (masculine) and Marnaises (feminine) in French.

Population development since 1801:

Historical population

Year	Pop.	±% p.a.
1801	304,651	—
1806	311,017	+0.41%
1821	307,644	−0.07%
1831	337,076	+0.92%
1841	356,632	+0.57%
1851	373,302	+0.46%
1861	385,498	+0.32%
1872	386,157	+0.02%
1881	421,800	+0.99%
1891	434,734	+0.30%
1901	432,882	−0.04%
1911	436,310	+0.08%
1921	366,734	−1.72%
1931	412,156	+1.17%

Year	Pop.	±% p.a.
1936	410,238	−0.09%
1946	386,926	−0.58%
1954	415,141	+0.88%
1962	442,135	+0.79%
1968	485,302	+1.56%
1975	530,454	+1.28%
1982	543,670	+0.35%
1990	558,276	+0.33%
1999	565,284	+0.14%
2007	566,561	+0.03%
2012	568,795	+0.08%
2017	568,895	+0.00%
2023	563,076	−0.17%

== Politics ==
The president of the Departmental Council of Marne is Jean-Marc Rose (DVD), first elected in 2023.

=== Presidential elections (2nd round) results since 1988 ===
Election	Winning candidate	Party	%	2nd place candidate	Party	%
2022	Emmanuel Macron	LREM	52.10	Marine Le Pen	FN	47.90
2017	Emmanuel Macron	LREM	57.01	Marine Le Pen	FN	42.99
2012	Nicolas Sarkozy	UMP	55.31	François Hollande	PS	44.69
2007	Nicolas Sarkozy	UMP	59.20	Ségolène Royal	PS	40.80
2002	Jacques Chirac	RPR	79.83	Jean-Marie Le Pen	FN	20.17
1995	Jacques Chirac	RPR	54.53	Lionel Jospin	PS	45.47
1988	François Mitterrand	PS	53.87	Jacques Chirac	RPR	46.13

=== Representation in Paris ===
==== In the National Assembly ====
Constituency	Member	Party
Marne's 1st	Xavier Albertini	HOR
Marne's 2nd	Laure Miller	RE
Marne's 3rd	Maxime Michelet	UDR
Marne's 4th	Lise Magnier	HOR
Marne's 5th	Charles de Courson	LC

==== In the Senate ====
Senator	Party	Since
Christian Bruyen	DVD	2023
Anne-Sophie Romagny	UDI	2023
Cédric Chevalier	HOR	2023

== Tourism ==
Reims, with its cathedral in which the kings of France were traditionally crowned, is a major attraction. Others include the bird reserve on the Lake Der-Chantecoq and the fishing lakes nearby. The Parc Naturel Régional de la Montagne de Reims is a major area of country recreation. In the west of the département there are many scenic routes as also are the several wine cellars of Épernay.

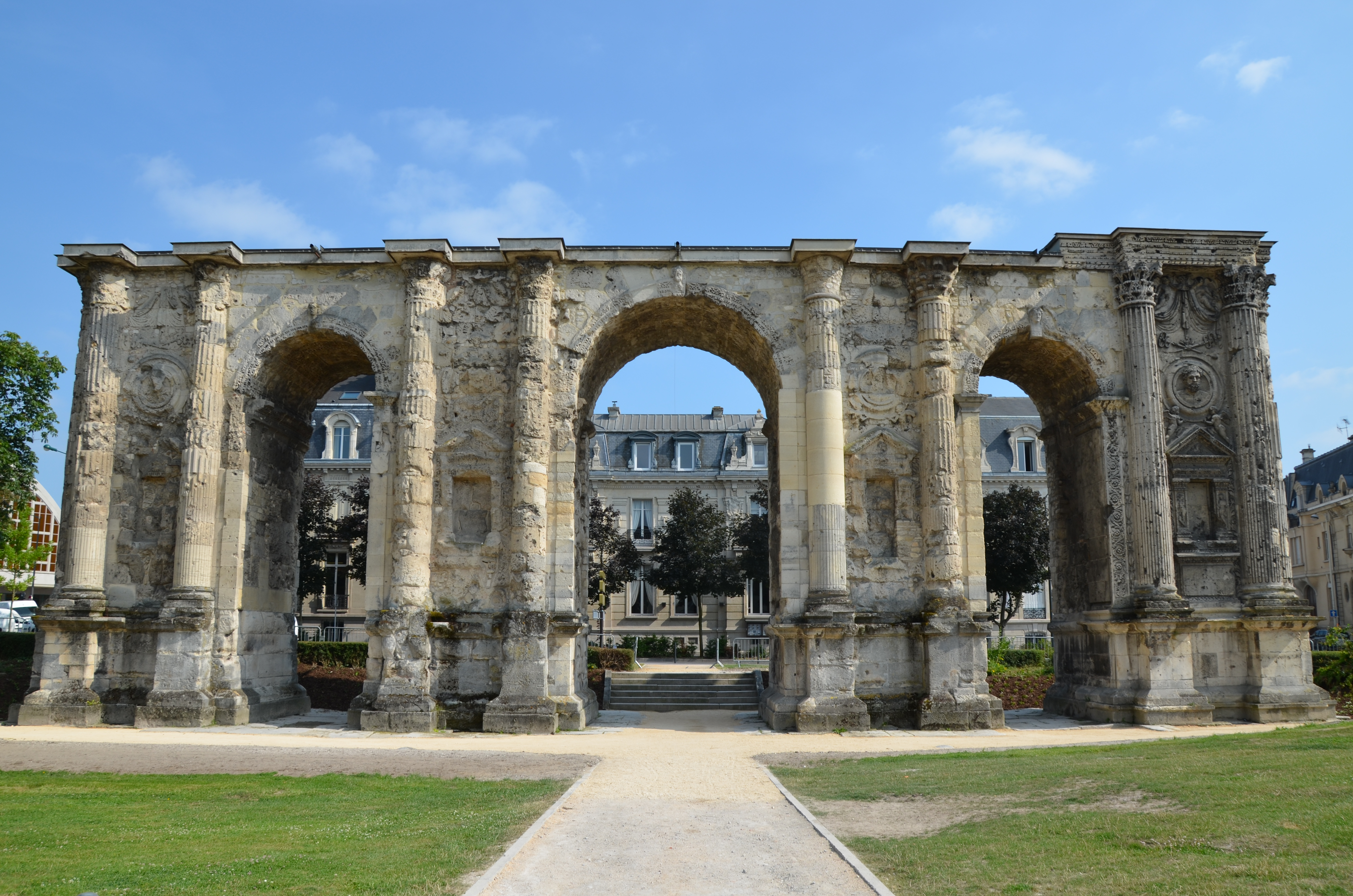
The Porte de Mars in Reims, a triumphal arch from the third century AD.

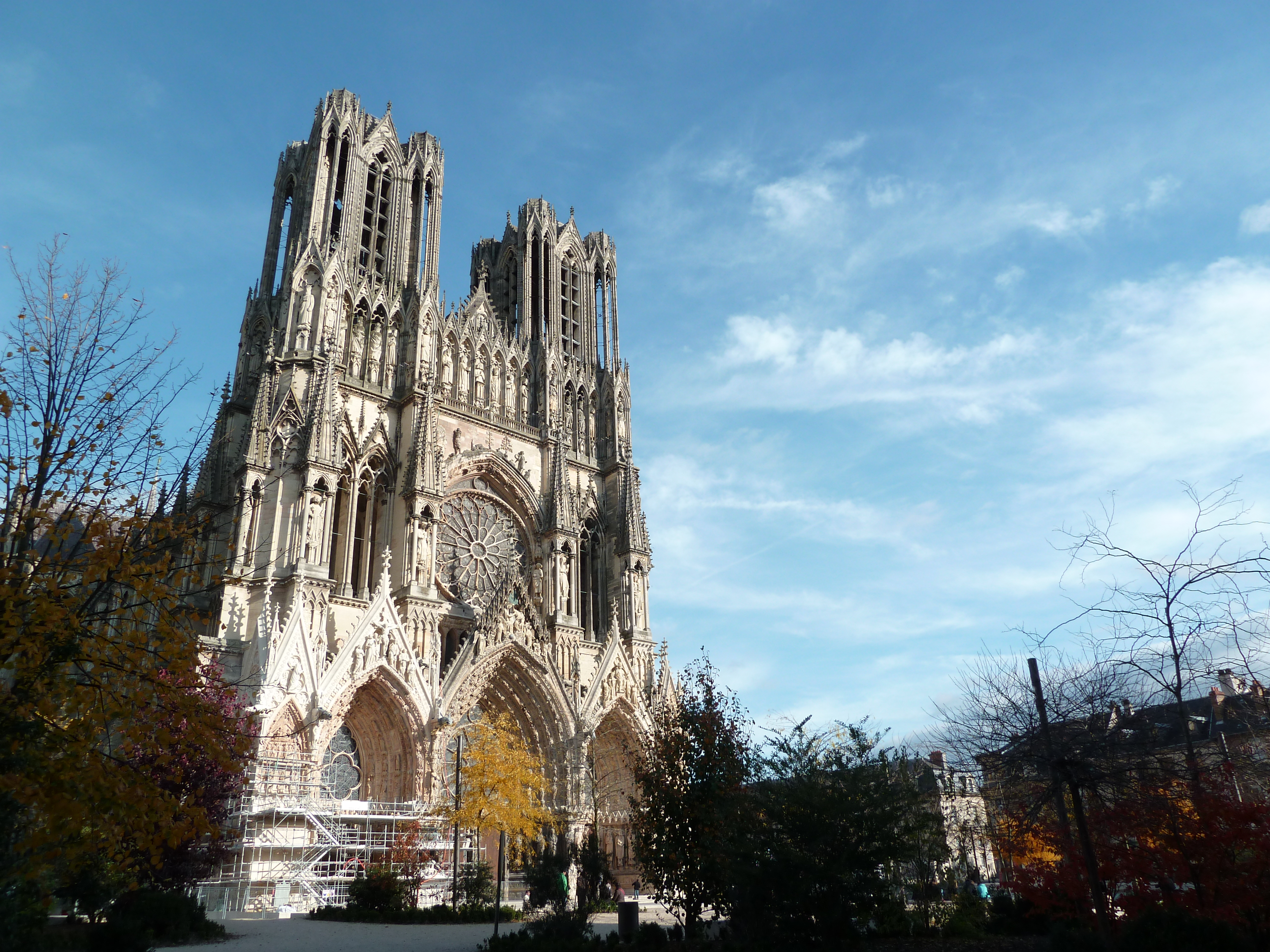
Cathedral of Reims where the kings of France were traditionally crowned

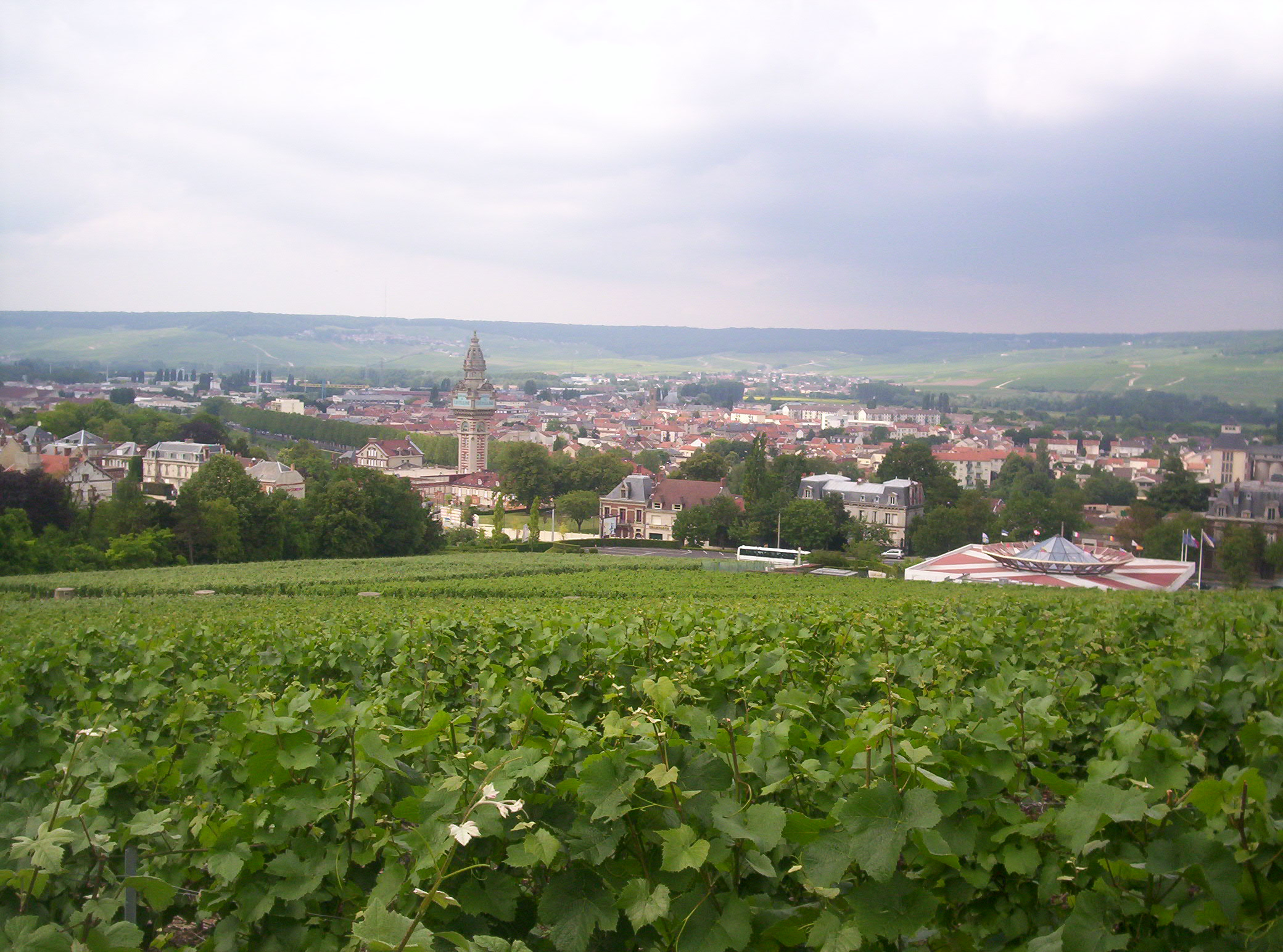
Vineyards near Épernay

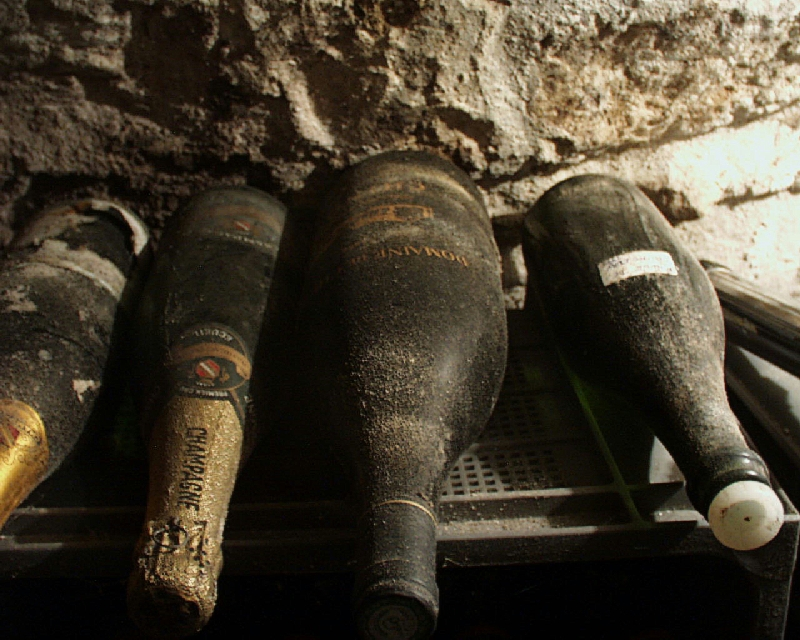
Champagne bottles

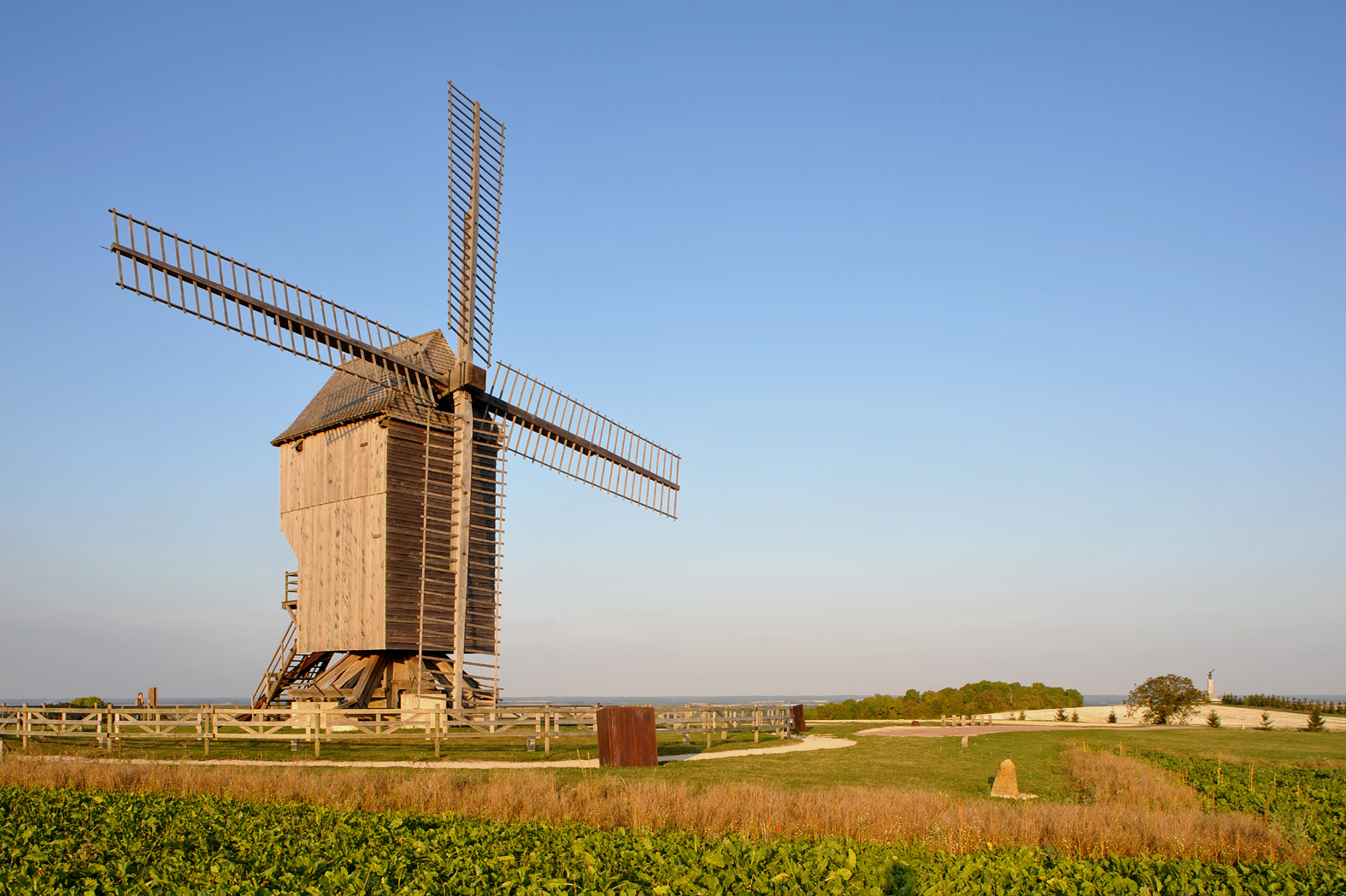
Valmy Battlefield

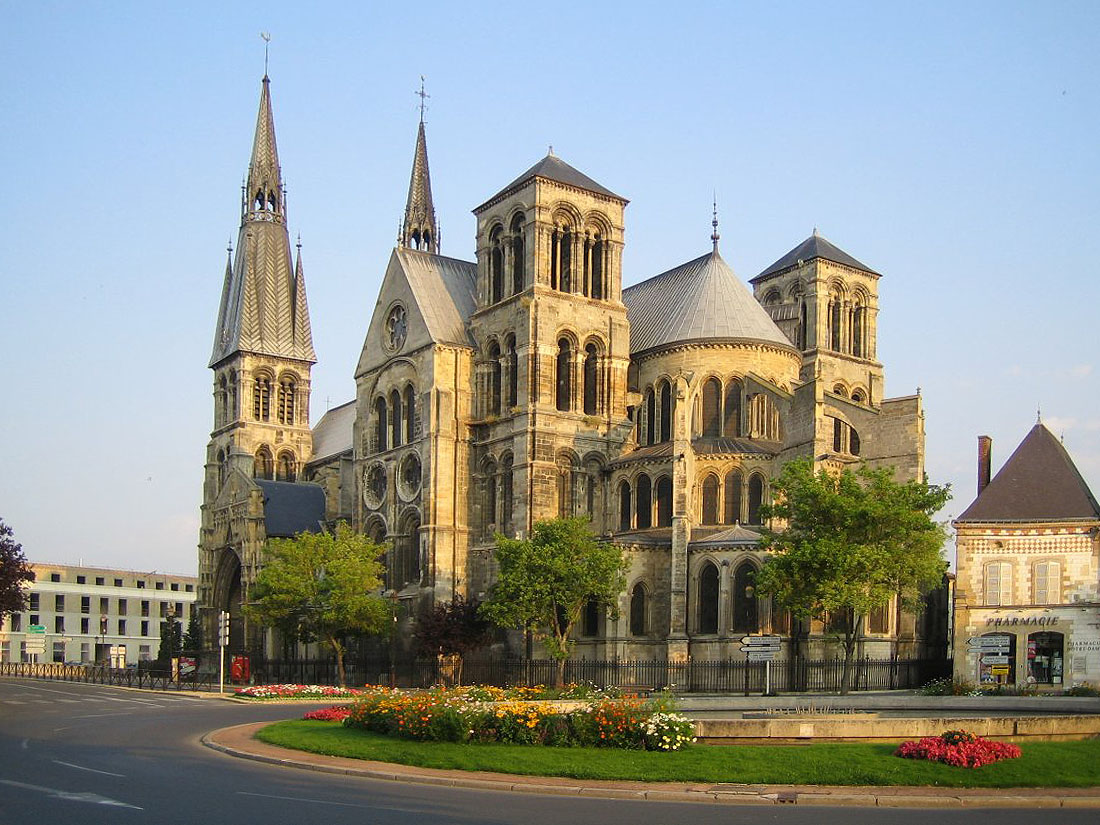
Notre-Dame-en-Vaux collegiate church in Châlons-en-Champagne

== See also ==
- Arrondissements of the Marne department
- Cantons of the Marne department
- Champagne Riots
- Communes of the Marne department
- French wine
