= Nord's 7th constituency =

Constituency of the National Assembly of France

7th constituency of the Nord
- inline Constituency of the National Assembly of France

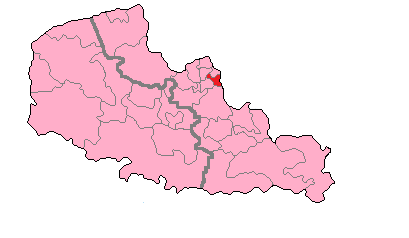
- Nord's 7th Constituency shown within Nord-Pas-de-Calais
- Deputy: Félicie Gérard; Horizons
- Department: Nord
- Cantons: Lannoy (part), Roubaix-Ouest
- Registered voters: 72,159

The 7th constituency of the Nord is a French legislative constituency in the Nord département.

== Description ==
Nord's 7th constituency includes the western portion of Roubaix, the second largest city in Nord-Pas-de-Calais, as well as most of Lannoy which forms its eastern suburbs.

The seat has historically swung between left and right with the Socialist Party in control throughout the 1970s and 1980s. In more recent years, however, the seat has returned the conservative Francis Vercamer originally for the UMP and New Centre party but now for the UDI and Independents group.

== Historic Representation ==
Election	Member	Party
1958	Joseph Frys	UNR
1962	Joseph Frys	UNR
1967	Joseph Frys	UDR
1968	Joseph Frys	UDR
1973	André Desmulliez	PS
1978	Pierre Prouvost	PS
1981	Pierre Prouvost	PS
1986	Proportional representation - no election by constituency	
1988	Bernard Carton	PS
1993	Michel Ghysel	RPR
1997	Guy Hascoët	LV
2002	Francis Vercamer	UMP
2007	Francis Vercamer	NC
2012	Francis Vercamer	NC
2017	Francis Vercamer	UDI
2020	Valérie Six	UDI
2022	Félicie Gérard	HOR

== Election results ==
=== 2024 ===
Legislative Election 2024: Nord's 7th constituency
Party	Candidate	Votes	%	±%
HOR (Ensemble)	Félicie Gérard	17,168	36.71	+9.94
RN	Céline Sayah	13,613	28.15	+12.14
REC	Jean-Sébastien Paul Louis Willem	763	1.63	−2.45
LO	Nicolas Schuurman	617	1.32	N/A
LÉ–EELV (NFP)	Karima Chouia	15,053	32.19	+5.78
Turnout		46,764	97.70	+53.37
Registered electors		73,444		
2nd round result
HOR	Félicie Gérard	18,612	39.53	+2.82
LÉ–EELV	Karima Chouia	15,067	32.00	−0.19
RN	Céline Sayah	13,48	28.47	+0.32
Turnout		48,087	98.17	+0.47
Registered electors		73,452		
HOR hold		Swing		

=== 2022 ===
Legislative Election 2022: Nord's 7th constituency
Party	Candidate	Votes	%	±%
HOR (Ensemble)	Félicie Gérard	8,596	26.77	-7.93
EELV (NUPÉS)	Karima Chouia	8,483	26.41	+4.50
UDI (UDC)	Valérie Six	5,758	17.93	−7.63
RN	Jean-Sébastien Willem	5,141	16.01	+1.29
REC	Mathilde Leconte Duchange	1,311	4.08	N/A
LREM	Nelly Savio*	1,241	3.86	N/A
PA	Jeyan Bichon	678	2.11	N/A
Others	N/A	908	2.83	
Turnout		32,116	44.33	−1.11
2nd round result
HOR (Ensemble)	Félicie Gérard	16,600	55.47	+8.99
EELV (NUPÉS)	Karima Chouia	13,324	44.53	N/A
Turnout		29,924	43.56	+5.02
HOR gain from UDI				

* LREM dissident

=== 2017 ===
Candidate	Label	First round		Second round	
Candidate	Label	Votes	%	Votes	%
Arnaud Verspieren	MoDem	11,226	34.70	11,788	46.48
Francis Vercamer	UDI	8,269	25.56	13,576	53.52
Yann Merlevède	FI	4,792	14.81		
Françoise Coolzaet	FN	4,761	14.72		
Hélène Viard	PS	1,220	3.77		
Karima Chouia	ECO	1,078	3.33		
Abdelkader Chouya	ECO	285	0.88		
Renée Toillon	EXG	285	0.88		
Jonathan Dequidt	DIV	240	0.74		
Marlène Sgard	DVD	193	0.60		
Votes		32,349	100.00	25,364	100.00
Valid votes		32,349	98.28	25,364	90.86
Blank votes		400	1.22	1,853	6.64
Null votes		166	0.50	699	2.50
Turnout		32,915	45.44	27,916	38.54
Abstentions		39,528	54.56	44,526	61.46
Registered voters		72,443		72,442	
Source: Ministry of the Interior

=== 2012 ===
Legislative Election 2012: Nord's 7th constituency
Party	Candidate	Votes	%	±%
NM	Francis Vercamer	15,297	40.71	+10.61
PS	Marjolaine Pierrat-Feraille	12,226	32.53	+1.57
FN	Gianni Meli	5,867	15.61	+7.17
FG	Isabelle Vanspeybroeck	1,857	4.94	N/A
Others	N/A	2,333		
Turnout		37,580	52.08	+0.39
2nd round result
NM	Francis Vercamer	19,606	55.07	+4.81
PS	Marjolaine Pierrat-Feraille	15,994	44.93	−4.81
Turnout		35,600	49.34	−2.45
NM hold				

=== 2007 ===
Legislative Election 2007: Nord's 7th constituency
Party	Candidate	Votes	%	±%
PS	Fanny Bullaert	11,121	30.96	N/A
NM	Francis Vercamer	10,810	30.10	N/A
DVD	Max-André Pick	6,380	17.76	N/A
FN	Sylvie Goddyn	3,030	8.44	−10.78
LV	Slimane Tir	1,722	4.79	−25.52
LCR	Patrick Mortal	958	2.67	+0.42
LO	Françoise Delbarre	821	2.29	−0.08
Others	N/A	1,077		
Turnout		36,717	51.69	−4.11
2nd round result
NM	Francis Vercamer	17,844	50.26	N/A
PS	Fanny Bullaert	17,660	49.74	N/A
Turnout		36,788	51.79	+0.49
NM gain from UMP				

=== 2002 ===
Legislative Election 2002: Nord's 7th constituency
Party	Candidate	Votes	%	±%
UMP	Francis Vercamer	13,492	36.23	+11.64
LV	Guy Hascoët	11,286	30.31	+0.04
FN	Sylvie Goddyn	7,158	19.22	−4.59
LO	Francoise Delbarre	881	2.37	−1.67
LCR	Olvier Marichez	838	2.25	N/A
Others	N/A	3,581		
Turnout		38,169	55.80	−9.27
2nd round result
UMP	Francis Vercamer	17,191	51.01	+17.13
LV	Guy Hascoët	16,510	48.99	+2.25
Turnout		35,094	51.30	−18.61
UMP gain from LV				

=== 1997 ===
Legislative Election 1997: Nord's 7th constituency
Party	Candidate	Votes	%	±%
LV	Guy Hascoët	12,467	30.27	
RPR	Michel Ghysel	10,128	24.59	
FN	Philippe Guérard	9,809	23.81	
MRC	Christian Maes	2,460	5.97	
LO	Marc Cecon	1,664	4.04	
GE	Georges Carlier	1,171	2.84	
Others	N/A	3,490		
Turnout		43,236	65.07	
2nd round result
LV	Guy Hascoët	21,090	46.74	
RPR	Michel Ghysel	15,288	33.88	
FN	Philippe Guérard	8,742	19.38	
Turnout		46,452	69.91	
LV gain from RPR				

== Sources ==
- Official results of French elections from 1998: "Résultats électoraux officiels en France" (in French).
