= Benoist Apparu =

French politician (born 1969)

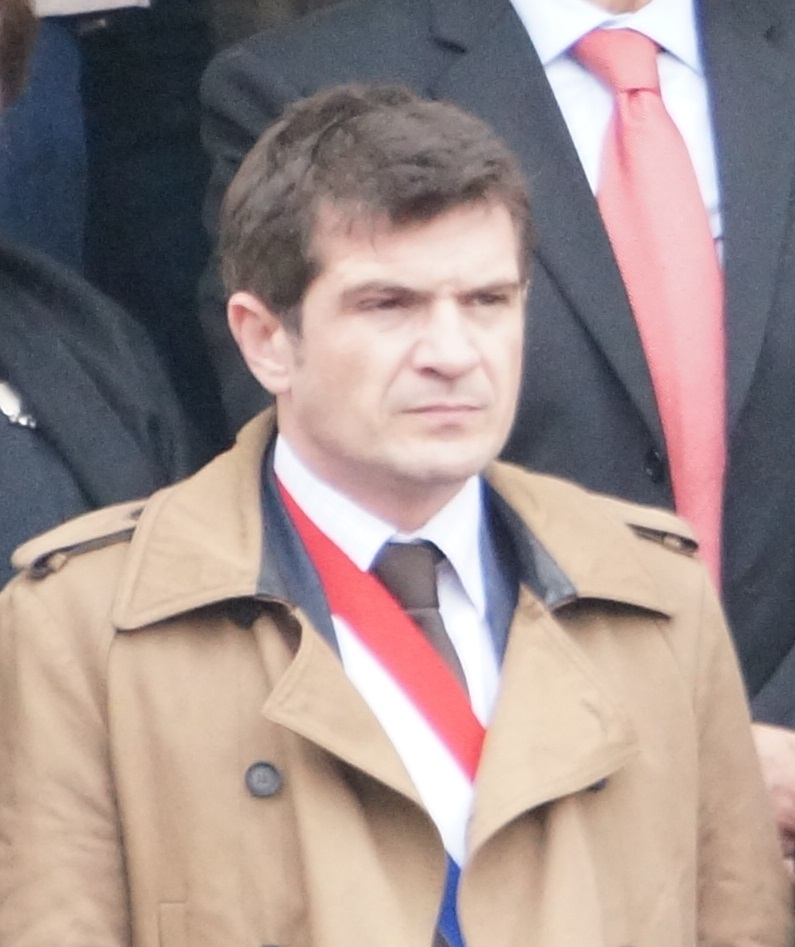
- Apparu in 2014

Mayor of Châlons-en-Champagne
- Incumbent
- Assumed office 5 April 2014
- Preceded by: Bruno Bourg-Roc

Member of the National Assembly for Marne's 4th constituency
- In office 17 June 2012 – 20 June 2017
- Preceded by: Bruno Bourg-Roc
- Succeeded by: Lise Magnier
- In office 20 June 2007 – 23 July 2009
- Preceded by: Bruno Bourg-Roc
- Succeeded by: Bruno Bourg-Roc

Minister Delegate for Housing
- In office 23 June 2009 – 10 May 2012
- President: Nicolas Sarkozy
- Prime Minister: François Fillon
- Preceded by: Christine Boutin
- Succeeded by: Cécile Duflot

Personal details
- Born: 24 November 1969 (age 56) Toulouse, France
- Party: The Republicans (until 2017)
- Education: University of Paris 1 Pantheon-Sorbonne

Benoist Apparu (French pronunciation: [bənwa apaʁy]; born 24 November 1969) is a French politician of The Republicans who served as Secretary of State for Housing under the Minister of Ecology, Sustainable Development, Transport and Housing, Nathalie Kosciusko-Morizet, in the François Fillon III government, and a member of the National Assembly of France. He represented the Marne department,

== Early life and education ==
Benoist Apparu was born on 24 November 1969 in Toulouse, Haute-Garonne, France. He holds a Master's degree in international law from University of Paris 1 Pantheon-Sorbonne.

== Career ==
From 1994 to 1999, Apparu worked as a parliamentary assistant for Bruno Bourg-Broc. In 1996, he was elected as national representative for the young wing of the Rally for the Republic. From 1999 to 2002, he worked in the private sector. In 2001, he served as Deputy-Mayor of Châlons-en-Champagne for Youth and Communication, then for Housing in 2008, as Bruno Bourg-Broc was re-elected. He then worked as Chief of Staff for Xavier Darcos, and for Catherine Vautrin.

In 2007, Apparu was elected as a member of the National Assembly of France. His deputy is Bruno Bourg-Broc. On 23 June 2009 he was named Secretary of State for Housing and City in the François Fillon government, under the responsibility of Jean-Louis Borloo, Minister of the Environment. He was succeeded as MP by Lise Magnier.

== Political positions ==
In January 2013, Apparu was one of the two UMP deputies, along with Franck Riester, to publicly declare his support and vote for a bill legalizing same-sex marriage in France which had been proposed by the government of Prime Minister Jean-Marc Ayrault.
