= Xavier Albertini =

French politician (born 1970)

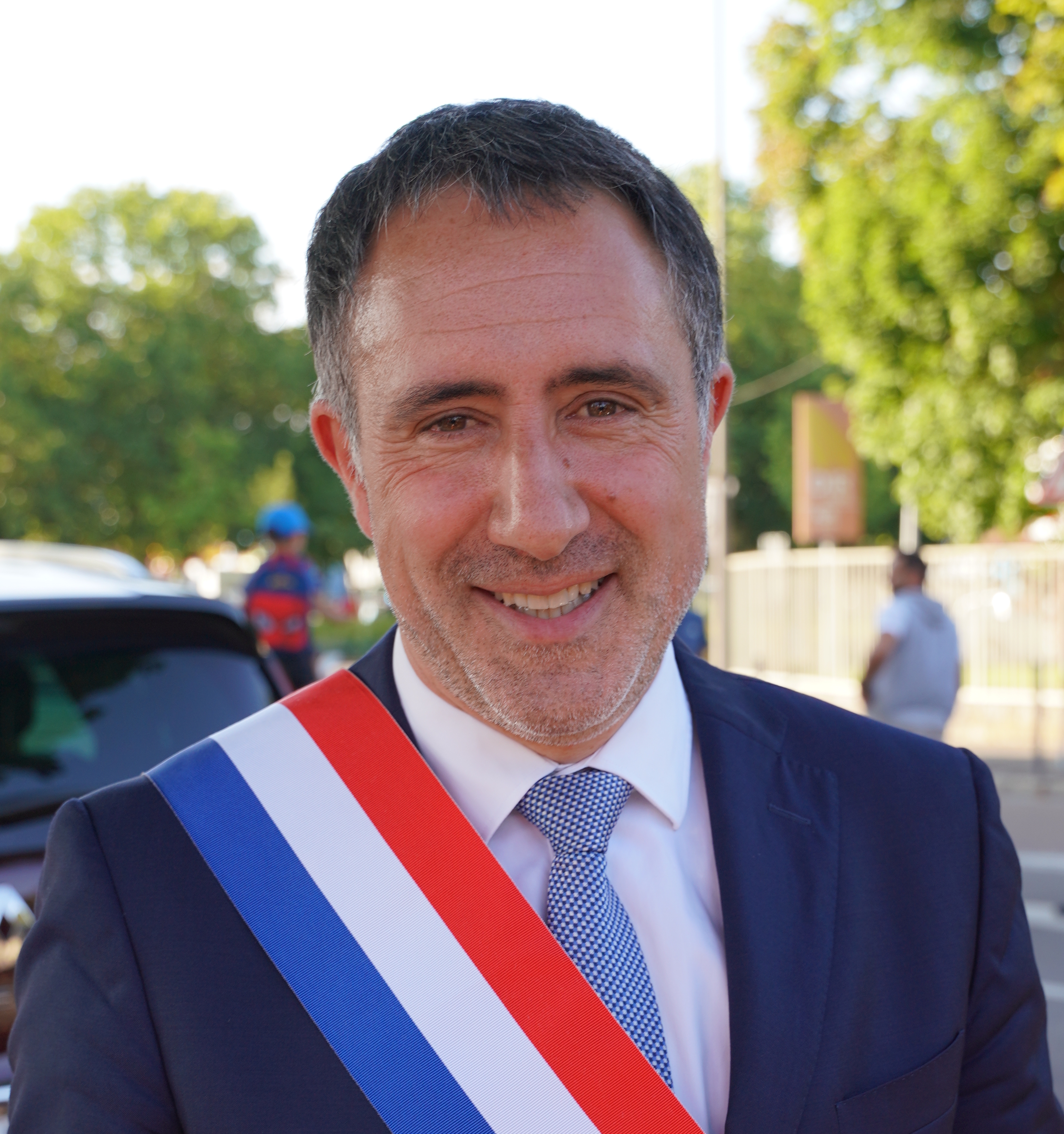
- Xavier Albertini in 2022

Member of the National Assemby for Marne's 1st constituency
- Incumbent
- Assumed office 22 June 2022
- Preceded by: Valérie Beauvais

Personal details
- Born: 28 January 1970 (age 56) Royan, France
- Party: Horizons
- Profession: Lawyer

Xavier Albertini (born 28 January 1970) is a French politician of Horizons who has been Member of Parliament for Marne's 1st constituency in the National Assembly since 2022.

== Political career ==
=== Career in local politics ===
Albertini, a business lawyer by profession, entered politics in 1995 as parliamentary assistant to Jean-Claude Étienne. Initially a member of the RPR, he became an elected official of the city of Reims in 2001 with Jean-Louis Schneiter.

In 2014, Albertini was second deputy to the mayor of Reims, Arnaud Robinet, in charge of security, events, good living, elections and worship. He retained this function for the re-election of the mayor in 2020 until his election in June 2022 to the position of deputy. The law on the non-accumulation of mandates prohibits a parliamentarian from being part of the executive of a local authority.

=== Member of the National Assembly, 2022–present ===
In parliament, Albertini has since been serving on the Committee on Economic Affairs. He briefly also served on the Committee on Sustainable Development, Spatial and Regional Planning from 2022 to 2023.

== See also ==
- List of deputies of the 16th National Assembly of France
