= Valérie Six =

French politician

Member of the National Assembly for Nord's 7th constituency
- In office 23 June 2020 – June 2022
- Preceded by: Francis Vercamer
- Succeeded by: Félicie Gérard

Personal details
- Born: 11 January 1963 (age 63) Seclin, Nord, France
- Party: UDI

Valérie Six (born 11 January 1963) is a French politician from the UDI who was the National Assembly deputy for Nord's 7th constituency from 2020 to 2022.

She lost her seat in the first round of the 2022 French legislative election.
