= Seine-et-Marne's 2nd constituency =

Constituency of the National Assembly of France

2nd constituency of Seine-et-Marne
- inline Constituency of the National Assembly of France

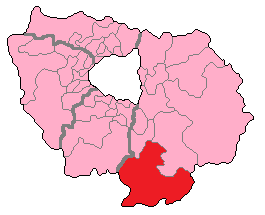
- Seine-et-Marne's 2nd Constituency shown within Île-de-France
- Deputy: Frédéric Valletoux; HOR
- Department: Seine-et-Marne
- Cantons: La Chapelle-la-Reine – Château-Landon – Fontainebleau – Lorrez-le-Bocage-Préaux – Nemours
- Registered voters: 78,540

The 2nd constituency of Seine-et-Marne is a French legislative constituency in the Seine-et-Marne département.

== Description ==
The 2nd constituency of Seine-et-Marne includes the southernmost parts of the department.

Since 1988 it has been a Gaullist stronghold.

== Deputies ==
Election	Member	Party
1958	Guy Chavanne	DVD
1962	Guy Rabourdin	UNR
1967	Didier Julia	UDR
1968	Didier Julia	UDR
1973	Didier Julia	UDR
1978	Didier Julia	RPR
1981	Didier Julia	RPR
1986	Proportional representation – no election by constituency	
1988	Didier Julia	RPR
1993	Didier Julia	RPR
1997	Didier Julia	RPR
2002	Didier Julia	UMP
2007	Didier Julia	UMP
2012	Valérie Lacroute	UMP
2017	Valérie Lacroute	LR
2020	Sylvie Bouchet Bellecourt	LR
2022	Frédéric Valletoux	HOR
2024	Frédéric Valletoux	HOR

== Election results ==
=== 2024 ===
Candidate	Party	Alliance	First round			Second round		
Candidate	Party	Alliance	Votes	%	+/–	Votes	%	+/–
Ivanka Dimitrova	RN		18,887	35.06	+16.49	21,007	40.02	N/A
Frédéric Valletoux	HOR	ENS	18,171	33.73	+5.99	31,490	59.98	+2.56
Nour Benaïssa Watbot	LFI	NFP	12,765	23.70	+0.68	WITHDREW		
Loïc Rousselle	DVE		2,102	3.90	-0.48			
Guillaume Cazauran	REC		991	1.84	-4.34			
Élodie Broch	LO		419	0.78	-0.06			
Stephanie Faury	EXG		377	0.70	N/A			
Valérian Lapkoff	DIV		152	0.28	N/A			
Sophie Balastre	DLF		8	0.01	N/A			
Valid votes			53,872	97.67	-0.48	52,497	95.88	+4.33
Blank votes			926	1.68	+0.29	1,715	3.13	-3.03
Null votes			358	0.65	+0.19	543	0.99	-1.30
Turnout			55,156	68.56	+18.13	54,755	68.05	+20.37
Abstentions			25,288	31.44	-18.13	25,705	31.95	-20.37
Registered voters			80,444			80,460		
Source: Ministry of the Interior, Le Monde
Result						HOR HOLD		

=== 2022 ===
Legislative Election 2022: Seine-et-Marne's 2nd constituency
Party	Candidate	Votes	%	±%
HOR (Ensemble)	Frédéric Valletoux	10,981	27.76	-7.35
LFI (NUPÉS)	Marie-Pierre Molina	9,107	23.02	+7.15
RN	Ivanka Dimitrova	7,345	18.57	+3.31
LR (UDC)	Isoline Garreau	5,754	14.54	−13.91
REC	Guillaume Cazauran	2,444	6.18	N/A
DVE	Loïc Rousselle	1,733	4.38	N/A
PA	Franck Delalande	798	2.02	N/A
Others	N/A	1,400	3.54	
Turnout		39,562	50.43	+0.18
2nd round result
HOR (Ensemble)	Frédéric Valletoux	20,037	57.42	+11.51
LFI (NUPÉS)	Marie-Pierre Molina	14,856	42.58	N/A
Turnout		34,893	47.68	+3.32
HOR gain from LR				

=== 2017 ===
Candidate	Label	First round		Second round	
Candidate	Label	Votes	%	Votes	%
Estelle Rousseau	REM	13,849	35.11	14,897	45.91
Valérie Lacroute	LR	11,223	28.45	17,551	54.09
Marie Garcia	FN	6,020	15.26		
Renaud Hamard	FI	3,727	9.45		
Rose de La Fuente	ECO	1,889	4.79		
Jean-Marc Champniers	DLF	807	2.05		
David Allaert	PCF	643	1.63		
Juanito Durosset	ECO	537	1.36		
Fabien Champagne	DIV	302	0.77		
Élodie Broch	EXG	250	0.63		
Patricia Grimeau	EXG	120	0.30		
Sylvie Henry	REG	81	0.21		
Votes		39,448	100.00	32,448	100.00
Valid votes		39,448	98.45	32,448	91.76
Blank votes		451	1.13	2,137	6.04
Null votes		172	0.43	778	2.20
Turnout		40,071	50.25	35,363	44.36
Abstentions		39,673	49.75	44,364	55.64
Registered voters		79,744		79,727	
Source: Ministry of the Interior

=== 2012 ===
2012 legislative election in Seine-Et-Marne's 2nd constituency
Candidate	Party	First round		Second round	
Candidate	Party	Votes	%	Votes	%
Roseline Sarkissian	PS	13,851	30.24%	20,350	46.76%
Valérie Lacroute	UMP	12,954	28.28%	23,368	53.70%
Gilbert Boucly	FN	6,225	13.59%		
Frédéric Valletoux	UMP dissident	6,033	13.17%		
David Allaert	FG	1,870	4.08%		
Jean-François Robinet	UMP dissident	1,390	3.03%		
Liliane Pays	EELV	1,331	2.91%		
Isabelle Piot	MoDem	924	2.02%		
David Dupre	MRC	536	1.17%		
Stéphane Ayrault	AEI	470	1.03%		
Viviane Moguelet	LO	221	0.48%		
Valid votes		45,805	98.90%	43,518	97.11%
Spoilt and null votes		509	1.10%	1,297	2.89%
Votes cast / turnout		46,314	58.96%	44,815	57.06%
Abstentions		32,234	41.04%	33,725	42.94%
Registered voters		78,548	100.00%	78,540	100.00%

=== 2007 ===
Legislative Election 2007: Seine-et-Marne's 2nd constituency
Party	Candidate	Votes	%	±%
UMP	Didier Julia	16,192	35.04	
DVD	Frédéric Valletoux	9,805	21.22	
PS	Nelly Renaud-Touchard	8,422	18.23	
MoDem	Charles Napoleon	4,046	8.76	
FN	Marie D'Herbais	2,126	4.60	
LV	Liliane Pays	1,689	3.66	
Far left	Jérôme Ferard	1,160	2.51	
Others	N/A	2,765		
Turnout		46,787	60.55	
2nd round result
UMP	Didier Julia	18,442	57.77	
DVD	Frédéric Valletoux	13,482	42.23	
Turnout		37,048	47.94	
UMP hold				

=== 2002 ===
Legislative Election 2002: Seine-et-Marne's 2nd constituency
Party	Candidate	Votes	%	±%
UMP	Didier Julia	21,435	46.09	
PS	Nelly Renaud-Touchard	11,034	23.72	
FN	Jean-Claude Berthier	6,050	13.01	
DVD	Philippe Tissot	3,187	6.85	
LV	Liliane Pays	1,771	3.81	
Others	N/A	3,033		
Turnout		47,207	65.49	
2nd round result
UMP	Didier Julia	26,353	64.96	
PS	Nelly Renaud-Touchard	14,212	35.04	
Turnout		42,026	58.31	
UMP hold				

=== 1997 ===
Legislative Election 1997: Seine-et-Marne's 2nd constituency
Party	Candidate	Votes	%	±%
RPR	Didier Julia	17,671	39.19	
PS	Nelly Renaud-Touchard	9,088	20.15	
FN	Gérard Louis	7,872	17.46	
PCF	Liliane Ganille	2,663	5.91	
LV	Philippe Mouche	1,924	4.27	
DVD	Frédéric Fournier	1,542	3.42	
LO	Marie-Adélaïde Doublet	1,276	2.83	
GE	Emmanuel Mignon	1,192	2.64	
Others	N/A	1,866		
Turnout		46,857	67.19	
2nd round result
RPR	Didier Julia	26,983	58.87	
PS	Nelly Renaud-Touchard	18,885	41.13	
Turnout		48,542	69.62	
RPR hold				

== Sources ==
Official results of French elections from 2002: "Résultats électoraux officiels en France" (in French).
