= Valérie Beauvais =

French politician

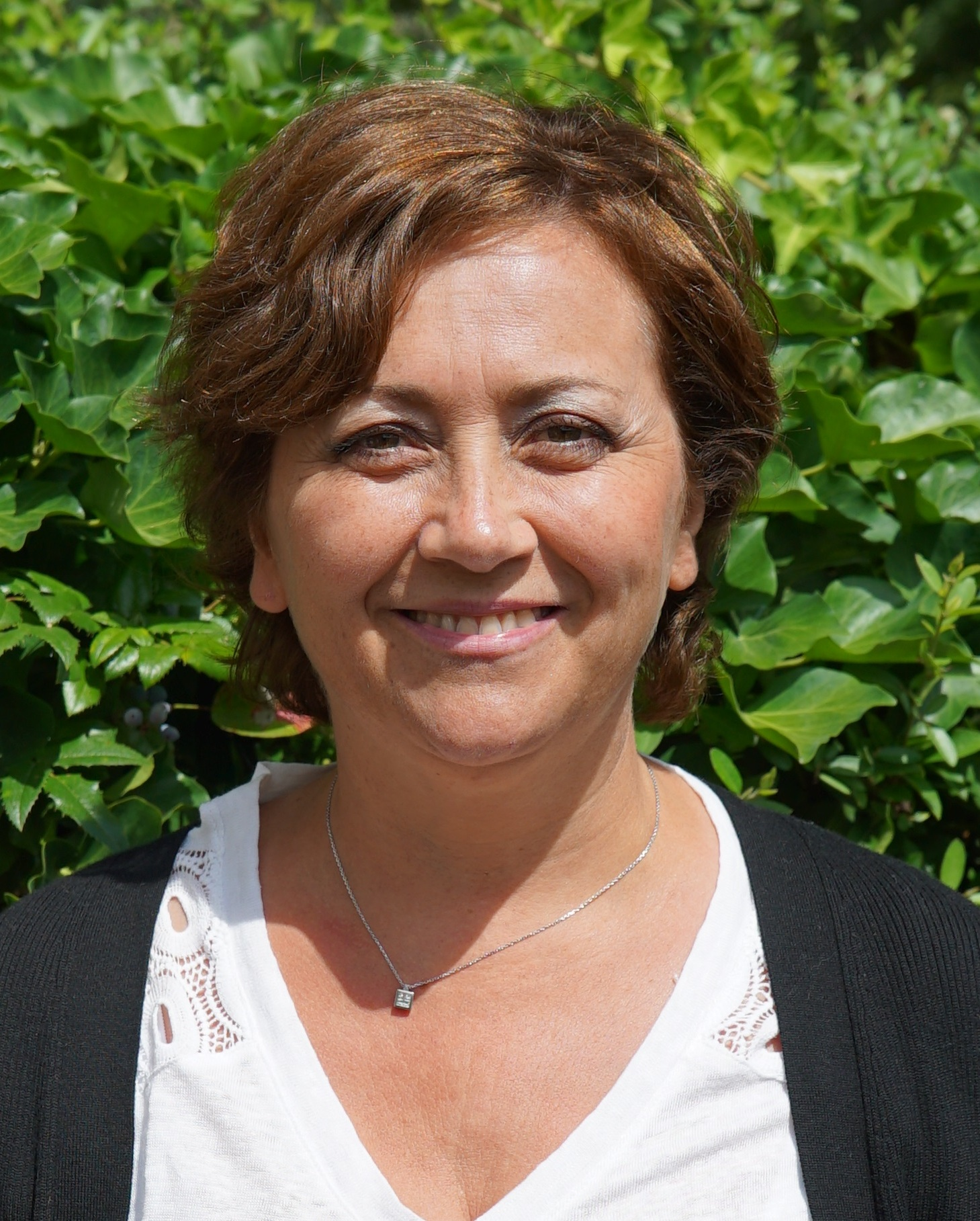

Member of the National Assembly for Marne's 1st constituency
- In office 21 June 2017 – June 2022
- Preceded by: Arnaud Robinet
- Succeeded by: Xavier Albertini

Personal details
- Born: 8 March 1963 (age 63) Nevers, Nièvre, Burgundy, France
- Party: Republican

Valérie Beauvais (born 8 March 1963) is a French politician of The Republicans (LR) who represented Marne's 1st constituency in the National Assembly from the 2017 election until 2022.

== Political career ==
Beauvis succeeded Arnaud Robinet at the 2017 election.

On 21 November 2018, Beauvis was appointed as Shadow Family Minister by Laurent Wauquiez.

She lost her seat in the first round of the 2022 French legislative election.
