= Morbihan's 1st constituency =

Constituency of the National Assembly of France

1st constituency of Morbihan
- inline Constituency of the National Assembly of France

- Constituency in Department

- Location of Morbihan in France
- Deputy: Anne Le Hénanff; Horizons
- Department: Morbihan
- Cantons: Muzillac, La Roche-Bernard, Sarzeau, Vannes Centre, Vannes Est, Vannes Ouest

The 1st constituency of Morbihan is a French legislative constituency in the Morbihan département. Like the other 576 French constituencies, it elects one MP using the two-round system, with a run-off if no candidate receives over 50% of the vote in the first round.

== Historic representation ==
Election	Member	Party
1988	Raymond Marcellin	UDF
1993	Raymond Marcellin	UDF
1997	François Goulard	LR
2002	François Goulard	UMP
2004	Josiane Boyce	UMP
2007	François Goulard	UMP
2012	Hervé Pellois	DVG
2017	Hervé Pellois	LREM
2022	Anne Le Hénanff	Horizons
2024	Anne Le Hénanff	Horizons

== Election results ==
=== 2024 ===
Legislative Election 2024: Morbihan's 1st constituency
Party	Candidate	Votes	%	±%
REG	Ronan Le Sant	1,084	1.28	N/A
DVG	Yann Le Baraillec	1,898	2.24	−22.77
RN	Joseph Martin	21,454	25.37	+36.95
DIV	Alice Vasseur	182	0.22	N/A
DVG (NFP)	Anne Gallo	23,884	28.24	+3.23
LO	Marc Peschanski	432	0.51	N/A
HOR (Ensemble)	Anne Le Hénanff	35,627	42.13	+8.08
Turnout		84,561	98.07	+43.45
Registered electors		115,573		
2nd round result
HOR	Anne Le Hénanff	57,609	71.65	+29.52
RN	Joseph Martin	22,792	28.35	+2.98
Turnout		80,401	94.82	−3.25
Registered electors		115,599		
HOR hold		Swing		

=== 2022 ===
Legislative Election 2022: Morbihan's 1st constituency
Party	Candidate	Votes	%	±%
HOR (Ensemble)	Anne Le Hénanff	21,004	34.05	-10.35
DVG (NUPÉS)	Luc Foucault	15,432	25.01	+9.81
RN	Lydia Veronique Caroline Le Barz	7,145	11.58	+4.55
LR (UDC)	François Ars	5,009	8.12	−8.58
LR	François Mousset*	3,914	6.34	N/A
REC	Franck Chevrel	2,954	4.79	N/A
FGR	Yann Le Baraillec	2,050	3.32	N/A
Others	N/A	4,184	6.78	
Turnout		61,692	54.62	−1.76
2nd round result
HOR (Ensemble)	Anne Le Hénanff	34,382	59.25	-5.16
DVG (NUPÉS)	Luc Foucault	23,648	40.75	+5.16
Turnout		58,030	53.86	+7.13
HOR gain from LREM				

* LR dissident

=== 2017 ===
Candidate	Label	First round		Second round	
Candidate	Label	Votes	%	Votes	%
Hervé Pellois	REM	25,916	44.40	29,243	64.41
Christine Penhouet	LR	9,746	16.70	16,156	35.59
Céline Meneses	FI	5,237	8.97		
Bertrand Iragne	FN	4,105	7.03		
Hortense Le Pape	DVD	3,751	6.43		
Pascal Baudont	ECO	2,863	4.90		
Odile Monnet	UDI	1,968	3.37		
Jean-François Hervieu	DLF	923	1.58		
Anita Kervadec	PCF	776	1.33		
Cédric de Lagarde	DVD	577	0.99		
David Vigent	DIV	576	0.99		
Laurence Dumas	REG	567	0.97		
Jean-Jacques Page	REG	400	0.69		
Claudine Duval	DIV	369	0.63		
Laurent Louis	EXD	360	0.62		
Patrice Crunil	EXG	240	0.41		
Votes		58,374	100.00	45,399	100.00
Valid votes		58,374	98.24	45,399	92.19
Blank votes		783	1.32	2,867	5.82
Null votes		262	0.44	977	1.98
Turnout		59,419	56.38	49,243	46.73
Abstentions		45,975	43.62	56,145	53.27
Registered voters		105,394		105,388	
Source: Ministry of the Interior

=== 2012 ===
Legislative Election 2012: Morbihan's 1st constituency
Party	Candidate	Votes	%	±%
UMP	François Goulard	20,260	32.63	−13.83
DVG	Hervé Pellois	16,358	26.34	N/A
PS	Claude Jahier	10,316	16.61	−15.36
FN	Bruno Petit	5,278	8.50	+5.26
AC	Gilles Dufeigneux	2,979	4.80	N/A
EELV	Akim Khounchef	1,681	2.71	−1.18
FG	Annick Monot	1,567	2.52	+1.28
MoDem	Odile Monnet	1,313	2.11	N/A
Others	N/A	2,346	-	−
Turnout		62,098	62.80	−1.97
2nd round result
DVG	Hervé Pellois	32,733	52.45	N/A
UMP	François Goulard	29,679	47.55	−5.35
Turnout		62,412	63.12	−0.20
DVG gain from UMP				

=== 2007 ===
Legislative Election 2007: Morbihan's 1st constituency
Party	Candidate	Votes	%	±%
UMP	François Goulard	30,856	46.46	−2.31
PS	Hervé Pellois	21,235	31.97	+0.29
LV	Christian Le Moigne	2,583	3.89	+0.19
FN	Christine Ravaux	2,152	3.24	−4.19
DIV	Yves Mevel	1,859	2.80	N/A
DVD	Gabriel Guilloux	1,530	2.30	N/A
Others	N/A	6,199	-	−
Turnout		67,704	64.77	−4.10
2nd round result
UMP	François Goulard	34,174	52.90	−5.17
PS	Hervé Pellois	30,429	47.10	+5.17
Turnout		66,180	63.32	−0.88
UMP hold				

=== 2002 ===
Legislative Election 2002: Morbihan's 1st constituency
Party	Candidate	Votes	%	±%
UMP	François Goulard	30,773	48.77	N/A
PS	Hervé Pellois	19,991	31.68	+5.64
FN	Bruno Petit	4,689	7.43	−3.83
LV	Anne Camus	2,334	3.70	+0.20
Others	N/A	5,308	-	−
Turnout		63,994	68.87	−1.25
2nd round result
UMP	François Goulard	34,001	58.07	N/A
PS	Hervé Pellois	24,554	41.93	−3.03
Turnout		59,959	64.20	−7.69
UMP gain from PR				

=== 1997 ===
Legislative Election 1997: Morbihan's 1st constituency
Party	Candidate	Votes	%	±%
PS	Micheline Rakotonirina	14,381	26.04	
PR (UDF)	François Goulard	14,200	25.71	
UDF	Pierre Pavec*	11,866	21.49	
FN	Bruno Petil	6,219	11.26	
PCF	Pierre Joubin	2,752	4.98	
LV	André Guillais	1,935	3.50	
GE	Claude Landa	1,517	2.75	
REG	Yannig Baron	1,203	2.18	
Others	N/A	1,150	-	
Turnout		57,609	70.12	
2nd round result
PR (UDF)	François Goulard	30,998	55.04	
PS	Micheline Rakotonirina	25,318	44.96	
Turnout		59,046	71.89	
PR hold				

* UDF dissident; withdrew before the 2nd round

== Sources ==
- Official results of French elections from 2002: "Résultats électoraux officiels en France" (in French).
- Official results of French elections from 2007: "Résultats électoraux officiels en France" (in French).
- Official results of French elections from 2012: "Résultats électoraux officiels en France" (in French).
- Official results of French elections from 2017: "Résultats électoraux officiels en France" (in French).
