= Marne's 4th constituency =

Constituency of the National Assembly of France

4th constituency of Marne
- inline Constituency of the National Assembly of France

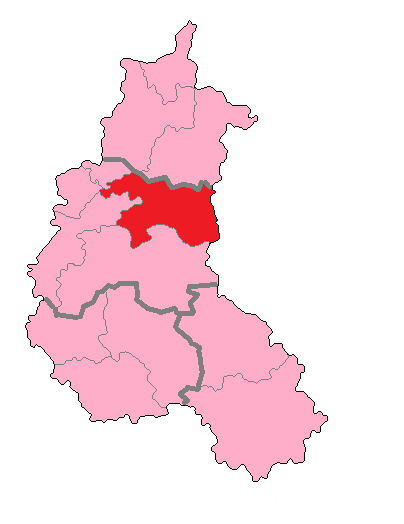
- The constituency shown within Champagne-Ardenne
- Incumbent deputy: Lise Magnier; Horizons
- Department: Marne
- Cantons: Châlons-sur-Marne I, Châlons-sur-Marne II, Châlons-sur-Marne III, Châlons-sur-Marne IV, Givry-en-Argonne, Marson, Sainte-Menehould, Ville-sur-Tourbe
- Registered voters: 78,818 (2017)

The 4th constituency of Marne (French: Quatrième circonscription de la Marne) is one of five electoral districts in the department of the same name. Each electoral district returns one deputy to the French National Assembly in elections using the two-round system, with a run-off if no candidate receives more than 50% of the vote in the first round.

== Description ==
The constituency – which covers the north-eastern part of the department and includes the prefecture of Châlons-en-Champagne – is made up of eight (pre-2015) cantons: those of Châlons-sur-Marne I, Châlons-sur-Marne II, Châlons-sur-Marne III, Châlons-sur-Marne IV, Givry-en-Argonne, Marson, Sainte-Menehould, and Ville-sur-Tourbe.

Like the others in the department, the 4th constituency has leaned consistently towards the right politically, once again returning a conservative – Lise Magnier of Les Républicains – in the 2017 election. However, shortly after the election Magnier joined Agir, a moderate-right party supporting Emmanuel Macron's centrist parliamentary majority.

== Historic representation ==
Election	Member	Party
1986	Proportional representation – no election by constituency	
1988	Bruno Bourg-Broc	RPR
1993	Bruno Bourg-Broc	RPR
1997	Bruno Bourg-Broc	RPR
2002	Bruno Bourg-Broc	UMP
2007	Benoist Apparu	UMP
2012	Benoist Apparu	UMP
2017	Lise Magnier	LR
2017	Lise Magnier	Agir
2022	Lise Magnier	Horizons

== Election results ==
=== 2024 ===
Legislative Election 2024: Marne's 4th constituency
Party	Candidate	Votes	%	±%
DIV	Marty Ducanda	134	0.27	N/A
HOR (Ensemble)	Lise Magnier	15,245	30.98	−2.22
LFI (NFP)	Maxence Laurent	8,845	17.97	−0.82
LR	Gabriel Michel	3,249	6.60	−3.54
LO	Laurent Gosseau	690	1.40	N/A
RN	Achille Bisiaux	21,045	42.77	14.84
Turnout		49208	97.46	+52.33
Registered electors		77,894		
2nd round result
HOR	Lise Magnier	25,550	52.22	+21.24
RN	Achille Bisiaux	25,550	52.22	+21.24
Turnout		48928	96.06	−1.40
Registered electors		77,895		
HOR hold		Swing		

=== 2022 ===
Legislative Election 2022: Marne's 4th constituency
Party	Candidate	Votes	%	±%
HOR (Ensemble)	Lise Magnier*	11,329	33.20	N/A
RN	Thierry Besson	9,533	27.93	+8.03
LFI (NUPÉS)	Anthony Smith	6,411	18.79	−5.58
LR (UDC)	Jean-Louis Devaux	3,461	10.14	−11.90
DVE	Pascal Picart	1,153	3.38	+2.42
REC	Emilie Laurence Bry	950	2.78	N/A
Others	N/A	1,289	-	−
Turnout		34,126	45.13	−0.98
2nd round result
HOR (Ensemble)	Lise Magnier*	17,294	55.33	N/A
RN	Thierry Besson	13,962	44.67	+11.55
Turnout		31,256	43.71	+2.02
HOR gain from LR				

* Magnier stood for LR at the previous election and swings are calculated based on parties and alliances.

=== 2017 ===
Candidate	Label	First round		Second round	
Candidate	Label	Votes	%	Votes	%
Lise Magnier	LR	7,832	22.04	19,946	66.88
Thierry Besson	FN	7,072	19.90	9,878	33.12
Bertrand Courot	DVD	6,053	17.03		
Anne-Sophie Godfroy	DVD	4,228	11.90		
Claudine Lang	FI	3,479	9.79		
Rudy Namur	PS	3,291	9.26		
Françoise Brunel	ECO	888	2.50		
Sandrine Henriques-Godart	DLF	871	2.45		
Dominique Vatel	PCF	645	1.82		
Pascal Picart	ECO	340	0.96		
Charlotte Cormerais	EXG	313	0.88		
Bernard Calujek	EXD	289	0.81		
Manon Poinas	DIV	233	0.66		
Votes		35,534	100.00	29,824	100.00
Valid votes		35,534	97.78	29,824	90.77
Blank votes		592	1.63	2,157	6.57
Null votes		216	0.59	875	2.66
Turnout		36,342	46.11	32,856	41.69
Abstentions		42,476	53.89	45,962	58.31
Registered voters		78,818		78,818	
Source: Ministry of the Interior

=== 2012 ===
Legislative Election 2012: Marne's 4th constituency
Party	Candidate	Votes	%	±%
UMP	Benoist Apparu	16,580	37.30	
PS	Rudy Namur	14,529	32.68	
FN	Edith Erre	6,913	15.55	
FG	Dominique Vatel	2,109	4.74	
DVD	Bertrand Courot	1,956	4.40	
EELV	Dominique Determ	1,216	2.74	
Others	N/A	1,152		
Turnout		44,455	54.92	
2nd round result
UMP	Benoist Apparu	22,382	52.49	
PS	Rudy Namur	20,260	47.51	
Turnout		42,642	52.69	
UMP hold				

== Sources ==
Official results of French elections from 2002: "Résultats électoraux officiels en France" (in French).

Official results of French elections from 2017: "" (in French).
