= Anne-Cécile Violland =

French politician (born 1973)

Member of the National Assembly for Haute-Savoie's 5th constituency
- Incumbent
- Assumed office 22 June 2022
- Preceded by: Marion Lenne

Personal details
- Born: 10 June 1973 (age 52) Évian-les-Bains, France
- Party: Horizons

Anne-Cécile Violland (born 10 June 1973) is a French politician. As a member of Horizons, she was elected member of parliament for Haute-Savoie's 5th constituency in the 2022 French legislative election.

In February 2023, she was appointed president of the Environmental Health Group (GSE). She was re-elected in the 2024 French legislative election.

== See also ==
- List of deputies of the 16th National Assembly of France
- List of deputies of the 17th National Assembly of France
