= Hervé Pellois =

French politician (born 1951)

Member of the National Assembly for Morbihan's 1st constituency
- In office 20 June 2012 – 22 June 2022
- Preceded by: François Goulard
- Succeeded by: Anne Le Hénanff

Mayor of Saint-Avé
- In office 20 March 1989 – 29 March 2014
- Preceded by: Michel Allanic
- Succeeded by: Anne Gallo

Personal details
- Born: 17 April 1951 (age 74) La Chapelle-Blanche, Côtes-d'Armor, France
- Party: Socialist Party (1974–2012); Miscellaneous left (2012–2017); La République En Marche! (2017–present); Territories of Progress (2020–present)

Hervé Pellois (born 17 April 1951) is a French politician representing La République En Marche! (LREM) and Territories of Progress (TDP). He was elected to the French National Assembly on 20 June 2012 as a miscellaneous left candidate, representing the department of Morbihan.

== See also ==
- 2017 French legislative election
