= Anne Le Hénanff =

French politician (born 1969)

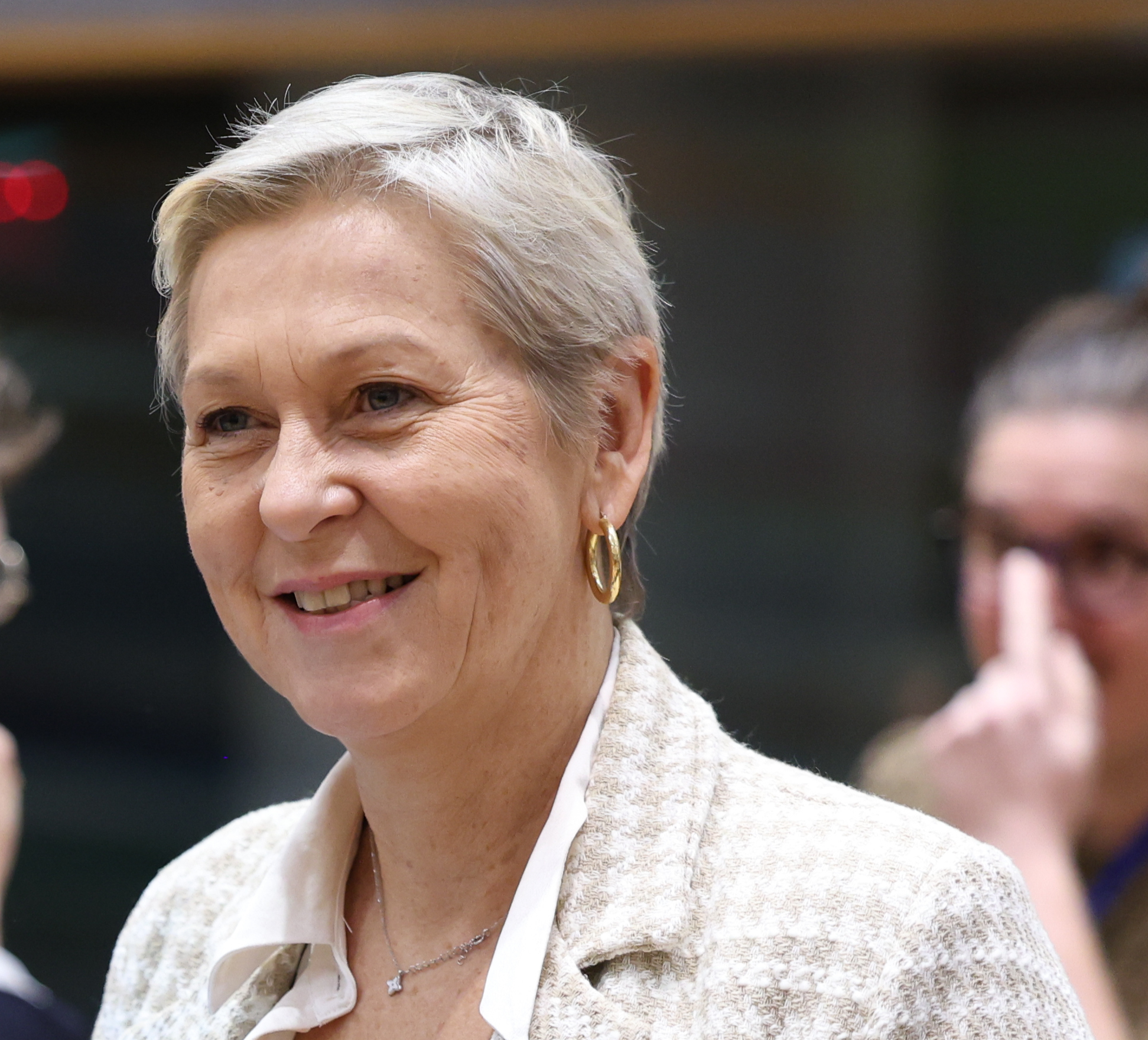
- Anne Le Hénanff TTE in 2025.

Member of the National Assembly for Morbihan's 1st constituency
- Incumbent
- Assumed office 22 June 2022
- Preceded by: Hervé Pellois

Personal details
- Born: 22 July 1969 (age 57) Vannes, France
- Party: Horizons

Anne Le Hénanff (born 22 July 1969) is a French politician of Horizons who has been serving as Minister Delegate for Artificial Intelligence in the government of Prime Minister Sébastien Lecornu since 2025.

== Political career ==
Le Hénanff previously served as member of parliament for Morbihan's 1st constituency since the 2022 French legislative election. She was elected to a second term in the 2024 French legislative election.

In parliament, Le Hénanff served on the Defence Committee from 2022 to 2024. In addition to her committee assignments, she chaired the French-Vietnamese Parliamentary Friendship Group from 2022 to 2024.

== See also ==
- List of deputies of the 16th National Assembly of France
- List of deputies of the 17th National Assembly of France
