= Félicie Gérard =

French politician (born 1974)

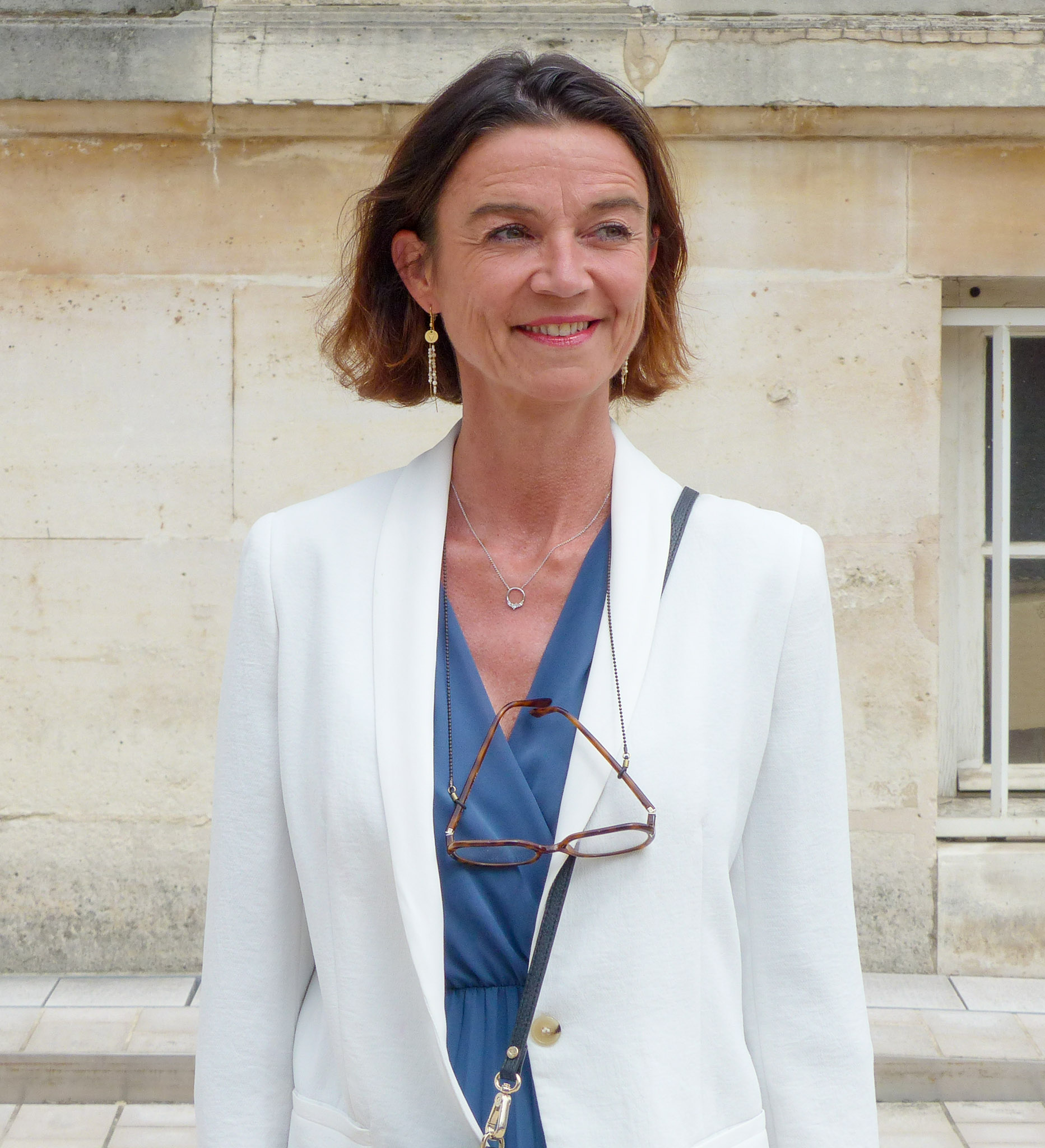

Member of the National Assembly for Nord's 7th constituency
- Incumbent
- Assumed office 22 June 2022
- Preceded by: Valérie Six

Personal details
- Born: 28 January 1974 (age 52) Vervins, France
- Party: Horizons (since 2021)
- Other political affiliations: Union of Democrats and Independents (2015–2016); La République En Marche! (2016–2021)

Félicie Gérard (French pronunciation: [felisi ʒeʁaʁ]; born 28 January 1974) is a French politician. As a member of Horizons (HOR), she was elected the deputy for Nord's 7th constituency in the 2022 legislative election and re-elected in 2024.

== Biography ==
=== Family origin ===
Félicie Gérard is a native of Aisne and her father is a farmer.

=== Education and family ===
Félicie Gérard has lived in the Capreau district of Wasquehal since 1999 and has two children. She has worked in the associative sector for many years, in scouting, as a parent of students and in associations which help seriously ill children with the Rêves and Relais des Rêves.

She was an industrial customer advisor at Électricité de France from 2007 to 2017. She was a project manager in this company in 2022, before her election as a deputy.

=== Political career ===
Félicie Gérard entered politics by becoming deputy to the mayor of Wasquehal, Stéphanie Ducret, following the 2014 municipal election. However, on 22 June 2015, the Council of State cancelled the election of March 2014 following the appeal of Alexis Salmon, leader of the National Front list, for an administrative error resulting from the list of Marijan Frigout (miscellaneous right) who came in second position in the second round. The municipal campaign once again saw eight party lists claiming to lead the city. Stéphanie Ducret's list wins these new elections. Félicie Gérard, was then deputy mayor in charge of community life. Following the 2020 municipal elections, which saw the victory of Stéphanie Ducret, Gérard became the sixth deputy mayor in charge of associations, participatory democracy and intercommunity.

She was a member of the UDI from 2015 to 2016 then of LREM until 2021. She then joined Horizons when it was founded as a political party.

In the 2022 legislative election, Gérard was a candidate in Nord's 7th constituency under the Ensemble coalition. In the first round the incumbent UDI deputy Valérie Six who ran under the Union of the Right and Centre lost her seat, placing third. Gérard won the seat in the second round with 55.4% of the vote against Karima Chouia of Europe Ecology – The Greens who ran under the NUPES alliance. She announced that she would like to obtain an increase in the number of staff at the Roubaix police station and would like to invest nationally in the theme of education. She sits in the National Assembly with the Horizons and related group.

In the 2024 legislative election, she was re-elected in the second round against two other candidates in a triangular election with 39.5% of the vote.

== Mandates ==
- From 5 April 2014: deputy mayor of Wasquehal
- Since 22 June 2022: deputy for Nord's 7th constituency

== See also ==
- List of deputies of the 16th National Assembly of France
- List of deputies of the 17th National Assembly of France
