= Arnaud Robinet =

French politician (born 1975)

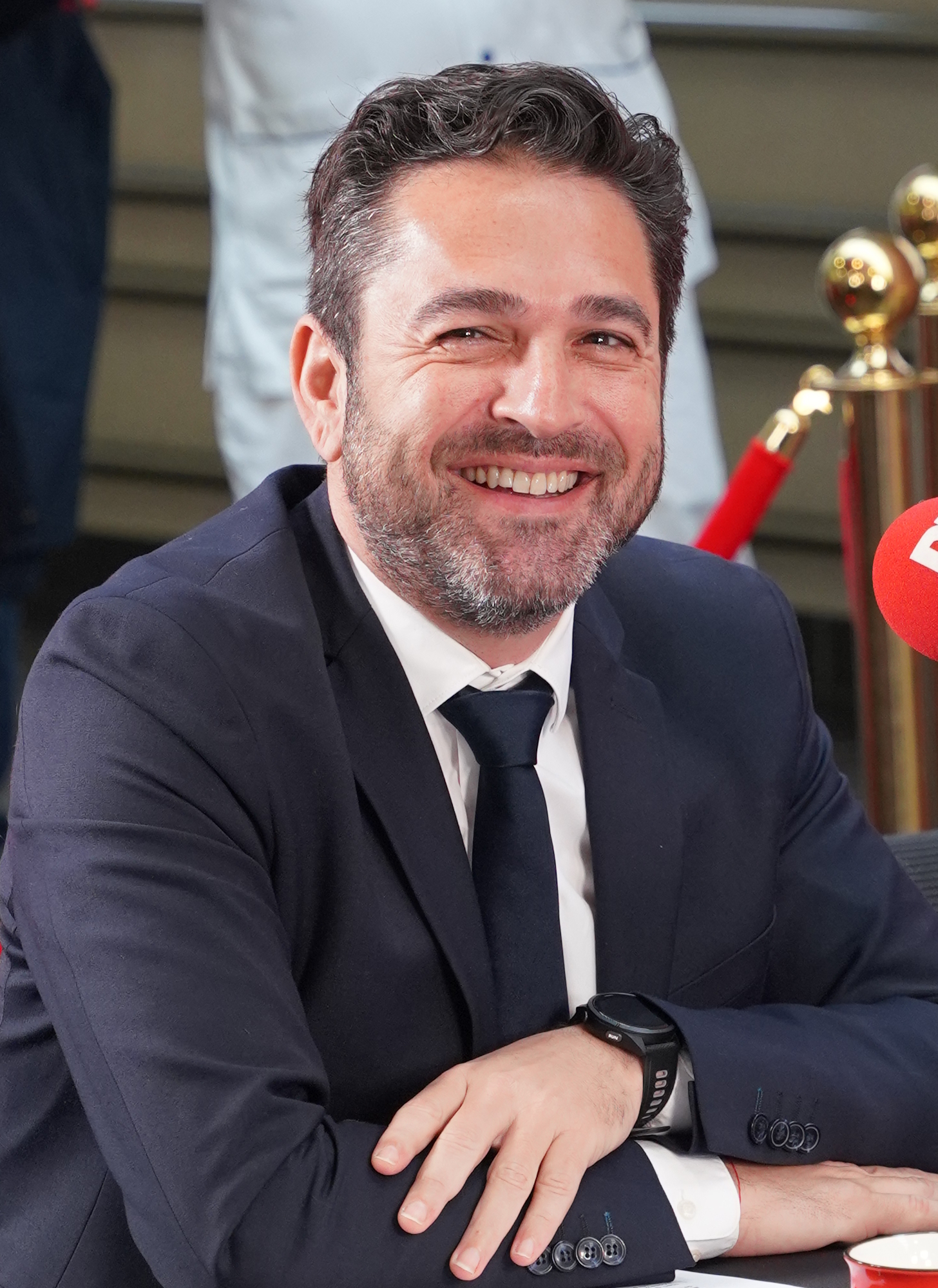
- Robinet in 2024

Mayor of Reims
- Incumbent
- Assumed office 4 April 2014
- Preceded by: Adeline Hazan

Member of the French National Assembly for Marne's 1st constituency
- In office 15 December 2008 – 20 June 2017
- Preceded by: Renaud Dutreil
- Succeeded by: Valérie Beauvais

Personal details
- Born: 30 April 1975 (age 50)
- Party: HOR (since 2021); LFA (since 2017)
- Other political affiliations: DL (1998–2002); UMP (2002–2015); LR (2015–2021)

Arnaud Robinet (born 30 April 1975) is a French politician of Horizons. Since 2014, he has served as mayor of Reims. From 2008 to 2017, he was a member of the National Assembly for Marne's 1st constituency. In 2022, he was elected president of the Hospital Federation of France.
