= Arrondissements of the Marne department =

List of subdivisions of the Marne department in France

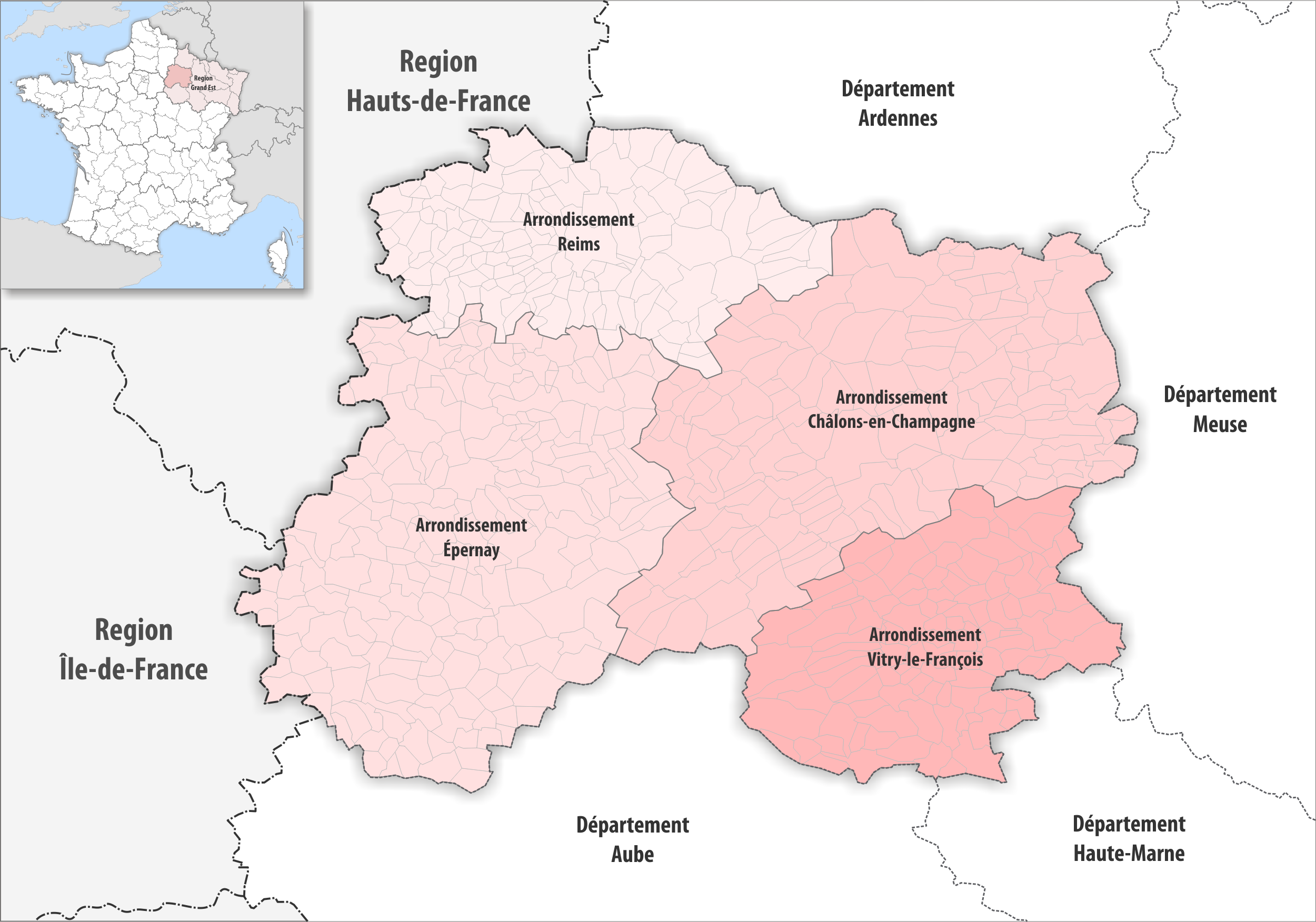
Map of arrondissements of the Marne department.

The 4 arrondissements of the Marne department are:

1. Arrondissement of Châlons-en-Champagne, (prefecture of the Marne department: Châlons-en-Champagne) with 150 communes. The population of the arrondissement was 107,923 in 2021.
2. Arrondissement of Épernay, (subprefecture: Épernay) with 210 communes. The population of the arrondissement was 116,465 in 2021.
3. Arrondissement of Reims, (subprefecture: Reims) with 143 communes. The population of the arrondissement was 297,068 in 2021.
4. Arrondissement of Vitry-le-François, (subprefecture: Vitry-le-François) with 110 communes. The population of the arrondissement was 43,836 in 2021.

== History ==
In 1800, the arrondissements of Châlons-sur-Marne, Épernay, Reims, Sainte-Menehould and Vitry-le-François were established. The arrondissement of Sainte-Menehould was disbanded in 1926, and restored in 1940. In January 2006, the arrondissement of Épernay absorbed the canton of Ay from the arrondissement of Reims.

The borders of the arrondissements of Marne were modified in April 2017:

- 23 communes from the arrondissement of Châlons-en-Champagne to the arrondissement of Épernay
- two communes from the arrondissement of Châlons-en-Champagne to the arrondissement of Reims
- four communes from the arrondissement of Épernay to the arrondissement of Châlons-en-Champagne
- one commune from the arrondissement of Reims to the arrondissement of Châlons-en-Champagne
- 13 communes from the arrondissement of Reims to the arrondissement of Épernay
- all 67 communes of the former arrondissement of Sainte-Menehould to the arrondissement of Châlons-en-Champagne
- three communes from the arrondissement of Vitry-le-François to the arrondissement of Châlons-en-Champagne
