= Bernard Carton =

French politician (1948–2022)

Member of the French National Assembly
- In office 13 June 1988 – 1 April 1993
- Preceded by: Pierre Prouvost
- Succeeded by: Michel Ghysel
- Constituency: Nord's 7th constituency

Member of the General Council of Nord
- In office 25 March 1979 – 27 March 2011
- Preceded by: Pierre Prouvost
- Succeeded by: Mehdi Massrour
- Constituency: Canton of Roubaix-Est

Personal details
- Born: 14 January 1948 Roubaix, France
- Died: 12 May 2022 (aged 74) France
- Party: PS
- Education: Sciences Po

Bernard Carton (14 January 1948 – 12 May 2022) was a French politician of the Socialist Party (PS). He served in the General Council of Nord from 1979 to 2011, representing the Canton of Roubaix-Est. From 1988 to 1993, he represented Nord's 7th constituency in the National Assembly.

Beginning in 2007, he suffered from Alzheimer's disease. He died on 12 May 2022 in Lannoy.
