= Didier Julia =

French politician and philosopher

Member of the National Assembly for Seine-et-Marne's 2nd constituency
- In office 3 April 1967 – 17 June 2012
- Preceded by: Paul Séramy
- Succeeded by: Valérie Lacroute

Personal details
- Born: 18 February 1934 (age 92) Paris, France
- Party: RPR; UMP
- Education: Lycée Henri-IV
- Alma mater: University of Paris

Didier Julia (born 18 February 1934) is a French politician. He was in 2007 representing the Union for a Popular Movement (UMP) from Seine-et-Marne in the French National Assembly, a post he has held from 1967. He is mainly known for his interference in liberation operations of French hostages detained in Iraq following the US invasion in 2003.

Didier Julia is doctor of State in Literature, agrégé in philosophy and university professor. He is in the Gaullist political family, a member of the UMP. He has been elected deputy for Fontainebleau since 1967.

In 1998, he supported accepting the votes of the Front National in the regional Council of the Île-de-France region.

He is a member of the commission of Foreign Affairs. A long-time friend of the government of Saddam Hussein, especially of Tariq Aziz, he was the leader of the pro-Iraqi lobby in the National Assembly until the 2003 invasion of Iraq by the United States and their allies. He is also a member of groups promoting friendship toward Saudi Arabia, Cameroon, the United States, Iran, Palestine, Syria, Zambia.

Didier Julia is the French member of the National Assembly who hold the record for longevity by the number of terms and years, with Jean Tiberi and Jean-Pierre Soisson (both since 1968), 11 terms and 45 years in the Assembly since 1967. In 2011, he announced that he will not contested his seat again for the legislative elections of 2012.

== The Iraq hostage affairs ==
From 14 to 17 September 2002, in a context of growing tensions in the region, he went to Iraq with two other deputies of the UMP, Thierry Mariani and Éric Diard. The journey irritated President Jacques Chirac and Foreign affairs minister Dominique de Villepin, who called them "pieds nickelés" (a derogatory and mocking expression denoting incompetence and vanity). The three went back to Iraq in March 2003, just before war broke out.

On 30 September 2004, while French diplomacy had been trying to obtain the liberation of Georges Malbrunot and Christian Chesnot, two journalists held hostage by the Islamic Army in Iraq, he went to Damascus. Three days later, he stated that he had succeeded in liberating the hostages, thanks to his contacts all over the world (mainly former baathists, and the President of Ivory Coast Laurent Gbagbo, who provided support, including the Ivorian presidential plane). He later said that he had eventually failed in extremis, and went back to France on 4 October, where the press and the political circles called him and his team "pieds nickelés" again. The executive sought to distance itself from Julia, describing his actions as a "private initiative", though it had initially given some support to Julia by facilitating his entry into Syria.

The Figaro, employer of one of the hostages, called them "dangerous amateurs", and the government mentioned a "nefarious superchery". Didier Julia responded on Europe 1 and TF1 by stating that the French diplomacy was totally lost, and said that he was bashed as a scapegoat for their failure. The "Julia Affair" begun, resulting in the arrest of Philippe Brett and Philippe Evano. Along with Dider Julia, they were put under judicial investigation for "conspiracy with foreign powers". Some commentators pointed out that this prosecution could be a smart move by the government to avoid an embarrassing parliamentary investigation into the matter – since Parliament regulations prohibit investigating a case that is already investigated by justice; the judicial case would end nowhere and embarrassing revelations would not happen. (Le Canard Enchaîné)

On 21 December, the hostages were liberated by the DGSE, which said to have proceeded to whole affair. The next day, Georges Malbrunot, arrived in France and qualified Julia and his friends of "imposters" and "mythomanes" who put their lives into jeopardy. Didier Julia accused foreign minister Michel Barnier of influencing the hostages during the four-hour flight from Iraq. Barnier himself, asked on TF1 whether Julia could be excluded from the UMP, said that this would be "a minimum".

On 1 March 2005, a video footage of Florence Aubenas, a French journalist of Libération taken hostage on 5 January 2005, was found in Iraq. Aubenas asks "Monsieur Julia" to rescue her. Didier Julia said that he was ready to offer his services to the government if sanctions taken against him and his friends were dropped. The French foreign minister stated that the case would be processed by regular services and that the investigation on Julia would continue (Florence Aubenas was freed on 11 June).

== Mandates ==
- 2 April 1967 – 30 May 1968 : Deputy
- 11 July 1968 – 1 April 1973 : Deputy
- 3 April 1973 – 1 April 1978 : Deputy
- 3 April 1978 – 22 May 1981 : Deputy
- 2 July 1981 – 1 April 1986 : Deputy
- 17 March 1986 – 22 March 1992 : Vice-President of the Regional Council of Île-de-France
- 2 April 1986 – 14 May 1988 : Deputy
- 6 June 1988 – 1 April 1993 : Deputy
- 23 March 1992 – 15 March 1998 : Vice-President of the Regional Council of Île-de-France
- 2 April 1993 – 21 April 1997 : Deputy
- 1 June 1997 – 18 June 2002 : Deputy
- 16 June 2002 – 18 June 2007 : Deputy
- 20 June 2007 – 17 June 2012 : Deputy
- Member of the Regional Council of Île-de-France
