= Valérie Lacroute =

French politician

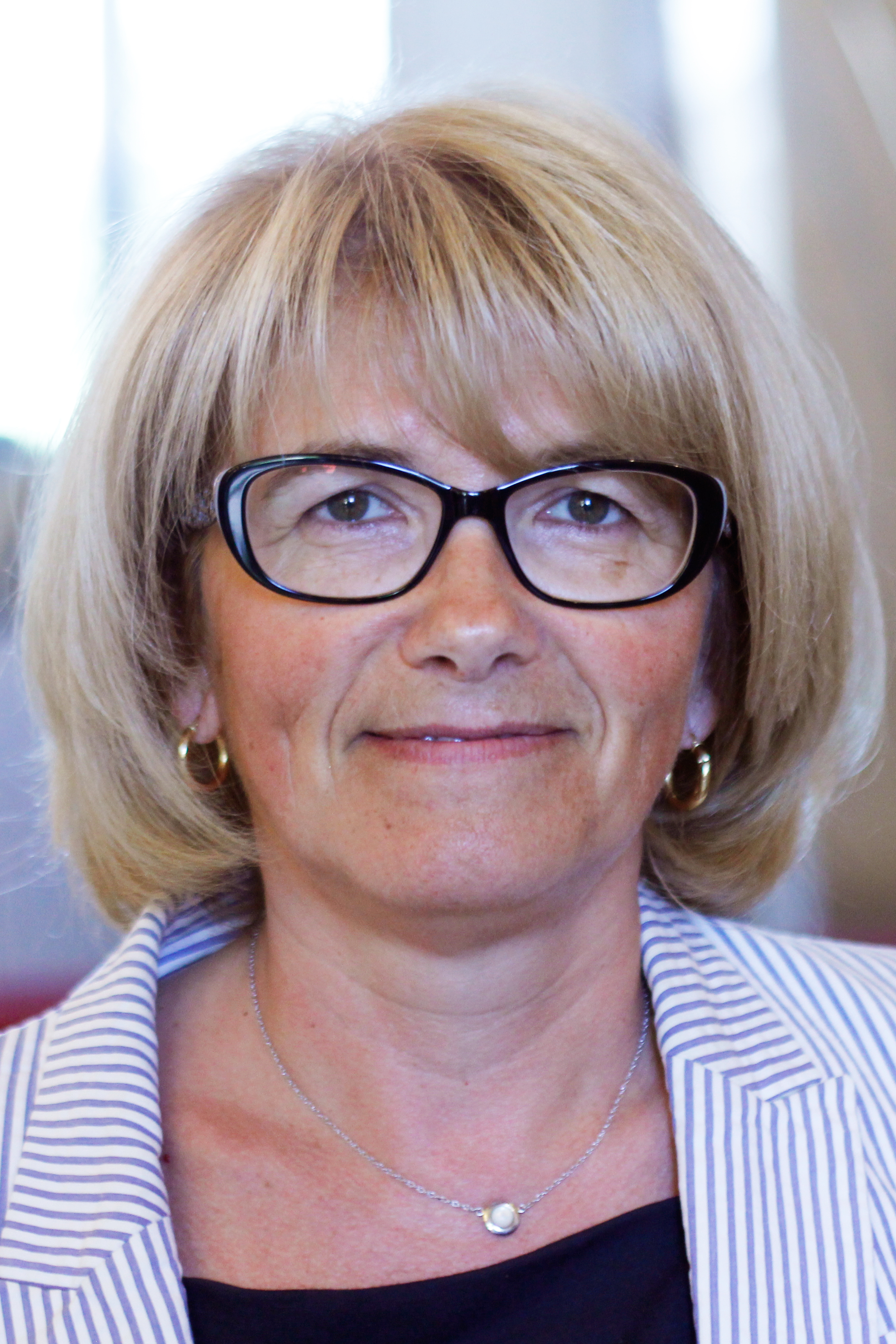
- Valérie Lacroute in 2017

Mayor of Nemours
- Incumbent
- Assumed office 25 May 2020
- Preceded by: Anne-Marie Marchand
- In office 21 March 2008 – 17 July 2017
- Preceded by: Jean-Pierre Béranger
- Succeeded by: Anne-Marie Marchand

Member of the National Assembly for Seine-et-Marne's 2nd constituency
- In office 20 June 2012 – 22 June 2020
- Preceded by: Didier Julia
- Succeeded by: Sylvie Bouchet Bellecourt

Personal details
- Born: 29 October 1965 (age 60) Chalon-sur-Saône, France
- Party: The Republicans

Valérie Lacroute (born 29 October 1965) is a French politician who represented Seine-et-Marne's 2nd constituency in the National Assembly of France from 2012 to 2020. She left Parliament in 2020 due to an accumulation of mandates and was replaced by her substitute Sylvie Bouchet Bellecourt.
