= Lise Magnier =

French politician

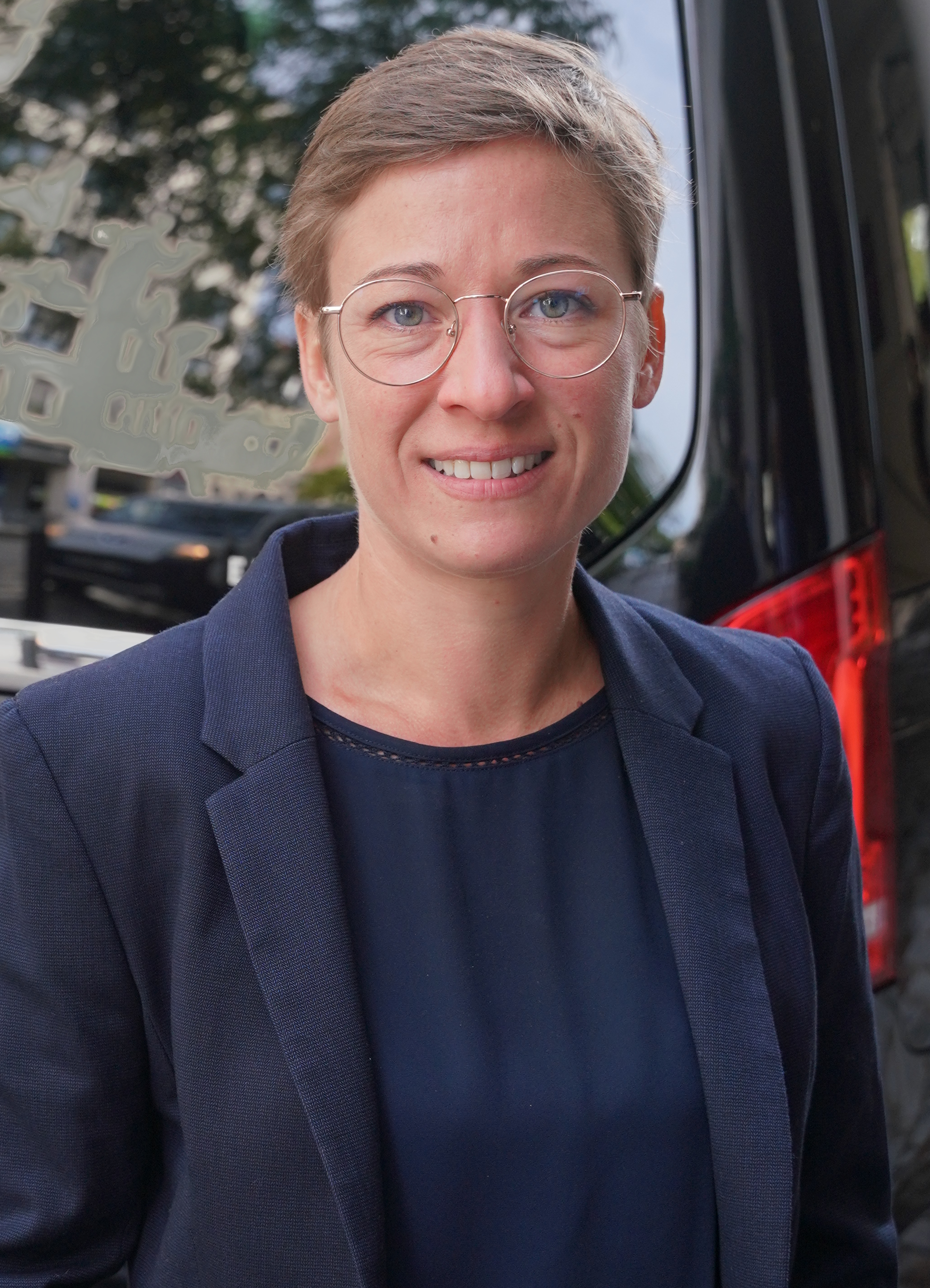

Member of the National Assembly for Marne's 4th constituency
- Incumbent
- Assumed office 21 June 2017
- Preceded by: Benoist Apparu

Personal details
- Born: 31 December 1984 (age 41) Châlons-en-Champagne, France
- Party: Horizons
- Other political affiliations: The Republicans (2015-2017); Agir (2017-2022)
- Education: University of Lille

Lise Magnier (born 31 December 1984) is a French politician who has represented Marne's 4th constituency in the National Assembly of France since 2017.

== Political career ==
Magnier was elected in Marne's 4th constituency as a Republican at the 2017 legislative election.

In November 2017, Magnier joined the new Agir party. In 2022, she joined Horizons, and was re-elected in the 2022 French legislative election with the support from Ensemble Citoyens.
