= Francis Vercamer =

French politician (born 1958)

Francis Vercamer (born 10 May 1958 in Lille, Nord) is a French politician of the Union of Democrats and Independents (as part of the Centrists) who served as a member of the National Assembly from 2002 until 2020, representing the Nord department, He is also the mayor of Hem, Nord.

== Political career ==
During his time in parliament, Vercamer served on the Committee on Cultural Affairs (2002-2010), the Committee on Social Affairs (2010-2020), and the Committee on European Affairs (2009-2012).
