= Frédéric Valletoux =

French journalist and politician

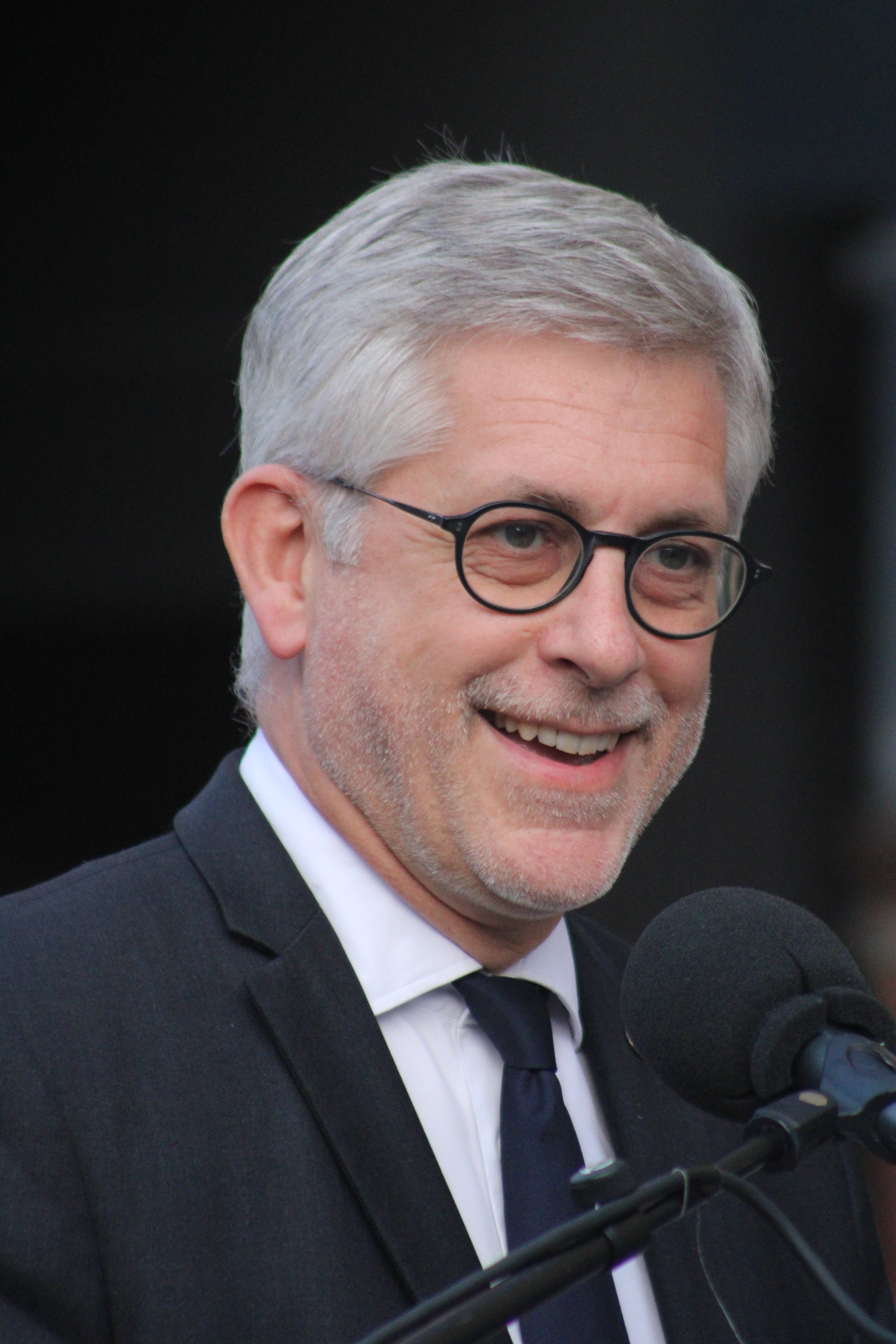
- Frédéric Valletoux giving a speech during the inauguration of Étape Square, in Fontainebleau, 22 October 2022.
- Born: Frédéric Claude Henri René Valletoux; 23 August 1966
- Occupation: Journalist (1990–), politician (2001–), anciens cadres,
- Awards: Chevalier des Arts et des Lettres (2011–)
- Website: http://www.valletoux.fr/

- Position held: member of the regional council of Île-de-France (2015–), Mayor of Fontainebleau (2014–2020), (2014–), municipal councillor of Fontainebleau (2014–2020), Mayor of Fontainebleau (2020–), municipal councillor of Fontainebleau (2020–), president (2011–), deputy (2024–)

Frédéric Valletoux (French pronunciation: [fʁedeʁik valtu]; born 23 August 1966) is a French journalist and politician of the Horizons party who has been serving as minister delegate in charge of Health and Prevention in the government of Prime Minister Gabriel Attal since February 2024.

== Political career ==
Valletoux served as Mayor of Fontainebleau from 2005 to 2022 and as regional councilor of Île-de-France since March 2010, he also chaired the Hospital Federation of France from 2011 to 2022.

In 2016, Valletoux left the Republicans and instead joined Agir.

Valletoux has been a member of the National Assembly since 2022. In parliament, he served on the Committee on Social Affairs. In addition to his committee assignments, he was a member of the French delegation to the Parliamentary Assembly of the Council of Europe 2022 to 2023.

In 2024, Valletoux was appointed Minister Delegate in charge of Health and Prevention in the Attal government.
