= Renaud Dutreil =

French government official

Minister of Civil Service
- In office 2004–2005
- President: Jacques Chirac
- Prime Minister: Jean-Pierre Raffarin
- Preceded by: Jean-Paul Delevoye
- Succeeded by: Christian Jacob

Personal details
- Born: 12 June 1960 (age 66) Chambéry, France
- Party: UMP
- Education: École normale supérieure Sciences Po, ÉNA

Renaud Dutreil (born 12 June 1960) is a French government official. He was Lauréat du Concours Général de Philosophie in 1978.

Dutreil served in the highest offices of French government for over fifteen years prior to his joining LVMH. His ministerial appointments included Minister of Small & Medium-Sized Businesses, Commerce, Crafts and Liberal Professions (2005–2007), Minister of the Civil Service and State Reform (2004–2005) and Secretary of State for Small & Medium-Sized Businesses, Commerce, Crafts and Liberal Professions (2002–2004). He was a Member of Parliament from 1994–2008 and of the French Council of State (Supreme Court for Public Law) from 1989 to 1992. He is currently non serving Maître des Requêtes au Conseil d'Etat, where he was admitted in 1989 with rank 1st.

== Education ==
Dutreil is a graduate of the Paris Institute of Political Sciences, École Normale Supérieure and École Nationale d'Administration in Paris.

== Career ==
=== 2002 ===
In 2002, he was the first President and founder of the Union pour un Mouvement Populaire, which is the currently leading political party in France. As Minister in the French government, he is known for the "Dutreil Acts", which have modernized the French tax system, the distribution system, the professional education system and encouraged a pro-entrepreneurial culture and environment in France

=== 2003 ===
A strong advocate of national artisanal and Luxury traditions, Dutreil co-authored among other books Le Geste et La Parole des Métiers d'Art, an important reference work on the subject. In 2003, he created a Government sponsored label, "Entreprise du Patrimoine vivant" (Living Heritage Companies) which has been granted to more than 600 French companies selected for their exceptional know how and heritage.

=== 2005 ===
Dutreil argued strongly for 'fonctions régaliennes' in the French administration (army, police, justice and heritage) to be reserved for French citizens (i.e. not open to other European citizens) (speech at the Ecole Normale Supérieure, 2005).

=== 2008-2009 ===
He is member of the Advisory Board of L Capital, a Private Equity fund part of LVMH.

He has developed an expertise in Brand development and management and initiated, during the crisis in 2008 and 2009, a strategic focus of the brands on the values of Artisanship, heritage and narrative communication, exclusive store experience and controlled distribution, which are now the core of the Luxury marketing and distribution strategies. He has also developed a strong network in Asia (China and India) and Brazil. As a "multi cultural" leader, familiar with distribution and marketing in the emerging markets as well as in Europe and the US, Dutreil believes growth in consumer goods will more and more come from the "globalization of exception", implying a double focus on brand identity as well as global distribution, executed by multinational management teams.

Dutreil is a Trustee of Museum of Arts and Design, New York City; Member of the Board of New School and of Parsons School of Design; Member of the Board of Maison Française Columbia University; Member of Partnership for New York; he is the Chairman of Friends of Institut des Hautes Etudes Scientifiques, a French institute supporting advanced research in mathematics and theoretical physics.

Dutreil is Knight of the Legion of Honour.
