= Marc Francina =

French politician

Marc Francina (2 February 1948 in Évian-les-Bains – 26 October 2018) was a member of the National Assembly of France. He represented the Haute-Savoie department, and was a member of the Union for a Popular Movement. Prior to his political career Francina worked as a bank clerk for a regional bank.
