= Horizons (France) =

- Leader: Édouard Philippe
- General Secretary: Christophe Béchu
- Founder: Édouard Philippe
- Founded: 9 October 2021; 5 years ago
- Split from: The Republicans; La République En Marche!
- Headquarters: 60, rue François-Ier; 75008 Paris
- Ideology: Liberal conservatism; Economic liberalism; Pro-Europeanism
- Political position: Centre-right
- National affiliation: Ensemble
- European Parliament group: Renew Europe
- Colours: Blue; White
- National Assembly: 34 / 577
- Senate: 11 / 348
- European Parliament: 2 / 81
- Communes with over 30,000 inhabitants: 14 / 279
- Presidency of regional councils: 1 / 17

Website
- horizonsleparti.fr

Horizons (French: [ɔʁizɔ̃]) is a centre-right political party in France founded in October 2021 by Édouard Philippe, at the time mayor of Le Havre and former Prime Minister of France.

The party was created with the purpose of attracting centre-right support for Emmanuel Macron for the 2022 French presidential election. It seeks to appeal to the secular and pro-European right, with a "social calling". Ahead of the 2022 legislative election, it formed a coalition with two other main centrist parties – Democratic Movement (MoDem) and La République En Marche! (LREM) – to coordinate which candidates it presents.

== Notable members ==
=== Members of Parliament ===
Elected in the 2022 French legislative election:

Constituency	Name		
Constituency	Name	Calvados's 3rd constituency	Jérémie Patrier-Leitus
Charente's 1st constituency	Thomas Mesnier		
Charente-Maritime's 5th constituency	Christophe Plassard		
Cher's 3rd constituency	Loïc Kervran		
Corse-du-Sud's 1st constituency	Laurent Marcangeli		
Eure-et-Loir's 3rd constituency	Luc Lamirault		
Indre's 1st constituency	François Jolivet		
Indre-et-Loire's 3rd constituency	Henri Alfandari		
Maine-et-Loire's 1st constituency	François Gernigon		
Marne's 1st constituency	Xavier Albertini		
Marne's 4th constituency	Lise Magnier		
Mayenne's 3rd constituency	Yannick Favennec		
Morbihan's 1st constituency	Anne Le Hénanff		
Nord's 7th constituency	Félicie Gérard		
Bas-Rhin's 8th constituency	Stéphanie Kochert		
Haut-Rhin's 3rd constituency	Didier Lemaire		
Saône-et-Loire's 5th constituency	Louis Margueritte		
Haute-Savoie's 5th constituency	Anne-Cécile Violland		
Seine-Maritime's 7th constituency	Agnès Firmin-Le Bodo		
Seine-Maritime's 9th constituency	Marie-Agnès Poussier-Winsback		
Seine-et-Marne's 2nd constituency	Frédéric Valletoux		
Vendée's 2nd constituency	Béatrice Bellamy		
Yonne's 2nd constituency	André Villiers		
Val d'Oise's 4th constituency	Naïma Moutchou		

=== Mayors and MEPs ===
- Arnaud Robinet, mayor of Reims
- Édouard Philippe, mayor of Le Havre and founder and leader of the party
- Hubert Falco, mayor of Toulon
- Christian Estrosi, mayor of Nice
- Christophe Béchu, mayor of Angers and general secretary of the party
- Delphine Bürkli, mayor of the 9th arrondissement of Paris
- Gilles Boyer, member of the European Parliament
- Laurent Marcangeli, mayor of Ajaccio

== Election results ==
=== Presidential ===
Election year	Candidate	1st round			2nd round			Result
Election year	Candidate	Votes	%	Rank	Votes	%	Rank	Result
2022	Supported Emmanuel Macron							Won

=== National Assembly ===
Election	Leader	Votes (first round)		Seats		Result
Election	Leader	No.	%	No.	±	Result
2022	Édouard Philippe	648,312	2.85	30 / 577	▲30	Presidential minority (under Ensemble)
2024	Édouard Philippe	1,135,647	3.54	26 / 577	▼4	Presidential minority (under Ensemble)

=== European Parliament ===
Election	Leader	Votes	%	Seats	+/−	EP Group
2024 (Note: Run as part of the Ensemble coalition.)	Édouard Philippe	3,589,114	14.56 (#2)	2 / 81	New	RE
