= Results of the 2024 French legislative election in Seine-Saint-Denis =

Following the first round of the 2024 French legislative election on 30 June 2024, runoff elections in each constituency where no candidate received a vote share greater than 50 percent were scheduled for 7 July. Candidates permitted to stand in the runoff elections needed to either come in first or second place in the first round or achieve more than 12.5 percent of the votes of the entire electorate (as opposed to 12.5 percent of the vote share due to low turnout).

== Seine-Saint-Denis ==
=== 1st constituency ===
Candidate	Party or alliance		Votes	%
Éric Coquerel	New Popular Front	La France Insoumise	27,298	65.28
Jean-Pierre Monfils	Ensemble	Renaissance	6,185	14.79
Julien Grazioli	National Rally		4,803	11.49
François Peguillet	The Republicans		1,208	2.89
Gersende Le Maire	Ecologists	Independent	878	2.10
Nabil Bouard	Miscellaneous right	Independent	618	1.48
Alain Aubryd	Far-left	Lutte Ouvrière	543	1.30
Paul Uhalde	Far-left	Miscellaneous left	204	0.49
Emmanuel Bilongo Mambweni	Independent		62	0.15
Gaëll Falisz	Far-left	Independent	18	0.04
Total			41,817	100.00
Valid votes			41,817	98.18
Invalid votes			290	0.68
Blank votes			484	1.14
Total votes			42,591	100.00
Registered voters/turnout			69,916	60.92

=== 2nd constituency ===
Candidate	Party or alliance		Votes	%
Stéphane Peu	New Popular Front	Communist Party	22,055	71.80
Luc Colomas	National Rally		3,628	11.81
Samantha Uk	Ensemble	Democratic Movement	2,282	7.43
Anasse Kazib	Far-left	Independent	1,128	3.67
Louis-Auxile Maillard	The Republicans		798	2.60
Agnès Renaud	Far-left	Lutte Ouvrière	491	1.60
Maki Théa Marquand	Ecologists	Independent	334	1.09
Total			30,716	100.00
Valid votes			30,716	97.74
Invalid votes			257	0.82
Blank votes			453	1.44
Total votes			31,426	100.00
Registered voters/turnout			56,882	55.25

=== 3rd constituency ===
Candidate	Party or alliance		First round		Second round	
Candidate	Party or alliance		Votes	%	Votes	%
Thomas Portes	New Popular Front	La France Insoumise	20,648	41.68	30,688	69.71
Denis Cretin-Gielly	National Rally		10,539	21.28	13,335	30.29
Eric Allemon	Miscellaneous right	Union of Democrats and Independents	5,681	11.47		
Patrice Anato	Miscellaneous centre	Centrist Alliance	5,521	11.15		
Stéphanie Richard	Miscellaneous centre	Independent	2,710	5.47		
Djénéba Diaby	Miscellaneous centre	Independent	2,452	4.95		
Maxence Buttey	Miscellaneous right	Independent	1,146	2.31		
Maëlle Gaucherand	Far-left	Lutte Ouvrière	451	0.91		
Sarah Astrid Dacko	Independent		388	0.78		
Gaspard Nicolle	Far-left	Independent	1	0.00		
Total			49,537	100.00	44,023	100.00
Valid votes			49,537	97.69	44,023	89.65
Invalid votes			386	0.76	1,018	2.07
Blank votes			785	1.55	4,063	8.27
Total votes			50,708	100.00	49,104	100.00
Registered voters/turnout			77,478	65.45	77,502	63.36

=== 4th constituency ===
Candidate	Party or alliance		First round		Second round	
Candidate	Party or alliance		Votes	%	Votes	%
Soumya Bourouaha	New Popular Front	Communist Party	15,760	44.52	19,486	69.98
Mohamed Awad	La France Insoumise (Note: Dissident who ran without the support of the New Popular Front)		8,462	23.90	8,361	30.02
Colette Lévêque	National Rally		5,839	16.49		
Hamza Rabehi	Ensemble	Renaissance	2,429	6.86		
Micaël Vaz	The Republicans		1,982	5.60		
Marlène Ley	Far-left	Lutte Ouvrière	344	0.97		
Amirdine Farouk	Independent		335	0.95		
Sonia Attig	Miscellaneous left	Independent	105	0.30		
Omar Mirali	Independent		102	0.29		
Matthieu Belin	Far-left	Independent	25	0.07		
Virginie Pottier	Miscellaneous right	Independent	16	0.05		
Total			35,399	100.00	27,847	100.00
Valid votes			35,399	96.98	27,847	87.60
Invalid votes			291	0.80	713	2.24
Blank votes			811	2.22	3,227	10.15
Total votes			36,501	100.00	31,787	100.00
Registered voters/turnout			67,437	54.13	67,468	47.11

=== 5th constituency ===
Candidate	Party or alliance		First round		Second round	
Candidate	Party or alliance		Votes	%	Votes	%
Aly Diouara	New Popular Front	La Seine Saint-Denis au Cœur !	12,141	33.10	20,511	60.55
Aude Lagarde	Ensemble	Union of Democrats and Independents	9,006	24.56	13,362	39.45
Raquel Garrido	Miscellaneous left	La France Insoumise (Note: Dissident who ran without the support of the New Popular Front) (Note: Following the election, her and other LFI dissidents would form a new party, L'Après)	8,672	23.65		
Eric Kozelko	National Rally		6,382	17.40		
Rodolphe Feger	Far-left	Lutte Ouvrière	359	0.98		
Markeins Pierre	Miscellaneous left	Independent	115	0.31		
Tatiana Boutignon	Independent		0	0.00		
Hélène Ballouhey	Far-left	Independent	0	0.00		
Total			36,675	100.00	33,873	100.00
Valid votes			36,675	97.44	33,873	94.47
Invalid votes			369	0.98	605	1.69
Blank votes			596	1.58	1,378	3.84
Total votes			37,640	100.00	35,856	100.00
Registered voters/turnout			65,908	57.11	65,938	54.38

=== 6th constituency ===
Candidate	Party or alliance		Votes	%
Bastien Lachaud	New Popular Front	La France Insoumise	25,777	71.68
Nathalie Sack	Ensemble	Union of Democrats and Independents	5,014	13.94
Nacéra Salhaoui	National Rally		4,175	11.61
Nathalie Arthaud	Far-left	Lutte Ouvrière	996	2.77
Total			35,962	100.00
Valid votes			35,962	97.89
Invalid votes			257	0.70
Blank votes			518	1.41
Total votes			36,737	100.00
Registered voters/turnout			60,823	60.40

=== 7th constituency ===
Candidate	Party or alliance		First round		Second round	
Candidate	Party or alliance		Votes	%	Votes	%
Alexis Corbière	Miscellaneous left	La France Insoumise (Note: Dissident who ran without the support of the New Popular Front) (Note: Following the election, him and other LFI dissidents would form a new party, L'Après)	21,802	40.19	25,033	57.16
Sabrina Ali-Benali	New Popular Front	La France Insoumise	19,740	36.39	18,759	42.84
Pauline Breteau	Ensemble	Horizons	5,458	10.06		
Françoise Trova	National Rally		5,254	9.68		
Antoine Toche	Miscellaneous right	Independent	713	1.31		
Eric Verhaeghe	Miscellaneous centre	Independent	518	0.95		
Aurélie Jochaud	Far-left	Lutte Ouvrière	344	0.63		
Yannick Duterte	Far-left	Independent	180	0.33		
Elsa Caudron	Far-left	Independent	165	0.30		
Sébastien Atlani	Independent		78	0.14		
Total			54,252	100.00	43,792	100.00
Valid votes			54,252	98.03	43,792	91.75
Invalid votes			267	0.48	664	1.39
Blank votes			824	1.49	3,273	6.86
Total votes			55,343	100.00	47,729	100.00
Registered voters/turnout			83,457	66.31	83,486	57.17

=== 8th constituency ===
Candidate	Party or alliance		First round		Second round	
Candidate	Party or alliance		Votes	%	Votes	%
Fatiha Keloua Hachi	New Popular Front	Socialist Party	19,193	49.30	24,476	68.41
Sébastien Jolivet	National Rally		9,291	23.86	11,301	31.59
Didier Fort	Miscellaneous right	Independent	5,350	13.74		
Franck Yonboue	The Republicans		3,844	9.87		
Sylvio Valente	Reconquête		634	1.63		
Grégory Tobeilem	Far-left	Lutte Ouvrière	509	1.31		
Ntela Bardai	Far-right	Independent	86	0.22		
Hélène Dupuy	Far-left	Independent	27	0.07		
Total			38,934	100.00	35,777	100.00
Valid votes			38,934	97.07	35,777	92.22
Invalid votes			201	0.50	377	0.97
Blank votes			973	2.43	2,643	6.81
Total votes			40,108	100.00	38,797	100.00
Registered voters/turnout			62,716	63.95	62,734	61.84

=== 9th constituency ===
Candidate	Party or alliance		Votes	%
Aurélie Trouvé	New Popular Front	La France Insoumise	29,935	63.19
Clara Bourassin	National Rally		7,156	15.11
Manon Chaumette	Ensemble	Democratic Movement	7,119	15.03
Robenson Pierre	The Republicans		2,073	4.38
Jean-Paul Burot	Far-left	Lutte Ouvrière	681	1.44
Christel Keiser	Far-left	Independent	407	0.86
Total			47,371	100.00
Valid votes			47,371	97.90
Invalid votes			319	0.66
Blank votes			696	1.44
Total votes			48,386	100.00
Registered voters/turnout			76,227	63.48

=== 10th constituency ===
Candidate	Party or alliance		Votes	%
Nadège Abomangoli	New Popular Front	La France Insoumise	21,282	52.60
Monique Trova	National Rally		7,409	18.31
Alain Ramadier	The Republicans		7,129	17.62
Martial Meyongo Amougou	Ensemble	Miscellaneous centre	3,321	8.21
Gaëtan Minardi	Far-left	Lutte Ouvrière	563	1.39
Praince Germain Loubota	Reconquête		381	0.94
Ahmed El Ouafi	Independent		291	0.72
Amèle Bentahar	Independent		84	0.21
Total			40,460	100.00
Valid votes			40,460	97.79
Invalid votes			272	0.66
Blank votes			643	1.55
Total votes			41,375	100.00
Registered voters/turnout			67,983	60.86

=== 11th constituency ===
Candidate	Party or alliance		Votes	%
Clémentine Autain	New Popular Front	La France Insoumise	22,209	62.65
Renée Joly	National Rally		6,694	18.88
Fayza Basini	Ensemble	Miscellaneous centre	3,702	10.44
Max Maran	The Republicans		1,658	4.68
Kahina Näit-Kaci	Miscellaneous right	Union of Democrats and Independents (Note: Dissident who ran without the support of Ensemble)	801	2.26
Charlotte Séchet	Far-left	Lutte Ouvrière	388	1.09
Lucien Belzane	Far-left	Independent	0	0.00
Total			35,452	100.00
Valid votes			35,452	97.59
Invalid votes			306	0.84
Blank votes			570	1.57
Total votes			36,328	100.00
Registered voters/turnout			64,671	56.17

=== 12th constituency ===
Candidate	Party or alliance		First round		Second round	
Candidate	Party or alliance		Votes	%	Votes	%
Jérôme Legavre	New Popular Front	Independent Workers' Party	17,566	45.11	22,974	64.59
Jean-François Perier	National Rally		10,140	26.04	12,596	35.41
Xavier Lemoine	Miscellaneous right	Independent	5,016	12.88		
Virginie Roitman	Ensemble	Horizons	4,893	12.57		
Francis Dijos	Reconquête		546	1.40		
Amal Aissaoui	Far-left	Lutte Ouvrière	503	1.29		
Dominique Vincenot	Far-left	Independent	273	0.70		
Serjan Kirma	Independent		0	0.00		
Didier Martinot	Far-left	Independent	0	0.00		
Total			38,937	100.00	35,570	100.00
Valid votes			38,937	97.72	35,570	91.64
Invalid votes			260	0.65	648	1.67
Blank votes			650	1.63	2,596	6.69
Total votes			39,847	100.00	38,814	100.00
Registered voters/turnout			66,375	60.03	66,403	58.45
