= Raquel Garrido =

French-Chilean politician (born 1974)

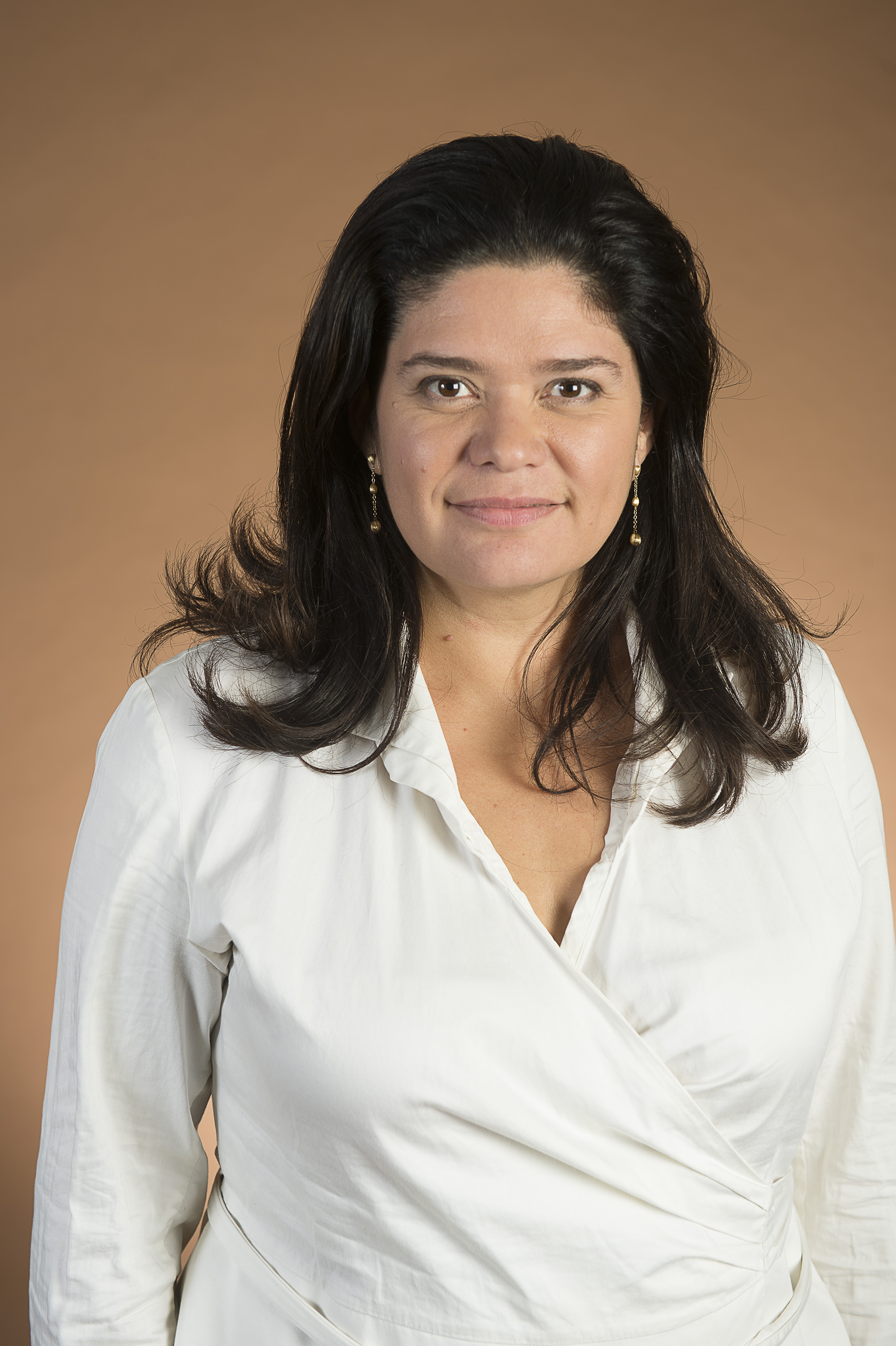
- Raquel Garrido in 2015

Member of the National Assembly for Seine-Saint-Denis's 5th constituency
- In office 22 June 2022 – 9 June 2024
- Preceded by: Jean-Christophe Lagarde
- Succeeded by: Aly Diouara

Personal details
- Born: 23 April 1974 (age 51) Valparaíso, Chile
- Party: L'Après (2024–present)
- Other political affiliations: Socialist Party (1993–2008); Left Party (2008–present); La France Insoumise (2016–2017, 2020–2024)
- Spouse: Alexis Corbière

Raquel Garrido (Spanish pronunciation: [raˈkel ɣaˈriðo]; born 23 April 1974) is a French-Chilean politician. Representing La France Insoumise (LFI), she was elected to the National Assembly for Seine-Saint-Denis's 5th constituency in the 2022 French legislative election. Running as a dissident without the endorsement of the New Popular Front (NPF), she reached the second round of the 2024 French legislative election and then withdrew.

== Biography ==
=== Early life ===
Garrido was born in Valparaíso, Chile. She was born seven months after Augusto Pinochet's right-wing coup d'état and her left-wing parents were interned. The family were exiled and lived in Toronto before settling in Marly-le-Roi in Yvelines, Île-de-France.

Garrido became vice president of SOS Racisme when she was 22. As a student activist in the Union nationale des étudiants de France – Indépendante et démocratique, she met Alexis Corbière, with whom she had three daughters.

=== Early political career ===
During the 2008 financial crisis, Garrido left the Socialist Party for Jean-Luc Mélenchon's new Left Party. She cited the financial crisis and the success of new leftist parties in Latin America as a reason to abandon the social democratic former party. In the 2012 French legislative election, she stood in the Second constituency for French residents overseas (Latin America and the Caribbean), coming fourth with 8.6% of the vote.

Garrido became spokesperson of Mélenchon's new La France Insoumise (LFI) in 2017 but left this role the same year due to questions of impartiality over her role as a political pundit on Les Terriens du dimanche ! on C8. She said that she would opt for the punditry, as the party's size would provide a replacement, while there were few left-wing commentators on television. She and Corbière were also subject to scrutiny over continuing to live in public housing in the city of Paris while he represented a constituency in nearby Seine-Saint-Denis and their household income was over the limit; they were ordered to leave by the city council.

=== Member of the National Assembly ===
In the 2022 French legislative election, Garrido ran for LFI within the New Ecological and Social People's Union (NUPES) in Seine-Saint-Denis's 5th constituency. She defeated 20-year incumbent Jean-Christophe Lagarde of the Union of Democrats and Independents by 53.5% to 46.5% in the run-off.

In November 2023, Garrido was suspended by LFI for four months for allegedly spreading false information about its members. She had criticised Mélenchon's leadership, and criticised her punishment as being exactly that given by the party to its former coordinator Adrien Quatennens for a domestic violence conviction.

In the 2024 French legislative election, Garrido was one of four LFI dissidents purged by LFI but nonetheless supported by all the other parties of the Nouveau Front Populaire (NFP) coalition, who reached the second round; one of the others was her husband. She came third in the first round, with 23.7% of the vote, behind Aly Diouara of the La France Insoumise, and Jean-Christophe Lagarde's wife Aude (also UDI). She withdrew from the race, allowing Diouara to win the run-off. After the election, the dissidents from LFI established L'Après.

== Television ==
=== Editor, commentator ===
- 2017-2019 : Les Terriens du dimanche! (on C8)
- 2019-2021 : Balance ton post! (on C8)
- Since 2025 : Face à face (on LCI)

=== Other ===
1. Les Traitres (The Traitors) season 4, as a faithful

== Summary of election results ==
=== Legislative elections ===
Year	Party	Constituency	1st round			2nd round			Result
Year	Party	Constituency	Votes	%	Ranking	Votes	%	Ranking	Result
2012	FG	2e des Français établis hors de France (Second French legislative constituency for citizens abroad)	990	8.60	4th				Defeated
2022	LFI (NUPES)	5e de la Seine-Saint-Denis (Seine-Saint-Denis's 5th constituency)	8 786	37.90	1st	13 107	53.50	1st	Elected
2024	LFI diss.	5e de la Seine-Saint-Denis (Seine-Saint-Denis's 5th constituency)	8 672	23.65	3rd	Withdrawn			Defeated

== High-profile legal cases, as a lawyer ==
- Polling case (she was the lawyer for Jean-Luc Mélenchon against the Commission nationale des sondages and Harris Interactive, Mélenchon wanted to make the manner in which the raw data from its polls was restated transparent).
- 'Fake leaflets' case, by Hénin-Beaumont, aimed at Jean-Luc Mélenchon (a suit against Marine Le Pen, the FN having produced and distributed a fake leaflet for the Front de gauche with communitarianism content). Garrido herself was taken to court by Marine Le Pen who accused her of having described Le Pen as a 'criminal' in the context of the case. Marine Le Pen lost her trial, as well as her appeal.
- 'Fascist' case (Jean-Luc Mélenchon, having described Marine Le Pen as a 'fascist', was accused of 'public insult').
- Míkis Theodorákis case (Jean-Luc Mélenchon pressed charges against Jean-François Copé, Nathalie Kosciusko-Morizet and Alain Juppé, who accused him of having 'anti-semitic contacts').
- Aslangul case (Claudio Calfuquir against Charles Aslangul).
- Case of Maryline Mélenchon against Christian Schoettl, the mayor of Janvry.
- Société générale case (Jean-Luc Mélenchon against the Société générale).
- 'Apprentice dictator' case (Gilles Wobedo against Fabien Engelmann, FN mayor of Hayange).

== Controversies ==
=== Unpaid contributions ===
According to an article on 4 October 2017 in Canard enchaîné, during six years as a lawyer, she allegedly failed to pay her contributions to the Caisse nationale des barreaux français (CNBF), meaning she would be liable for €32,215. The paper also claimed that she had not been paying her contributions to the ordre des avocats de Paris (Paris Bar Association) for the past year. But the CNBF condemned this 'inaccurate information', and according to the Paris Bar, she had resolved this matter with them on 20 September 2017 with a schedule to settle the payments in arrears. The article by the Canard enchaîné, which received much attention, was made the subject of a defamation suit, by Garrido. Her legal action was dismissed in 2023, the judges noting, according to the Canard enchainé, that the lawyer was 'indeed liable for unpaid contributions and for a debt to the Paris Bar.

=== HLM housing until 2017 ===
In October 2017, she was the subject of a new controversy about the fact that she lived in HLM (social housing) with her partner Alexis Corbière. The couple eventually left that residence and moved to Alexis Corbière's constituency, where he was elected as a deputy in June 2017. They had occupied the residence legally and without receiving special treatment from 2000 to 2017.

=== Financial aid for home renovations ===
In October 2018, Le Canard enchaîné revealed that Raquel Garrido and her partner Alexis Corbière had benefited from assistance from the Agence nationale de l'habitat to pay for the renovation works carried out on their house in Bagnolet. The couple received this aid granted under means-testing to lower-income owner-occupiers while one was a TV commentator and the other was a deputy.

=== Claims of anti-semitism ===
In January 2020, during a broadcast of Balance ton post<span typeof="mw:DisplaySpace" id="mwAbw">&nbsp;</span>!, in which she is a commentator, commented on the controversy on the practice of wearing a veil during school trips and claimed that if Jean-Michel Blanquer had been opposed to the wearing of the kippah on school trips, 'he would no longer be a minister'. Cyril Hanouna claimed that her words were anti-semitic and had implied that there was a Jewish lobby at the heart of the government.

=== Criticism for comments about terrorists ===
On 14 November 2021, Garrido was invited onto the platform BFM TV to comment on the anniversary of the November 2015 Paris attacks. She specifically criticised the remarks of Éric Zemmour (who accused François Hollande of having 'done nothing' to prevent the attacks in terms of border control and immigration), believing that 'the families have made immeasurable efforts to participate in the proceedings, to find the strength to tesity, to pay tribute to their dead, to find a path towards reconciliation, including with the terrorists themselves and those who are on trial'. The declaration caused an uproar in the media. She later acknowledged that 'the term reconciliation was poorly chosen'.

=== Altercation behind the scenes at Canal Factory ===
On 16 December 2021, Cyril Hanouna launched the political broadcast 'Face à Baba' on C8, with the goal of having the candidates for the 2022 presidential election and also commentators, supporters, analysts and other politicians and professions from all walks of life. Éric Zemmour was a guest on the first episode, and a tense exchange took place between Alexis Corbière and Stanislas Rigault, the president of the youth wing of Reconquête. After the broadcast, the altercation continued and the tone rose offstage. The altercation, which was filmed, shows the pair become aggressive towards Rigault. Garrido told him 'Sucking your boss's dick on TV, you think that's glorious [?]' and added 'bastard' then 'coward'. The video went viral on social media where the behaviour of Zemmour's opponents was criticised.

=== False accusations by Le Point magazine ===
In June 2022, the journalist Aziz Zemouri wrote an article on the Le Point magazine's website claiming that Raquel Garrido and her partner Alexis Corbière illegally employed an undocumented housekeeper. They denied this. A counter-investigation by Médiapart showed 'errors and inconsistencies' in the article, which was retracted the next day by the magazine, which apologised to the couple.

Following this article, on 8 October 2024, Jean-Christophe Lagarde and Anouar Bouhadjela, a police officer, were put under investigation by the Paris prosecutor's office for organised fraud and selling stolen goods; Garrido and Corbière having made a complaint.
