= Seine-Saint-Denis's 7th constituency =

Constituency of the National Assembly of France

7th constituency of Seine-Saint-Denis
- inline Constituency of the National Assembly of France

- Deputy: Alexis Corbière; L'Après
- Department: Seine-Saint-Denis
- Cantons: Bagnolet, Montreuil
- Registered voters: 141,389

Seine-Saint-Denis' seventh constituency is a French legislative constituency in the Seine-Saint-Denis département (north-east of Paris). It is entirely contained within the city of Montreuil.

== Deputies ==
Election	Member	Party
1986	Proportional representation - no election by constituency	
1988	Jean-Pierre Brard	PCF
1993	Jean-Pierre Brard	PCF
1997	Jean-Pierre Brard	CAP
2002	Jean-Pierre Brard	CAP
2007	Jean-Pierre Brard	CAP
2012	Razzy Hammadi	PS
2017	Alexis Corbière	LFI
2022	Alexis Corbière	LFI
2024	Alexis Corbière	LFI
2024	Alexis Corbière	L'Après

== Election results ==
=== 2024 ===
Candidate	Party	Alliance	First round			Second round		
Candidate	Party	Alliance	Votes	%	+/–	Votes	%	+/–
Alexis Corbière	LFI diss.		21,802	40.19	N/A	25,033	57.16	N/A
Sabrina Ali-Benali	LFI	NFP	19,740	36.39	-27.18	18,759	42.84	N/A
Pauline Breteau	HOR	ENS	5,458	10.06	-5.93			
Françoise Trova	RN		5,254	9.68	+4.87			
Antoine Toche	DIV		713	1.31	N/A			
Eric Verhaeghe	DIV		518	0.95	N/A			
Aurélie Jochaud	LO		344	0.63	-0.82			
Yannick Duterte	DVG		180	0.33	N/A			
Elsa Caudron	DIV		165	0.30	N/A			
Sebastien Atlani	DIV		78	0.14	N/A			
Valid votes			54,252	98.03	+0.54	43,792	91.75	N/A
Blank votes			824	1.49	-0.55	3,273	6.86	N/A
Null votes			267	0.48	+0.01	664	1.39	N/A
Turnout			55,343	66.31	+20.41	47,729	57.17	N/A
Abstentions			28,114	33.69	-20.41	35,757	42.83	N/A
Registered voters			83,457			83,486		
Source: Ministry of the Interior, Le Monde
Result						LFI HOLD		

=== 2022 ===
Legislative Election 2022: Seine-Saint-Denis's 7th constituency
Party	Candidate	Votes	%	±%
LFI (NUPÉS)	Alexis Corbière	22,718	62.94	+13.32
LREM (Ensemble)	Marie-Laure Brossier	5,773	15.99	−8.71
RN	Karim Yagoubi-Morocho	1,735	4.81	+0.01
DVG	Choukri Yonis	1,562	4.33	N/A
PA	Catherine Dehay	961	2.66	N/A
REC	Myriam Mehidi	872	2.42	N/A
UDI (UDC)	Madina Boucabeille	799	2.21	−4.11
Others	N/A	1,674		
Turnout		36,094	45.90	+1.10
LFI hold				

=== 2017 ===
Legislative Election 2017: Seine-Saint-Denis's 7th constituency
Party	Candidate	Votes	%	±%
LREM	Halima Menhoudj	8,264	24.70	N/A
LFI	Alexis Corbière	7,226	21.60	N/A
PCF	Gaylord Le Chequer	3,363	10.05	−22.70
PS	Razzy Hammadi	3,297	9.85	−26.86
EELV	Pierre Serne	2,717	8.12	N/A
DVG	Jean-Pierre Brard	2,208	6.60	N/A
LR	Manon Laporte	2,115	6.32	−4.39
FN	Sébastien Jolivet	1,607	4.80	−3.30
Others	N/A	2,661		
Turnout		34,072	44.80	−5.15
2nd round result
LFI	Alexis Corbière	16,246	57.90	N/A
LREM	Halima Menhoudj	11,812	42.10	N/A
Turnout		30,181	39.68	+17.05
LFI gain from PS		Swing		

=== 2012 ===
Razzy Hammadi is elected without opponent in the second round following the withdrawal of Jean-Pierre Brard.

Legislative Election 2012: Seine-Saint-Denis's 7th constituency
Party	Candidate	Votes	%	±%
PS	Razzy Hammadi	13,001	36.71	
FG	Jean-Pierre Brard	11,599	32.75	
UMP	Muriel Bessis	3,794	10.71	
FN	Annie Habert	2,867	8.10	
DIV	Nathalie Gomez	1,021	2.88	
Far left	François Mailloux	724	2.04	
MoDem	David Xardel	713	2.01	
Others	N/A	1,696		
Turnout		35,415	49.95	
2nd round result
PS	Razzy Hammadi	16,121	100.00	
Turnout		16,121	22.63	
PS gain from CAP				

=== 2007 ===
The constituency was one of just two (the other being Nord's 19th constituency) in which there was only one candidate in the second round, thus guaranteeing his re-election. The law provides that candidates obtaining the votes of at least 12.5% of registered voters in the first round advance to the second round. The parties of the mainstream left had a nationwide agreement whereby if two of them advanced to the second round, the second-placed would automatically withdraw. Primarily, this was to avoid dividing the left-wing or centre-left electorate in constituencies where a right-wing, centre-right or far-right candidate had also reached the second round. In Montreuil, however, the Communist and Socialist candidates were the only ones to reach the second round, respectively in first and second place. Socialist candidate Mouna Viprey honoured the agreement and withdrew, enabling Brard to be re-elected in a walkover. 30.17% of voters nonetheless cast a blank ballot.

Legislative Election 2007: Seine-Saint-Denis 5th - 2nd round
Party	Candidate	Votes	%	±%
CAP	Jean-Pierre Brard	11 912	100	+47.77
Turnout		17 059	34.20	−16.84
CAP hold		Swing	+47.77	

Legislative Election 2007: Seine-Saint-Denis 7th - 1st round
Party	Candidate	Votes	%	±%
CAP	Jean-Pierre Brard	7 897	28.53	
PS	Mouna Viprey	7 028	25.39	
UMP	Laurent Vigier	6 152	22.22	
LV	Fabienne Vansteenkiste	1 867	6.74	
LCR	François Mailloux	1 323	4.78	
FN	Michel Collier	1 130	4.08	
Other	Paul Arnaud	925	3.34	
TCNE	Léone Verbeurgt	323	1.17	
LO	Jean-Marie Lenoir	236	0.85	
MNR	Patricua Vayssière	226	0.82	
POI	Christel Keiser	168	0.61	
Other	Rachid Nekkaz	156	0.56	
Other	Christelle Levert	122	0.44	
DVG	Béatrice Durand	91	0.33	
Other	Jean-Pierre Djemba	40	0.14	
Turnout		28 060	56.26	

=== 2002 ===
Legislative Election 2002: Seine-Saint-Denis's 7th constituency
Party	Candidate	Votes	%	±%
CAP	Jean-Pierre Brard	7,811	29.84	
PS	Mouna Viprey	5,610	21.43	
UMP	Marc Gaulin	5,507	21.04	
FN	Françoise Fromont	2,584	9.87	
LV	Patrick Petitjean	2,151	8.22	
UDF	Alain Allan Knoll	711	2.72	
LCR	Laure Laufer	651	2.49	
Others	N/A	1,153		
Turnout		26,567	60.28	
2nd round result
CAP	Jean-Pierre Brard	10,622	52.23	
PS	Mouna Viprey	9,715	47.77	
Turnout		22,493	51.04	
CAP hold				

=== 1997 ===
Legislative Election 1997: Seine-Saint-Denis's 7th constituency
Party	Candidate	Votes	%	±%
CAP	Jean-Pierre Brard	9,203	34.12	
FN	Serge Balassi	4,500	16.68	
PS	Marie-Paule Airaud	4,128	15.30	
UDF	Max Guyon	4,020	14.90	
LV	Marianne Blanc	1,261	4.67	
LO	Germaine Bauer	943	3.50	
GE	Wanda Facon	763	2.83	
Others	N/A	2,157		
Turnout		27,876	58.32	
2nd round result
CAP	Jean-Pierre Brard	19,012	73.10	
FN	Serge Balassi	6,997	26.90	
Turnout		28,449	62.53	
CAP gain from PCF				
