= Brahim Hammouche =

French politician

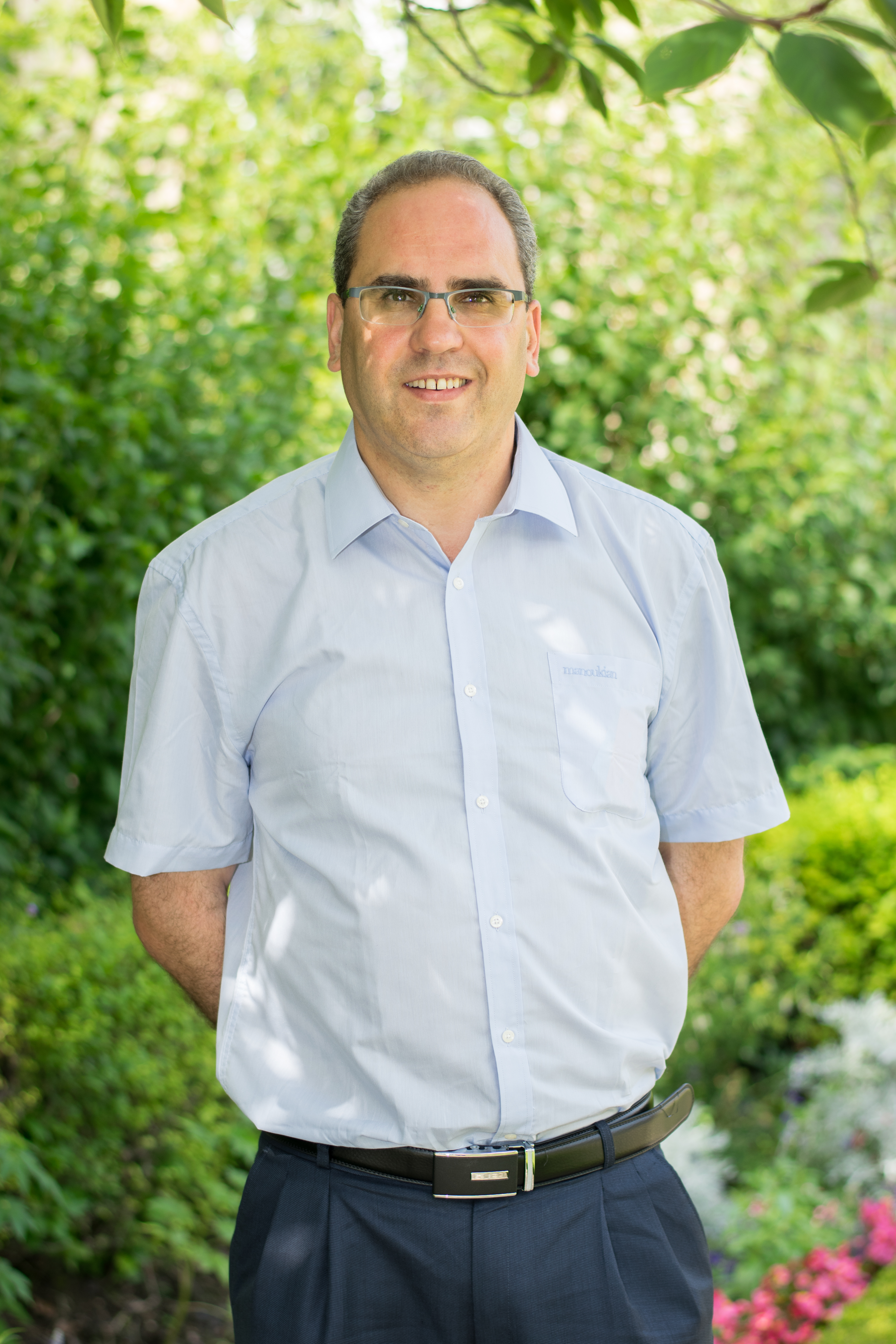

Member of the National Assembly for Moselle's 8th constituency
- In office 21 June 2017 – 21 June 2022
- Preceded by: Michel Liebgott
- Succeeded by: Laurent Jacobelli

Personal details
- Born: 17 May 1971 (age 55) Semaoune, Algeria
- Party: PS (before 2005); MoDem (since 2007)
- Education: Henri Poincaré University
- Occupation: Physician

Brahim Hammouche (born 17 May 1971) is a French physician and politician of the Democratic Movement (MoDem) who has been serving as a member of the National Assembly since the 2017 elections, representing Moselle.

== Early life ==
Hammouche moved to France in 1973. He worked as a doctor at the head of the psychiatric ward at Hayange Hospital.

== Political career ==
Hammouche belonged to the Socialist Party until 2005 before joining the MoDem.

Hammouche was elected to the French National Assembly on 18 June 2017, representing the 8th of Moselle.

In the National Assembly, Hammouche served on the Committee on Social Affairs. He is President of the France-Luxembourg Friendship Group.

He lost his seat in the first round of the 2022 French legislative election.
