= Moselle's 8th constituency =

Constituency of the National Assembly of France

8th constituency of Moselle
- inline Constituency of the National Assembly of France

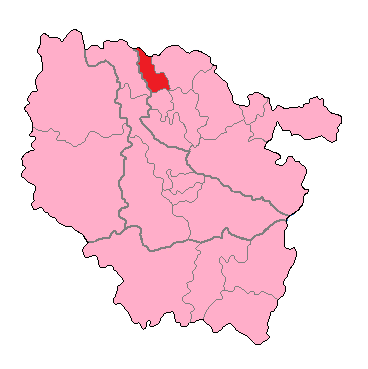
- Moselle's 8th Constituency shown within Lorraine
- Deputy: Laurent Jacobelli; RN
- Department: Moselle
- Cantons: Algrange, Fameck, Florange, Fontoy, Hayange, Moyeuvre-Grande
- Registered voters: 91,179

The 8th constituency of Moselle is a French legislative constituency in the Moselle département.

== Description ==
Moselle's 8th constituency was radically altered following boundary changes prior to the 2012 elections so that only Fameck remained from its previous incarnation. The resulting seat consists on a slither of territory between the river Moselle and the border with Meurthe-et-Moselle to the west.

The seat was won easily by Socialist Michel Liebgott in the 2012 elections after a National Front candidate secured a place in the second round.

== Historic Representation ==
Election	Member	Party
1986	Proportional representation - no election by constituency	
1988	Jean Kiffer	RPR
1993	Jean Kiffer	RPR
1997	Jean-Marie Aubron	PS
2002	Jean-Marie Aubron	PS
2007	Aurélie Filippetti	PS
2012	Michel Liebgott	PS
2017	Brahim Hammouche	MoDem
2022	Laurent Jacobelli	RN

== Election results ==
=== 2024 ===
Legislative Election 2024: Moselle's 8th constituency
Party	Candidate	Votes	%	±%
LO	Annick Jolivet	1,249	2.46	+0.90
LR	Raphaëlle Rosa	3,296	6.49	+2.96
RN	Laurent Jacobelli	23,558	46.36	+11.18
LFI (NFP)	Céline Leger	14,724	28.98	+1.41
PRV (Ensemble)	Samuel Zonato	7,986	15.72	N/A
Turnout		50,813	97.11	+61.47
Registered electors		91,374		
2nd round result
RN	Laurent Jacobelli	26,435	54.41	+8.05
LFI	Céline Leger	22,147	45.59	+16.61
Turnout		48,582	91.67	−5.44
Registered electors		91,382		
RN hold		Swing		

=== 2022 ===
Candidate	Label	First round		Second round	
Candidate	Label	Votes	%	Votes	%
Laurent Jacobelli	RN	11,167	35.18	15,176	52.43
Céline Leger	FI (NUPES)	8,750	27.57	13,770	47.57
Brahim Hammouche	MoDem (Ensemble)	7,455	23.49		
Sébastien André	R!	1,159	3.65		
Raphaëlle Rosa	LR (UDC)	1,120	3.53		
Claire David	DLF (UPF)	573	1.81		
Chariya Oum	PA	544	1.71		
Annick Jolivet	LO	496	1.56		
Kévin Flaus	POID	479	1.51		
Votes		32,263	100.00	31,946	100.00
Blank votes		577	1.78	2,370	7.42
Null votes		168	0.52	620	1.94
Turnout		31,743	35.64	28,956	35.01
Abstentions			64.36		64.99
Registered voters					
Source: Le Monde Public Sénat

=== 2017 ===
Candidate	Label	First round		Second round	
Candidate	Label	Votes	%	Votes	%
Brahim Hammouche	MoDem	9,729	30.16	16,150	58.84
Hervé Hoff	FN	7,517	23.30	11,297	41.16
Lionel Burriello	FI	5,038	15.62		
Peggy Mazzero-Becker	PS	3,140	9.73		
Éliane Assioma-Costa	LR	2,488	7.71		
Patrick Peron	PCF	1,936	6.00		
Pascal Didier	ECO	897	2.78		
Bernadette Meckes	DLF	455	1.41		
Bernard Thierry	EXG	377	1.17		
Xavier Romero	DIV	248	0.77		
Anne-Catherine Levecque	EXG	231	0.72		
Kévin Flaus	REG	207	0.64		
Camille Kiffer	REG	0	0.00		
Votes		32,263	100.00	27,447	100.00
Valid votes		32,263	97.55	27,447	90.81
Blank votes		640	1.94	2,116	7.00
Null votes		170	0.51	662	2.19
Turnout		33,073	35.78	30,225	32.70
Abstentions		59,366	64.22	62,211	67.30
Registered voters		92,439		92,436	
Source: Ministry of the Interior

=== 2012 ===
Legislative Election 2012: Moselle's 8th constituency
Party	Candidate	Votes	%	±%
PS	Michel Liebgott	18,326	44.28	
FN	Fabien Engelmann	8,348	20.17	
UMP	Sylvie Thomas-Jaminet	7,093	17.14	
FG	Patrick Peron	3,704	8.95	
MoDem	Frédéric Di Egidio	904	2.18	
Others	N/A	3,016		
Turnout		41,391	45.40	
2nd round result
PS	Michel Liebgott	25,448	64.40	
FN	Fabien Engelmann	14,067	35.60	
Turnout		39,515	43.34	
PS hold				

== Sources ==
Official results of French elections from 2002: "Résultats électoraux officiels en France" (in French).
