= Seine-Saint-Denis's 3rd constituency =

Constituency of the National Assembly of France

3rd constituency of Seine-Saint-Denis
- inline Constituency of the National Assembly of France

- Deputy: Thomas Portes; LFI
- Department: Seine-Saint-Denis
- Registered voters: 72,572

The 3rd constituency of Seine-Saint-Denis (French: Troisième circonscription de la Seine-Saint-Denis) is one of the 12 legislative constituencies in Seine-Saint-Denis (93) département, France. Like the other 576 French constituencies, it elects one MP using the two-round system.

The current boundaries of the constituency are entirely different to those that existed before the 2010 redistricting. The current boundaries are largely the same as those of the now-defunct 13th constituency.

== Deputies ==
Election	Member	Party
1988	Muguette Jacquaint	PCF
1993	Muguette Jacquaint	PCF
1997	Muguette Jacquaint	PCF
2002	Muguette Jacquaint	PCF
2007	Daniel Goldberg	PS
2012	Michel Pajon	PS
2017	Patrice Anato	LREM
2022	Thomas Portes	LFI
2024	Thomas Portes	LFI

== Election results ==
=== 2024 ===
Candidate	Party	Alliance	First round			Second round		
Candidate	Party	Alliance	Votes	%	+/–	Votes	%	+/–
Thomas Portes	LFI	NFP	20,648	41.68	+4.23	30,688	69.71	+15.75
Denis Cretin-Gielly	RN		10,539	21.28	+9.63	13,335	30.29	N/A
Eric Allemon	UDI	ENS	5,681	11.47	-14.02			
Patrice Anato	DVC		5,521	11.15	N/A			
Stéphanie Richard	DVC		2,710	5.47	N/A			
Djénéba Diaby	DVC		2,452	4.95	N/A			
Maxence Buttey	DIV		1,146	2.31	N/A			
Maëlle Gaucherand	LO		451	0.91	+0.17			
Sarah Astrid Dacko	DIV		388	0.78	N/A			
Gaspard Nicolle	DIV		1	0.00	N/A			
Valid votes			49,537	97.69	-0.25	44,023	89.65	-4.40
Blank votes			785	1.55	+0.03	4,063	8.27	+4.03
Null votes			386	0.76	+0.22	1,018	2.07	+0.37
Turnout			50,708	65.45	+20.98	49,104	63.36	+18.88
Abstentions			26,770	34.55	-20.98	28,398	36.64	-18.88
Registered voters			77,478			77,502		
Source: Ministry of the Interior, Le Monde
Result						LFI HOLD		

=== 2022 ===
Candidate	Party	Alliance	First round			Second round		
Candidate	Party	Alliance	Votes	%	+/–	Votes	%	+/–
Thomas Portes	LFI	NUPÉS	11,223	34.06	+16.58	17,085	53.96	+11.05
Patrice Anato	LREM	ENS	8,399	25.49	-14.19	14,580	46.04	-11.05
Denis Cretin-Gielly	RN		3,840	11.65	+2.02			
Harald Poillot	LR	UDC	2,777	8.43	-3.82			
Joseph Zrihen	DVC		1,414	4.29	N/A			
Louise Ben Mami	DVE		1,311	3.98	+2.42			
Myriam Bordreuil	REC		1,285	3.90	N/A			
Albert Melka		FGR	1,001	3.04	N/A			
Nathalie Amouroux	PA		598	1.81	N/A			
Sandrine Campana	LP	UPF	526	1.60	-0.94			
Maëlle Gaucherand	LO		243	0.74	-0.05			
Fathia Chelki	UDMF		205	0.62	N/A			
Geneviève Enaud	POID		116	0.35	N/A			
Maëlle Massandjie Toure	DIV		11	0.03	N/A			
Valid votes			17,633	97.53	-0.20	16,747	95.49	+3.71
Blank votes			320	1.77	+0.09	549	3.13	-2.88
Null votes			127	0.70	+0.12	242	1.38	-0.83
Turnout			18,080	32.79	-11.16	17,538	31.80	-6.59
Abstentions			37,065	67.21	+11.16	37,614	68.20	+6.59
Registered voters			55,145			55,152		
Source: Ministry of the Interior, Le Monde
Result						LFI GAIN FROM LREM		

=== 2017 ===
Candidate	Party	Alliance	First round			Second round		
Candidate	Party	Alliance	Votes	%	+/–	Votes	%	+/–
Patrice Anato	REM	MP	12,369	39.68	N/A	14,598	57.09	N/A
Dominique Delaunay	LFI		4,669	14.98	N/A	10,971	42.91	N/A
Zartoshte Bakhtiari	LR	UDC	3,818	12.25	-13.44			
Patrice Vella	FN		3,001	9.63	-2.71			
Emmanuelle Cosse	PRG		2,952	9.47	N/A			
Eric Manfredi	DVE		1,150	3.69	N/A			
Chrystelle Ferrier	DLF		792	2.54	N/A			
Marie-Claire Lafon	PCF		780	2.50	-5.19			
Louise Ben Mami	DVE		485	1.56	+0.39			
Ivan Buisson	DIV		335	1.07	N/A			
Corinne Tixier	DVE		254	0.81	N/A			
Maëlle Gaucherand	EXG		245	0.79	+0.27			
Janine Maurice-Bellay	DIV		216	0.69	N/A			
Maurice Stobnicer	EXG		103	0.33	-0.06			
Valid votes			31,169	97.73	-0.79	25,569	91.78	-4.51
Blank votes			537	1.68	N/A	1,673	6.01	N/A
Null votes			186	0.58	N/A	616	2.21	N/A
Turnout			31,892	43.95	-8.82	27,858	38.39	-12.47
Abstentions			40,680	56.05	+8.82	44,714	61.61	+12.47
Registered voters			72,572			72,572		
Source: Ministry of the Interior
Result						REM GAIN FROM PS		

=== 2012 ===
Candidate	Party	Alliance	First round			Second round		
Candidate	Party	Alliance	Votes	%	+/–	Votes	%	+/–
Michel Pajon	PS	MP	16,245	44.19	+16.07	20,910	60.38	-1.14
Bruno Beschizza	UMP		9,445	25.69	+7.36	13,721	39.62	+1.14
Renée Asselin	FN	RBM	4,535	12.34	+4.79			
Riva Cherchanoc		FG	2,827	7.69	-10.30			
Sylvie Duffrene	EELV	MP	1,759	4.79	+2.39			
Louise Ben Mami	DVE		431	1.17	N/A			
Audrey Levavasseur	DVD		400	1.09	N/A			
Daniela Foubert	DVD		301	0.82	N/A			
Michel Paulin	EXD		273	0.74	N/A			
Sébastien Biscaro	EXG		212	0.58	N/A			
Maëlle Gaucherand	EXG		190	0.52	N/A			
Maurice Stobnicer	EXG		142	0.39	N/A			
Valid votes			36,760	98.52	+0.48	34,631	96.29	+0.52
Blank and null votes			553	1.48	-0.48	1,336	3.71	-0.52
Turnout			37,313	52.77	+3.61	35,967	50.86	+5.24
Abstentions			33,402	47.23	-3.61	34,748	49.14	-5.24
Registered voters			70,715			70,715		
Source: Ministry of the Interior
Result						PS HOLD		

=== 2007 ===
Candidate	Party	Alliance	First round			Second round		
Candidate	Party	Alliance	Votes	%	+/–	Votes	%	+/–
Daniel Goldberg	PS		6,113	28.12	N/A	12,121	61.52	N/A
Kamel Hamza	UMP	MP	3,985	18.33	+4.08	7,583	38.48	N/A
Gilles Poux	PCF		3,910	17.99	-14.68			
Vincent Capo-Canellas	MoDem		1,816	8.35	N/A			
Serge Wargniez	FN		1,642	7.55	-9.36			
Slimane Dib	DVD		833	3.83	N/A			
Mouloud Aounit	DVG		705	3.24	N/A			
Bénedicte Gaudilliere	LCR		581	2.67	+0.94			
Jean-François Monino	LV		522	2.40	N/A			
Malika Ahmed	DIV		319	1.47	N/A			
Michel Jouannin	LO		287	1.32	-0.24			
Jean-Michel Helleboid	EXD		272	1.25	N/A			
Simon Ciaravano	DVE		228	1.05	N/A			
Djamila Khelaf	PRG		175	0.81	N/A			
Michel Almeras	DIV		105	0.48	N/A			
Leïla Azouz	EXG		103	0.47	N/A			
Laure Molinari	DVE		93	0.43	N/A			
Benabes Belfodil	DIV		44	0.20	N/A			
Gilles Audin	DIV		2	0.01	N/A			
Sébastien Foy	DVD		1	0.00	N/A			
Valid votes			21,736	98.04	-0.01	19,704	95.77	+2.28
Blank and null votes			434	1.96	+0.01	870	4.23	-2.28
Turnout			22,170	49.16	-6.13	20,574	45.62	-4.02
Abstentions			22,926	50.84	+6.13	20,574	45.62	+4.02
Registered voters			45,096			45,095		
Source: Ministry of the Interior
Result						PS GAIN FROM PCF		

=== 2002 ===
Candidate	Party	Alliance	First round			Second round		
Candidate	Party	Alliance	Votes	%	+/–	Votes	%	+/–
Muguette Jacquaint	PCF		7,146	32.67	+3.81	12,979	69.31	+2.60
Jean-Michel Girard	FN		3,700	16.91	-4.68	5,746	30.69	-2.60
Anne Valentin	UMP	UPMP	3,118	14.25	N/A			
Thierry Augy	UDF	UPMP	2,856	13.06	-4.82			
Jean-Jacques Karman	PCF diss.		2,263	10.34	N/A			
Malika Ahmed	PR		579	2.65	N/A			
Marie-Claude Benezet	LCR		378	1.73	N/A			
Michel Jouannin	LO		341	1.56	-1.78			
Slimane Dib	RPF	UPMP	340	1.55	N/A			
Angela Louviers	DIV		266	1.22	N/A			
Hermina Fardeau	MNR		236	1.08	N/A			
Mario Rossi	Cap21		218	1.00	N/A			
Jacques Guilbert	PT		173	0.79	N/A			
Lucienne Lagille	MEI		142	0.65	-0.03			
Lara Winter	EXG		120	0.55	N/A			
Valid votes			21,876	98.05	+1.31	18,725	93.49	+2.54
Blank and null votes			435	1.95	-1.31	1,305	6.51	-2.54
Turnout			22,311	55.29	-6.59	20,030	49.64	-13.12
Abstentions			18,039	44.71	+6.59	20,319	50.36	+13.12
Registered voters			40,350			40,349		
Source: National Assembly
Result						PCF HOLD		

=== 1997 ===
Candidate	Party	Alliance	First round			Second round		
Candidate	Party	Alliance	Votes	%	+/–	Votes	%	+/–
Muguette Jacquaint	PCF	GP	7,735	28.86	-0.46	17,052	66.71	+12.55
Guilbert Hainaut	FN		5,837	21.77	+2.04	8,509	33.29	N/A
Jacques Salvator	PS	GP	4,841	18.06	+8.36			
Frédéric Gailland	FD	UDF/Union	4,793	17.88	-5.07			
Sylvain Ros	LV	GP	1,083	4.04	N/A			
Michel Jouannin	LO		895	3.34	+1.48			
Claude Patin	LDI		466	1.74	N/A			
Antonio Diaz-Florian	DVE		395	1.47	N/A			
Laurent Zarnitsky	PS diss.		259	0.97	N/A			
Moïs Maatouk	MEI		183	0.68	N/A			
Liliane Cordova	SEGA		148	0.55	-2.26			
Alain Lascary	MDR		106	0.40	N/A			
Philippe Dupinet	DIV		65	0.24	N/A			
Sid Ahmed Rouis	GE		0	0.00	-5.62			
Valid votes			26,806	96.74	+0.52	25,561	90.95	-3.86
Blank and null votes			903	3.26	-0.52	2,543	9.05	+3.86
Turnout			27,709	61.88	+1.94	28,104	62.76	+2.75
Abstentions			17,072	38.12	-1.94	16,679	37.24	-2.75
Registered voters			44,781			44,783		
Source: Ministry of the Interior
Result						PCF HOLD		

=== 1993 ===
Candidate	Party	Alliance	First round			Second round		
Candidate	Party	Alliance	Votes	%	+/–	Votes	%	+/–
Muguette Jacquaint	PCF		8,517	29.32		15,524	54.16	
Frédéric Gailland	UDF	UPF	6,667	22.95		13,139	45.84	
Guillaume Fiquet	FN		5,733	19.73				
Jacques Salvator	PS	ADFP	2,817	9.70				
Zair Kedadouche	GE	EÉ	1,634	5.62				
Corinne Lacolley	NERNA		970	3.34				
Roland Taysse	SEGA		816	2.81				
Michel Jouannin	LO		539	1.86				
Andre Fouquet	EXD		476	1.64				
Michele Fricheteau	DIV		360	1.24				
Alain Ketterer	CNIP	UPF	263	0.91				
Danielle Clause	PT		261	0.90				
Valid votes			29,053	96.22		28,663	94.81	
Blank and null votes			1,142	3.78		1,570	5.19	
Turnout			30,195	59.94		30,233	60.01	
Abstentions			20,184	40.06		20,145	39.99	
Registered voters			50,379			50,378		
Source: Ministry of the Interior
Result						PCF HOLD		
