= Seine-Saint-Denis's 5th constituency =

Constituency of the National Assembly of France

5th constituency of Seine-Saint-Denis
- inline Constituency of the National Assembly of France

- The district in Seine-Saint-Denis
- Deputy: Aly Diouara; SSDAC
- Department: Seine-Saint-Denis

The 5th constituency of Seine-Saint-Denis is a French legislative constituency in Seine-Saint-Denis.

== Historic representation ==
Election	Member	Party
1988	Jean-Claude Gayssot	PCF
1993	Jean-Claude Gayssot	PCF
1997	Bernard Birsinger	PCF
2002	Jean-Christophe Lagarde	UDF
2007	Jean-Christophe Lagarde	NC
2012	Jean-Christophe Lagarde	NC
2017	Jean-Christophe Lagarde	UDI
2022	Raquel Garrido	LFI
2024	Aly Diouara	SSDAC

== Election results ==
=== 2024 ===
Candidate	Party	Alliance	First round			Second round		
Candidate	Party	Alliance	Votes	%	+/–	Votes	%	+/–
Aly Diouara	SSDAC	NFP	12,141	33.10	-7.43	20,511	60.55	+7.06
Aude Lagarde	UDI	ENS	9,006	24.56	-16.85	13,362	39.45	-7.06
Raquel Garrido	LFI diss.		8,672	23.65	N/A	WITHDREW		
Eric Kozelko	RN		6,382	17.40	+7.76			
Rodolphe Feger	LO		359	0.98	+0.21			
Markeins Pierre	DIV		115	0.31	N/A			
Tatiana Boutignon	DIV		0	0.00	N/A			
Hélène Ballouhey	DIV		0	0.00	N/A			
Valid votes			36,675	97.44	+0.07	33,873	94.47	-1.54
Blank votes			596	1.58	-0.29	1,378	3.84	+1.14
Null votes			369	0.98	+0.22	605	1.69	+0.40
Turnout			37,640	57.11	+20.61	35,856	54.38	+15.26
Abstentions			28,268	42.89	-20.61	30,082	45.62	-15.26
Registered voters			65,908			65,938		
Source: Ministry of the Interior, Le Monde
Result						DVG GAIN FROM LFI		

=== 2022 ===
Legislative Election 2022: Seine-Saint-Denis's 5th constituency
Party	Candidate	Votes	%	±%
LFI (NUPÉS)	Raquel Garrido	8,786	37.90	+9.10
UDI (UDC)	Jean-Christophe Lagarde	7,745	33.41	-3.14
RN	Nelly Lestradet	2,235	9.64	+0.45
LREM (Ensemble)	Nabil Ait Akkache	1,854	8.00	−11.47
REC	Raphaël Libert	545	2.35	N/A
DVG	Amel Hormi	515	2.22	N/A
Others	N/A	1,501		
Turnout		23,806	36.50	−1.73
2nd round result
LFI (NUPÉS)	Raquel Garrido	13,107	53.50	N/A
UDI (UDC)	Jean-Christophe Lagarde	11,394	46.50	−19.60
Turnout		24,501	39.12	+5.41
LFI gain from UDI				

=== 2017 ===
Legislative Election 2017: Seine-Saint-Denis's 5th constituency
Party	Candidate	Votes	%	±%
UDI	Jean-Christophe Lagarde	8,691	36.55	−6.91
LREM	Malika Maalem-Chibane	4,629	19.47	N/A
LFI	Ugo Portier	3,325	13.98	N/A
PCF	Abdel Sadi	2,494	10.49	−8.38
FN	Jean-François Perier	2,186	9.19	+0.08
PS	Valérie Mery	551	2.32	−18.29
EELV	Fatimata Sy	478	2.01	+1.08
Others	N/A	1,425		
Turnout		24,410	38.23	−10.01
2nd round result
UDI	Jean-Christophe Lagarde	12,746	66.10	+9.37
LREM	Malika Maalem-Chibane	6,537	33.90	N/A
Turnout		21,525	33.71	−13.28
UDI hold		Swing		

=== 2012 ===
2012 legislative election in Seine-Saint-Denis's 5th constituency
Candidate	Party	First round		Second round	
Candidate	Party	Votes	%	Votes	%
Jean-Christophe Lagarde	NC	12,868	43.46%	16,128	56.73%
Milouda Latreche	PS	6,103	20.61%	12,303	43.28%
Abdel Sadi	FG	5,588	18.87%		
Herminia Fardeau	FN	2,699	9.11%		
Michel Mathieu	PS dissident	879	2.97%		
Djamila Bekkaye	EELV	276	0.93%		
Carole Breviere	MoDem	260	0.88%		
Véronique Clement	SE	209	0.71%		
Djafar Hamoum	Émergence	198	0.67%		
Isabelle Couffin-Guerin	LO	173	0.58%		
Roxiane Boisson	DLR	133	0.45%		
Frédéric Perrod	PP	127	0.43%		
Emile Fabrol	NPA	99	0.33%		
Valid votes		29,612	98.63%	28,429	97.20%
Spoilt and null votes		412	1.37%	818	2.80%
Votes cast / turnout		30,024	48.24%	29,247	46.99%
Abstentions		32,218	51.76%	32,994	53.01%
Registered voters		62,242	100.00%	62,241	100.00%

=== 2007 ===
Legislative Election 2007: Seine-Saint-Denis's 5th constituency
Party	Candidate	Votes	%	±%
NM	Jean-Christophe Lagarde	12,748	45.95	+12.42
PCF	Abdel Sadi	5,626	20.28	−8.14
PS	Myriam Benoudiba	3,531	12.73	−1.44
MPF	Alexandre Varaut	2,249	8.11	N/A
FN	Christine Benaut	1,275	4.60	−9.05
Far left	Dominique Berrou	654	2.36	N/A
Others	N/A	1,662		
Turnout		28,121	52.84	−5.00
2nd round result
NM	Jean-Christophe Lagarde	15,795	59.87	+9.83
PCF	Abdel Sadi	10,585	40.13	−9.83
Turnout		27,056	50.84	−3.72
NM gain from UDF				

=== 2002 ===
Legislative Election 2002: Seine-Saint-Denis's 5th constituency
Party	Candidate	Votes	%	±%
UDF	Jean-Christophe Lagarde	9,130	33.53	+15.1
PCF	Bernard Birsinger	7,740	28.42	−6.66
PS	Dominique Andreani	3,859	14.17	+2.37
FN	Charles Camard	3,718	13.65	−9.22
Others	N/A	2,783		
Turnout		27,641	57.84	−4.87
2nd round result
UDF	Jean-Christophe Lagarde	12,706	50.04	N/A
PCF	Bernard Birsinger	12,684	49.96	−17.45
Turnout		26,071	54.56	−10.07
UDF gain from PCF				

=== 1997 ===
Legislative Election 1997: Seine-Saint-Denis's 5th constituency
Party	Candidate	Votes	%	±%
PCF	Jean-Claude Gayssot	10,960	35.08	
FN	Michel Personnaz	7,146	22.87	
UDF	Jean-Christophe Lagarde	5,759	18.43	
PS	Eliane Emsalem	3,688	11.80	
LV	Patrick Benkemoun	902	2.89	
LO	Alain Roulaud	885	2.83	
Others	N/A	1,907		
Turnout		32,221	62.71	
2nd round result
PCF	Jean-Claude Gayssot	20,617	67.41	
FN	Michel Personnaz	9,967	32.59	
Turnout		33,198	64.63	
PCF hold				
