= Jean-Christophe Lagarde =

French politician (born 1967)

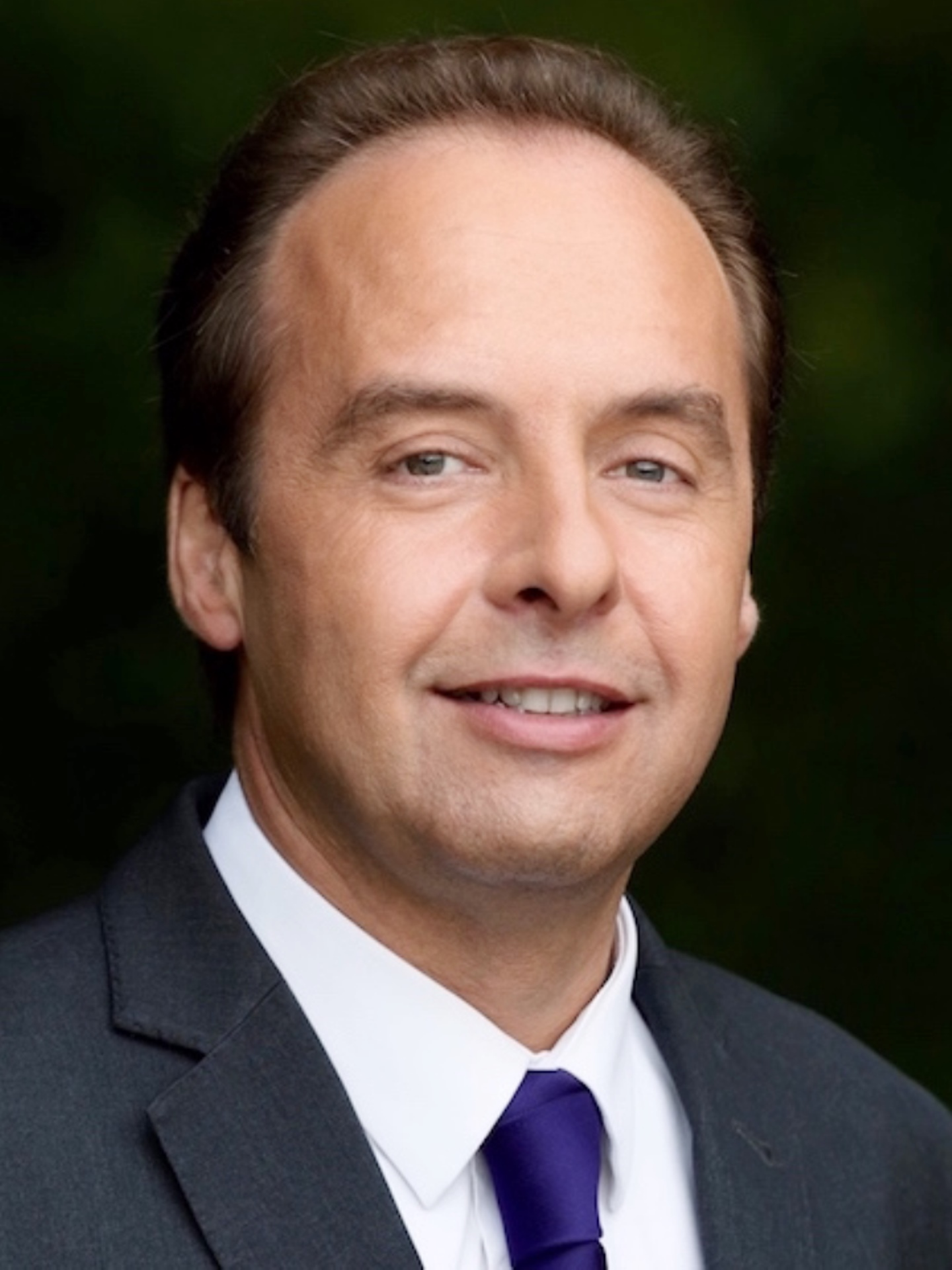

President of the Union of Democrats and Independents
- Incumbent
- Assumed office 13 November 2014
- Preceded by: Jean-Louis Borloo

President of the UDI and Independents group in the National Assembly
- Incumbent
- Assumed office 28 November 2017 Serving with Franck Riester (2017–2018)
- Preceded by: Stéphane Demilly

Member of the National Assembly for Seine-Saint-Denis's 5th constituency
- In office 19 June 2002 – 2022
- Preceded by: Bernard Birsinger

Mayor of Drancy
- In office 17 March 2001 – 2 September 2017
- Preceded by: Gilbert Conte
- Succeeded by: Aude Lagarde

Personal details
- Born: 24 October 1967 (age 58) Châtellerault, France
- Party: Union of Democrats and Independents
- Spouse: Aude Lavail
- Children: 4

Jean-Christophe Lagarde (French pronunciation: [ʒɑ̃ kʁistɔf laɡaʁd]; born 24 October 1967) is a French politician serving as president of the Union of Democrats and Independents (UDI) since 2014. He succeeded Jean-Louis Borloo after a short interim by Yves Jégo. Lagarde has been the member of the National Assembly for the fifth constituency of Seine-Saint-Denis from 2002 to 2022.

== Political career ==
=== Career in local politics ===
A native of Châtellerault, Vienne, Lagarde was Mayor of Drancy from 2001 to 2017.

=== Career in national politics ===
Lagarde was the member of the National Assembly for Seine-Saint-Denis's 5th constituency from the 2002 legislative election until the 2022 election, when he was defeated by Raquel Garrido.

In the National Assembly, Lagarde was a member of the Committee on Legal Affairs from 2002 until 2012. He also served as one of the Assembly's vice-presidents, from 2006 until 2007 and again from 2010 until 2012.

In the 2012 presidential election, Lagarde publicly endorsed incumbent Nicolas Sarkozy. Following the legislative elections later that year, he joined the newly established UDI led by Jean-Louis Borloo and became the spokesperson of its parliamentary group. In 2013, Borloo included Lagarde in his shadow cabinet; in this capacity, Lagarde served as opposition counterpart to Minister of the Interior Manuel Valls.

In the Republicans’ 2016 presidential primaries, Lagarde and his UDI endorsed Alain Juppé as candidate for the office of President of France. When the party's majority chose François Fillon to run in the 2017 presidential election instead, Lagarde joined Fillon's campaign team. Amid the Fillon affair, he first called on the candidate to quit the election race in favour of Juppé but eventually suspended the UDI's support for the campaign altogether. Ahead of the Republicans' 2017 leadership election, he announced that the alliance between UDI and LR would end indefinitely in the event of Laurent Wauquiez becoming the party's chairman.

Since the 2017 elections, Lagarde has been serving on the Defence Committee. In addition to his committee assignments, he is a member of the French-Algerian Parliamentary Friendship Group, the French-Tunisian Parliamentary Friendship Group and the French delegation to the NATO Parliamentary Assembly.

== Political positions ==
In 2013, Lagarde was – alongside Yves Jégo – one of two UDI members who voted against his parliamentary group's majority and instead supported the legalization of same-sex marriage in France.

In March 2019, Lagarde opposed Bruno Le Maire's proposal for a so-called GAFA tax.
