= Seine-Saint-Denis's 10th constituency =

Constituency of the National Assembly of France

10th constituency of Seine-Saint-Denis
- inline Constituency of the National Assembly of France

- Deputy: Nadège Abomangoli; LFI
- Department: Seine-Saint-Denis
- Registered voters: 68,698

The 10th constituency of Seine-Saint-Denis (French: Dixième circonscription de la Seine-Saint-Denis) is one of the 12 legislative constituencies in Seine-Saint-Denis département of France (93). Like the other 576 French constituencies, it elects one MP using the two-round system.

== Geography ==
The constituency is located in the north-east suburbs of the Paris metropolitan area.

== Deputies ==
Election	Member	Party	Source
1988	Jacques Delhy	PS	
1993	Jean-Claude Abrioux	RPR	
1997	Jean-Claude Abrioux	RPR	
2002	Jean-Claude Abrioux	UMP	
2007	Gérard Gaudron	UMP	
2012	Daniel Goldberg	PS	
2017	Alain Ramadier	LR	
2022	Nadège Abomangoli	LFI	
2024	Nadège Abomangoli	LFI	

== Election results ==
=== 2024 ===
Candidate	Party	Alliance	First round			Second round		
Candidate	Party	Alliance	Votes	%	+/–	Votes	%	+/–
Nadège Abomangoli	LFI	NFP	21,282	52.60	+11.82			
Monique Trova	RN		7,409	18.31	+6.37			
Alain Ramadier	LR		7,129	17.62	-2.45			
Martial Meyongo Amougou	DIV		3,321	8.21	N/A			
Gaëtan Minardi	LO		563	1.39	+0.36			
Praince Germain Loubota	REC		381	0.94	-2.18			
Ahmed El Ouafi	DIV		291	0.72	N/A			
Amèle Bentahar	DIV		84	0.21	N/A			
Valid votes			40,460	97.79	+0.38			
Blank votes			643	1.55	-0.40			
Null votes			272	0.66	+0.02			
Turnout			41,375	60.86	+24.22			
Abstentions			26,608	39.14	-24.22			
Registered voters			67,983					
Source: Ministry of the Interior, Le Monde
Result						LFI HOLD		

=== 2022 ===
Legislative Election 2022: Seine-Saint-Denis's 10th constituency
Party	Candidate	Votes	%	±%
LFI (NUPÉS)	Nadège Abomangoli	9,812	39.71	+6.62
LR (UDC)	Alain Ramadier	4,959	20.07	-2.09
RN	Pauline Chateau	2,950	11.94	+2.57
HOR (Ensemble)	Sonia Bakhti-Alout	2,593	10.49	−18.15
DVC	Leïla Abdellaoui	1,483	6.00	N/A
DVC	Mohamed Bounoua	903	3.65	N/A
REC	Praince Germain Loubota	771	3.12	N/A
Others	N/A	1,238		
Turnout		25,370	36.65	−1.01
2nd round result
LFI (NUPÉS)	Nadège Abomangoli	14,228	55.53	N/A
LR (UDC)	Alain Ramadier	11,394	44.47	−8.45
Turnout		25,622	38.45	+5.98
LFI gain from LR				

=== 2017 ===
Legislative Election 2017: Seine-Saint-Denis's 10th constituency
Party	Candidate	Votes	%	±%
LREM	Billel Ouadah	7,210	28.64	N/A
LR	Alain Ramadier	5,578	22.16	−8.49
LFI	Ambre Froment	3,950	15.69	N/A
PS	Daniel Goldberg	3,629	14.42	−24.81
FN	Huguette Fatna	2,358	9.37	−1.26
PCF	Jean-Marie Touzin	749	2.98	−3.63
DIV	François Asselineau	710	2.82	N/A
Others	N/A	990		
Turnout		25,874	37.66	−10.44
2nd round result
LR	Alain Ramadier	10,470	52.92	+8.87
LREM	Billel Ouadah	9,313	47.08	N/A
Turnout		22,305	32.47	−14.74
LR gain from PS		Swing		

=== 2012 ===
Legislative Election 2012: Seine-Saint-Denis's 10th constituency
Party	Candidate	Votes	%	±%
PS	Daniel Goldberg	12,659	39.23	+10.40
UMP	Gérard Gaudron	9,890	30.65	+3.14
FN	Atika Keddouh	3,431	10.63	+6.13
FG	Marie-Jeanne Queruel	2,134	6.61	+3.59
EELV	Hervé Suaudeau	959	2.97	−0.04
DIV	Mimoun El Hejraoui	871	2.70	N/A
Others	N/A	2,322		
Turnout		32,266	48.10	−6.18
2nd round result
PS	Daniel Goldberg	17,714	55.95	+6.93
UMP	Gérard Gaudron	13,948	44.05	−6.93
Turnout		31,662	47.21	
PS gain from UMP				

=== 2007 ===
Legislative Election 2007: Seine-Saint-Denis's 10th constituency
Party	Candidate	Votes	%	±%
PS	Gérard Segura	8,003	28.83	N/A
UMP	Gérard Gaudron	7,637	27.51	−16.10
DVD	Philippe Dallier	6,743	24.29	N/A
FN	Mireille Roset	1,248	4.50	−9.93
PCF	Xavier Toulgat	838	3.02	N/A
LV	Alain Amedro	836	3.01	−27.49
DVD	Abderrzzak Bezzaouya	820	2.95	N/A
Far left	Eric Guerineau	560	2.02	N/A
Others	N/A	1,078		
Turnout		28,460	54.28	−5.36
2nd round result
UMP	Gérard Gaudron	14,011	50.98	−6.29
PS	Gérard Segura	13,473	49.02	N/A
Turnout		28,336	54.05	−0.45
UMP hold				

=== 2002 ===
Legislative Election 2002: Seine-Saint-Denis's 10th constituency
Party	Candidate	Votes	%	±%
UMP	Jean-Claude Abrioux	12,135	43.61	+13.50
LV	Alain Amedro	8,488	30.50	N/A
FN	Mireille Roset	4,015	14.43	−7.01
PR	Billel Ouadah	678	2.44	N/A
LCR	Françoise Lamontagne	590	2.12	N/A
Others	N/A	1,922		
Turnout		28,325	59.64	−5.02
2nd round result
UMP	Jean-Claude Abrioux	14,385	57.27	+9.70
LV	Alain Amedro	10,735	42.73	N/A
Turnout		25,827	54.50	−15.75
UMP hold				

=== 1997 ===
Legislative Election 1997: Seine-Saint-Denis's 10th constituency
Party	Candidate	Votes	%	±%
RPR	Jean-Claude Abrioux	8,862	30.11	
FN	Philippe Milliau	6,309	21.44	
PS	Harlem Désir	6,285	21.36	
PCF	Bernard Labbé	3,796	12.90	
GE	Paolo Marques de Figueiredo	1,082	3.68	
LO	Yves Guillemot	852	2.90	
DVD	Daniel Jacob	702	2.39	
Others	N/A	1,542		
Turnout		30,504	64.66	
2nd round result
RPR	Jean-Claude Abrioux	15,217	47.57	
PS	Harlem Désir	12,137	37.94	
FN	Philippe Milliau	4,632	14.48	
Turnout		33,130	70.25	
RPR hold				
