= Michel Pajon =

French politician (born 1949)

Member of the National Assembly for Seine-Saint-Denis's 3rd constituency
- In office 19 June 2012 – 19 June 2017
- Preceded by: New constituency
- Succeeded by: Patrice Anato

Mayor of Noisy-le-Grand
- In office 1995–2015
- Preceded by: Antoine Pontone
- Succeeded by: Brigitte Marsigny

Personal details
- Born: 30 June 1949 (age 76) Drancy, Seine, France
- Party: Socialist Party

Michel Pajon (born 30 June 1949) is a French politician who was a member of the National Assembly of France. He represented the 13th (1996–2012) and 3rd (2012–2017) of the Seine-Saint-Denis department, as a member of the Socialiste, radical, citoyen et divers gauche.
