= Razzy Hammadi =

French politician

Member of the National Assembly for Seine-Saint-Denis
- In office 2012–2017
- Preceded by: Jean-Pierre Brard
- Succeeded by: Alexis Corbière

Personal details
- Born: 22 February 1979 (age 47) Toulon, France
- Party: Socialist Party
- Education: Panthéon-Sorbonne University

Razzy Hammadi (born in Toulon on 22 February 1979) is a French politician, elected in 2012 as a deputy for the Socialist Party.

Born in France of North African-born parents (Algerian Kabyle father, Tunisian mother), he is a former president of the Young Socialist Movement. He moved to another constituency near Paris to be elected and finished first in Seine-Saint-Denis' 7th constituency at the 2012 French legislative election with 36,71% of the vote, ahead of Left Front incumbent Jean-Pierre Brard, MP since 1988. Brard withdrew in his favour for the second round for Hammadi to be elected in the second round. Close to Benoît Hamon, he was involved in drafting the Consumption Law in 2013–2014, being "rapporteur" (MP in charge of preparing the discussion of the MPs with the government) at the National Assembly.

He launched a bid to become mayor of Montreuil in the 2014 municipal elections, but only secured 9.8% of the vote during the first round and failed to qualify for the second round.
