= Laurent Jacobelli =

French politician (born 1969)

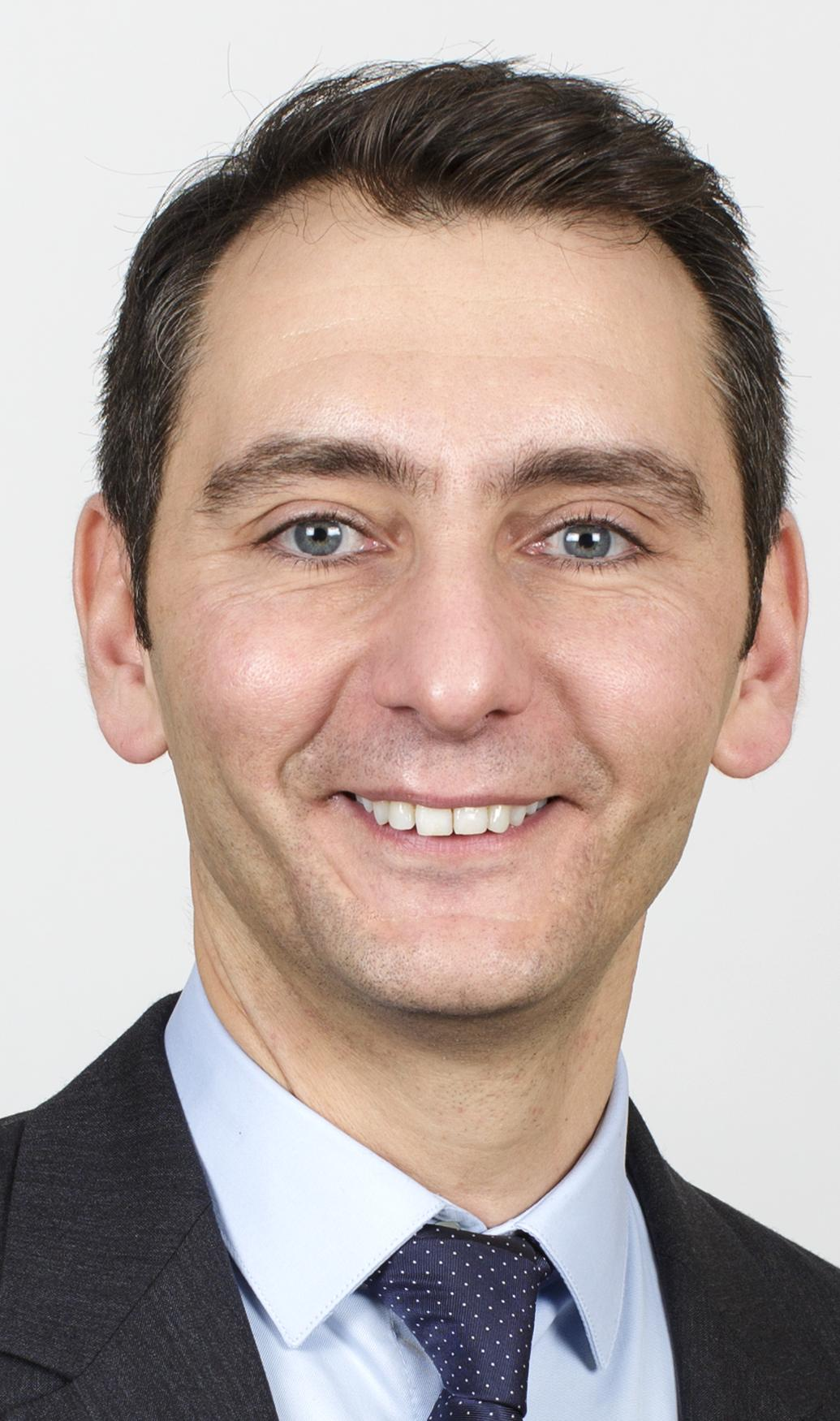
- Laurent Jacobelli in 2015

Member of the National Assembly for Moselle's 8th constituency
- Incumbent
- Assumed office 22 June 2022
- Preceded by: Brahim Hammouche

Spokespeople of the National Rally
- Incumbent
- Assumed office November 2017
- Leader: Marine Le Pen; Jordan Bardella

Personal details
- Born: 13 October 1969 (age 56) Thiais, France
- Party: National Rally
- Education: ESSEC Business School; ESCP Europe

Laurent Jacobelli (French pronunciation: [lɔʁɑ̃ ʒakɔbɛli]; born 13 October 1969) is a French politician. In 2022, he was elected member of the National Assembly as a member of the National Rally for Moselle's 8th constituency.

== Early life ==
Jacobelli was born on 13 October 1969 in Thiais. He is of Italian descent. He graduated from the ESSEC Business School in 1992 and from the ESCP in 1993.

== Career ==
Jacobelli worked as an audiovisual manager for TV5 and served as head of TV5's programs from 2005 to 2008. Between 2009 and 2013 he worked as an executive for the Zodiak Kids Studios channel. He then founded his own television production company, Sunny Prod.

He has also served as a reservist in the French Navy.

== Politics ==
He joined Nicolas Dupont-Aignan in 2014 before signing up for regional elections in December 2015 in the Grand Est.

On 19 May 2017, Jacobelli left France Arise. In June 2017, he was the FN candidate in the 10th constituency of Bouches-du-Rhône (21.88% in the 1st round, 41.73% in the second round).

In November 2017 he was appointed head of communication for the National Rally.

== See also ==
- List of deputies of the 16th National Assembly of France
