= Daniel Goldberg (politician) =

French politician

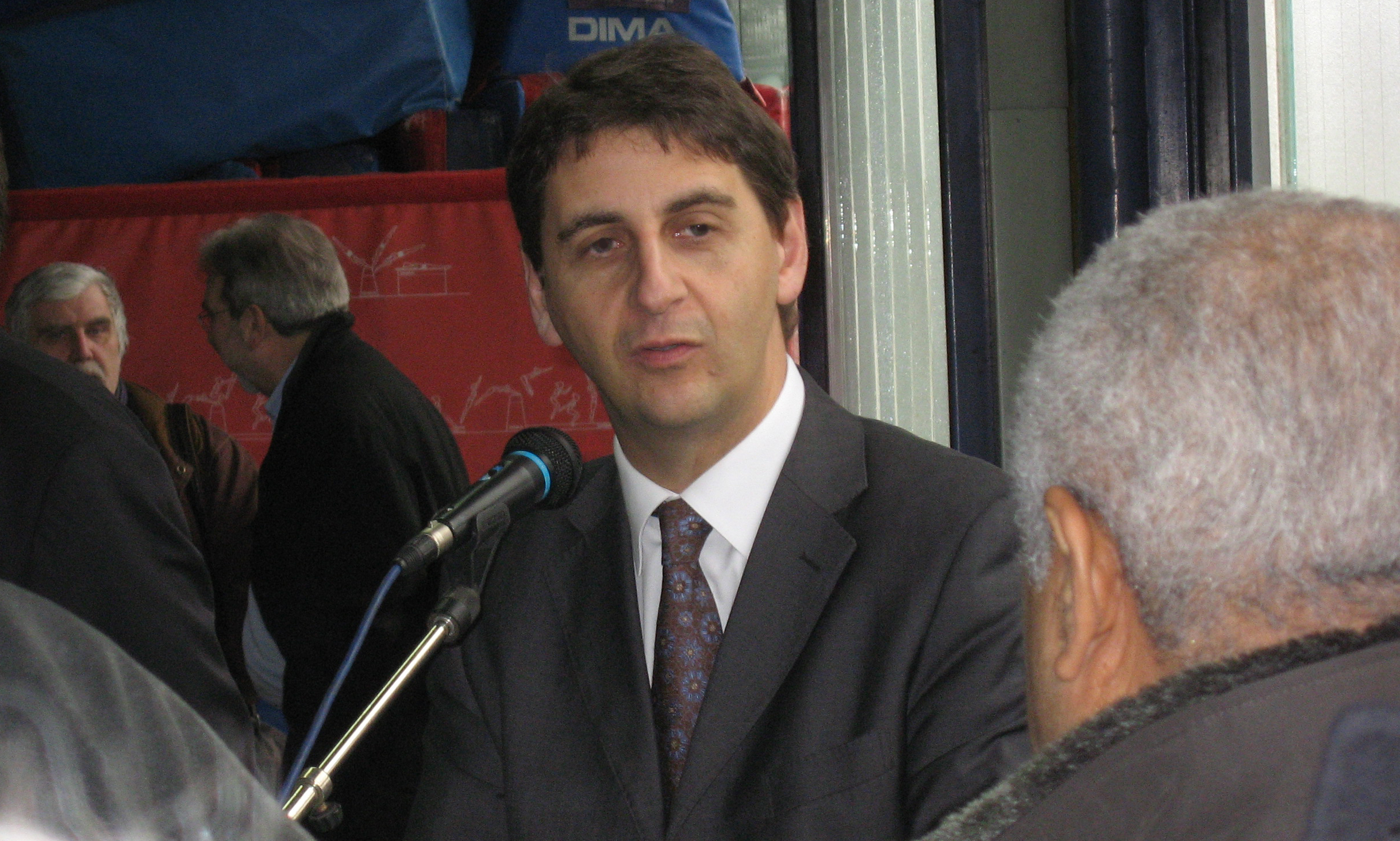

Member of the National Assembly for Seine-Saint-Denis's 10th constituency
- In office 2012–2017
- Preceded by: Gérard Gaudron
- Succeeded by: Alain Ramadier

Personal details
- Born: 24 August 1965 (age 61) Saint-Denis, France
- Party: Socialist Party
- Education: Paris 13 University

Daniel Goldberg (born 24 August 1965, Saint-Denis, France) is a French Socialist politician. He is a mathematics teacher and was elected deputy in 2007 to represent La Courneuve.

== Biography ==
Goldberg was born on the August 24th 1965. He studied at the University of Paris 13 and earned a PhD at Pierre and Marie Curie University (Paris VI).

He was a member of the regional council of the Île-de-France from 2004 to 2007.
