= Jean-Claude Gayssot =

French politician (born 1944)

Minister of Transport
- In office 4 June 1997 – 6 May 2002
- President: Jacques Chirac
- Prime Minister: Lionel Jospin
- Preceded by: Bernard Pons
- Succeeded by: Gilles de Robien

Member of the National Assembly for Seine-Saint-Denis's 5th constituency
- In office 13 June 1988 – 4 June 1997
- Preceded by: None
- Succeeded by: Bernard Birsinger

Personal details
- Born: 6 September 1944 (age 82) Béziers, France
- Party: French Communist Party

Jean-Claude Gayssot (French: [ʒɑ̃ klod ɡɛso]; born 6 September 1944) is a French politician. A member of the French Communist Party (PCF), he was Minister of Transportation in the government of Lionel Jospin of the Socialist Party from 1997 to 2002. He gave his name to the 1990 Gayssot Act repressing Holocaust denial and speech in favor of racial discrimination. He is also responsible for the Act on housing projects (loi SRU), which imposes a 20% housing projects limit in each town lest they pay a penalty fine, in an attempt to struggle against spatial segregation (Neuilly-sur-Seine, one of the wealthiest communes of France, is an often cited example of a commune which prefers to pay rather than respect the limit).
