= Michel Liebgott =

French politician

President of the Communauté d'agglomération du Val de Fensch
- Incumbent
- Assumed office 10 April 2014
- Preceded by: Philippe Tarillon

Mayor of Fameck
- Incumbent
- Assumed office 25 March 1989
- Preceded by: Roger Claude

Member of the National Assembly
- In office 12 June 1997 – 20 June 2017
- Preceded by: Alphonse Bourgasser
- Succeeded by: Brahim Hammouche
- Constituency: Moselle's 10th (1997–2012); Moselle's 8th (2012–2017)

Personal details
- Born: 15 February 1958 (age 67); Algrange, France
- Political party: PS

Michel Liebgott (born 15 February 1958) is a member of the National Assembly of France. He represents the Moselle department, and is a member of the Socialiste, radical, citoyen et divers gauche.
