= Alexis Corbière =

French politician (born 1968)

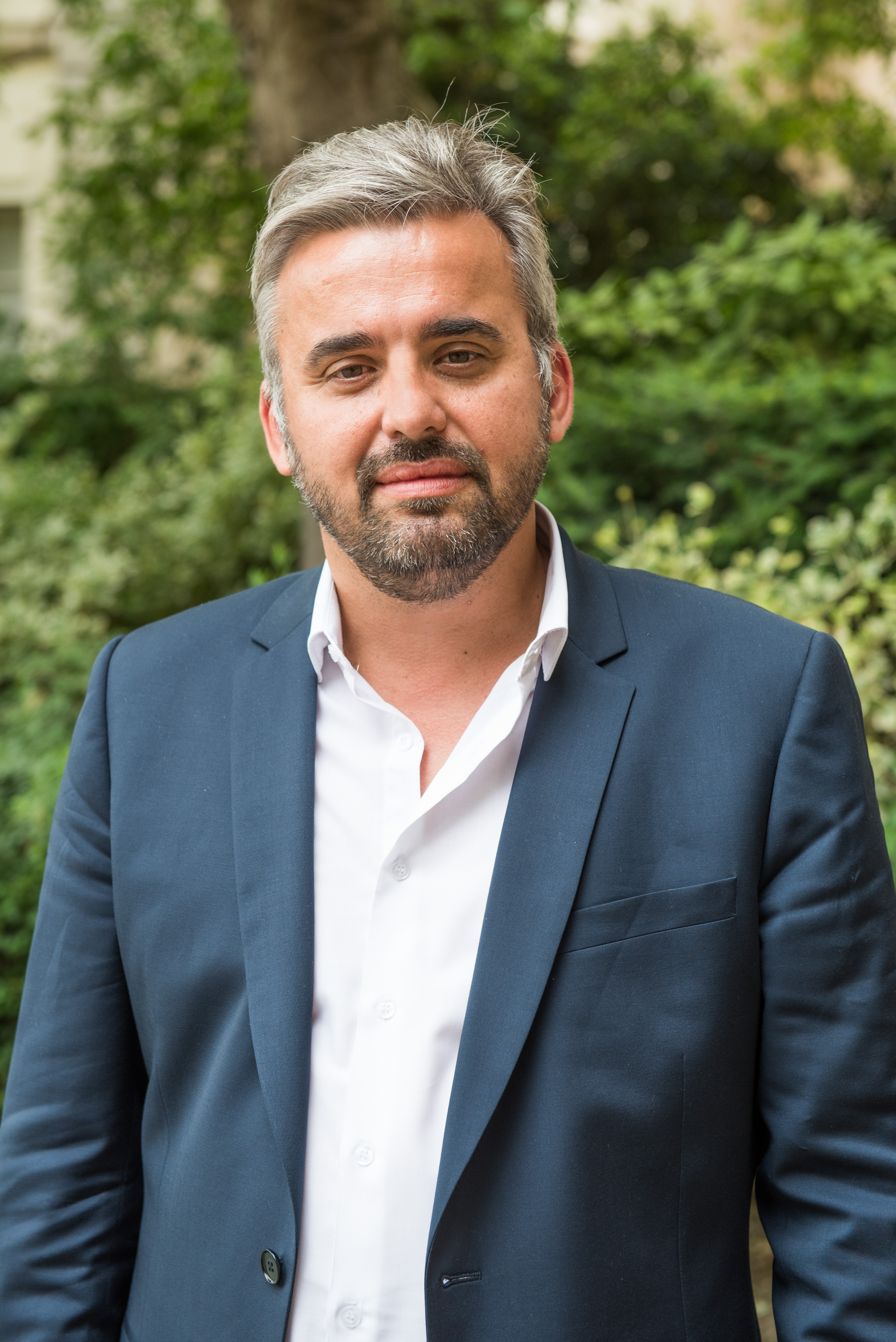

Member of the National Assembly for Seine-Saint-Denis's 7th constituency
- Incumbent
- Assumed office 21 June 2017
- Preceded by: Razzy Hammadi

Personal details
- Born: 17 August 1968 (age 58) Béziers, France
- Party: L'Après (2024–present)
- Other political affiliations: Internationalist Communist Party (Lambert) (1986–1992); Revolutionary Communist League (1993–1997); Socialist Party (1998–2008); Left Party (2008–present); La France Insoumise (2016–2024)
- Spouse: Raquel Garrido (m. 2000)
- Children: 3
- Education: University of Montpellier; Paris Diderot University
- Profession: Teacher

Alexis Corbière (French pronunciation: [alɛksi kɔʁbjɛʁ]; born 17 August 1968) is a French politician. He has been member of the National Assembly for the 7th constituency of the Seine-Saint-Denis department since 2017. Corbière was also a spokesperson for La France Insoumise and the party's leader Jean-Luc Mélenchon in the 2017 French presidential election, before falling out of favor with party leadership prior to the snap 2024 legislative election, in which La France Insoumise supported a previously-unelected candidate against Corbière. He survived the "purge" by winning the 7th constituency of Seine-Saint-Denis with 57.16% of the vote.

A former member of the Revolutionary Communist League from 1993 to 1997, Corbière then joined the Socialist Party where he was elected as the deputy mayor for the 12th arrondissement of Paris in 2001 and would continue to hold this position until 2014. In 2008, Corbière, Mélenchon, and several others left the PS and founded the Left Party. He was also elected to the Council of Paris the same year. He headed FI's first national convention in the suburbs of Lille in 2016.

After being re-elected despite being de-selected by FI ahead of the 2024 French legislative election, he formed L'après with other FI dissidents.

== See also ==
- 2017 French legislative election
- 2022 French legislative election
- 2024 French legislative election
