= Thomas Portes =

French politician (born 1985)

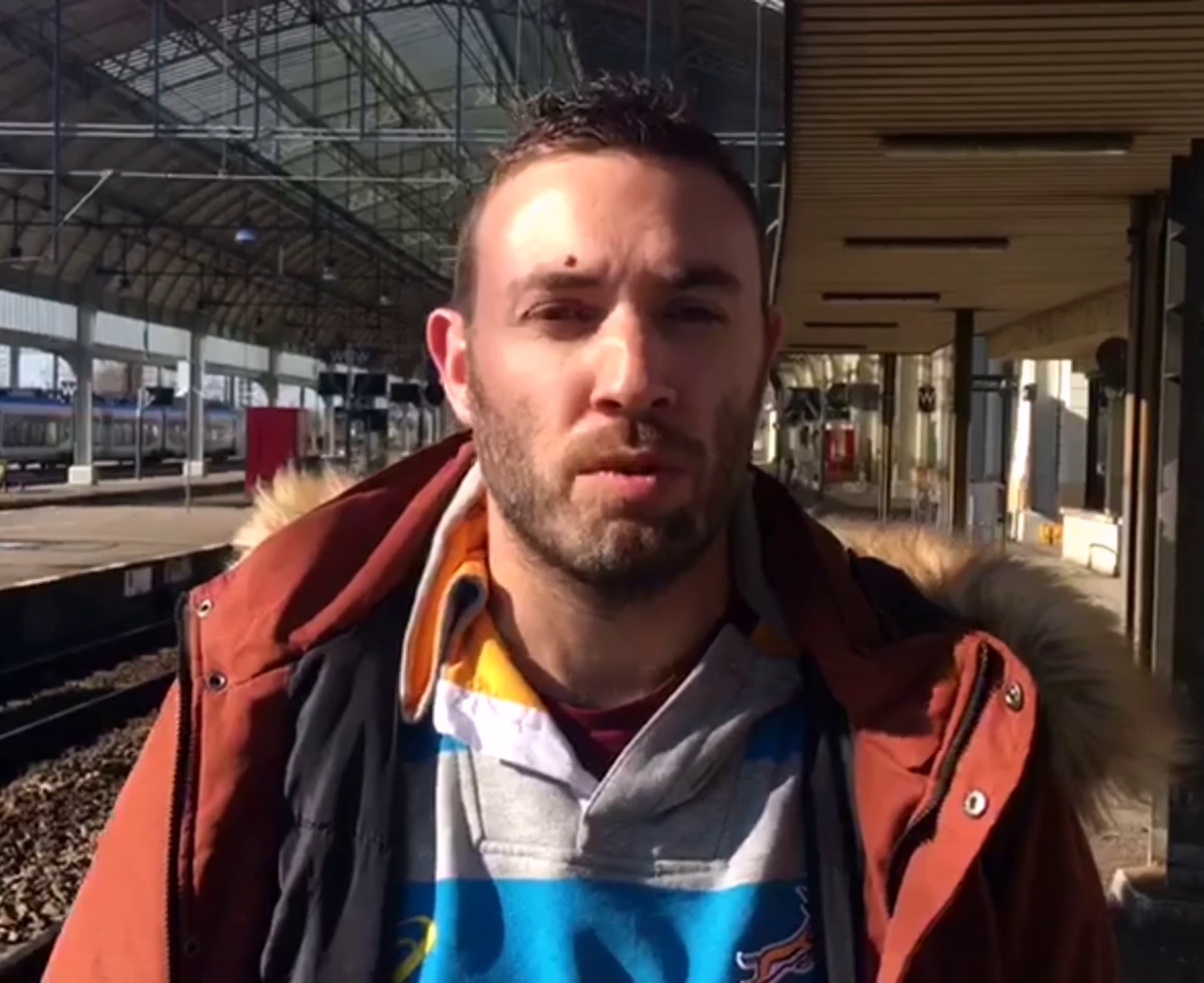
- Thomas Portes in 2018

Member of the National Assembly for Seine-Saint-Denis's 3rd constituency
- Incumbent
- Assumed office 22 June 2022
- Preceded by: Patrice Anato

Personal details
- Born: 18 November 1985 (age 40) Carmaux, Tarn, France
- Party: La France Insoumise (since 2021)
- Other political affiliations: NUPES (2022); NFP (2024); Génération.s (2021); PCF (2014–2020)
- Education: Bordeaux Montesquieu University

Thomas Portes (born 18 November 1985) is a French politician from La France Insoumise who has been representing Seine-Saint-Denis's 3rd constituency in the National Assembly since 2022. In the 2022 French legislative election he unseated En Marche! MP Patrice Anato.

In February 2023, Portes created controversy when he posted a photo on Twitter of himself stepping with his foot placed atop a balloon bearing the image of the Minister of Labor Olivier Dussopt, of whom he was critical. In response, after failing to remove the image from Twitter as requested, he was suspended from the lower house for two weeks.

Portes again sparked controversy when he declared at a rally that Israeli athletes were not welcome at the 2024 Summer Olympics in Paris. The remarks were condemned by the Representative Council of French Jewish Institutions. French Interior Minister Gérald Darmanin said the remarks obviously hinted at antisemitism, and mayor of Nice Christian Estrosi called for the dissolution of the LFI. Karen Taieb, a deputy mayor of Paris, described Portes as "a danger and a disgrace," claiming he is "advocating hatred." Socialist MP Jérôme Guedj expressed on X, "Of course, Israeli athletes are welcome." Additionally, French Foreign Minister Stéphane Séjourné stated during a meeting with EU foreign ministers, "On behalf of France, I want to convey to the Israeli delegation that we welcome you to France for these Olympic Games."

== See also ==
- List of deputies of the 16th National Assembly of France
- List of deputies of the 17th National Assembly of France
