= Jean-Pierre Brard =

French politician (born 1948)

Mayor of Montreuil
- In office 1984–2008
- Preceded by: Marcel Dufriche
- Succeeded by: Dominique Voynet

Member of the French National Assembly for Seine-Saint-Denis
- In office 1988–2012
- Succeeded by: Razzy Hammadi

Personal details
- Born: 7 February 1948 (age 78) Flers, France
- Party: French Communist Party

Jean-Pierre Brard (born 7 February 1948), is a French politician. He was formerly the deputy mayor of the city of Montreuil, Seine-Saint-Denis, later being elected mayor in 1984. A former member of the French Communist Party (until 1996), he is affiliated with the parliamentary group of the Democratic and Republican Left. He is known for his anti-cult and secular activism.

== Early life ==
Jean-Pierre Brard was born 7 February 1948, in Flers, Orne, France.

== Political career ==
He entered politics and was elected deputy mayor of Montreuil, Seine-Saint-Denis, a post he held until 1984 when he was elected mayor of the same city. He remained mayor until March 2008. He ran again for this post later.

He is a member of the Convention for a Progressive Alternative (CAP) and a deputy to the French National Assembly since 1988. A former member of the French Communist Party (until 1996), he is affiliated to the parliamentary group of the Democratic and Republican Left. He is a member of the Parliamentary Office for evaluation of scientific and technological options, and he participates in various task forces and commissions on sects, the economy and finance. In February 2005, he convinced all but one of the present members of the National Assembly present across the political spectrum to support an amendment making education about religious a school educational component in public schools.

== Anti-cult and secular activism ==
Brard is known for his anti-cult and secular stance, for which he has been involved in several legal battles. He is particularly known for his opposition to Protestant groups. He was the vice-president of the Guyard Commission into cults in 1995. In 1999, he wrote the "Sects and Money" report alongside Jacques Guyard, published by a different French parliamentary commission dedicated to investigating the financial status of cults.

In 1998, he was sued by the Jehovah's Witnesses; Brard had been one of the leading actors in the French state's attempt to control the group. He was sued for claiming that the group was responsible for many suicides; it was ruled that though the statement was defamatory it did not constitute "religious bias", resulting in his acquittal. He was sued again by them in 2006, after Brard said their denial of blood transfusions resulted in people's deaths, that they did not pay taxes, and that they covered up serious in-group crimes; this was ruled defamatory but as the statement was deemed to have been made in "good faith" he was again acquitted.

In June 1999, he and Guyard were both sued following Guyard's negative statement on a television show about the group Anthroposophy. Both men's lawyers plead parliamentary immunity as a result of their work on the commission, which was invoked by Brard. In 2001, the Court of Appeal of Paris ruled that while Brard had in fact made defamatory statements, as he had chaired the commission for the Sects and Money report it had been done in good faith and was not guilty. Brard was then sued by the group Landmark Education in 2004, which he had deemed a cult, following his appearance in the 2004 television documentary Voyage to the Land of the New Gurus. The host of the program had questioned Brard over his deeming Landmark a cult without having researched them, to which Brard responded that they were a cult because the program of Landmark made one "relinquish critical thought", and that it was merely done to gain money.

In his most notorious legal battle, in 2005, a Montreuil church (with residents mostly from Zaire and Haiti) was deemed too loud by local residents, who complained to Brard. Brard, according to eyewitnesses, barged into the church and told them "Stop! What you are doing is not rational! There is no God! You must stop!" For this action he was condemned by the president of the Protestant Federation of France, who called his actions a menace and also illegal. The president of the École pratique des hautes études stated in response that "Not since the maréchal of MacMahon during the crisis of May 16 under the Third Republic have we seen in France a public official interrupting an act of worship." The next year, in an unrelated incident, he was found guilty of religious discrimination and fined €1,500, in addition to €2,000 in court costs and €5,000 damages, after he cut the microphone of an alderman during a council meeting and claimed that her wearing of a Catholic cross violated laïcité.

== Political offices held ==
=== Local offices ===
- 1971–1984 City Council and Deputy Mayor of Montreuil
- 1984–2008 Mayor of Montreuil
- 2008–2014 Municipal Councilor of Montreuil (opposition)

=== Member of Parliament ===
- 1988–2012 member of the seventh district of Seine-Saint-Denis
