= Patrice Anato =

French politician (born 1976)

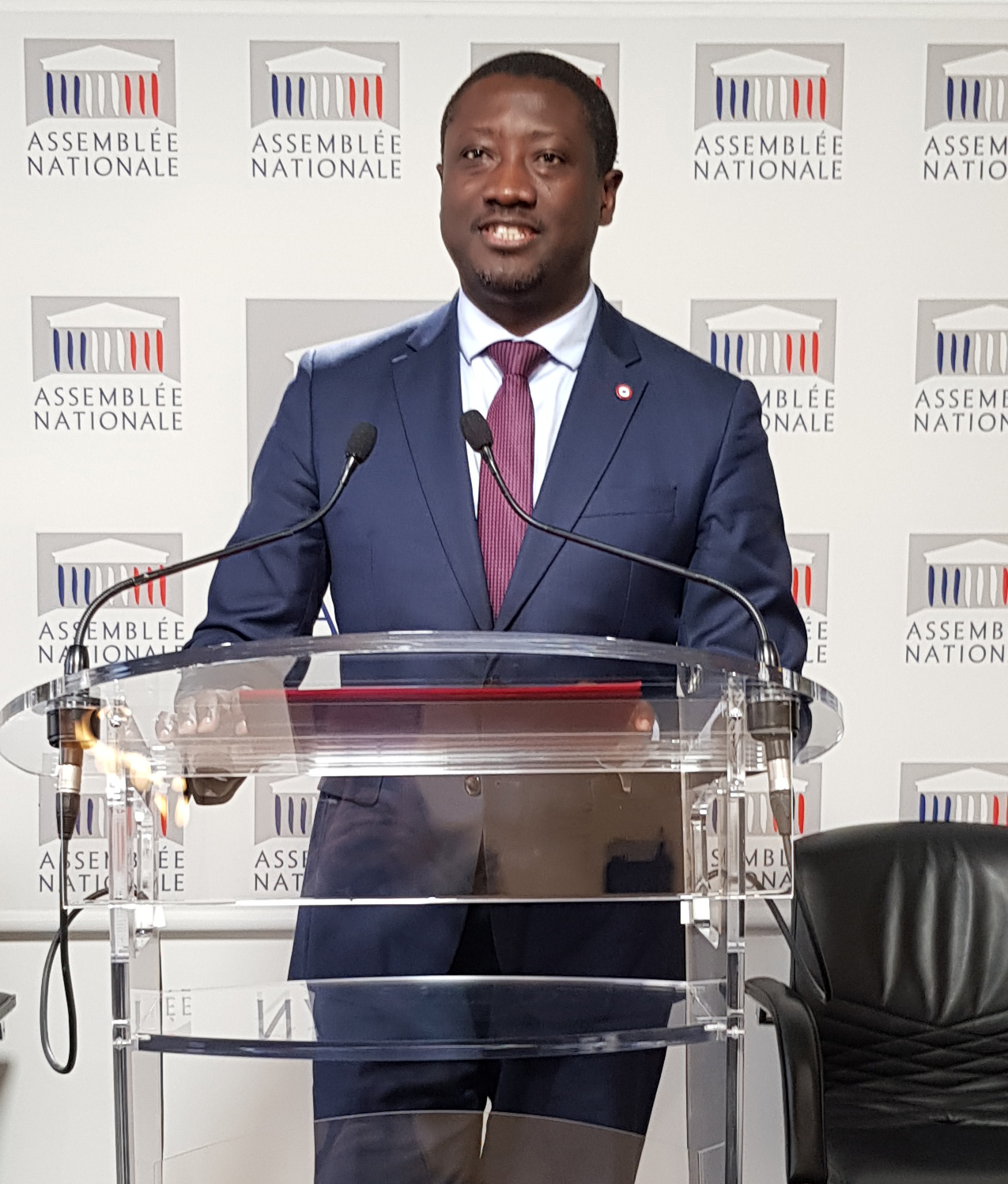
- Patrice Anato in 2019

Member of the National Assembly for Seine-Saint-Denis's 3rd constituency
- In office 21 June 2017 – 21 June 2022
- Preceded by: Michel Pajon
- Succeeded by: Thomas Portes

Personal details
- Born: 14 March 1976 (age 50) Lomé, Togo
- Party: La République En Marche! Centrist Alliance
- Education: University of Paris 1 Pantheon-Sorbonne

Patrice Anato (born 14 March 1976) is a French politician of La République En Marche! (LREM) who served as a member of the French National Assembly from 2017 to 2022, representing the 3rd constituency of the department of Seine-Saint-Denis.

== Political career ==
In parliament, Anato serves as member of the Committee on Economic Affairs and Education and the Committee on European Affairs. In addition to his committee assignments, he is part of the parliamentary friendship groups with Cuba, Ivory Coast, Mali and Nigeria. Since 2019, he has also been a member of the French delegation to the Franco-German Parliamentary Assembly.

In the 2022 French legislative election, he lost his seat to Thomas Portes from La France Insoumise.

== Political positions ==
In July 2019, Anato voted in favor of the French ratification of the European Union’s Comprehensive Economic and Trade Agreement (CETA) with Canada.

In addition to LREM, Anato also joined the Centrist Alliance in 2018.

== See also ==
- 2017 French legislative election
