= Alain Ramadier =

French politician

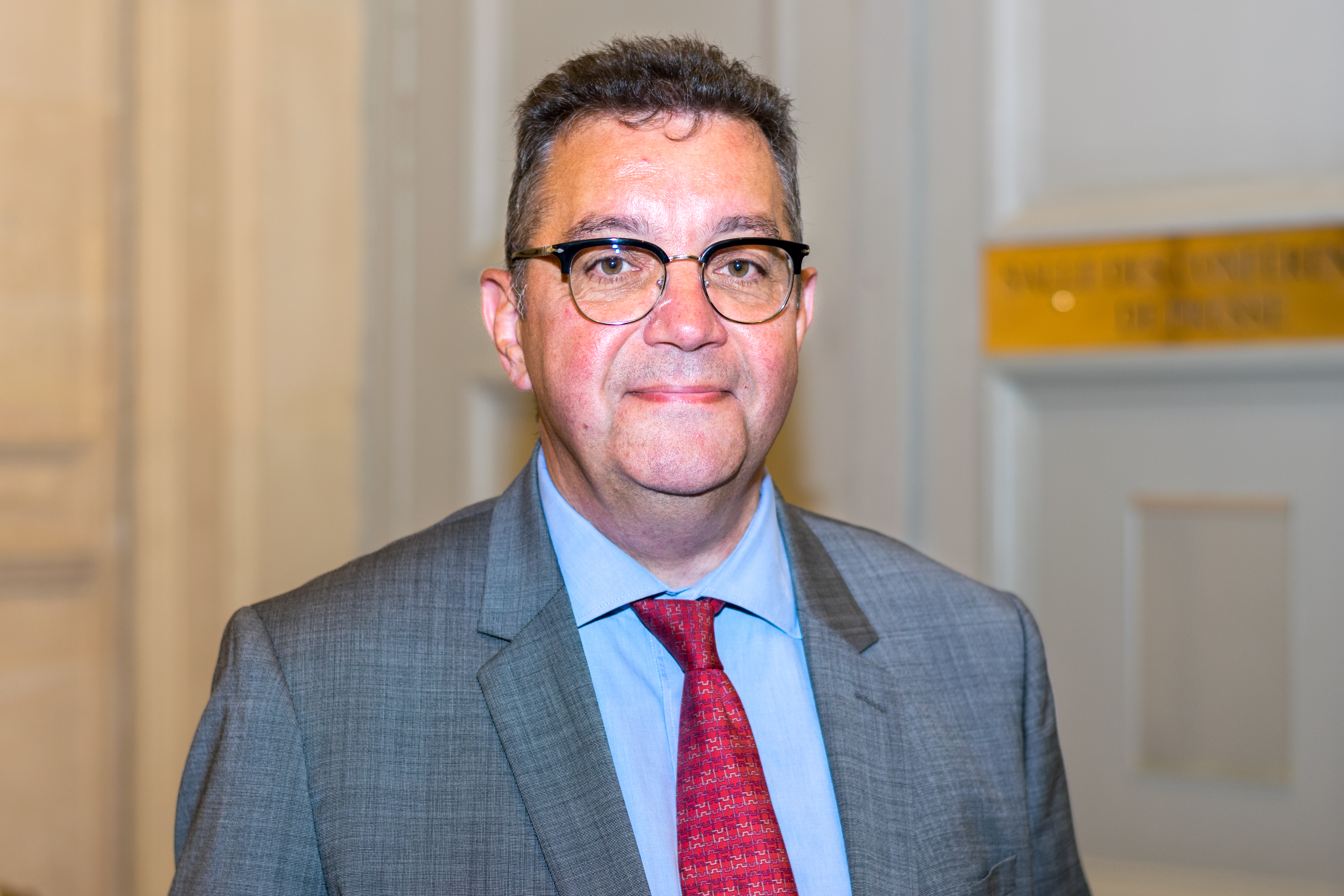

Member of the National Assembly for Seine-Saint-Denis's 10th constituency
- In office 21 June 2017 – 21 June 2022
- Preceded by: Daniel Goldberg
- Succeeded by: Nadège Abomangoli

Personal details
- Born: 8 July 1958 (age 67) Paris, France
- Party: The Republicans

Alain Ramadier (born 8 July 1958) is a French politician of The Republicans who was a member of the National Assembly from 2017 to 2022, representing Seine-Saint-Denis's 10th constituency.

== Political career ==
In parliament, Ramadier was a member of the Committee on Social Affairs. In addition to his committee assignments, he was part of the French delegation to the Inter-Parliamentary Union.

He lost his seat in the 2022 French legislative election to Nadège Abomangoli from La France Insoumise.
