= Convention for a Progressive Alternative =

Left-wing political party founded in France in 1994

The Convention for a Progressive Alternative (French: Convention pour une alternative progressiste, CAP) was a French left-wing political party founded in 1994.

It was founded by reformist Communists (Charles Fiterman, Jean-Pierre Brard), Socialists, Trotskyists and others. The party supported Green candidate Dominique Voynet in the 1995 presidential election.

Fiterman associated CAP to the discussions regarding the Plural Left coalition with the PS, PCF and the Greens. However, the party obtained the lowest electoral results out of all Plural Left members in the 1997 French legislative election, with Jean-Pierre Brard as the party's only parliamentarian.

Since then, the party has declined due to an internal rivalry between the hard-left, seeking an extra-parliamentary far-left line; and reformists, seeking to transform the party in an eco-socialist party of the New Left. As a result, numerous members left CAP to join larger left-wing parties such as the PS or Greens.

Today, Jean-Pierre Brard is the party's only parliamentarian and the party is active only in the Val-de-Marne and Haute-Vienne.

In the 2009 European Parliament election, the party ran as part of the Left Front with the French Communist Party and the Left Party.
