= Nadège Abomangoli =

French politician (born 1975)

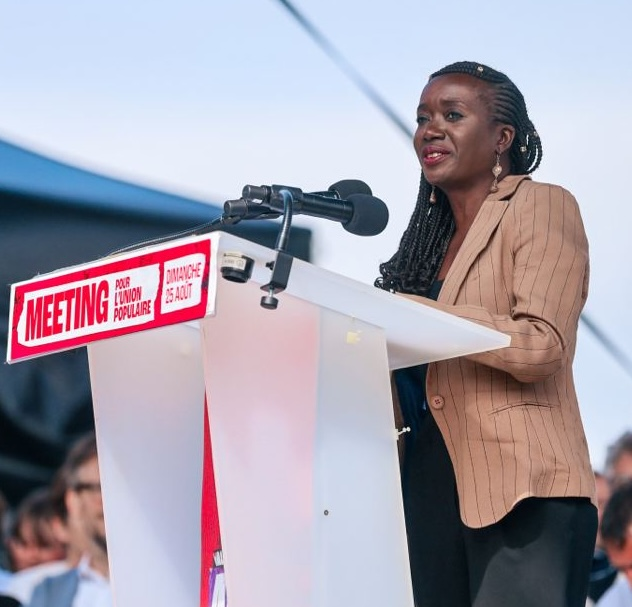
- Nadège Abomangoli in 2024

1st Vice President of the National Assembly
- Incumbent
- Assumed office 1 October 2025
- President: Yaël Braun-Pivet
- Preceded by: Clémence Guetté

3rd Vice President of the National Assembly
- In office 19 July 2024 – 1 October 2025
- President: Yaël Braun-Pivet
- Preceded by: Naïma Moutchou
- Succeeded by: Christophe Blanchet

Member of the National Assembly for Seine-Saint-Denis's 10th constituency
- Incumbent
- Assumed office 22 June 2022
- Preceded by: Alain Ramadier

Personal details
- Born: 15 September 1975 (age 51) Brazzaville, Republic of the Congo
- Party: La France Insoumise
- Education: Sciences Po

Nadège Abomangoli (born 15 September 1975 in Brazzaville, Republic of the Congo) is a French politician from La France Insoumise.

A member of the Socialist Party from 2006 to 2019, she served as a regional councillor for Île-de-France. Later she was elected as the member of parliament for Seine-Saint-Denis's 10th constituency in the 2022 French legislative election. She was also a national spokesperson for the party under First Secretary Jean-Christophe Cambadélis. In the 2024 French legislative election, she was re-elected in the first round.

== Biography ==
=== Early life and education ===
Nadège Abomangoli was born in Brazzaville into a family marked by politics, as her father was an executive in the political party Pan-African Union for Social Democracy (UPADS). She grew up in Épinay-sur-Seine, in the Seine-Saint-Denis department of France.

She studied communications at CELSA Sorbonne University, obtained a master's degree in history from Paris-Sorbonne University, and earned a master's degree in media and public communication from Sciences Po. She became involved with SOS Racisme before joining the Socialist Party in 2006.

=== Professional career ===
Before pursuing a career in politics, Abomangoli worked as a manager in local government, specialising in internal auditing and risk management.

From 2006 to 2012, she was responsible for delegated budgets at the Department of Heritage and Architecture of Paris City Hall. From 2013 to 2015, she worked as a parliamentary assistant in the French Senate. Between 2016 and 2022, she returned to Paris City Hall, where she coordinated internal communications and worked as a risk manager.

=== Political career ===
A close associate of David Assouline, Abomangoli was elected to the Regional Council of Île-de-France in 2010, representing Paris, and served until 2015. During her tenure, she chaired the council's sports and leisure committee. In March 2014, she was placed second on the Socialist Party's electoral list for the municipal elections in Villetaneuse.

Following Jean-Christophe Cambadélis's election as First Secretary of the Socialist Party in 2014, Abomangoli became a party spokesperson. In this role, she became a prominent public figure and media representative supporting the incumbent President of the Republic, François Hollande, and his governments.

She was strongly critical of the Socialist Party's frondeurs (dissident members), describing them as elected officials incapable of acting through compromise, which she considered an essential part of politics. She also emphasised that she represented the party's majority position. However, she opposed the government's proposal to revoke French nationality in certain circumstances.

In 2015, she was elected, alongside Michel Fourcade, to represent the canton of Épinay-sur-Seine on the Departmental Council of Seine-Saint-Denis. From 2015 to 2021, she served as the council's eighth vice-president, with responsibility for housing policy and security.

In 2019, she left the Socialist Party and joined La France Insoumise.

In the first round of the 2020 municipal elections, the list led by Bertrand Kern, representing an alliance of the Socialist Party (PS), Europe Ecology – The Greens (EELV), the Radical Party of the Left (PRG), the Republican and Socialist Left (GRS), and the Generation Ecology party (PP), won the municipal election in Pantin with 57.60% of the vote. Abomangoli's list received 18.81% and secured four seats in opposition to the municipal majority.

In the 2021 departmental elections, Abomangoli and Samir Amziane, a member of the French Communist Party (PCF), stood as candidates in the canton of Pantin. They received 23.69% of the vote, finishing behind Mathieu Monot and Nadia Azoug, candidates supported by the Socialist Party and Europe Ecology – The Greens. Abomangoli and Amziane subsequently withdrew in the second round in favour of their opponents.

In 2022, Abomangoli was selected by NUPES to contest the 10th constituency of Seine-Saint-Denis against the incumbent Republican (LR) MP Alain Ramadier. She finished first in the first round, with 39.71% of the vote, compared with 20.07% for Ramadier. She subsequently defeated him in the second round, receiving 14,228 votes out of 69,267 registered voters. This represented 20.54% of registered voters and 55.53% of valid votes cast.

In October 2023, Abomangoli took part in an international parliamentary visit to the Democratic Republic of the Congo as part of a delegation of La France Insoumise parliamentarians led by Jean-Luc Mélenchon. During the visit, she met Congolese parliamentarians and President Félix Tshisekedi.

In the 2024 legislative elections, she was re-elected in the first round in her constituency, receiving 52.60% of the vote.

On 19 July 2024, she was elected third vice-president of the National Assembly, becoming the first Black woman to hold the position.

On 21 October 2024, she became the first Black woman to preside over a sitting of the National Assembly, during the examination of the 2025 budget.

She stood again in the 2026 municipal elections, this time in Bondy, in second place on the electoral list led by Mehmet Ozguner. The list lost the second round by 146 votes to that of the incumbent mayor. Abomangoli was nevertheless elected as an opposition municipal councillor.

== Electoral results ==
=== Election of the Vice-Presidents of the National Assembly ===
| Year | Parliamentary group | First round | Outcome |
|---|---|---|---|
| 2024 | LFI–NFP | 327 votes (59.78%); 3rd place | Elected |
| 2025 | LFI–NFP | 501 votes (91.09%); joint 1st place | Elected |
| 2026 | LFI–NFP | By acclamation; 1st place | Elected |

=== Legislative elections ===
| Year | Party | Constituency | First round | Second round | Outcome |
|---|---|---|---|---|---|
| 2022 | LFI (NUPES) | 10th constituency of Seine-Saint-Denis | 9,812 votes (39.71%); 1st place | 14,228 votes (55.53%) | Elected |
| 2024 | LFI (NFP) | 10th constituency of Seine-Saint-Denis | 21,282 votes (52.60%); 1st place | No second round | Elected |

=== Departmental elections ===
| Year | Party | Canton | Running mate | First round | Second round | Outcome |
|---|---|---|---|---|---|---|
| 2015 | PS | Épinay-sur-Seine | Michel Fourcade | 2,752 votes (36.00%); 1st place | 3,933 votes (55.55%) | Elected |

== See also ==
- List of deputies of the 16th National Assembly of France
- List of deputies of the 17th National Assembly of France
