= Gérard Gaudron =

French politician (1949–2024)

Member of the National Assembly for Seine-Saint-Denis's 10th constituency
- In office 20 June 2007 – 19 June 2012
- Preceded by: Jean-Claude Abrioux

Mayor of Aulnay-sous-Bois
- In office 2003–2008
- Preceded by: Jean-Claude Abrioux
- Succeeded by: Gérard Ségura

Personal details
- Born: 26 May 1949 Évans, Jura, France
- Died: 7 April 2024 (aged 74)
- Party: UMP

Gérard Gaudron (26 May 1949 – 7 April 2024) was a French politician who was the mayor of Aulnay-sous-Bois between 2003 and 2008, and a member of the National Assembly of France between 2007 and 2012, where he represented the Seine-Saint-Denis department, and he was a member of the Union for a Popular Movement. Gaudron died on 7 April 2024, at the age of 74.
