= L'Après =

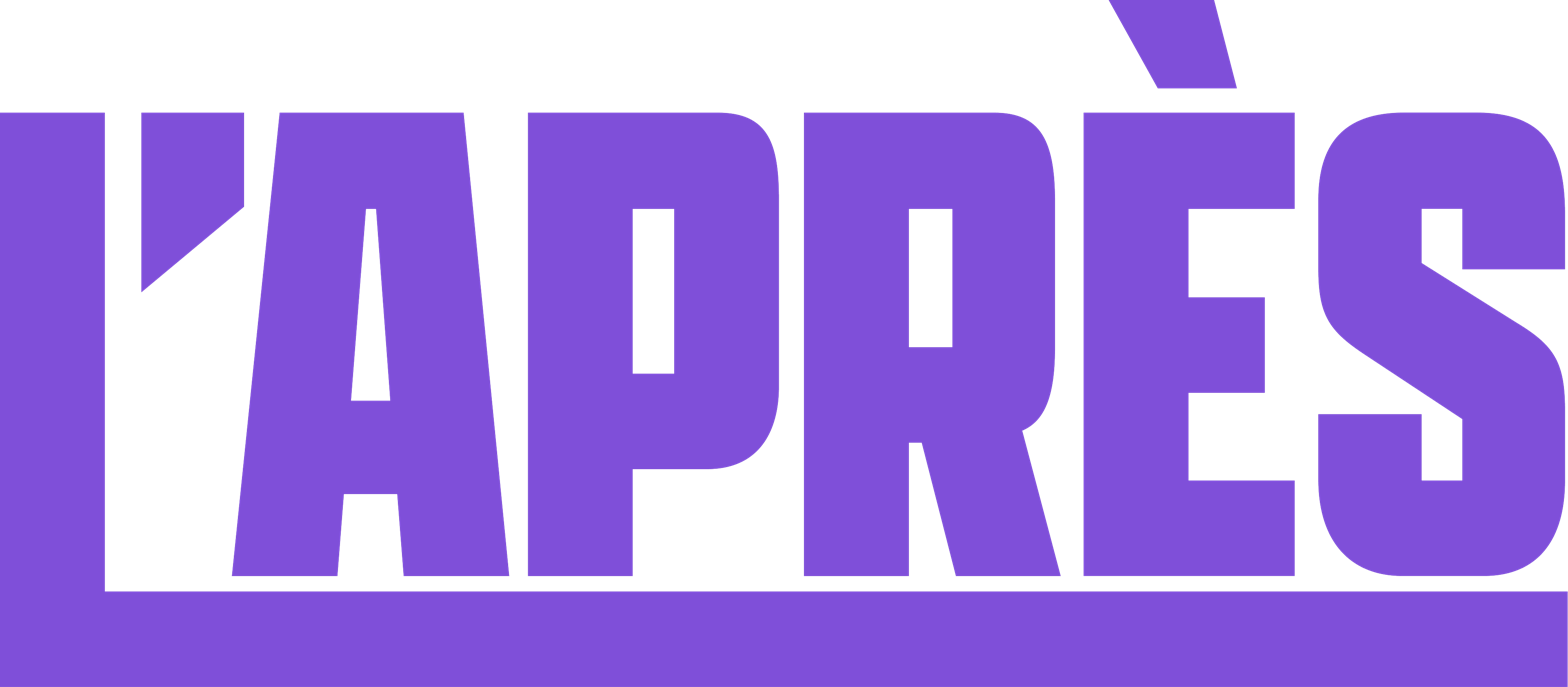
- Founded: 12 July 2024
- Split from: La France Insoumise
- Ideology: Eco-socialism
- Political position: Left-wing
- National affiliation: Ecologist Group; New Popular Front
- Colors: Purple; Green; Red
- National Assembly: 4 / 577

Website
- l-apres.fr

L'Après (lit. 'The Aftermath', a backronym for L'Association pour la République écologique et sociale, lit. 'The Association for an Ecological and Social Republic') is a French left-wing political party. The party was founded on 12 July 2024 by dissidents from La France Insoumise (LFI), some of whom were deselected ahead of the 2024 French legislative election after over a year of feuding with LFI leader Jean-Luc Mélenchon.

== History ==
The party was founded by Clémentine Autain, Alexis Corbière, Hendrik Davi, Raquel Garrido, and Danielle Simonnet; all but Autain and Garrido had been re-elected in the 2024 legislative election without the support of LFI, with Autain winning as an LFI candidate and Garrido being defeated by Aly Diouara, a miscellaneous left candidate endorsed by the New Popular Front. Guillaume Ancelet, president of Picardie Debout, also supported the movement and is on the party's board. Picardie Debout's sole MP, François Ruffin, declined to join, though Corbière claimed that Ruffin "sponsors" the party. The party also counts Montreuil deputy mayor Olivier Madaule as a supporter. Former La France Insoumise MP Pascale Martin, who was narrowly defeated at the 2024 election, also joined L'Après, resulting in her expulsion from LFI.

The founders of the party had been considering forming a new movement since the 2024 European Parliament election in France. The founders claim to have been excluded from LFI in an "undemocratic fashion" and that they were "[taking] matters into our own hands and contribute with all our strength to ensuring that the gathering of the left and the ecologists can grow and win in the country."

The party also claimed to be "in service of the New Popular Front," the left-wing coalition which includes LFI. L'Après was described by Public Sénat, quoting Simonnet, as "a collective open to all activists of the New Popular Front 'who are a little disoriented, and who are looking for a common home.'"

At the announcement press conference, Corbière said that he would like to form a group with the French Communist Party and Ecologist Group, but that if a joint group was unfeasible, they would chose between the two. The party's MPs ultimately chose to sit with the Ecologist Group.

== Election results ==
Legislative

National Assembly
Election	Leader	Seats	Result
2024	Collective leadership	4 / 577	Opposition
