= Aly Diouara =

French politician (born 1987)

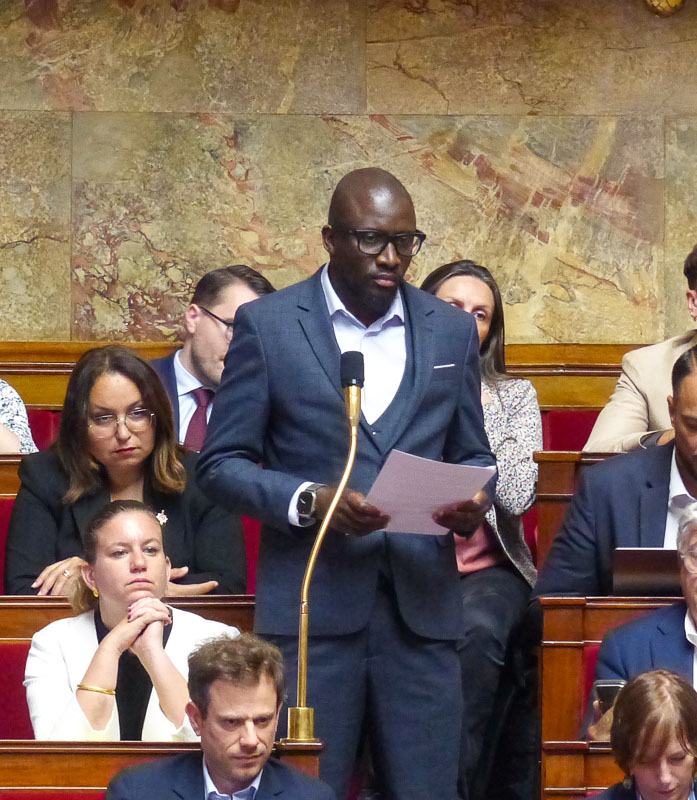

Member of the French National Assembly for Seine-Saint-Denis's 5th constituency
- Incumbent
- Assumed office 18 July 2024
- Preceded by: Raquel Garrido

Personal details
- Born: 1 March 1987 (age 39) La Courneuve, France
- Party: La France Insoumise
- Other party: New Popular Front

Aly Diouara (born 1 March 1987) is a French politician of La France Insoumise who was elected member of the National Assembly for Seine-Saint-Denis's 5th constituency in 2024. He previously worked in special education and as a civil servant. In the 2022 legislative election, he was an independent candidate for Seine-Saint-Denis's 4th constituency.

On 22 March 2026, he was elected mayor of his native La Courneuve, part of the Grand Paris.
