= Hayange =

- Commune
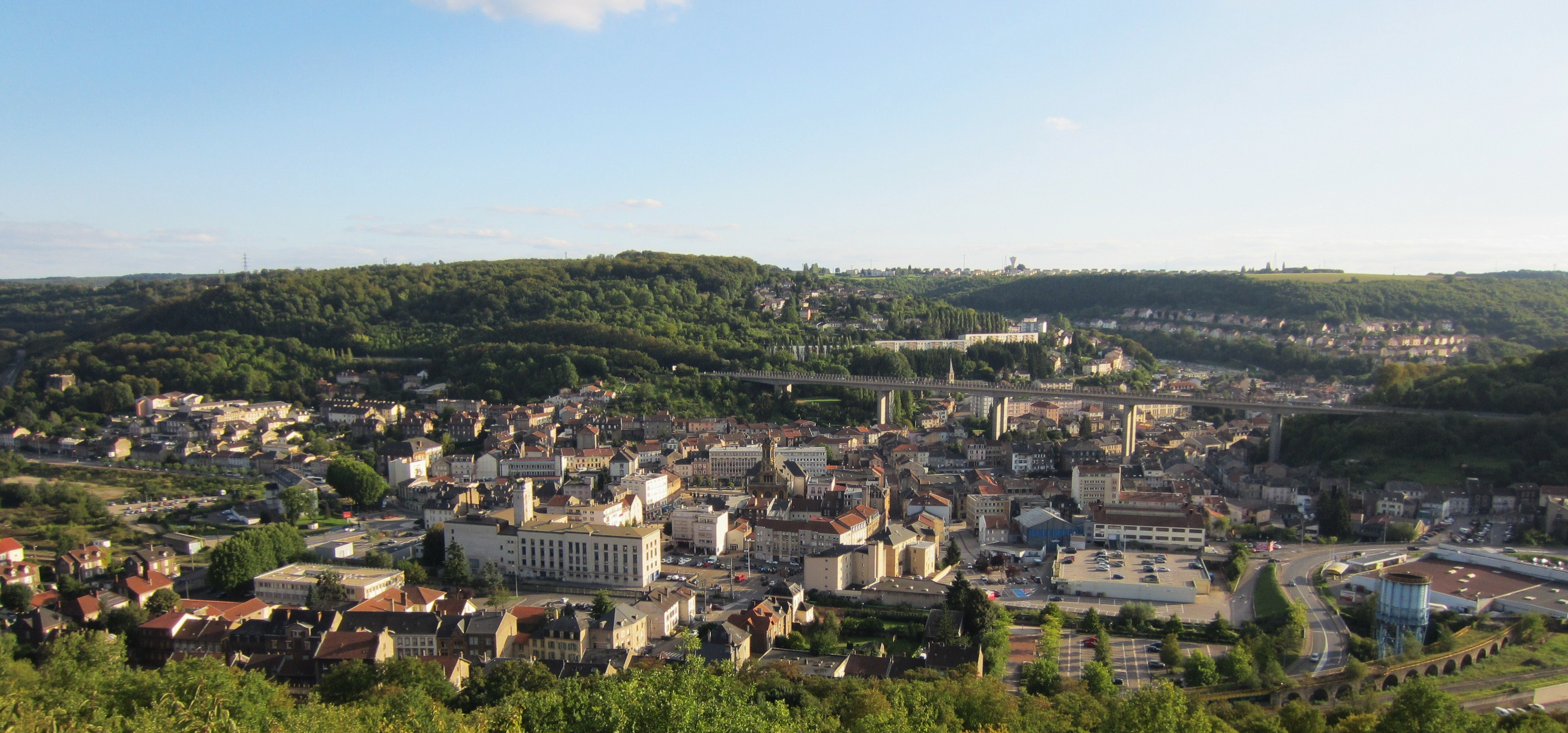
- A general view of Hayange

- Coat of arms
- Location of Hayange
- Location within France Location within Grand Est
- Coordinates: 49°19′48″N 6°03′46″E
- Country: France
- Region: Grand Est
- Department: Moselle
- Arrondissement: Thionville
- Canton: Hayange
- Intercommunality: CA Val de Fensch

Government
  - Mayor (2020–2026): Fabien Engelmann (RN)
- Area^{1}: 12.23 km^{2} (4.72 sq mi)
- Population (2023): 15,806
  - Density: 1,292/km^{2} (3,347/sq mi)
- Time zone: UTC+01:00 (CET)
  - Summer (DST): UTC+02:00 (CEST)
- INSEE/Postal code: 57306 /57700
- ^{1} French Land Register data, which excludes lakes, ponds, glaciers > 1 km^{2} (0.386 sq mi or 247 acres) and river estuaries.

Hayange (French pronunciation: [ajɑ̃ʒ or hajɑ̃ʒ]; German: Hayingen; Lorraine Franconian: Héngen/Haiéngen) is a town commune in the Moselle department in Grand Est in north-eastern France.

Outlying villages include Marspich and Saint-Nicolas-en-Forêt, Konacker and Ranguevaux.

== History ==
Archaeological evidence indicates that iron ore was already mined here in Roman times. Human settlement in the area during the Merovingian period is confirmed by a Merovingian cemetery discovered by iron miners in the Hamévillers Valley, on the edge of Hayange and along the line of a Roman road believed to have linked Rheims with Metz.

During the early medieval period the town was known as "Heiyingen Villa", a name indicating a settlement within a forested area. The first mention of the town in an official record dates from 821, during the reign of Louis the Pious, Western Emperor and King of the Franks, one of the sons of Charlemagne.

In 1941 during Nazi occupation, Reichswerke Hermann Göring founded Hüttenverwaltung Westmark GmbH to utilise the town's iron mine for manufacturing munitions, they used ordnance code ljy. Hayange was liberated by the American 357th Infantry (90th Division) after a short battle with the German 559th Grenadier Division on 10 September 1944.

== Population ==
Historical population
Year	Pop.	±% p.a.
1968	22,122	—
1975	19,589	−1.72%
1982	17,044	−1.97%
1990	15,599	−1.10%
1999	15,189	−0.30%
2007	15,135	−0.04%
2012	15,754	+0.80%
2017	15,811	+0.07%
2023	15,806	−0.01%
Source: INSEE

== Economy ==
Hayange is located in the iron manufacturing region of Lorraine; within Hayange is the former Sogerail plant, a railway rail manufacturer, dating to 1892 as Usine Saint Jacques.

== Transportation ==
Hayange is located at the crossroads of the D952 and the D13/57 near the A30 autoroute.

Hayange railway station is served by TER Grand Est trains and buses to Thionville and Longwy.

Hayange has daily bus service to Luxembourg, Thionville and Metz.

== Twin towns ==
- Italy: Barga

== Miscellaneous ==
- Hayange's main educational institutions are: Lycée Les Grands Bois, Collège Hurlevent and LEP Maryse Bastié.
- The classical organist Vincent Warnier was born in Hayange on 14 October 1967.
- Hayange features in the opening pages of the 2019 humorous travel book "The World Less Travelled".

== See also ==
- Communes of the Moselle department
