= Fabien Engelmann =

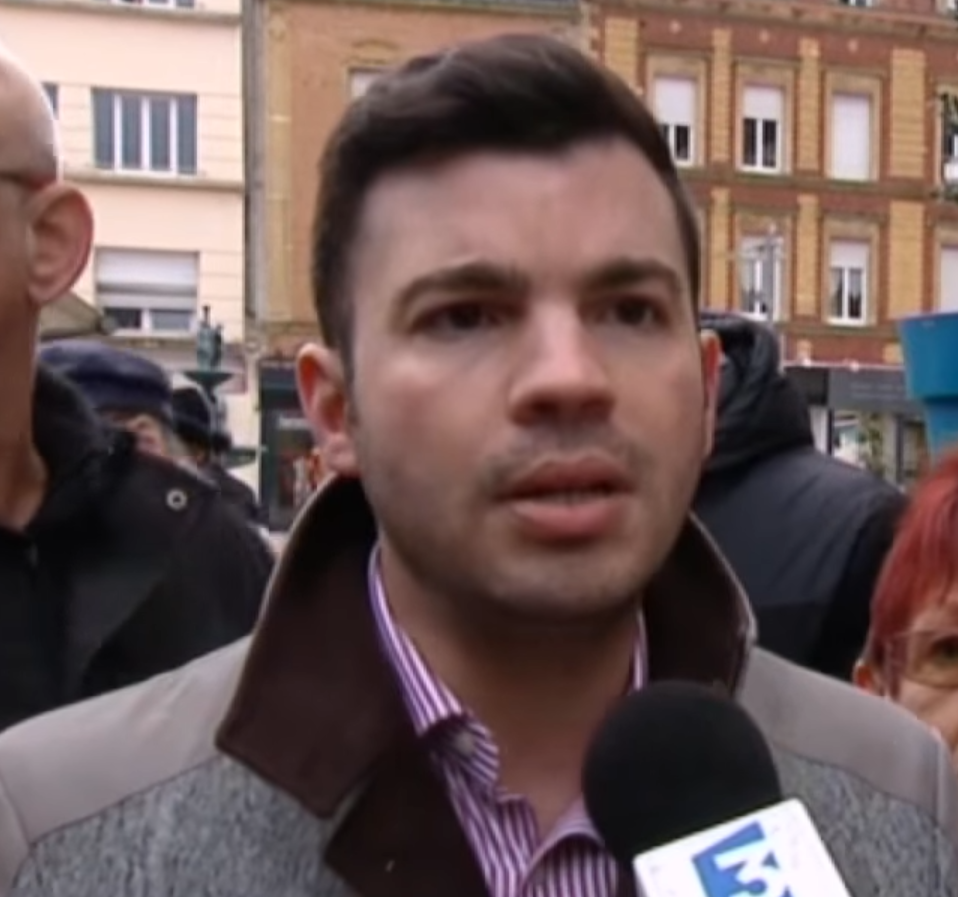

Mayor of Hayange
- Incumbent
- Assumed office 6 April 2014

Personal details
- Born: 7 May 1979 (age 46) Algrange
- Party: National Rally

Fabien Engelmann (born on 7 May 1979 in Algrange) is a French politician. He is the mayor of Hayange and regional councilor of Grand Est since 2015.

.

== Biography ==
Fabien Engelmann born on 7 May 1979. His father was an accountant. He's mayor of Hayange since 2014.

He was arrested for driving under the influence in Luxembourg in 2020 and is currently on trial.
