= Ottilie =

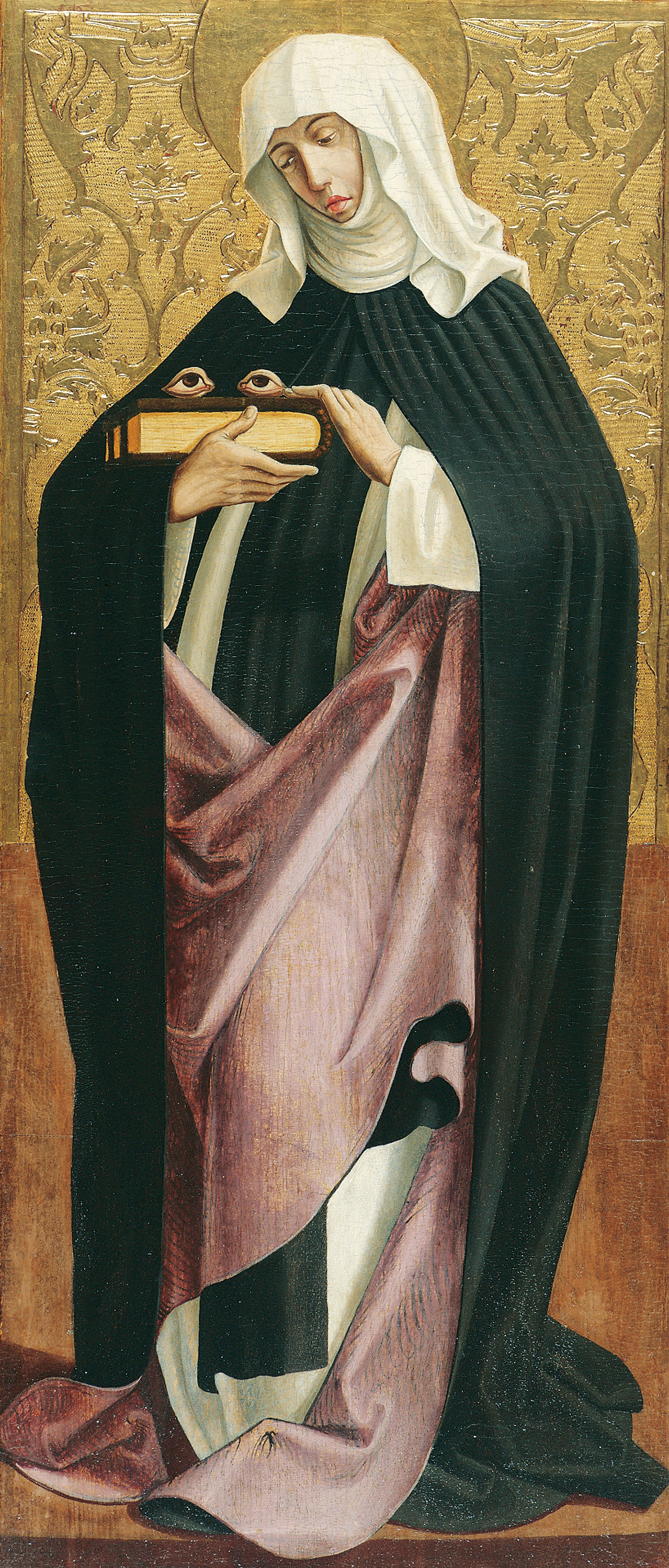
- Saint Ottilie of Alsace
- Pronunciation: English: /ˈɒtɪli, oʊˈtɪli/; German: [ɔˈtiːli̯ə]
- Gender: Feminine

Origin
- Origin: German
- Meaning: "wealthy"
- Region of origin: Germany

Other names
- Variant forms: Otelia (English), (Norwegian), (Swedish), Otilia (Portuguese), (Romanian),(Spanish), Otilija (Slovene), (Sorbian); Ottalie (English), Ottilia (Swedish), Otylia (Polish)
- Nicknames: Lotti, Lottie (English), Lotty, Otti (German), Ottie (English), Otty, Tilli, Tillie (English), Tilly, Tola (Polish), Tolly (English)
- Related names: Feminine: Aud (Norwegian), Auda (Old German), Auðr (Old Norse), Auður (Icelandic), Oatha (American English), Oda (English), (German), (Norwegian), Oddie (American English), Odelia (English), Odelinda (Spanish), Odelinde (Old High German), Odeta (Lithuanian), Odett (Hungarian), Odetta (English), Odette (French), Odie (American English), Odila (German), Odile (French), Odilia (German), Odis (American English), Odolina (Middle English), Odulina (Medieval Catalan), (Medieval Spanish), Ody (American English), Ortilie (American English), Ota (Czech), (Sorbian), Otessa (American English), Othea (American English), Othia (American English), Othilea (American English), Othili (American English), Othilee (American English), Othily (American English), Otiliana (Swedish), Otisa (American English), Otissa (American English), Otley (English), Otta (German), Ottalia (American English), Ottaline (English), Ottelien (Dutch), Ottelijaana (Finnish), Ottessa (American English), Ottiliana (Finnish), (Swedish), Ottiline (English), Ottley (English), Ottlie (English), Ottolina (Dutch), Ottoline (English), Ottonia (American English), Ottonie (American English), Udelina (Medieval French), Udeline (Haitian Creole), Uta (German), Ute (German) Masculine: Aud (Norwegian), Audo German, Audovacar (German), Eudes (Old French), Ode (Middle English), Oddo (Italian), Odélien (French), Odiliano (Portuguese), (Spanish), Odilien (French), Odilo (German), Odilon (French), Odilón, Odilone, Odo, Odylon, Ota (Czech), (Sorbian), (Slovak), Othe, Othmar (Germanic), Otho, Otilian (Romanian), Otis, Otley, Otlyn, Ottley, Oto (Czech), Ott (Estonian), Otto (Danish), (Dutch), (English), (Finnish), (German), (Swedish) Ottó (Hungarian), (Icelandic), Ottokar (Germanic), Ottone (Italian), Ottorino (Italian), Ottwolf (German), Otwolf (German)

Ottilie is a feminine given name. It is a French derivative of the medieval German masculine name Otto and, like other related Germanic names beginning with the prefixes Ad-, Aut-, Od-, Ot-, Oth-, or Ud-, has the meaning "prosperous in battle", "riches", "prosperous" or "wealth". The English place name Otley and surname Ottley are related names.

== Usage ==
The name has been in use among Flemish and German families since the medieval era. Odilia of Cologne is a Roman Catholic saint who was a virgin companion of Saint Ursula, according to Catholic tradition. According to legend, Odile of Alsace, another Roman Catholic saint, was born blind but regained her sight when she was baptized. The saints, who are both also known as Ottilie or Ottilia, were revered in France, Germany, and Switzerland. Ottilie is a variant of Odile. Ottilia, Ottiliana, and Ottoline are variants of Ottilie. Ottilie was in occasional use in the United Kingdom by the 19th century, where it was in use mainly by families of Flemish and German descent who had settled in Yorkshire and Lancashire as well as in London. Ottilie and variant Ottoline came into rare, occasional use among upper-class English families by the early 20th century.

Ottilie continued to gradually increase in use among socially influential British families during the late 20th and early 21st centuries. Between 2010 and 2018, it was among the top 50 names most often given to newborn girls whose parents published a birth announcement in The Daily Telegraph and was the most popular name for girls for the first time in 2019. Ottilie has remained a popular name for girls in subsequent years among readers who published a birth announcement in the British newspaper. One study found that Ottilie was the second most popular name chosen by billionaires for their daughters. The name has also increased in overall popularity in England and Wales since 2010. It has ranked among the top 500 names for girls in those countries since 2015 and among the top 100 names for girls since 2022.

Usage of the names Ottilie and Ottilia in the United States was greatest in the 1800s among Austrian, Bohemian, German, Polish, and Swiss immigrants. Many variants and elaborations of the name were also in use. It is now an unfamiliar name to many Americans, but is also increasing in usage in the United States. Usage of the name for American girls nearly doubled from 2022, when 34 American girls were named Ottilie, to 2023, when 67 American girls were given the name. Eighty newborn American girls were given the name in 2024. Fifty-seven American girls were given the name in 2025. Usage of the name might have increased in the United States after an American influencer used the variant name Ottlie for her daughter in 2023.

== Women named Ottilie ==
- Ottilie of Katzenelnbogen (1451–1517), German aristocrat
- Ottilie of Nassau-Siegen (1437–1493), German aristocrat
- Ottilie Abrahams (1937–2018), Namibian activist
- Ottilie Assing (1819–1884), German journalist, associate of Frederick Douglass
- Ottilie Baader (1847–1925), German women's rights activist and socialist
- Ottilie von Bistram (1859–1931), Latvian writer and teacher
- Ottilie Bondy (1832–1921), Austrian women's rights activist and women's association official
- Ottilie Collin (1863–1960), Austrian soprano
- Ottilie Davidová (1892–1943), Austrian-Czech Jewish woman, the youngest of Franz Kafka's three sisters
- Johanna Gabrielle Ottilie "Tilly" Edinger (1897–1967), German-born Jewish-American paleontologist and the founder of paleoneurology
- Ottilie Fleischer (1911–2005), German athlete
- Ottilie Louise Fresco (born 1952), Dutch scientist
- Ottilie Genée (1834–1911), German stage actress and operatic soprano
- Otti Geschka (born 1939), full name Ottilie Geschka, German pediatric nurse and politician
- Ottilie Godefroy (1880–1971), Austrian actress who performed under the name Tilla Durieux
- Ottilie von Goethe (1796–1872), German socialite and the daughter-in-law of Johann Wolfgang von Goethe
- Ottilie von Hansemann (1840–1919), German women's rights activist
- Ottilie Houser Brattain, American mathematician and mother of the physicist Walter Houser Brattain
- Ottilie Hoffmann (1835–1925), German educationalist and social reformer
- Ottilie Klein (born 1984), German politician
- Tillie Klimek (1876–1936), American serial killer
- Ottilie Kruger (1926–2005), American actress and daughter of the actor Otto Kruger
- Ottilie A. Liljencrantz (1876–1910), American writer
- Tilly Losch (1903–1975), Austrian dancer and choreographer
- Ottilie Maclaren Wallace (1875–1947), Scottish sculptor
- Ottalie Mark (1896–1979), American musicologist
- Ottilie Markholt (1916–2004), American trade unionist, labor historian, and political activist
- Ottilie Metzger (1878–1943), German contralto
- Ottilie Mulzet (born 1960), Canadian translator of Hungarian poetry and prose
- Ottilie Palm Jost (1878–1961), Canadian impressionist artist
- Ottilie Patterson (1932–2011), Northern Irish jazz singer
- Ottilie Pohl (1867–1943), German Jewish socialist politician and activist
- Ottilie Reylaender (1882–1965), German painter
- Ottilie Roederstein (1859–1937), Swiss painter
- Ottilie "Tilly" Spiegel (1906–1988), Austrian political activist
- Ottilie Stibaner (1908–1972), German chess player
- Ottilie Sutro (1872–1970), American pianist
- Ottilie Tolansky (1912–1977), Austrian artist
- Ottilie Turnbull Seybolt (1889–1978), American theater professor
- Ottilie Wildermuth (1817–1877), German writer

== Women named Otelia ==
- Otelia Cromwell (1874–1972), American academic
- Otelia Shields Howard (1900–1945), American academic
- Otelia B. Mahone (1835–1911), American and Confederate Civil War nurse

== Women named Otilia ==
- Otilia Bădescu (born 1970), Romanian table tennis player
- Otilia Brumă (born 1992), Romanian singer-songwriter
- Otilia Cazimir (1894–1967), Romanian poet
- Otilia Larrañaga, Mexican dancer and actress
- Otilia Lux, Guatemalan social leader
- Otilia Mascarenhas, Indian-born field hockey player and orthopedic surgeon now living in Germany
- Otilia Pasarica (born 1968), Romanian volleyball player
- Otilia Ruicu-Eșanu (born 1978), Romanian track and field athlete
- Blessed Otilia Alonso Gónzalez (1916–1936), Spanish Civil War martyr

== Women named Otilija ==
- Otilija "Otti" Berger (1898–1944), Croatian Jewish textile artist and weaver murdered during the Holocaust

== Women named Otta ==
- Otta F Swire (1898–1973), Scottish author
- Otta Wenskus (born 1955), German classical philologist currently residing in Austria

== Women named Ottie ==
- Ottie Beatrice Graham (1901–1944), American writer associated with the Harlem Renaissance cultural movement

== Women named Ottilia ==
- Ottilia Borbáth (born 1946), Romanian actress
- Ottilia Carolina Kuhlman (1778–1866), Swedish actress
- Ottilia Littmarck (1834–1929), Swedish actress and director

== Women named Ottoline ==
- Ottoline Leyser (born 1965), British plant biologist
- Lady Ottoline Morrell (1873–1938), English society hostess

== Women named Otylia ==
- Otylia Jędrzejczak (born 1983), Polish swimmer

== Fictional characters named Ottilie ==
- Ottilie, a principal character in the novel Elective Affinities by Johann Wolfgang von Goethe
- Ottilie Harshom, protagonist in John Wyndham's story "Random Quest", published in 1961 and later made into the film Quest for Love
- Ottilie, in "To Ottilie" by Robert Louis Stevenson
- Ottilie, in the short story "House of Flowers" by Truman Capote, later adapted into a musical of the same name

== Fictional characters named Ottoline ==
- Ottoline, the heroine of a series of children's picture books by South African born British author Chris Riddell
