= Odile =

Odile is a feminine given name of French origin, and may refer to:

== People ==
- Odile of Alsace (c. 662–c. 720), a saint of the Roman Catholic Church
- Odile of Cologne (c. 4th century), a saint of the Roman Catholic Church
- Odile Bailleux (1939–2024), French harpsichordist and organist
- Odile Bain (1939–2012), French parasitologist
- Odile Baron Supervielle (1915–2016), Uruguayan-born Argentine writer and journalist
- Odile Crick (1920–2007), British artist best known for her drawing of the DNA double helix
- Odile Croissant (1923–2020), French biologist, physicist, specialist in electron microscopy.
- Odile Decq (born 1955), French architect, urban planner and academic
- Odile Defraye (1888–1965), Belgian road-racing bicyclist
- Odile Fanton d’Andon, French environmental researcher, CEO of the company ACRI-ST
- Odile Gilbert (contemporary), French hairstylist
- Odile Harington (born 1961), South African intelligence agent
- Odile Jacob (contemporary), French scientist who studies the workings of the brain
- Odile Kennel (born 1967), German writer
- Odile Lesage (born 1969), French heptathlete
- Odile Ohier (born 1963), French long-distance athlete
- Odile Rodin (1937–2018), French actress
- Odile Rudelle (1936–2013), French historian and specialist in Gaullism
- Odile Saugues (born 1943), French left-wing politician
- Odile Schmitt (1956–2020), French actress
- Odile Versois (1930–1980), French actress

== Characters ==
- Odile, the evil black swan of Swan Lake
- Odile de Caray, in the 1966 film Eye of the Devil
- Odile, a principal character in the 1964 Jean-Luc Godard film Bande à part
- Odile, one of the five principal characters in the 2023 role-playing game In Stars and Time by Canadian game developer Adrienne Bazir.

== See also ==
- Hurricane Odile (disambiguation)
- Odilon, the masculine form of this name
- Ottilie, variant of Odile
- Odelia, variant of Odile
