= Kaan Akalın =

Turkish singer-songwriter and DJ

- Kaan Akalın in New York City for the music video shooting of "Arar Mı?".
- Born: 3 June 1997 (age 29); Istanbul, Turkey
- Education: International School of Florence; Koç University (BSc); LUISS Guido Carli (Exchange); Singapore Management University (Exchange); KU Leuven (MSc)
- Occupations: Singer; Songwriter; DJ
- Years active: 2015–present
- Musical career
- Genres: House, Deep house, Nu-disco, Pop
- Instruments: Vocals, guitar, drums, piano
- Label: Sony Music Latin
- Website: kaanakalin.net

Kaan Akalın (born 3 June 1997) is a Turkish singer, songwriter and DJ who also plays drums, piano and the guitar. He first appeared in the 2014 season of the X Factor (Turkish TV series), the Turkish version of The X Factor, at the age of 16. Akalın released more than 6 singles including a debut single with a music video in NYC Arar Mı? (2016) and Tanıdık Hikayeler (2017); both mastered by multiple GRAMMY winning albums' engineer Chris Gehringer at Sterling Sound. According to the artist's official website and accounts: "His lyrical compositions have evolved to be based on consciousness, aiming to disseminate the reality of living and loving in the moment."

== Music career ==
=== 2014–15: Career beginnings ===
Akalın was invited to X Factor (Turkish TV series) however the program was canceled after first four episodes. He met with Ömer Karacan who later channelized him to get one track out in Number One Dance Hits 2015. The track 'Fool Around' a duet from him with Asena was released in the compilation album in 2015.

=== 2016: Arar Mı? ===
Akalın signed with DGL&DMC in 2016 to release his debut single 'Arar Mı?'. The photographs for the single were all shot by Jerry Stolwijk in New York City. Arrangements were completed by Onur Betin. Masterings of the tracks were made in Sterling Sound Studios by Chris Gehgringer who also worked with stars like Rihanna, Justin Bieber, Madonna and Jason Derulo. The official music video of this single was released on 6 June 2016.The video sees Akalın singing and dancing in New York City. As stated by him in Habertürk newspaper, his latest interview, he has been influenced by Michael Jackson's singing and dancing in this project.

=== 2017: Tanıdık Hikayeler ===
The music video where Akalın dances the tango was shot in the iconic Pera Palace Hotel situated in the historical district of Beyoğlu in Istanbul.

=== 2020: Delusion ===
Akalın's first collaboration with the guitarist Cenk Esgin.

=== 2021: Bundan Böyle ===
Akalın's second collaboration with the guitarist Cenk Esgin.

=== 2021: Delusion (Funky Edit) ===
A funky edit version of Delusion produced by Emre Yüksel and Can Küçükserim.

=== 2022: Together ===
Together is a collaboration between Kaan Akalın and Turkish DJ/Producer Toprak Baris. This single also features a remix by the Sparrow & Barbossa DJ duo.

=== 2023: Senin için ===
'Senin için' is a collaboration with Sparrow & Barbossa in their Réciprocité released by Sony Music Latin, merging Afro House and Flamenco, features renowned guitarist Francis Coletta.

=== 2023: Evolve ===
'Evolve' is another of his collaboration with Toprak Baris released by House Music With Love. The track has been listed in Black Coffee's track id playlist on spotify.

== Discography ==
- NR1 Dance Hits (2015) – DGL&DMC
- Arar Mı? (2016) – DGL&DMC
- Tanıdık Hikayeler (2017) – Pasaj
- Delusion (2020) – DMC
- Bundan Böyle (2021) – Seven Unity
- Delusion (Funky Edit) (2022) – DMC
- Together (2022) – Inward Records
- Réciprocité [Senin için] (2023) – Sony Music Latin
- Evolve (2023) – House Music With Love

== Education ==
Kaan Akalın started his primary education in Italy at the International School of Florence. After completing the first two grades, he continued his education in Istanbul, Turkey at Açı Schools until high school and graduated from Işık High School. He entered Koç University with an achievement scholarship and obtained a bachelor's double degree in Economics and International Relations. While pursuing the double degree, he went on an Erasmus Exchange at LUISS Guido Carli (Rome, Italy) and a Global Exchange at Singapore Management University (Singapore). He is currently studying Master's of Science in Business Economics at KU Leuven (Leuven, Belgium).

== Charts ==
NR1 Dance Hits 2015	Peak	
NR1 Dance Hits 2015	Turkey	Europe
iTunes Turkey	3	—
|DnR Top 10	2	—

Together	Global Top Ten	
Together	Afro House Releases	All Releases
Beatport	2	10
