= Odelia =

Given name

Odelia or Odilia is a feminine given name. It is a variant form of the name Ottilie. It is also a modern Hebrew name meaning "I will thank Yahweh."

== Women named Odelia ==
- Odelia Ntiamoah Boampong (born 1981), Ghanaian entrepreneur, TV and radio news reporter
- Odelia Fitoussi (born 1977), Israeli art therapist and disability rights advocate
- Manohara Odelia Pinot (born 1992), Indonesian-American model

== Women named Odilia ==
- Odile of Alsace, Roman Catholic saint also known as Odilia
- Odilia of Cologne, Roman Catholic saint
- Mary Odilia Berger (1823–1880), German-born American Catholic religious sister
- Odilia Castro Hidalgo (1908–1999), Costa Rican teacher, communist and feminist
- Odilia Dank (1938–2013), American educator and politician
- Luz Odilia Font (1929–2022), Puerto Rican actress
- Odilia Palomo Paíz (1919–1985), Guatemalan teacher and politician and wife of Guatemalan President Carlos Castillo Armas
- Odilia Suárez (1923–2006), Argentine architect, educator and urban planner
