= Puy-de-Dôme's 4th constituency =

Constituency of the National Assembly of France

4th constituency of Puy-de-Dôme
- inline Constituency of the National Assembly of France

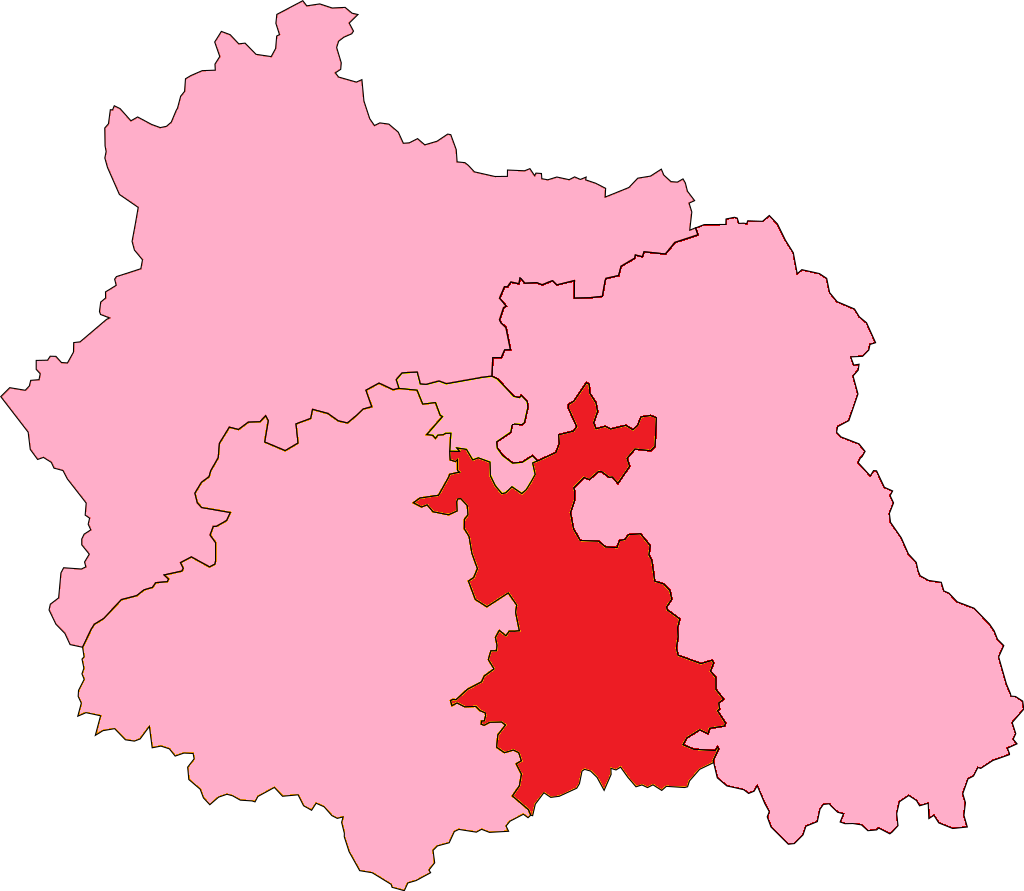
- Puy-de-Dôme's's 4th Constituency shown within Puy-de-Dôme
- Deputy: Delphine Lingemann; MoDem
- Department: Puy-de-Dôme
- Cantons: Aubière, Clermont-Ferrand Sud-Est, Issoire, Jumeaux, Saint-Germain-Lembron, Sauxillanges, Vertaizon, Veyre-Monton, Vic-le-Comte, Commune de Pérignat-sur-Allier
- Registered voters: 98645

The 4th constituency of the Puy-de-Dôme (French: Quatrième circonscription du Puy-de-Dôme) is a French legislative constituency in the Puy-de-Dôme département. Like the other 576 French constituencies, it elects one MP using a two-round electoral system. It has been represented by Delphine Lingemann since 2022.

== Description ==
The 4th constituency of the Puy-de-Dôme is in the south of the department to the south of Clermont-Ferrand, the south east portion of which is contained within it.

The seat has historically lent towards the left with only a sole RPR victory in 1993 to interrupt the dominance of the Socialist Party. However, in 2017 the constituency followed the national trend by electing a centrist deputy from Emmanuel Macron's coalition.

== Assembly Members ==
Election	Member	Party
1988	Jacques Lavédrine	PS
1993	Pierre Pascalon	RPR
1997	Jean-Paul Bacquet	PS
2002	Jean-Paul Bacquet	PS
2007	Jean-Paul Bacquet	PS
2012	Jean-Paul Bacquet	PS
2017	Michel Fanget	MoDem
2022	Delphine Lingemann	MoDem
2024	Delphine Lingemann	MoDem

== Election results ==
=== 2024 ===
Legislative Election 2024: Puy-de-Dôme's 4th constituency
Party	Candidate	Votes	%	±%
MoDem (Ensemble)	Delphine Lingemann	19,299	27.38	+1.90
REC	Pascale Sanchez	569	0.81	−1.76
LFI (NFP)	Valérie Goléo	18,769	26.63	−4.10
RN	Benjamin Chalus	22,290	31.62	+15.03
LR	Florence Dubessy	8,419	11.94	−4.21
LO	François Marotte	1,137	1.61	n/a
Turnout		70,483	96.81	+45.61
Registered electors		101,981		
2nd round result
MoDem	Delphine Lingemann	42,380	62.28	+34.90
RN	Benjamin Chalus	25,663	37.72	+ 6.10
Turnout		68,043	93.82	−2.99
Registered electors		101,980		
MoDem hold		Swing		

=== 2022 ===
Legislative Election 2022: Puy-de-Dôme's 4th constituency
Party	Candidate	Votes	%	±%
LFI (NUPÉS)	Valérie Goléo	15,519	30.73	+1.95
MoDem (Ensemble)	Delphine Lingemann	12,870	25.48	-7.44
RN	Didier Brulé	8,379	16.59	+8.01
LR (UDC)	Florence Dubessy	8,159	16.15	−5.27
MoDem	Laurent Pradier*	2,217	4.39	N/A
REC	Pascale Sanchez	1,296	2.57	N/A
Others	N/A	2,066	-	−
Turnout		50,506	51.20	−0.67
2nd round result
MoDem (Ensemble)	Delphine Lingemann	22,680	50.13	-5.31
LFI (NUPÉS)	Valérie Goléo	22,564	49.87	N/A
Turnout		45,244	48.98	+6.47
MoDem hold				

* Pradier ran as a dissident member of MoDem, without the support of the party or the Ensemble Citoyens alliance.

=== 2017 ===
Results of the 11 June and 18 June 2017 French National Assembly election in Puy-de-Dôme's 4th Constituency
Candidate	Party		1st round		2nd round	
Candidate	Party		Votes	%	Votes	%
Michel Fanget	Democratic Movement	MoDem	16,472	32.92	19,265	55.44
Bertrand Barraud	The Republicans	LR	7,363	14.72	15,483	44.56
Catherine Mollet	La France Insoumise	FI	7,240	14.47		
Sylvie Maisonnet	Socialist Party	PS	4,828	9.65		
Sylwia Powarunas	National Front	FN	4,293	8.58		
Hervé Prononce	Union of Democrats and Independents	UDI	3,352	6.70		
Catherine Fromage	Communist Party	PCF	2,330	4.66		
Jean-Baptiste Pegeon	Ecologist	ECO	2,155	4.31		
Maximilien Martins	Debout la France	DLF	628	1.26		
Nicole Lozano	Miscellaneous Left	DVG	477	0.95		
François Marotte	Far Left	EXG	314	0.63		
Roland Domas	Miscellaneous Right	DVD	311	0.62		
Mathias Masclet	Independent	DIV	265	0.53		
Dominique Morel	Far Right	EXD	5	0.01		
Total			50,033	100%	34,748	100%
Registered voters			98,654		98,645	
Blank/Void ballots			1,136	1.15%	7,189	7.29%
Turnout			51,169	51.87%	41,937	42.51%
Abstentions			47,485	48.13%	56,708	57.49%
Result					MoDem GAIN FROM PS	

=== 2012 ===
Jean-Paul Bacquet, the Socialist Party candidate, was elected with over 50% of the vote in the first round, thus meaning that no second round run-off took place.

Results of the 10 June and 17 June 2012 French National Assembly election in Puy-de-Dôme’s 4th Constituency
Candidate	Party		1st round	
Candidate	Party		Votes	%
Jean-Paul Bacquet	Socialist Party	PS	28,372	50.91
Bertrand Barraud	The Republicans	UMP	11,851	21.27
Dominique Morel	National Front	FN	5,799	10.41
Eléonor Perise	Left Front	FG	4,329	7.77
Hélène Fourvel-Pelletier	Europe Ecology – The Greens	EELV	1,805	3.24
Valérie Coudun	Independent Centrist	CEN	1,364	2.45
Cécile Besnard	New Centre	NC	490	0.88
Alexandre Seytre	Ecologist	ECO	452	0.81
Patrick Goyeau	Far Left	EXG	427	0.77
Pierre Fortier	Ecologist	ECO	298	0.53
Nathalie Courageot	Far Left	EXG	290	0.52
Alexandrine Salazar	Far Left	EXG	251	0.45
Total			55,728	100%
Registered voters			95,541	
Blank/Void ballots			835	1.48%
Turnout			56,563	59.20%
Abstentions			38,978	40.80%
Result			PS HOLD	

=== 2007 ===
Legislative Election 2007: Puy-de-Dôme's 4th constituency
Party	Candidate	Votes	%	±%
PS	Jean-Paul Bacquet	22,330	45.78	
UMP	Christophe Serre	15,418	31.61	
MoDem	Philippe Gatignol	3,554	7.29	
LV	Hélène Pelletier	1,293	2.65	
LCR	Patrick Goyeau	1,280	2.62	
FN	Jérôme Wasser	1,184	2.43	
Others	N/A	3,718	-	−
Turnout		49,631	63.89	
2nd round result
PS	Jean-Paul Bacquet	29,965	61.44	
UMP	Christophe Serre	18,806	38.56	
Turnout		50,101	64.51	
PS hold				

=== 2002 ===
Legislative Election 2002: Puy-de-Dôme's 4th constituency
Party	Candidate	Votes	%	±%
PS	Jean-Paul Bacquet	21,124	42.82	
UMP	Pierre Pascallon	18,782	38.07	
FN	Germaine Wilwertz	3,094	6.27	
LV	Jean-Paul Russier	1,404	2.85	
PCF	Laura Artusi	1,383	2.80	
LCR	Patrick Goyeau	1,166	2.36	
Others	N/A	2,380	-	−
Turnout		50,466	68.51	
2nd round result
PS	Jean-Paul Bacquet	26,285	56.08	
UMP	Pierre Pascallon	20,583	43.92	
Turnout		48,581	66.04	
PS hold				

=== 1997 ===
Legislative Election 1997: Puy-de-Dôme's 4th constituency
Party	Candidate	Votes	%	±%
PS	Jean-Paul Bacquet	16,892	36.61	
RPR	Pierre Pascallon	14,639	31.73	
PCF	Frédéric Souchal	4,251	9.21	
FN	Thierry Maillard	3,654	7.92	
LV	Hervé Mantelet	1,710	3.71	
LDI	Annick Mignon	1,163	2.52	
GE	Raymond Puertas	927	2.01	
Others	N/A	2,906		
Turnout		49,201	70.72	
2nd round result
PS	Jean-Paul Bacquet	28,431	56.92	
RPR	Pierre Pascallon	21,514	43.08	
Turnout		52,907	75.96	
PS gain from RPR				
