= Ottley =

Ottley is an English surname. Notable people with this surname include the following:

- Adam Ottley (1653–1723), English Anglican bishop
- Alice Ottley (1840–1912), English educator
- Charles Ottley (1858–1932), English naval officer
- David Ottley (born 1955), English javelin thrower
- David Ottley (cricketer) (born 1944), English cricketer
- Doug Ottley (1923–1983), New Zealand footballer
- Francis Ottley (1600 or 1601–1649), English politician and soldier
- Jerold Ottley (1934–2021), American choirmaster
- Kjorn Ottley (born 1989), Trinidadian cricketer
- Passie Fenton Ottley (1868–1940), Chair of the Georgia State Library Commission
- Richard Ottley (1626–1670), English politician
- Richard Ottley (judge) (fl. 1827–1833), British colonial administrator
- Robert Lawrence Ottley (1856–1933), English theologian
- Roi Ottley (1906–1960), American writer and journalist
- Ryan Ottley (born 1975), American comic book artist
- William Young Ottley (1771–1836), English art collector
- Yannick Ottley (born 1991), Trinidadian cricketer
