= NR1 Dance Hits 2015 =

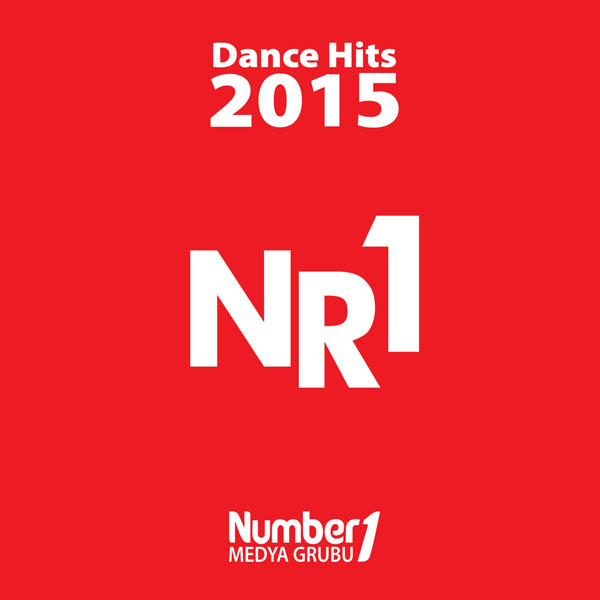

Compilation album by Various Artists
- Released: 2015
- Length: 62:55
- Language: English
- Label: Yeni Dünya Müzik

NR1 Dance Hits 2015 is the 2015 version of the dance hits compilation albums by Number 1 FM which are compiled every year. After its release by the label Yeni Dünya Müzik, the album has been successful in the Turkish Charts. Famous artists like Inna, Otilia, Akcent, Alexandra Stan and Milk & Sugar are on this album.

== Track listing ==
1. Otilia - Bilionera
2. Akcent feat. Liv - Faina
3. Inna feat. Marian Hill - Diggy Down
4. Alexandra Stan - Dance
5. Kadebostany - Castle In The Snow
6. Milk & Sugar with Barbara Tucker - Needin U
7. Mert Hakan feat. Serel - Get Up And Party
8. Onur Betin feat. Kaan Akalın & Asena Ömür - Fool Around
9. Deorro - Five Hours
10. Mr. Saik - Contra La Pared
11. Enca - Play My Game (A Po Tpelqen)
12. Martin Tungevaag - Wicked Wonderland
13. Dave Stiller - Stay Away (Asteroïds)
14. Vekonyz - The Way I Do
15. Mihai Toma - Flutaka
16. R.I.O. feat. U-Jean - One In A Million
17. Sarah Jsun feat. Alexander Shiva - My Place
18. Lariss - Dale Papi
19. Sunrise Inc feat. Master Mc - Muevete
20. Nicola Fasano & Miami Rockets - Banned

== Charts ==
Chart	Peak
Chart	Turkey
DnR Top 10	2
