= Otilia =

Otilia is a feminine given name. Notable people with the name include:

- Otilia Bădescu (born 1970), Romanian table tennis player
- Otilia Brumă (born 1992), Romanian singer-songwriter
- Otilia Cazimir (1894–1967), Romanian poet
- Otilia Larrañaga, Mexican dancer and actress
- Otilia Lux, Guatemalan social leader
- Otilia Pasarica (born 1968), Romanian volleyball player
- Otilia Ruicu-Eșanu (born 1978), Romanian track and field athlete

== See also ==
- Ottilie
- Plácido Otilia family, Mexican family which specializes in the making of traditional musical instruments
