= Ottilia =

Ottilia is a feminine name and may refer to:

== People (given name) ==
- Saint Ottilia (c. 662 – c. 720), Roman Catholic saint
- Ottilia Adelborg (1855–1936), Swedish children's book illustrator
- Ottilia Borbáth (born 1946), Romanian actress
- Ottilia Littmarck (1834–1929), Swedish actress and theatre director
- Ottilia Reizman (1914–1986), Russian camerawoman and filmmaker

== Other ==
- 401 Ottilia, a large main-belt asteroid

== See also ==
- Ottilie
