= Otley (disambiguation) =

Otley is a town in West Yorkshire, England.

Otley may also refer to:

- Otley, Iowa, US
- Otley, Suffolk, England
- Otley (film), a 1968 British film
- Otley (UK Parliament constituency), 1885–1918
- Otley Brewing Company Limited, Welsh Brewery
- Kathryn Otley, Canadian Anglican bishop

== See also ==
- Ottley, a surname
- Ottley's, St. Kitts
