= Rosemary Hollis =

British political scientist (1952–2020)

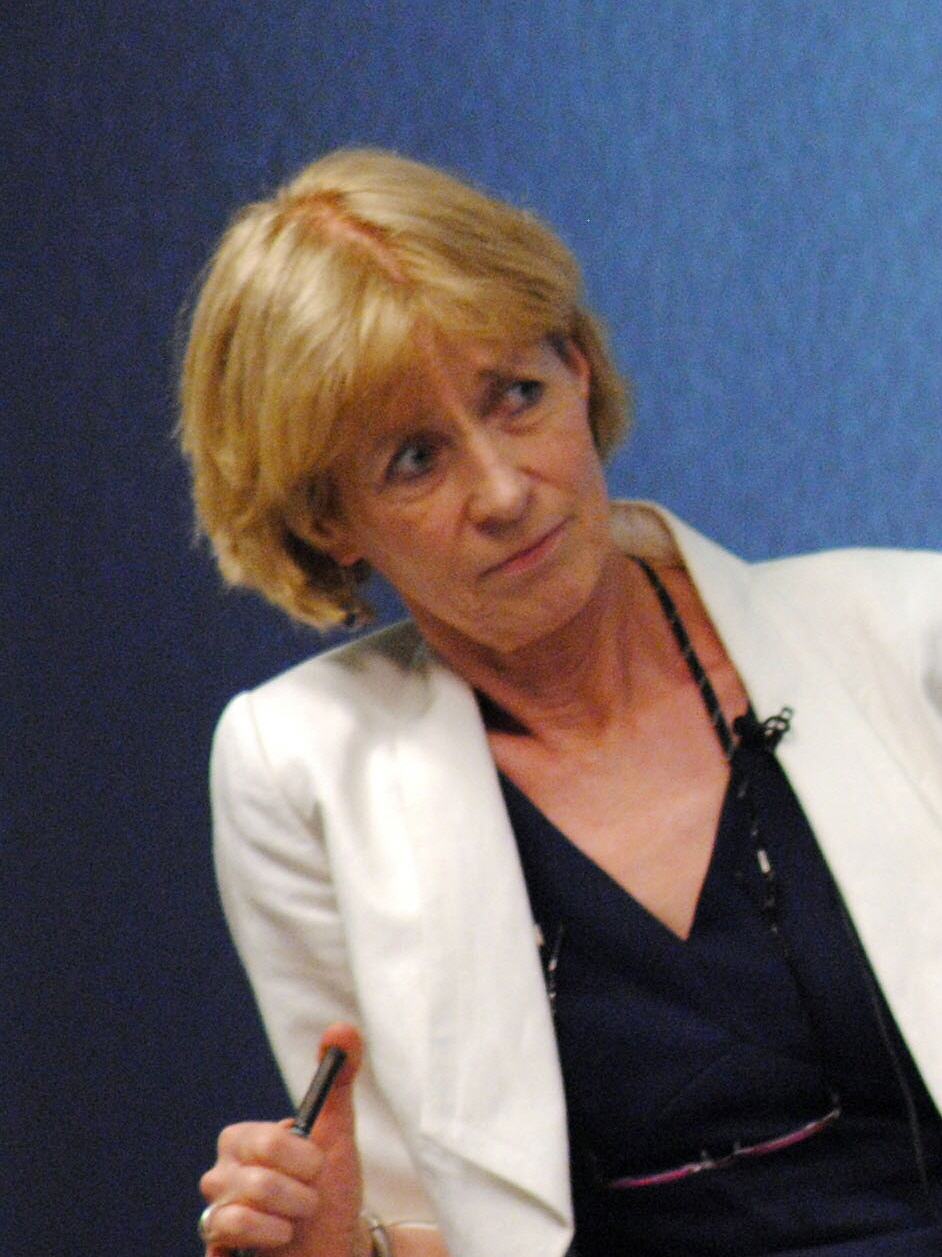
- Hollis in 2013
- Born: 27 March 1952; Dudley, England
- Died: 5 June 2020 (aged 68); London, England
- Occupation: International relations scholar

Academic background
- Education: King's College, London (BA, MA); George Washington University (PhD)

Rosemary "Rosy" Hollis (27 March 1952 – 5 June 2020) was a British scholar of international relations. Professor of Middle East Policy Studies at City University London until her retirement in 2018, Hollis was known for her expertise and scholarship on the relations between the European Union, the United Kingdom and the United States with the Middle East. She was formerly the Research Director at Chatham House (the Royal Institute of International Affairs).

== Biography ==
=== Background ===
Rosemary Hollis was born in Dudley, England, on 27 March 1952. She was educated at the Alice Ottley School, Worcester and graduated from King's College, London, with a BA in History in 1974 and MA in War Studies in 1975. Before moving to the United States in 1980, she held various research positions in the media and commerce in London, having also worked for the advertising agency Saatchi & Saatchi. She gained a PhD in Political Science from George Washington University in Washington, DC, where she was also a lecturer in Political Science and International Affairs (1980–1989).

=== Career ===
In 1990 she returned to the United Kingdom, to become the head of the Middle East programme at the Royal United Services Institute for Defense Studies, a position she held until 1995. She then moved to a similar role at Chatham House, as head of its Middle East programme. In 2005 she became director of research at Chatham House, with overall responsibility for research activity, project formulation, grant applications and the publications of the institute. In 2008 she joined City University, London as the Director of the Olive Tree Programme (2008–2016) and Professor of Middle East Policy Studies (2012–18).

=== Personal life and death ===
Hollis was married to Michael Holland from 1975 until their divorce in 1983, then to Soviet dissident Dmitry Mikhayev from 1983 to 1986. At the time of her death, she lived in Tottenham, London, and died at her residence from a pulmonary embolism on 5 June 2020, at the age of 68.

== The Olive Tree Scholarship Programme ==
In March 2008, Hollis left Chatham House to join City University, London as the new Director of the Olive Tree Scholarship Programme, succeeding Dr. Aimee Shalan. The Olive Tree programme started in 2004 under joint founders Mohamed Bin Issa Al Jaber and Derek Tullett and was originally an independent charitable trust based at City University (The Olive Tree Educational Trust). The Trust was later dissolved and the programme subsumed by the University. Olive Tree awarded scholarships for exceptional Israeli and Palestinian students to study for an undergraduate degree at City. The students participated in a specially designed parallel programme – in conjunction with their academic studies – in order to promote further understanding of the Israeli-Palestinian conflict. The scholarship programme was initiated in 2004, and some of its alumni have assumed key roles in their respective communities. One of these alumni, Stav Shaffir, has become the youngest Israeli Knesset member after leading the 2011 Israeli social justice protests. The Olive Tree Programme was wound up in 2016 due to a lack of funding.

== Selected writings ==
=== Books ===
- Hollis, R., Surviving the Story: The Narrative Trap in Israel and Palestine (London: Red Hawk Books, 2019)
- Hollis, R., Britain and the Middle East in the 9/11 Era (London: Wiley-Blackwell & Chatham House, 2010)
- Hollis, R., Hamarneh M., & Shikaki, K, Jordanian-Palestinian Relations: Where To? (London: RIIA, 1997)

=== Chapters ===
- Hollis, R. ‘Europe in the Middle East’, in Louise Fawcett, ed., The International Relations of the Middle East, 5th edition (Oxford: OUP, 2019 and previous 4 editions)
- Hollis, R. ‘The Role of the European Union’ in Sverre Lodgaard, ed., External Powers and the Arab Spring (Oslo: Scandinavian Academic Press, 2016)
- Hollis, R. ‘Mubarak: the embodiment of “moderate Arab leadership”’ in Lawrence Freedman and Jeffrey Michaels, eds., Scripting Middle East Leaders: The Impact of Leadership Perceptions on US and UK Foreign Policy (London: Bloomsbury Academic Press, 2013).
- Hollis, R., 'European Elites and the Middle East', in Andrew Gamble and David Lane, eds., The European Union and World Politics: Consensus and Division (London: Palgrave Macmillan, 2009) pp. 137–53.
- Hollis, R., 'Europe in the Middle East', in Louise Fawcett, ed., The International Relations of the Middle East, 2nd edition (Oxford: OUP, 2009) pp. 331–348.
- Hollis, R., 'Back to Iraq' in Zach Levy and Eli Podeh, eds., Britain and the Middle East: From Imperial Power to Junior Partner, (Sussex Academic Press, 2007)
- Hollis, R., 'The United Kingdom: Fateful Decision, Divided Nation' in Rick Fawn & Raymond Hinnebusch, eds., The Iraq War: Causes and Consequences, (London and Boulder Colorado: Lynne Reinner, 2006) pp. 37–47.
- Hollis, R., 'The U.S. Role: Helpful or Harmful?' in Lawrence Potter & Gary Sick, eds., Unfinished Business: Iran, Iraq and the Aftermath of War (New York: Palgrave, 2004)
- Hollis, R., 'The end of historical attachments: Britain's changing policy towards the Middle East', in Toby Dodge & Richard Higgott, eds., Globalization and the Middle East: Islam, Economy, Society and Politics (London: RIIA, 2002) pp. 57–80.
- Hollis, R., 'Turkey and the Geopolitical Implications of EU Enlargement', in Christian-Peter Hanelt, Felix Neugart & Matthias Peitz, eds., Future Perspectives for European-Gulf Relations (Guetersloh: Bertelsmann, 2000)
- Hollis, R., 'Western Security Strategy in South West Asia', in Anoushiravan Ehteshami, ed., From the Gulf to Central Asia: Players in the New Great Game (Exeter: University of Exeter Press, 1994)
- Hollis, R., 'Israeli-European Relations in the 1990s', in Efraim Karsh and Gregory Mahler, eds., Israel at the Crossroads (London: British Academic Press, I.B. Tauris, 1994)

=== Edited volumes ===
- Hollis, R. and Heller, M., eds. Israel and the Palestinians: Israeli Policy Options (London: RIIA, 2005).
- Hollis, R., ed., Managing New Developments in the Gulf (London: RIIA, 2000).
- Hollis, R., ed., Oil and Regional Developments in the Gulf (London: RIIA, 1998).
- Hollis, R and Shehadi, N., Lebanon on Hold (London: RIIA in association with Centre for Lebanese Studies, 1996).
- Hollis, R., ed., Turning Point: The Soviets, Their Successors and the Middle East (London: Macmillan 1993).

=== Journal articles ===
- Hollis, R., 'Palestine and the Palestinians in British Political Elite Discourse: From "The Palestine Problem" to "The Two-State Solution,"' International Relations. Vol. 30(1) 2016, 3–28.
- Hollis, R., ‘Policy Research: Some Reflections on Theory and Practice’, Middle East Law and Governance., 7(3. October 2015.
- Hollis, R., 'No friend of Democratization: Europe's role in the genesis of the 'Arab Spring' ', International Affairs, Vol. 88, No. 1, January 2012, pp. 81–94.
- Hollis, R., ‘The UfM and the Middle East ‘peace process’: an unhappy symbiosis’ Mediterranean Politics, 16/1 March 2011.
- Hollis, R., 'The Israeli-Palestinian road block: can Europeans make a difference? International Affairs, Vol.80, No.2, March 2004, pp. 191–201.
- Hollis, R., 'Getting out of the Iraq trap', International Affairs Vol.79, No.1, January 2003, pp. 23–35.
- Hollis, R., 'Europe in the Middle East: Power by Stealth?' International Affairs, Vol.73, No.1, January 1997, pp. 15–29.
- Hollis, R., 'The Politics of Israeli-European Economic Relations', Israel Affairs, No.1, September 1994, pp. 118–134.
- Hollis, R., 'Inter-Arab Politics and the Gulf War: States' Rights Take Precedence over Pan-Arabism', Cambridge Review of International Affairs, Autumn/Winter 1991-2.
- Hollis, R., ‘At Stake in the Iraqi Invasion of Kuwait: Borders, Oil and Money’, RUSI Journal 1990.
- Hollis, R., ‘Tactical Dynamics of the Intifada and Israel’s Response’, RUSI Journal 1989.
