= Puy-de-Dôme's 1st constituency =

Constituency of the National Assembly of France

1st constituency of Puy-de-Dôme
- inline Constituency of the National Assembly of France

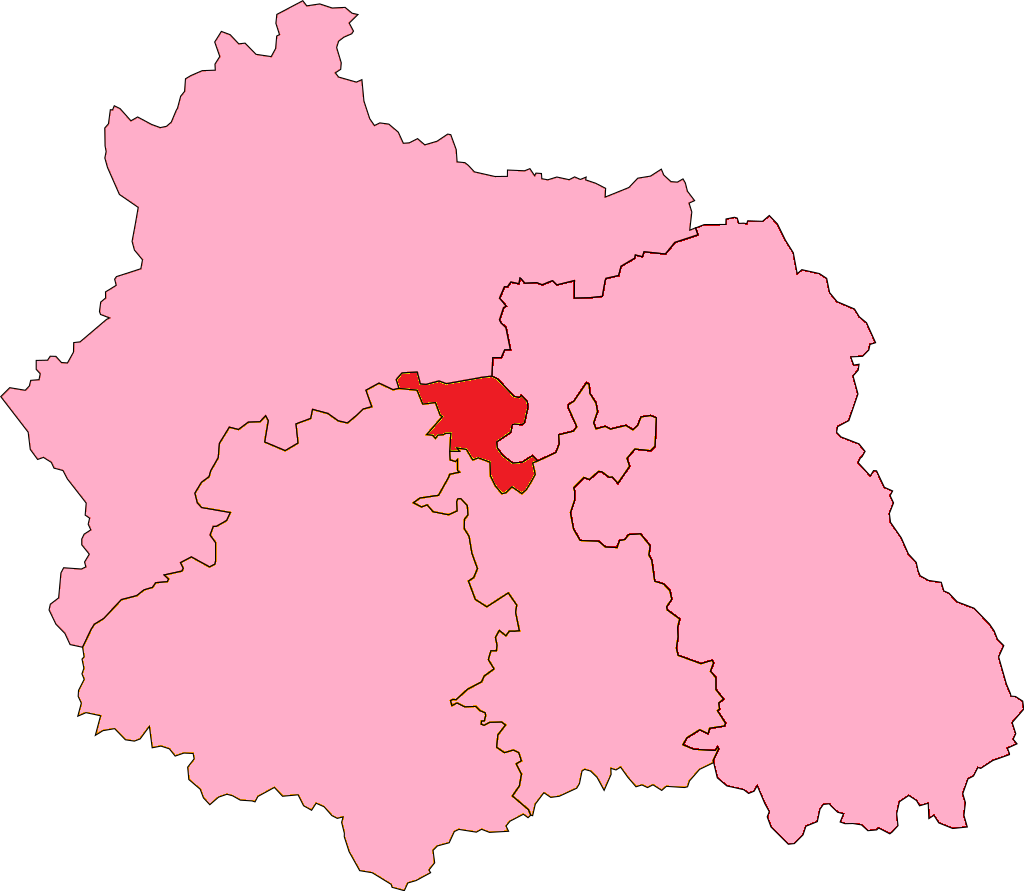
- Puy-de-Dôme's's 1st Constituency shown within Puy-de-Dôme
- Deputy: Marianne Maximi; LFI
- Department: Puy-de-Dôme
- Cantons: Clermont-Ferrand Centre, Clermont-Ferrand Est, Clermont-Ferrand Nord, Clermont-Ferrand Nord-Ouest, Clermont-Ferrand Sud, Cournon-d'Auvergne, Gerzat, Montferrand
- Registered voters: 83501

The 1st constituency of the Puy-de-Dôme (French: Première circonscription du Puy-de-Dôme) is a French legislative constituency in the Puy-de-Dôme département. Like the other 576 French constituencies, it elects one MP using a two-round election system.

== Description ==
The 1st constituency of the Puy-de-Dôme includes most of Clermont-Ferrand in the heart of the department. The city is home to Michelin as well as a host of other major industries.

The constituency has generally opted for left wing deputies with the exception of 1993 and 2017 in recent decades. At the 2017 election the previously dominant Socialist Party trailed in 5th with only 9% of the vote, the left-wing vote being swept up by La France Insoumise who came second. La France Insoumise won the seat at the following election in 2022, as part of the left-wing NUPES alliance.

== Assembly Members ==
Election	Member	Party
1988	Maurice Pourchon	PS
1993	Michel Fanget	UDF
1997	Odile Saugues	PS
2002	Odile Saugues	PS
2007	Odile Saugues	PS
2012	Odile Saugues	PS
2017	Valérie Thomas	LREM
2022	Marianne Maximi	LFI
2024	Marianne Maximi	LFI

== Election results ==
=== 2024 ===
Legislative Election 2024: Puy-de-Dôme's 1st constituency
Party	Candidate	Votes	%	±%
LR	Sébastien Galpier	4,890	8.95	−2.33
LO	Dominique Leclair	733	1.34	n/a
HOR (Ensemble)	Hervé Prononce	13,156	24.08	n/a
LFI (NFP)	Marianne Maximi	20,841	38.14	+3.64
RN	Louis Clément	15,025	27.50	+12.83
Turnout		54,645	97.44	50.89
Registered electors		83,788		
2nd round result
LFI	Marianne Maximi	23,772	43.24	+5.10
RN	Louis Clément	16,311	29.67	+ 2.17
HOR	Hervé Prononce	14,898	27.10	+3.02
Turnout		54,981	97.48	−0.04
Registered electors		83,805		
LFI hold		Swing		

=== 2022 ===
Legislative Election 2022: Puy-de-Dôme's 1st constituency
Party	Candidate	Votes	%	±%
LFI (NUPÉS)	Marianne Maximi	13,211	34.50	+4.82
LREM (Ensemble)	Valérie Thomas	10,466	27.33	-13.23
RN	Anne Biscos	5,617	14.67	+5.38
LR (UDC)	Sébastien Galpier	4,320	11.28	+1.49
PRG	Laurent Hecquet	1,286	3.36	N/A
REC	Xavier Olivier	1,235	3.23	N/A
DVG	Chrif Bouzid	771	2.01	N/A
Others	N/A	1,386	-	−
Turnout		38,292	46.55	−0.05
2nd round result
LFI (NUPÉS)	Marianne Maximi	18,189	52.23	+9.24
LREM (Ensemble)	Valérie Thomas	16,637	47.77	−9.24
Turnout		34,826	44.43	+3.25
LFI gain from LREM		Swing	+9.24	

=== 2017 ===
Results of the 11 June and 18 June 2017 French National Assembly election in Puy-de-Dôme's 1st Constituency
Candidate	Party		1st round		2nd round	
Candidate	Party		Votes	%	Votes	%
Valérie Thomas	La République En Marche!	LREM	15,481	40.56	18,042	57.01
Alain Laffont	La France Insoumise	FI	5,945	15.58	13,603	42.99
Maxime Vergnault	The Republicans	LR	3,738	9.79		
Anne Biscos	National Front	FN	3,546	9.29		
Cécile Audet	Socialist Party	PS	3,544	9.29		
Bertrand Pasciuto	Miscellaneous Left	DVG	2,584	6.77		
Cyril Cineux	Communist Party	PCF	972	2.55		
Damien Folio	Ecologist	ECO	863	2.26		
Antoine Rechagneux	Debout la France	DLF	418	1.10		
Charlène Drigeard	Independent	DIV	287	0.75		
Elena Fourcroy	Independent	DIV	281	0.74		
Dominique Leclair	Far Left	EXG	215	0.56		
Sandrine Clavières	Far Left	EXG	182	0.48		
Frédéric La Carbona	Independent	DIV	72	0.19		
Carole Martel El Mehdaoui	Miscellaneous Right	DVD	41	0.11		
Alexandre Pourchon	Miscellaneous Left	DVG	0	0.00		
Total			38,169	100%	31,645	100%
Registered voters			83,500		83,501	
Blank ballots			522	1.34%	1,865	5.42%
Void ballots			216	0.56%	873	2.54%
Turnout			38,907	46.60%	34,383	41.18%
Abstentions			44,593	53.40%	49,118	58.82%
Result					REM GAIN FROM PS	

=== 2012 ===
Results of the 10 June and 17 June 2012 French National Assembly election in Puy-de-Dôme’s 1st Constituency
Candidate	Party		1st round		2nd round	
Candidate	Party		Votes	%	Votes	%
Odile Saugues	Socialist Party	PS	19,342	44.82	26,583	67.63
Jean-Pierre Brenas	Union for a Popular Movement	UMP	8,918	20.66	12,722	32.37
Jacqueline Simon	National Front	FN	4,416	10.23		
CANDIDATE	Left Front	FG	3,116	7.22		
Alain Laffont	Far Left	EXG	2,373	5.50		
Michel Fanget	Democratic Movement	MoDem	2,087	4.84		
Yves Reverseau	Europe Ecology – The Greens	EELV	1,271	2.94		
Monique Bonnet	Citizen and Republican Movement	MRC	518	1.20		
Joëlle Girard	Ecologist	ECO	361	0.84		
Véronique Sure	Independent Ecological Alliance	AEI	260	0.60		
Saliha Denane	Radical Party	PR	253	0.59		
Marie Savre	Workers' Struggle	LO	243	0.56		
Total			43,158	100%	39,305	100%
Registered voters			80,630		80,629	
Blank/Void ballots			564	1.29%	1,818	4.42%
Turnout			43,722	54.23%	41,123	51.00%
Abstentions			36,908	45.77%	39,506	49.00%
Result					PS hold	

=== 2007 ===
Legislative Election 2007: Puy-de-Dôme's 1st constituency
Party	Candidate	Votes	%	±%
PS	Odile Saugues	13,100	38.81	+2.28
UMP	Anne Courtille	9,976	29.56	+5.87
MoDem	Michel Fanget	3,921	11.62	N/A
LCR	Alain Laffont	1,503	4.45	−0.34
FN	Romain Saint-Luc	961	2.85	−5.02
PCF	Yvette Mercier	907	2.69	−0.69
LV	Yves Leycuras	819	2.43	+0.09
Others	N/A	2,567	-	−
Turnout		34,329	55.74	−7.40
2nd round result
PS	Odile Saugues	20,453	61.25	+6.37
UMP	Anne Courtille	12,939	38.75	−6.37
Turnout		34,418	55.88	−1.29
PS hold				

=== 2002 ===
Legislative Election 2002: Puy-de-Dôme's 1st constituency
Party	Candidate	Votes	%	±%
PS	Odile Saugues	13,261	36.53	+1.63
UMP	Anne Courtille	8,598	23.69	N/A
UDF	Michel Fanget	5,429	14.96	−13.39
FN	Jean-Claude Lalanne de-Haut	2,858	7.87	−3.31
LCR	Alain Laffont	1,740	4.79	+2.07
PCF	Patricria Aucouturier	1,228	3.38	−4.06
LV	Renée Matasse	851	2.34	−2.04
Others	N/A	2,335	-	−
Turnout		37,065	63.14	−1.95
2nd round result
PS	Odile Saugues	17,721	54.88	−3.16
UMP	Anne Courtille	14,567	45.12	N/A
Turnout		33,561	57.17	−12.40
PS hold				

=== 1997 ===
Legislative Election 1997: Puy-de-Dôme's 1st constituency
Party	Candidate	Votes	%	±%
PS	Odile Saugues	12,412	34.90	
UDF	Michel Fanget	10,083	28.35	
FN	Abel Poitrineau	3,976	11.18	
PCF	Danielle Martin	2,648	7.44	
LV	Yves Leycuras	1,557	4.38	
LO	Daniel Séguy	1,104	3.10	
LCR	Alain Laffont	969	2.72	
LDI	Thierry Jocouton	800	2.25	
Others	N/A	2,020		
Turnout		37,464	65.09	
2nd round result
PS	Odile Saugues	21,883	58.04	
UDF	Michel Fanget	15,818	41.96	
Turnout		40,044	69.57	
PS gain from UDF				
