= Samuel Tolansky =

British physicist (1907–1973)

- Born: Samuel Turlausky; 17 November 1906; Newcastle-upon-Tyne, England
- Died: 4 March 1973 (aged 66)
- Education: Durham University; Armstrong College
- Known for: Optics, Interferometry, testing material from Apollo 11
- Awards: C. V. Boys Prize; Fellow of the Royal Society
- Scientific career
- Workplaces: University of Manchester; Royal Holloway College; University of London
- Doctoral advisor: William Lawrence Bragg
- Doctoral students: Daniel Joseph Bradley

Samuel Tolansky, born Turlausky, FRAS FRSA FInstP FRS (17 November 1906 – 4 March 1973), was a British physicist. He was nominated for a Nobel Prize, has a crater on the Moon named after him near the Apollo 14 landing site and he was a principal investigator to the NASA lunar project known as the Apollo program.

== Personal life ==
His parents were Lithuanian-born Jews. He met his wife, the artist Ottilie Pinkasovich (1912–1977), in Berlin where he was conducting research and she attending the Berlin Academy of Art. They married in 1935.

== Education ==
His early education was in Newcastle, first at Snow Street Primary School and then Rutherford College, a Boys' School, 1919–1925.

He then attended Armstrong College, at the time part of Durham University, and later Kings College, Durham. In 1928 he was awarded a Bachelor of Science (BSc) degree with first class honours from Durham University. He also obtained a Diploma in the Theory and Practice of Teaching, 1928–29 with top first class honours. Afterwards he researched at Armstrong College from 1929 to 1931 under Prof. W.E. Curtis FRS.

He then attended the Physikalisch-Technische Reichanstalt in Berlin under Prof. F. Paschen and several spectroscopists where he learnt how to make high-reflectivity films by evaporation. Also in Berlin he met his future wife.

After Berlin he attended Imperial College London with the award of an 1851 Exhibition Senior Studentship from the Royal Commission for the Exhibition of 1851. There, from 1932 to 1934 he researched interferometry under Prof. A. Fowler and began writing "Hyperfine Structure in Line Spectra and Nuclear Spin".

== Career ==
Tolansky-Method for measurement of layer thickness by interferometry

He began work at the University of Manchester, 1934–1947, as an Assistant Lecturer, later Senior Lecturer and Reader, under Prof William Lawrence Bragg. At Manchester he continued work on nuclear spins and did war work involving the optical spectroscopy of uranium-235 measuring its spin. He also developed multiple-beam interferometry, continued teaching and wrote "Introduction to Atomic Physics" in 1942.

From 1947 to 1973 he was Professor of Physics at Royal Holloway College, University of London. In 1960 he supported the admission of male undergraduates to what was founded as a women's only college. They were finally admitted in 1965. Male postgraduates had been admitted from 1945.

He was elected a Fellow of the Royal Astronomical Society, 1947, and of the Royal Society, 1952.

He was awarded the C. V. Boys Prize for contributions to optics by the Physical Society of London in 1948; he was a Silver Medallist, Royal Society of Arts in 1961.

Amongst work he carried out he was particularly interested in the optics of diamond and, partly in this respect, investigated optical characteristics of Moon dust from the Apollo 11 first Moon landing. In 1969 he appeared on the BBC astronomy programme The Sky at Night explaining the dimensions of space, and introduced the concept of 2-dimensional 'Flatlanders'.

=== Publications by Tolansky ===
Noted from the Royal Holloway College archive:

- Editor of Practical handbook on spectral analysis Pergamon Press, Oxford, 1964, ASIN: B001OP6BCG
- An introduction to interferometry (Longmans, Green and Co, London, 1955)
- Curiosities of light rays and light waves (Veneda Publishing, London, 1964)
- Fine structure in line spectra and nuclear spin (London, 1935)
- High resolution spectroscopy (Methuen and Co, London, 1947)
- Introduction to atomic physics (Longmans and Co, London, 1942)
- Multiple-beam interferometry of surfaces and films (Clarendon Press, Oxford, 1948)
- Optical illusions (Pergamon Press, Oxford, 1964);
- Surface microtopography (Longmans, London, 1960); The history and use of diamond (Methuen and Co, London, 1962)
- Editor of The human eye and the sun: hot and cold light (Pergamon Press, Oxford, 1965)
- Interference microscopy for the biologist (Thomas, Springfield Illinois, 1968)
- The strategic diamond (Oliver and Boyd, Edinburgh, 1968)
- Revolution in optics (Penguin Books, Harmondsworth, 1968)
- Microstructures of surfaces using interferometry (Arnold, London, 1968).
- Hyperfine structure in line spectra and nuclear spin (Methuen's monographs on physical subjects, Methuen & Co. LTD. London, 1948)
