= Marianne Maximi =

French politician (born 1985)

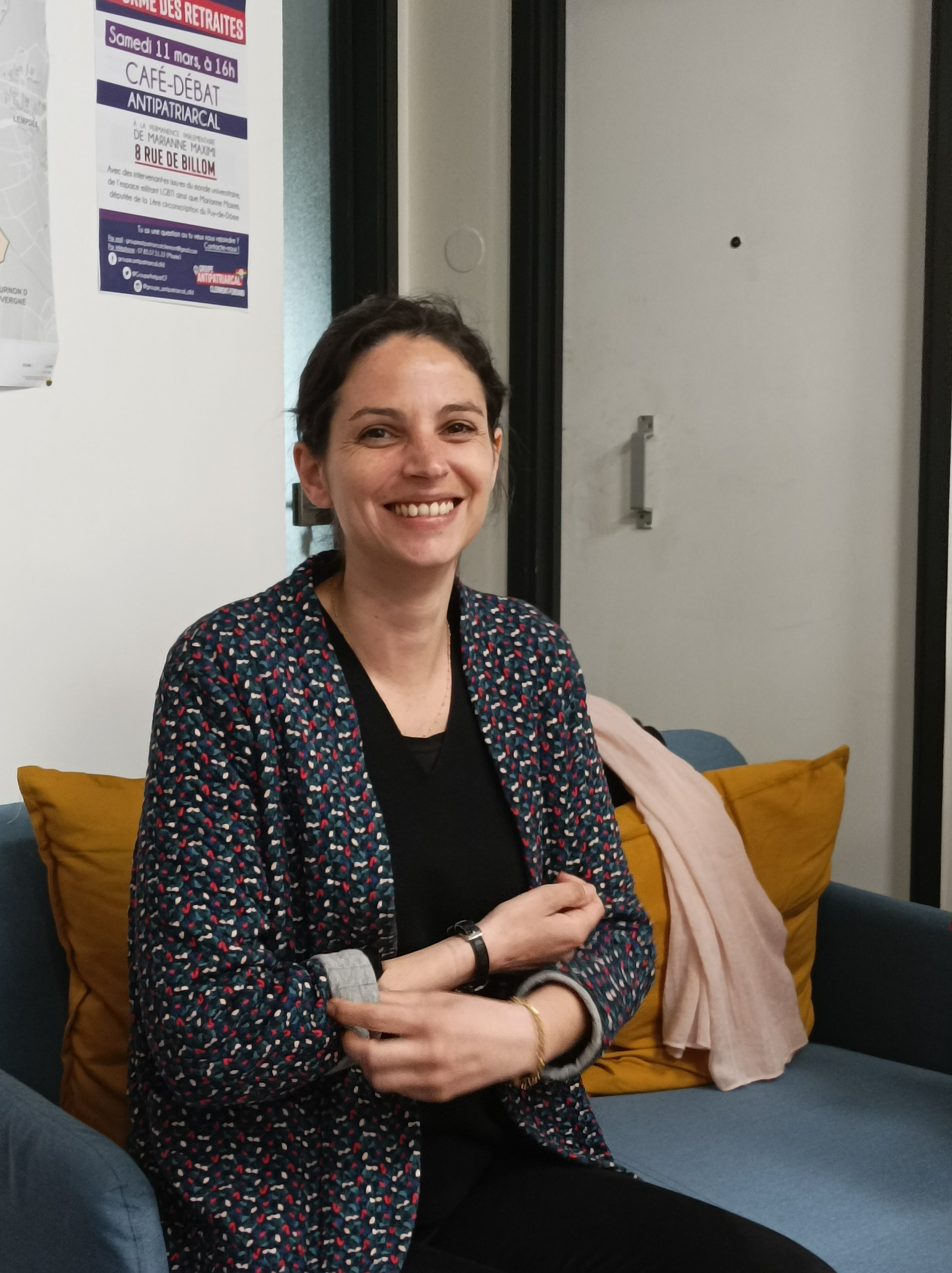

Member of the National Assembly for Puy-de-Dôme's 1st constituency
- Incumbent
- Assumed office 22 June 2022
- Preceded by: Valérie Thomas

Personal details
- Born: 13 November 1985 (age 40) Louviers, France
- Party: La France Insoumise (2016–present)
- Other political affiliations: New Anticapitalist Party (2009–2012); Anticapitalist Left (2012–2013); Ensemble! (2013–2016); Ecosocialist Left (2022–present)
- Occupation: politician

Marianne Maximi (born 13 November 1985) is a French politician of the La France Insoumise (LFI). She was elected as the deputy in the National Assembly for Puy-de-Dôme's 1st constituency in 2022.

== See also ==
- List of deputies of the 16th National Assembly of France
