= Arar Mı =

"Arar Mı?"

Single by Kaan Akalın
- Released: 2016
- Genre: Pop
- Length: 6:55
- Label: DGL&DMC

"Arar Mı?" is a debut single by Kaan Akalın produced in Istanbul; mastered, filmed and photographed in New York City. The single is released under the label DGL&DMC in 2016. As stated by him in his latest interview Habertürk newspaper, has been influenced by Michael Jackson's singing and dancing in this project. The photographs for the single were all shot by Jerry Stolwijk in New York City. Arrangements were completed by Onur Betin. Mastering of the tracks were made in Sterling Sound Studios by Chris Gehgringer who also worked with Rihanna, Justin Bieber, Madonna and Jason Derulo.

== Music video ==
The official music video was released on 6 June 2016. The video sees Akalın singing and dancing in New York City.

== Track listing ==
1. Arar Mı? (3:01)
2. İnanmasam (3:54)

Total length: 6:55
