= Michel Fanget =

French politician (born 1950)

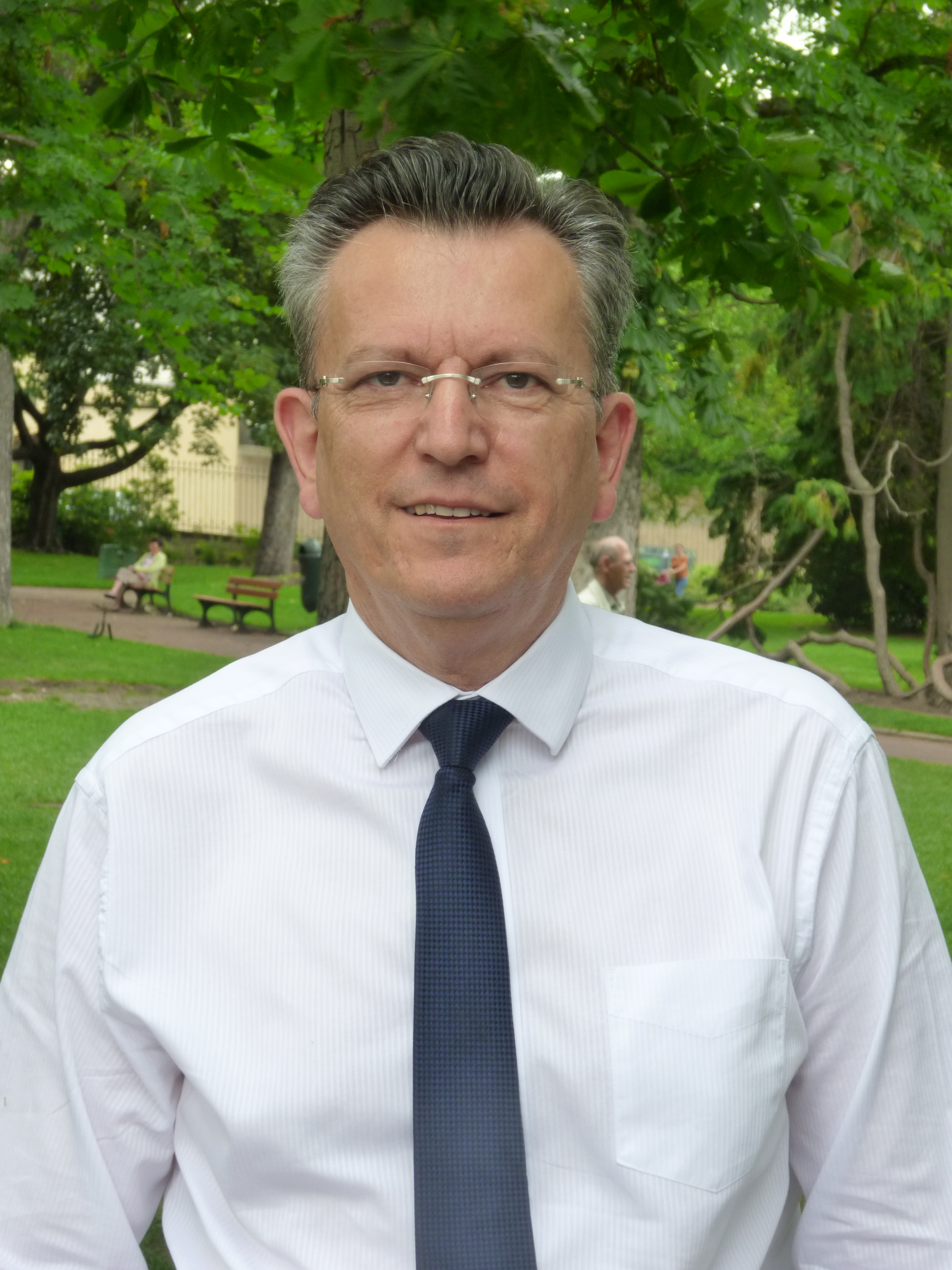
- Parliamentary group: UDF

Deputy for Puy-de-Dôme's 1st constituency in the National Assembly of France
- In office 1993–1997
- Preceded by: Maurice Pourchon (PS)
- Succeeded by: Odile Saugues (PS)

Personal details
- Born: 3 May 1950 (age 75) Clermont-Ferrand

Michel Fanget (born 3 May 1950 in Clermont-Ferrand) is a French politician and a member of the MoDem.

A member of the old Union for French Democracy (UDF), Fanget, an opposition councillor in Clermont-Ferrand was elected deputy for the Puy-de-Dôme's first constituency in the 'blue wave' of the 1993 election. However, he was defeated by the Socialist Odile Saugues in 1997. Fanget also represented the canton of Clermont-Ferrand-Centre from 1994 until he was defeated in 2001.

He joined the MoDem in 2007 and was the party's candidate in Clermont-Ferrand during the 2008 municipal elections.

In 2010, he was selected to be the MoDem's candidate in Auvergne for the 2010 regional elections.

He was MP for Puy-de-Dôme's 4th constituency from 2017 to 2022, being succeeded by Delphine Lingemann.
