= Delphine Lingemann =

French politician (born 1972)

Member of the National Assembly for Puy-de-Dôme's 4th constituency
- Incumbent
- Assumed office 22 June 2022
- Preceded by: Michel Fanget

Personal details
- Born: 14 November 1972 (age 53) Issoire, France
- Party: Democratic Movement

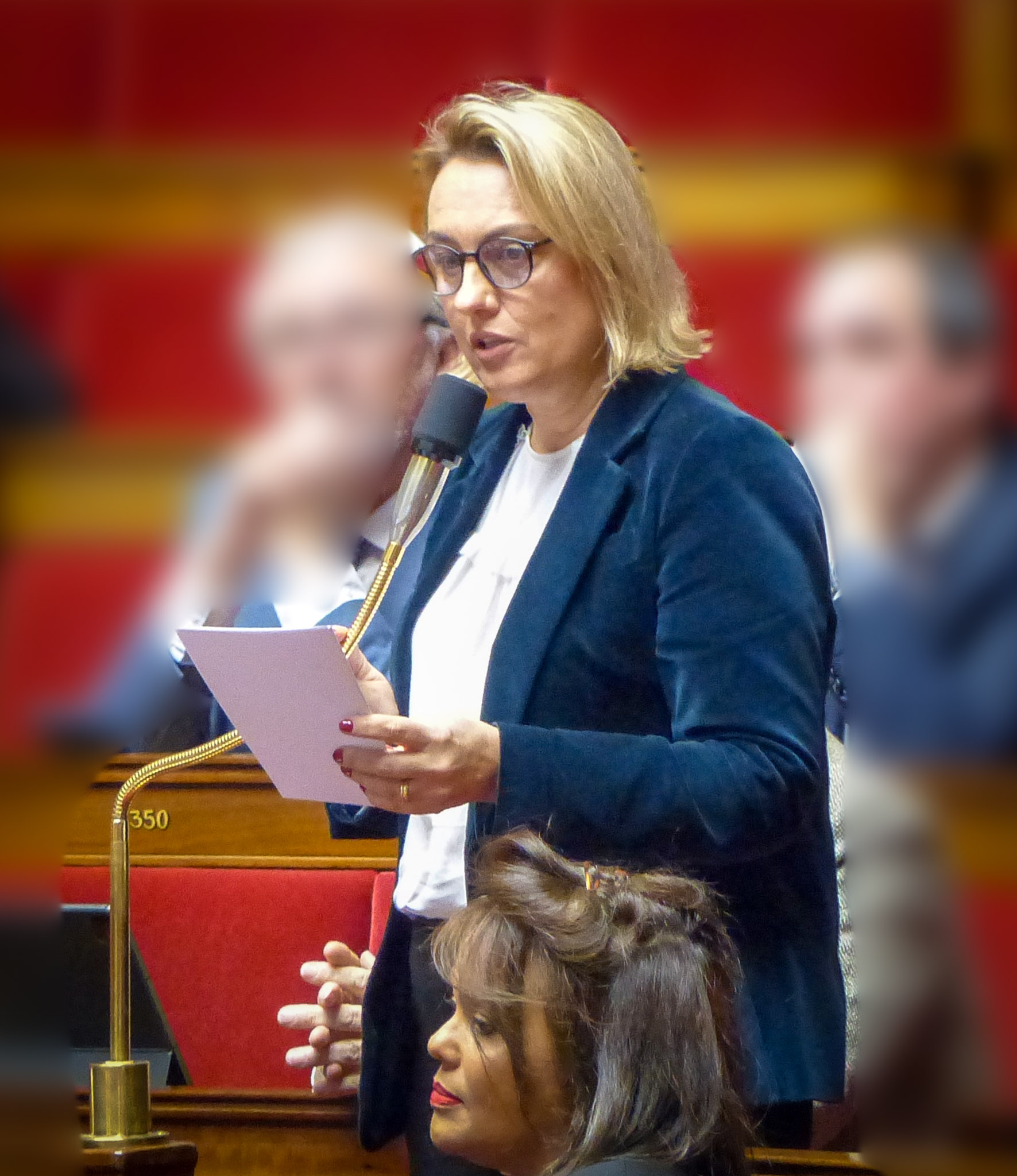
Delphine Lingemann, Member of Parliament for the fourth constituency of Puy-de-Dôme.

Delphine Lingemann (born 14 November 1972) is a French politician from the Democratic Movement who has been representing Puy-de-Dôme's 4th constituency in the National Assembly since 2022.

== See also ==
- List of deputies of the 16th National Assembly of France
