= Odilon =

- Gender: Masculine
- Language: French

Other names
- Related names: Odile

Odilon is a masculine given name of French origin. The name refers to:

- Odilo of Cluny, sometimes referred to as St. Odilon
- Odilon Barrot (1791–1873), French politician
- Odilon Lannelongue (1840–1911), French physician and surgeon
- Odilon Polleunis (1943–2023), Belgian football player, winner of the Belgian Golden Shoe
- Odilon Redon (1840–1916), French painter and printmaker
