= Valérie Thomas =

French politician

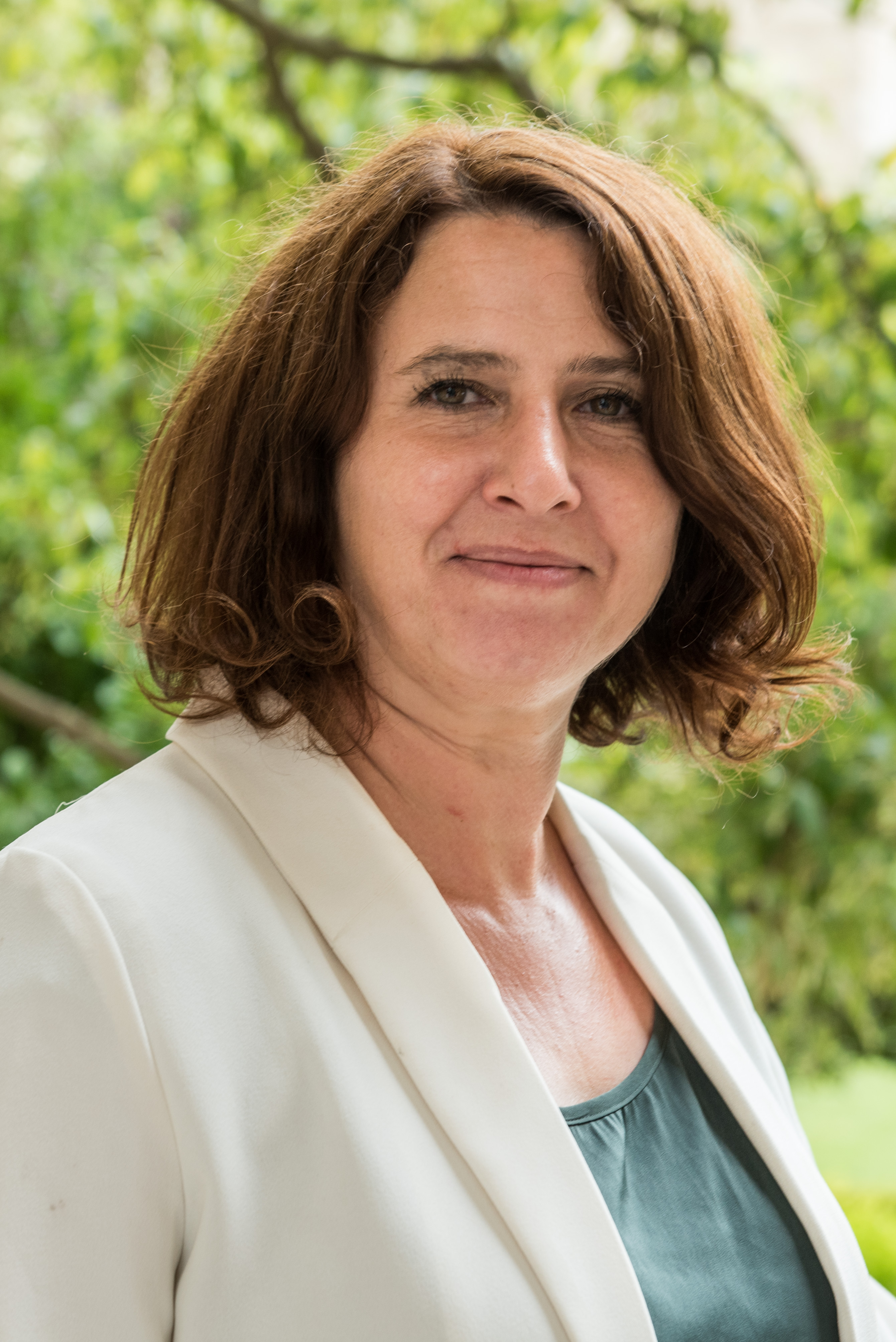

Member of the French National Assembly for Puy-de-Dôme's 1st constituency
- In office 21 June 2017 – 21 June 2022
- Preceded by: Odile Saugues
- Succeeded by: Marianne Maximi

Personal details
- Born: 21 January 1968 (age 58) Désertines, France
- Party: En Marche!
- Education: University of Auvergne
- Occupation: Consultant

Valérie Thomas (born 21 January 1968) is a French politician who was member of the French National Assembly representing Puy-de-Dôme.

== Early life end career ==
Thomas is a consultant in land development projects and president of a business incubator in the field of social and solidarity economy. Between 2006 and 2011, she was in charge of the mission in the Cabinet of the President of the Regional Council of Auvergne.

== Political career ==
Thomas was an administrative and political attaché in the Socialist Party between 2004 and 2006. Previously she worked with Pierre Goldberg, Communist deputy mayor of Montluçon. She is the co-referent of the movement En marche in Puy-de-Dôme.

Thomas was elected to the French National Assembly on 18 June 2017, representing the 1st constituency of Puy-de-Dôme.

In the National Assembly, Thomas sits on the Committee on Foreign Affairs. She is a co-rapporteur on the negotiations on a post-Cotonou Agreement. In addition to her committee assignments, she is a President of France-Eritrea Parliamentary Friendship Group

In July 2019, Thomas voted in favor of the French ratification of the European Union's Comprehensive Economic and Trade Agreement (CETA) with Canada.

== See also ==
- 2017 French legislative election
