= Ottilie Genée =

German actress and soprano

Ottilie Genée, also Ottilie Fritzsch (4 August 1834 − 14 November 1911), was a German stage actress and operatic soprano.

== Life ==
Born in Dreden, the sister of Richard Genée and Rudolph Genée made her debut as a child at the Gdańsk City Theatre, which her father Friedrich Genée had directed since 1841. Later, she also performed in Breslau and at the Hamburg State Opera. In 1850, at the age of 16, she was brought to the newly opened Friedrich-Wilhelm-Städtisches Theater in Berlin. From there she moved to the Kroll Opera House and was able to perform there as a soubrette (trouser roles) and celebrated great successes. Spurred on by this, authors such as Ernst Dohm, Eduard Jacobson, David Kalisch and August Weirauch began to write roles for her. During this time, Genée also repeatedly gave guest performances at various German and Austrian stages.

In 1869, she went on a major tour of the US. There she directed the German Theatre in San Francisco. In 1884, she returned to Germany and could be seen on various German stages over the next few years. At the special request of the German Emperor William I, she appeared in the municipal theatre of Bad Ems and in the Staatstheater Kassel.

After another tour of the US, she settled in Berlin in 1891 and worked there as a teacher of dramatic art. In 1897, the general director of the königliches Schauspielhaus entrusted her with the direction of the drama school attached to it.

At the age of 77, Genée died on 14 November 1911 in Eberswalde and also found her final resting place there.

She was married to the theatre director Charles Fritzsch.

== Student ==
- Elsa Galafrés

== Roles (selection) ==
- Pfefferrösel – Pfeffer-Rosel oder die Frankfurter Messe im Jahre 1297 (Charlotte Birch-Pfeiffer)
- Clothilde – Stadt und Land (Christian Hinrich Spieß)
- Evchen – Der verwunschene Prinz : Schwank in drei Aufzügen (Johann von Plötz 1786–1856)
- Jerold – Die Bummler von Berlin (Eduard Jacobson)
- Näherin – Der Gesindeball (Eduard Jacobson and Jean Kren)
