= The Alice Ottley School =

Coordinates: 52.2006°N 2.2247°W

- Worcester; United Kingdom

Information
- Type: Private girls' secondary
- Motto: Candida Rectaque
- Established: 1883–2007 merger with RGS Worcester
- Founder: Canon William Butler and Alice Ottley
- Grades: 6–13
- Colours: Blue and white
- Affiliations: HMC

The Alice Ottley School was an independent all-girls' school in Worcester that existed under this name – referencing its first headmistress – between 1883 and 2007 before it merged with the Worcester Royal Grammar School.

== History ==
The Alice Ottley School was founded by Canon William Butler of Wantage and Alice Ottley in 1883. Canon Butler had arrived in Worcester in 1881 and he noted that whilst the provision of education for boys was good (with the Royal Grammar School and the King's School), there was nothing of the same calibre for girls. The school opened on 21 June 1883, with eleven girls registered, although owing to sickness, only ten girls began on the day. The school operated on a strong Anglican ethos throughout its 124-year history.

Alice Ottley remained headmistress until 1912. She had already resigned when she fell ill in June 1912. She died in London on 18 September, by coincidence the first day of the new term under her successor, Miss Margaret Spurling. She was buried at Astwood Cemetery, Worcester with the inscription "In Thy Light we shall see Light". In 1957, the City of Worcester added its own, more lasting, commemoration in the form of a window in the cloisters of the cathedral. It remains to this day.

In 2007 the former Alice Ottley School merged with the boys' school and in 2009 it abandoned its name and became part of "RGS Worcester".

== After Alice Ottley ==
Spurling was headmistress from 1912 until 1934. She was succeeded in 1934 by Hilda Roden, who continued as headmistress until 1964. After Roden retired, Eileene Millest became head, retaining the position until 1985. She was the last headmistress to live in a flat in Britannia House itself. Under her, the school expanded from 600 to around 750 girls, still including day-girls and boarders. As a consequence of this expansion, Millest oversaw a number of building projects, including a sports hall (1970–1971), science laboratories (1978), additional classrooms and food technology classrooms.

Millest was succeeded in 1986 by Christine Sibbit, who led the school until her retirement in 1999, when she was succeeded by Morag Chapman, the last headmistress of the school. During Sibbit's time, the school closed its boarding houses and became a day school only.

In its 124-year history, the school had six headmistresses, and a portrait of each hangs in Main Hall. In the last portrait of Mrs Chapman, she wears an enamel brooch which had belonged to Alice Ottley, depicting a white lily – the emblem of the school.

== Links and connections ==
The school had well-established links with Worcester Cathedral, where the annual Carol Service and Prize-giving were held. In Ottley's day, the school was associated with two great British artists: the composer Edward Elgar was a visiting teacher of the violin, whilst Lewis Carroll was a great friend of Ottley’s and regularly visited the school.

== Notable alumnae ==
- Vanessa Redgrave, actress
- Barbara Cartland, writer
- Sheila Scott, the first British pilot to make a solo round-the-world flight
- Nicci Gerrard, writer
- Rachel Trevor-Morgan, bespoke milliner
- Rosemary Hollis, international relations academic
