= Tolly =

Tolly is both a given name and a surname. Notable people with the name include:

== Surname ==
- Michael Andreas Barclay de Tolly (1761–1818), prominent Russian field marshal during the Napoleonic Wars
- Alexander Barclay de Tolly-Weymarn (1824–1905), Russian general, great-nephew of the above
- William Tolly (1715–1784), officer of the British East India Company

== Given name ==
- Tolly Burkan (born 1948), American firewalker
- Tolly Burnett (1923–1993), English cricketer
- Tolly Mashamaite (born 1976), South African politician
- Tolly Mbwette (1956–2020), Tanzanian educator

== See also ==
- Barclay de Tolly (Russian nobility), aristocratic family
- Tolly Lights, a 2008 Indian film
- Tolly Cobbold, a former English brewing company
