= Ottilie Palm Jost =

Canadian artist

- Born: 1878; Hamilton, Ontario, Canada
- Died: 1961 (aged 82–83); Munich, Germany
- Known for: Painting
- Spouse: Josef Jost (m. 1913)

Ottilie Palm Jost (1878–1961) was a Canadian impressionist artist. She was born in Hamilton, Ontario and died in Munich. She helped to found the Hamilton Art Students League in 1898 and worked as a newspaper illustrator. Jost moved to the German Empire in 1911. In 1913 she married the sculptor Josef Jost. Jost painted murals and other impressionist art in Munich until her death in 1961.

== Gallery ==
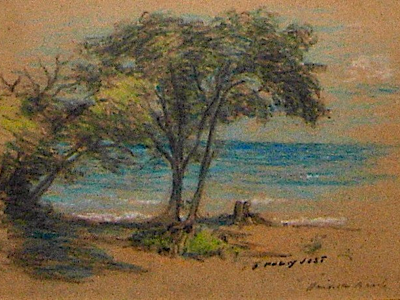
Winona Beach 1910
