= International School of Florence =

School in Florence, Italy

Coordinates: 43.739004°N 11.318346°E

The International School of Florence (ISF) is one of the oldest international schools in Europe. It is located in Florence, Italy, and was formerly known as the American International School of Florence. The ISF is an independent, coeducational, and nonsectarian institution. The school is fully accredited with the Council of International Schools (CIS) and the Middle States Association of Colleges and Schools (MSACS).

The lower school (preschool through grade 5) campus is in Villa le Tavernule, in Bagno a Ripoli while the upper school (grade 6 to 12) campus is in Florence itself, Villa Torri di Gattaia.

== History ==
The International School of Florence was founded in 1952 in Rome as a school for children from many different cultures. In 1963 the school moved to Florence to meet the demand for an English language school in Tuscany. In 1980 it moved to the present site of the Junior School, Villa le Tavernule, about 10km from the center of Florence. In 2003, the Middle and Upper Schools moved to a separate campus, Villa Torri di Gattaia, in central Florence, to allow for the continued growth of the student body.

== The school ==
The International School of Florence is a coeducational, independent school of over 380 international students, from pre-school to grade 12. ISF's Junior School, Villa le Tavernule, is built around a central courtyard which gives access to offices and classrooms, an art studio, computer lab, lunchroom, science lab and the Paul Burke-Mahoney Library. The school grounds comprise Italian gardens, surrounding fields, cypress groves and a variety of play areas with modern recreational equipment and a new all-weather sports field. As of September 2003, the Middle and Upper Schools are housed in a separate campus, Villa Torri di Gattaia, near the Piazzale Michelangelo. The site includes a computer lab (2021 not anymore), an art studio, a library, a cafeteria with covered terrace, three science labs, and access to a sport center called Olympus.
