= Eduard Jacobson =

German playwright and writer (1833–1897)

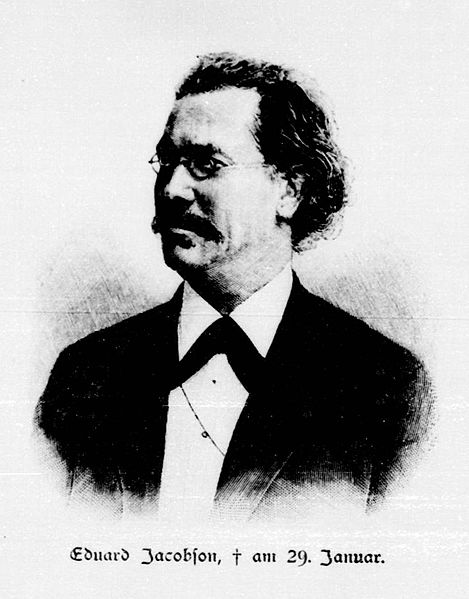
- Born: 10 November 1833; Gross Strelitz, Silesia, Kingdom of Prussia
- Died: 29 January 1897 (aged 63); Berlin, German Empire
- Spouse: Marie Clara Agnes Lange (m. 1863)
- Writing career
- Language: German

Eduard Jacobson (10 November 1833 – 29 January 1897) was a German dramatist and physician.

== Biography ==
Eduard Jacobson was born in Gross Strelitz, Silesia, to Jewish parents Dorothea (née Biraver) and Rabbi Jacob Jacobson. He attended the Gymnasium in Oels from 1846 to 1850, and then until 1854 the grammar school in Ostrowo. From 1854 to 1858 he studied medicine at the University of Berlin, receiving his M.D. there in early 1859.

Jacobson's playwrighting career began in 1856 with the popular farces Bei Wasser und Brot and Faust und Gretchen, the latter of which appeared at the Kroll Theatre under the direction of Karl August Görner, starring Theodor Lobe as Faust. The extraordinary acclaim he won with it determined him to devote himself exclusively to such literary activity. From this time on he wrote—either alone or in collaboration with Ottokar Franz Ebersberg, Otto Girndt, Gustav von Moser, Julius Rosen, Rudolf Kneisel, and others—burlesques which became stock pieces in major German theatres. His farce 500,000 Teufel, for instance, played 300 times successively in Berlin.

In the United States, many of his plays were staged at the New York Stadt Theater and Thalia Theater.

== Selected publications ==
- Jacobson, E.; Lobe, Theodor (1856). Faust und Gretchen. Berlin.
- — (1858). Verwandlungen, oder: Für Jeden Etwas!. Berlin: Eduard Bloch.
- — (1858). Possen und Vaudevilles. Berlin: Eduard Bloch. hdl:2027/uc1.a0000067140.
- — (1858). Meine Tante – deine Tante!. Berlin: Eduard Bloch. Music by Adolf Lang.
- — (1859). Bei Wasser und Brot. Berlin.
- —; Anders, N. J. (1860). Starker Tabak, oder: Berlin und Hinter-Indien. Berlin: Eduard Bloch.
- — (1860). Die Afrikanerinz. Berlin: Eduard Bloch. Music by Thuiskon Hauptner.
- — (1860). Lady Beefsteak. Berlin. Music by Adolf Lang.
- — (1861). Wer zuletzt lacht. Berlin. Music by August Conradi.
- — (1862). 500,000 Teufel. Berlin.
- — (1862). Lehmann's Jugendliebe. Berlin: Eduard Bloch. Music by M. Conradi.
- — (1864). Backfische, oder: ein Mädchen-Pensionat. Berlin. Music by Gustav Michaelis.
- — (1864). Seine bessere Hälfte. Berlin.
- — (1865). Narziß im Frack. Berlin.
- — (1867). Becker's Geschichte. Berlin.
- — (1867). Singvögelchen. Berlin: Eduard Bloch. Music by Thuiskon Hauptner.
- — (1867). Humor verloren - alles verloren!. Berlin.
- — (1869). Kammerkätzchen. Berlin.
- —; Linderer, Robert (1870). Die götter in der halenhaide, oder: Berliner im Olymp. Berlin: Eduard Bloch. hdl:2027/njp.32101069188512.
- — (1870). 1733 Thaler, 22½ Silbergroschen. Berlin.
- — (1872). Triesel und Wiesel. Berlin. Music by Gustav Lehnhardt.
- — (1872). Des Lebens Mai. Berlin. Music by C. and H. Schröder.
- —; Girndt, Otto (1872). Die Galloschen des Glücks. Berlin: R. Boll. Music by O. Lehnhardt.
- —; Görlitz, Carl (1873). Die schöne Sünderin. Berlin. Music by August Conradi.
- —; Rosen, Julius (1873). Im Himmel. Berlin. Music by O. Lehnhardt.
- —; Rosen, Julius (1874). Je toller, je besser!. Berlin. Music by Gustav Michaelis.
- —; Kneisel, Rudolf (1877). Hotel Klingebusch. Berlin. Music by Gustav Michaelis.
- — (1883). Ein gemachter Mann. Berlin. hdl:2027/ucw.ark:/13960/t01z4h21v.
- — (1883). Die Lachtaube. Berlin.
- — (1883). Der jüngste Leutnant. Berlin.
- —; Wilken, Heinrich (1886). Das lachende Berlin. Berlin. Music by H. Grau.
- — (1887). Was den Frauen gefällt. Berlin.
- — (1887). Der Nachbar zur Linken. Berlin.
- —; Karl, Engelbert (1888). Die Salontirolerin. Berlin. Music by Franz Roth.
- —; Girndt, Otto (1888). Ein weißer Rabe. Leipzig: Philipp Reclam. Music by Gustav Michaelis.
- — (1890). Goldfuchs. Berlin.
- —; Hahn, R. (n.d.). Das schöne Geschlecht. Music by Gustav Michaelis.
