= Odile Saugues =

French politician

- Parliamentary group: Socialist

Deputy for Puy-de-Dôme's 1st constituency in the National Assembly of France
- In office 12 June 1997 – 20 June 2017
- Preceded by: Michel Fanget (UDF)
- Succeeded by: Valérie Thomas (LREM)

General Councillor, Puy-de-Dôme for the Canton of Montferrand
- In office 21 March 1982 – 18 March 2001
- Preceded by: Canton Created
- Succeeded by: Nadine Déat (PS)

Personal details
- Born: 26 January 1943 (age 83) Clermont-Ferrand

Odile Saugues (born 26 January 1943) was a member of the National Assembly of France. She represented Puy-de-Dôme's 1st constituency in the Puy-de-Dôme department, from 1997 to 2017 as a member of the Socialiste, radical, citoyen et divers gauche.
