= Robert Lawrence Ottley =

English theologian

Robert Lawrence Ottley (2 September 1856 – 1 February 1933) was an English theologian.

== Life ==
He was the son of Lawrence Ottley, Canon of Ripon. He was born in Richmond, Yorkshire, and was educated by his sister Alice Ottley and at King's School, Canterbury. The rest of his academic career up to 1933 was spent at Oxford. His undergraduate studies took place at Pembroke College, of which he became an Honorary Fellow in 1905. He was tutor at Christ Church in 1881, and Principal of Cuddesdon Theological College from 1886. In 1890 he became Divinity Dean at Magdalen College. Then, in 1893 he became Principal of Pusey House. During 1903, he was appointed Regius Professor of Moral and Pastoral Theology, and also a Canon of Christ Church.

== Works ==
He wrote:

- Christian Ethics contributed to Lux Mundi (1890)
- Lancelot Andrewes (1894)- see also text at Internet Archive
- The Doctrine of the Incarnation (1895)
- Aspects of the Old Testament, the Bampton Lectures (1897)
- The Hebrew Prophets (1898)
- Short History of the Hebrews to the Roman Period (1901)
- The Grace of Life (1903)
- The Religion of Israel (1905)
- Christian ideas and ideals : an outline of Christian ethical theory (1909)
- The Rule of Faith and Hope (1911)
- The Rule of Life and love: an exposition of the Ten Commandments (1913)
- Christian Morals (1914)
- The Rule of Work and Worship: An Exposition of the Lord's Prayer (1915)
- Studies in the Confessions of St. Augustine (1919)
