= Jean-Paul Bacquet =

French politician

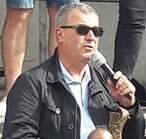
- Jean-Paul Bacquet

Member of the National Assembly of France for 4th Constituency of Puy-de-Dôme
- Incumbent
- Assumed office 1997 French legislative election

Secretary of the National Assembly
- In office 27 June 2007 – 1 October 2008

Mayor of Coudes
- Incumbent
- Assumed office 20 March 1989

Municipal councillor of Coudes
- In office 20 July 1981 – 19 March 1989

Regional councillor of Auvergne
- Incumbent
- Assumed office March 2004

Judge of the High Court of Justice
- In office 13 November 2002 – 19 June 2007

Judge of the Court of Justice of the Republic
- In office 13 November 2002 – 19 June 2007

Personal details
- Born: 11 March 1949 (age 77) Saint-Mandé, Val-de-Marne France
- Party: PS
- Other political affiliations: SRC (National Assembly group)
- Profession: Physician
- Committees: Foreign Affairs Committee

Jean-Paul Bacquet (born 11 March 1949 in Saint-Mandé, Val-de-Marne) is a member of the National Assembly of France and represents the Puy-de-Dôme department. He is a member of the Socialist Party (Parti Socialiste) and works in association with the SRC parliamentary group.

== Biography ==
Supported by his mentor, former deputy Joseph Planeix, and by François Mitterrand, whom he describes as a close friend, Jean-Paul Bacquet ran for deputy for the first time in the fourth district of Puy-de-Dôme in 1993. However, Jean-Paul Bacquet was defeated in the second round by Pierre Pascallon of the Rally for the Republic.

He was elected representative in 1997 in the constituency (with Bernard Veissière, mayor of Ardes, as his deputy) , then re-elected on June 16, 2002, for the 12th legislature (2002-2007) and in 2007 with 61.44% of the vote (against Christophe Serre, UMP). His deputy was Michelle Fauvergue, mayor of Auzat-la-Combelle.

Jean-Paul Bacquet ran for re-election in 2012 (with Sylvie Maisonnet, general councilor and former deputy to Alain Néri, as his deputy) in a redrawn 4th district that includes part of Clermont-Ferrand. Before the election, he announced that, if elected, this would be his last term in the National Assembly in order to make way for younger candidates. Jean-Paul Bacquet was re-elected in the first round with 50.92% of the vote.

Jean-Paul Bacquet's work in the National Assembly focuses mainly on foreign affairs issues, but he is also interested in healthcare issues in rural areas[4]. He is a member of the Foreign Affairs Committee and the French delegation to the Parliamentary Assembly of the Organization for Security and Co-operation in Europe.

Jean-Paul Bacquet served as rapporteur for foreign trade until 2012. On October 9, 2012, he was elected chairman of the board of directors of Ubifrance, the French agency responsible for helping French companies develop their export capabilities. He replaced Alain Cousin, who had held the position since 2007. His appointment was made official on December 19 by a decree of the President of the Republic.

In early 2017, he announced his candidacy for president of the Agglo Pays d'Issoire urban community. He was elected president on January 9, 2017.

He was appointed by decree on March 17, 2017 to the French Economic, Social and Environmental Council as an associate member of the Economy and Finance Section.

He is a member of the Franco-Russian Dialogue association, described as a pro-Kremlin lobbying organization.
