= X Factor (Turkish TV series) =

Turkish television series

- Also known as: Star Işığı
- Presented by: Kadir Doğulu
- Judges: Nigar Jamal; Sinan Akçıl; Atiye; Nihat Odabaşı
- Country of origin: Turkey
- Original language: Turkish
- No. of seasons: 1
- No. of episodes: 12

Production
- Producers: Med Yapım; Alketa Vejsiu
- Production location: Turkey

Original release
- Network: Kanal D
- Release: 10 February – 19 July 2014

Related
- The X Factor

X Factor was a Turkish reality television talent show presented by Gamze Özçelik and produced by Med Yapım and Alketa Vejsiu. During the live shows, the show was cancelled and pulled off the air on 19 July 2014 due to poor ratings.

== Contestants ==
Category (mentor)	Acts		
Boys (Odabaşı)	Ahmet Aslan	Ali Vatandaş	Atakan Yıldırım
Girls (Akçıl)	Melis Hızır	Mehtab Javanmardini	Ferah Zeydan
Over 27s (Jamal)	Canan Ay	Serkan Can	Halil Polat
Groups (Atiye)	4Gen	Ahenk	Kosinüs

== Results summary ==
Contestant	Week 1	Week 2	Remaining weeks
Ahmet Aslan	Safe	Safe	Cancelled
Ali Vatandaş	Safe	Safe	Cancelled
Atakan Yıldırım	Safe	Safe	Cancelled
Melis Hızır	Safe	Safe	Cancelled
Mehtab Javanmardini	Bottom two	10th	Cancelled
Ferah Zeydan	Safe	Safe	Cancelled
Halil Polat	Safe	Safe	Cancelled
4Gen	Safe	Safe	Cancelled
Ahenk	Safe	Safe	Cancelled
Kosinüs	Safe	Safe	Cancelled
Canan Ay	Safe	11th	Eliminated (Week 2)
Serkan Can	Bottom two	Eliminated (Week 1)	
Final showdown	Mehtab Javanmardini, Serkan Can	Mehtab Javanmardini, Canan Ay	Cancelled
Atiye's vote to eliminate	Serkan Can	Canan Ay	Cancelled
Jamal's vote to eliminate	Serkan Can	Mehtab Javanmardini	Cancelled
Akçıl's vote to eliminate	Serkan Can	Canan Ay	Cancelled
Odabaşı's vote to eliminate	Mehtab Javanmardini	Mehtab Javanmardini	Cancelled
Eliminated	Serkan Can; 3 of 4 votes Majority	Canan Ay; 2 of 4 votes Deadlock	Cancelled
