= Charles Ottley =

Royal Navy officer (1858–1932)

Rear-Admiral Sir Charles Ottley KCMG CB MVO
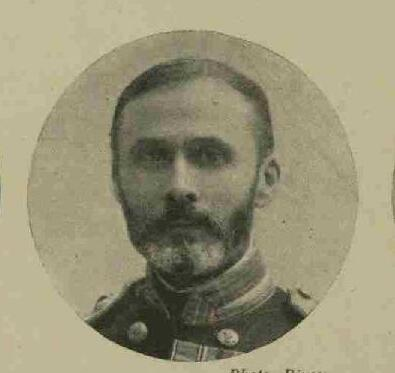
- Born: 8 February 1858
- Died: 24 September 1932 (aged 74)
- Military career
- Allegiance: United Kingdom
- Branch: Royal Navy
- Service years: 1871–1912
- Rank: Rear-Admiral
- Awards: Knight Commander of the Order of St Michael and St George; Companion of the Order of the Bath; Member of the Royal Victorian Order

Rear-Admiral Sir Charles Langdale Ottley KCMG CB MVO (8 February 1858 – 24 September 1932) was a Royal Navy officer who served as Director of Naval Intelligence.

== Life ==
Ottley was born in 1858 to Lawrence and Elizabeth Ottley. His father was a canon in Richmond in Yorkshire. She was educated at home and his eldest sister Alice Ottley cared for him and his three brothers Henry Bickersteth, Edward Bickersteth and Robert Lawrence Ottley. In 1861 he was one of twelve children left when his father died. His family moved back south where his mother and his sister Alice took in pupils.

Ottley joined the Royal Navy in 1871. Promoted to captain in January 1899, he became naval attaché in Paris July 1899 and Director of Naval Intelligence in February 1905 before becoming secretary to the Committee of Imperial Defence in October 1907. Ottley was the main naval delegate to the Second Hague Conference in 1907 and took a leading role in drafting the convention limiting the employment of submarine mines. The next year at the International Maritime Conference he accepted limits on the use of economic blockade, a considerable concession as Britain was at the time the world's greatest naval power.

According to the naval historian Andrew Lambert:

He was a man of much charm and no little literary ability, a good linguist, and a fluent, convincing, and persuasive speaker. Despite his many talents, however, he was not a leader. He made the committee of imperial defence a highly effective secretariat and co-ordinating body, but never achieved the influence or eminence of his successor. He was, like many of his contemporaries, exploited to further the aims of Lord Fisher, and then discarded when he was of no further use.

== Notes ==
Military offices
Preceded by Prince Louis of Battenberg	Director of Naval Intelligence; 1905–1907	Succeeded by Sir Edmond Slade
Government offices
Preceded by Sir George Clarke	Secretary to the Committee of Imperial Defence; 1907–1912	Succeeded by Maurice Hankey
