= Odelia Ntiamoah Boampong =

Ghanaian entrepreneur and news reporter

- nee Ofori
- Born: 1981 (age 44–45); Team, Ghana
- Citizenship: Ghana
- Education: University of Cape Coast; University of Ghana
- Occupations: entrepreneur, TV and radio news reporter
- Organization(s): Board member of the institutional review board for the scientific and industrial research ( C SIR Ghana)
- Notable work: Covered Togolese elections in 2015 Hosted mission Ghana
- Spouse: Prince Sika Ntiamoah Boampong
- Father: Benjamin Kwabena Ofori
- Awards: Ghana journalist award winner Won ministers award in environmental reporting.

Odelia Ntiamoah Boampong (née Ofori; born 1981) is a Ghanaian entrepreneur, TV and radio news reporter. She covered the Togolese elections in 2015 and has covered all UNFCCC conferences since 2009. She is a documentary film maker (World Bank, IFDC, Ministry of Education, Ministry of Environment, Ministry of Energy) and television news presenter, correspondent, anchor, and reporter.

Twice a Ghana Journalist Award winner, she won the minister's award in environmental reporting. She trained at the DW Akademie and was nominated by the US embassy in Ghana for the IVLP programme training in investigative journalism.

She is a board member of the institutional review board for the Center for Scientific and Industrial Research (CSIR Ghana). Passionate about people breaking out of poverty and empowering women economically, she has created the ONfoundation for this purpose.

== Personal life ==
She is a Christian (Ordained Pastor of Victory Bible Church International) and has one child with her husband, Prince Sika Ntiamoah Boampong.

== Early life ==
Odelia was born in Tema, Ghana, to Benjamin Kwabena Ofori, a teacher, who raised her as a single parent.

== Education ==
She holds a master's degree in Oil and Gas Communication from the University of Cape Coast and a Bachelor of Arts degree in geography from the University of Ghana.

== Career ==
Odelia had a seven-year working experience in radio, part as a student Journalists with Radio Universe at the University of Ghana and Citi FM, an Accra-based radio station. She worked with Tv3 Network, a leading private TV station in Ghana, also for seven years.

At Tv3, she hosted Mission Ghana, a social news programme that focused on lapses in the health and educational sector in Ghana. Euronews (Africa News) Correspondent for Ghana, Odelia is into television content provision, host of Health Plus One, a private health programme, Social Connect a social project by entrepreneurs who want to give back to society by training young girls and Business Trends Africa.

== Achievement ==
- She has been honoured by the Young Global Leaders Network as one of the 40 Most Inspirational Female Leaders in Ghana 2024, receiving recognition in the prestigious Women Corporate Personalities of the Year 2024 category.
- Young Global Leaders Network honors her as one of the 40 Most Inspirational Female Leaders in Ghana 2024, receiving recognition in the prestigious Women Corporate Personalities of the Year 2024 category
