= Alice Ottley =

- painting
- Born: 23 March 1840; Acton, Suffolk
- Died: 18 September 1912 (aged 72); London, England
- Successor: Margaret Spurling

Alice Ottley (23 March 1840 – 18 September 1912) was an English educator and the first head of what came to be called The Alice Ottley School in Worcester.

== Life ==
Ottley was born in 1840 at Acton, Suffolk, where her father was the vicar. Her parents were Rev. Lawrence Ottley and Elizabeth Bickersteth Ottley. Her mother came from the prominent Bickersteth family, the eldest daughter of John Bickersteth, sometime Rector of Sapcote. Alice's uncles included Edward Bickersteth, the Dean of Lichfield, and Robert Bickersteth, Bishop of Ripon.

When she was about ten, her family moved to Yorkshire as her father became the rector at Richmond. Her father became the canon the following year and he and Elizabeth continued to have children. In 1854, she was amongst three of the daughters who were sent to a small school in London, but Alice was unhappy and she returned to Richmond. She cared for her younger brothers Henry Bickersteth Ottley, Edward Bickersteth Ottley, Robert Lawrence Ottley and Charles Ottley. In 1861 she was one of twelve children left when her father died. Her family moved back south where she and her mother took in pupils.

The Alice Ottley School was founded by Canon William Butler of Wantage and Ottley in 1883. Canon Butler had arrived in Worcester in 1881 and he founded a new school for girls. Ottley was recommended to Butler as the ideal candidate. The school opened on the 21 June 1883 with ten pupils. They were soon eleven and these became known as the "first brood".

Ottley remained headmistress until 1912 when, having interviewed her successor, she retired. Ottley died in London on 18 September 1912. In 1914 the school's name was changed in her honour. In 1957, the City of Worcester added its own, more lasting commemoration, in the form of a window in the cloisters of the cathedral.

In 2007, the former Alice Ottley School merged with the boys' school and in 2009 it abandoned its name and became part of "RGS Worcester".
