= Ottilie Tolansky =

Austrian artist (1912–1977)

- Self-portrait
- Born: Ottilie Pincasovitch; 1912; Czernowitz, Austria-Hungary
- Died: 1977 (aged 64–65)
- Education: Reimann School; Berlin Academy of Fine Arts; Manchester Municipal School; Hammersmith Art School
- Known for: Painting
- Spouse: Samuel Tolansky (m.1935-1973, his death)

Ottilie Tolansky née Pincasovitch (1912–1977) was an Austrian artist noted for her paintings of nude figures, flowers and for her still life pieces. Tolansky spent the majority of her career in England.

== Biography ==
Tolansky was born in Czernowitz, then part of Austria-Hungary now in Ukraine, but grew up in Vienna and always considered herself Austrian. Her father, Salomo, was the Obercantor at the Alte Synagoge in Berlin and an internationally recognised singer. She studied art in Berlin at the Reimann School and at the Berlin Academy of Fine Arts before moving to England in 1933. There she studied at the Manchester Municipal School and later, after World War II, at the Hammersmith Art School in London. Tolansky, painting mostly in oils, depicted nude figures, flowers and still life compositions and, throughout her career, had several solo shows at London galleries. She was also a regular exhibitor at the Royal Academy and with both the Women's International Art Club and the New English Art Club. Tolansky was an elected member of the Royal Institute of Oil Painters. Her work was featured in both Studio International and the ArtReview magazines.

Tolansky married the physicist Samuel Tolansky in 1935, they settled at Richmond in Surrey and had two children. Major retrospectives of her work were held at the Mall Galleries in 1979 and at the Hurlingham Gallery in London during 1989. The Potteries Museum & Art Gallery holds examples of her paintings.
