= Odelia Fitoussi =

Israeli human rights activist (born 1977)

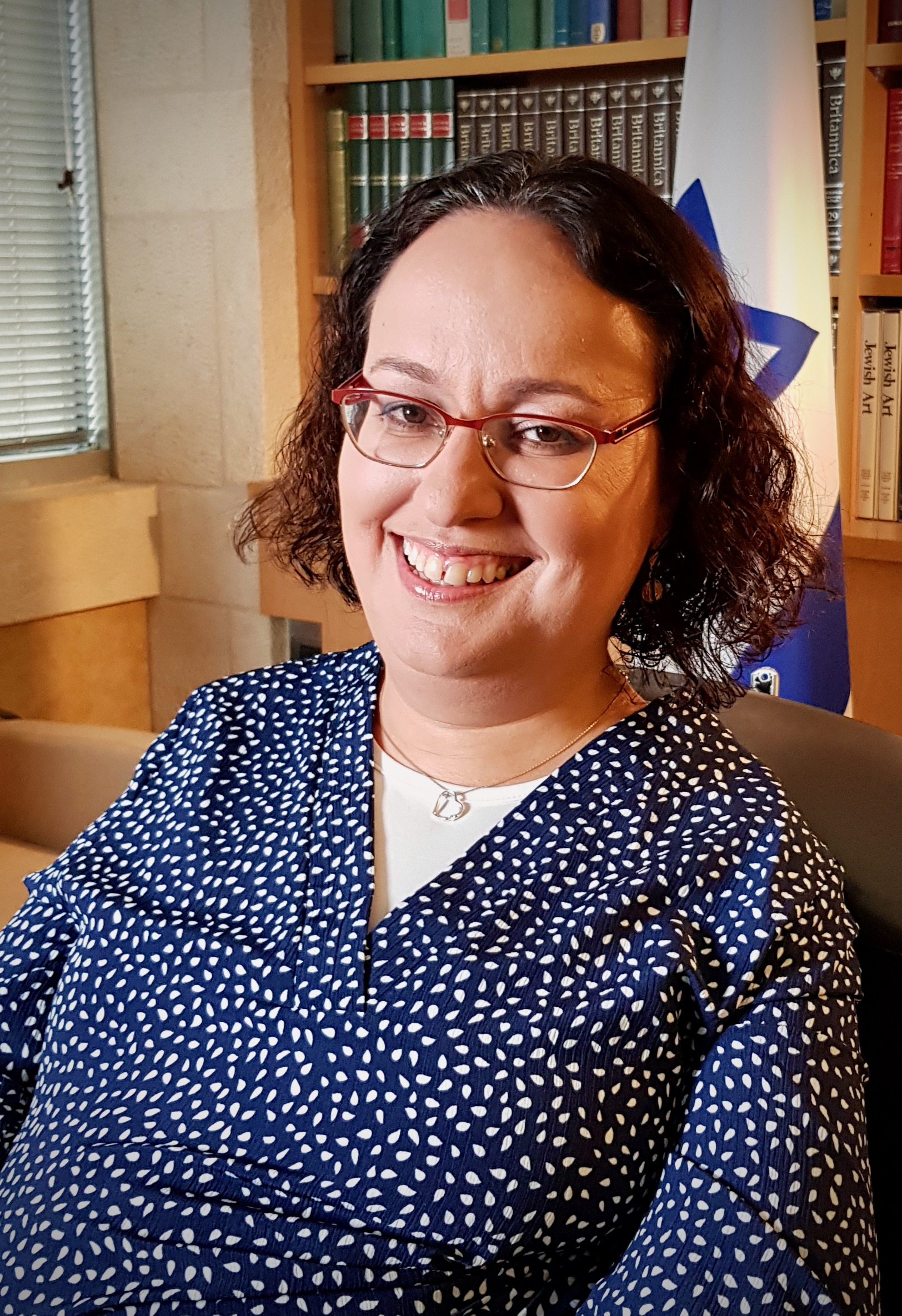
Odelia Fitoussi

Odelia Fitoussi (Hebrew: אודלי-ה פיטוסי; born 1977) is an art therapist (M.A.) and advocate of persons with disabilities (PWDs). She is the first person to be elected to serve on behalf of Israel in the UN Committee of Experts on Disability (CRPD). She currently serves as Chairperson of the Advisory Committee to the Commission for Equal Rights of Persons with Disabilities at the Israeli Ministry of Justice (2013-) and is co-director of the Civil Forum for Promoting the Convention on the Rights of Persons with Disabilities (CRPD).

Fitoussi was born in Israel in May 1977. She obtained her M.A. in Art Therapy from Lesley University in 2009, a B.A. in criminology, Sociology, and Anthropology from Bar-Ilan University in 1998, and is a graduate of the Machon Shaharit "120 Program for Multicultural Political Leadership" (2015).

She is a lecturer, facilitator, and art workshops coordinator on PWDs issues, such as self-advocacy, access to services, human diversity, dealing with crises, making choices, and more. She is the first Israeli Candidate to run for a seat on the UN Committee of Experts for People with Disabilities.

She was born with SMA type2- Spinal Muscular Atrophy, which affects the motor nerve cells in the spinal cord, and as a result, uses a motorized wheelchair.

== Career ==
Fitoussi is CEO of "Hadas," an NGO on the field of sexuality and relations among PWDs, and the Founder and Manager of "Ometz," a company that promotes the inclusion of PWDs and provides workshops, lectures, and group therapy treatments.

She is also a group facilitator and consultant at the Merchavim Institute and the Israeli Ministry of Education's joint program for diversity among school teachers, focusing on teachers with disabilities. There, she works to assist young citizens of different backgrounds, promote tolerance and diversity, and develop a shared civic consciousness by making their classrooms, schools, and communities more inclusive.

Prior to that, she worked as an Art Therapist for two NGOs, "Beit Ekstein" which provides person-centric services for PWDs; and "Talpiot" which supports children and families in times of crisis. In addition, she has served as a group facilitator for the American Jewish Joint Distribution Committee (JDC), providing PWDs with skills to prevent and cope with exploitation, violence, or abuse.

She has published several works in the field of the rights of persons with disabilities including her M.A. thesis, "Shall we have a seat? The therapeutic relations between a therapist with a visible disability and his patients, from their perspective" (2009) and "The Holes in the Strainer" column for the Israeli newspaper "Yedioth Ahronoth" (2015).

== Activism ==
Fitoussi is a former board member, current group coordinator, and active volunteer for the NGO "Beit Hagalgalim" (House of Wheels) which serves to promote rights and services for persons with disabilities. She is also currently acting as a Facilitator and Consultant for Merchavim Institute, working with the Israeli Ministry of Education to promote diversity and inclusion of teachers with disabilities.

She is a board member and active volunteer of the NGO "Bizchut" ('Thanks'), the Israeli Human Rights Center for Persons with Disabilities, where she serves as the organization's representative before government and private bodies.
