= Otilia Pasarica =

Romanian volleyball player (born 1968)

Personal information
- Nationality: Romanian
- Born: 1 March 1968 (age 58)
- Height: 1.81 m (5 ft 11 in)

Volleyball information
- Number: 3 (national team)

Career
| Years | Teams |
|---|---|
| 1994-? | Dinamo Bucarest |

National team
| 1994 | Romania |

Otilia Pasarica (born 1 March 1968) is a retired Romanian female volleyball player. She was part of the Romania women's national volleyball team.

She participated at the 1994 FIVB Volleyball Women's World Championship in Brazil. On club level she played for Dinamo Bucarest.

== Clubs ==
- Dinamo Bucarest
