= Otilia Lux =

Guatemalan politician

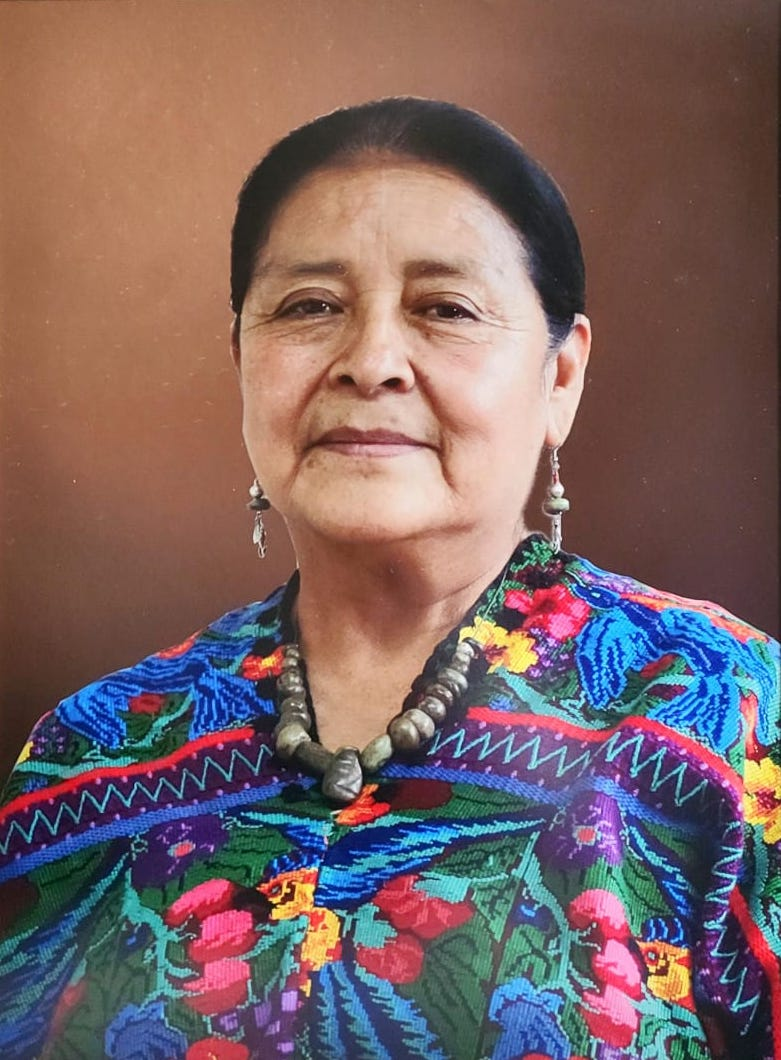
- Official portrait

Minister of Culture and Sports
- In office 14 January 2000 – 14 January 2004
- President: Alfonso Portillo

Personal details
- Born: 21 January 1949 (age 77) Santa Cruz del Quiché, Guatemala
- Party: Encuentro por Guatemala
- Education: Rafael Landívar University
- Occupation: Politician; activist

Otilia Lux de Cotí is a Guatemalan social leader and politician.

== Early life ==
Otilia Lux de Cotí was born in Santa Cruz del Quiché, Guatemala on 21 January 1949.

== Career ==
Lux was a member of Guatemala's Historical Clarification Commission, charged with investigating the human rights violations committed during the Central American nation's 30-year-long civil war. She was the only woman on the commission.

Lux was later chosen to serve as Minister of Culture and Sport in the cabinet of President Alfonso Portillo. She was a member of the United Nations Permanent Forum on Indigenous Issues at the United Nations, and she served on UNESCO's Executive Board for the 2004–2007 period.

In the 9 September 2007 general election, she was elected to Congress as a national list deputy for the Encuentro por Guatemala party.
