= Ottilia Borbáth =

Hungarian actress

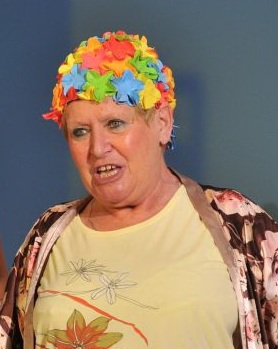
- Born: November 26, 1946 (age 79); Târgu Mureș, Kingdom of Romania
- Occupation: actor
- Father: Andor Borbáth

Ottilia Borbáth (born November 26, 1946, in Târgu Mureș, Romania) is an actress who has appeared in many films as well as appearing in TV mini serials such as the Nightmare Years and The Phantom of the Opera.

== Biography ==
She was born in 1946 in Târgu Mureș, in the family of the Hungarian doctor Andor Borbáth (1912-2000) and his wife, Anna Balázs. She studied at the "Szentgyörgyi István" Theatre Institute in Târgu Mureș (1964-1968). She has been working as an independent actress since 1995. She has been a member of Spirit Színház since 2019.

According to the Romanian cancan press, Ottília Borbáth had a love affair with Florin Piersic, before the actor met Anna Széles.
