= Odilia of Cologne =

Roman Catholic saint

Saint Odilia of Cologne
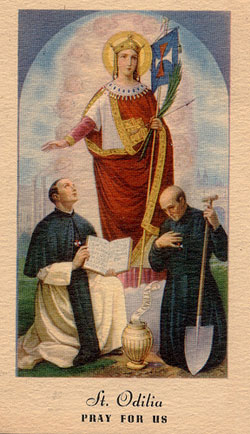
- Santa Odilia

Virgin and Martyr
- Born: 400; Cologne, Germany
- Died: 451; Cologne, Germany
- Honored in: Catholic Church
- Feast: 18 july
- Patronage: Canons Regular of the Order of the Holy Cross

Saint Odilia (or Odile or Ottilia) is a Saint venerated in the Roman Catholic Church, although according to the current liturgical calendar, her feast day (18 July) is not officially commemorated. She is a patroness of the Order of the Holy Cross.

== Legend ==
Legend has few details about her. She is said to have lived in the 4th century and to have been the daughter of a ruler ("king") in Britain. Together with a group of other young women ("virgins") that included St Ursula, she was travelling in Germany, according to one account because they were on a pilgrimage to Rome, another claims that they were looking for a place to settle and quietly practise their faith. However, "barbarians" (huns according to the legend about St Ursula) intercepted them at the gates of Cologne and martyred them.

In 1287 Odilia appeared to a brother of the Crosier Order in Paris; and in response to her request her relics were traced in Cologne and moved to their motherhouse at Huy in Belgium. Along the way to Huy various cures of infirmities happened.

Some of her relics are now in her shrine in Onamia, Minnesota. Others are spread worldwide.
