= Results of the 2024 French legislative election in Vendée =

Following the first round of the 2024 French legislative election on 30 June 2024, runoff elections in each constituency where no candidate received a vote share greater than 50 percent were scheduled for 7 July. Candidates permitted to stand in the runoff elections needed to either come in first or second place in the first round or achieve more than 12.5 percent of the votes of the entire electorate (as opposed to 12.5 percent of the vote share due to low turnout).

== Vendée ==
=== 1st constituency ===
Candidate	Party or alliance		First round		Second round	
Candidate	Party or alliance		Votes	%	Votes	%
Simon-Pierre Paulin	Union of the far right	The Republicans	26,105	32.17	31,121	39.10
Philippe Latombe	Ensemble	Democratic Movement	23,136	28.51	48,477	60.90
Lucie Etonno	New Popular Front	The Ecologists	18,929	23.32		
Laurent Caillaud	Miscellaneous centre	The Centrists	10,607	13.07		
Jean-Marc Barial	Sovereigntist right	Debout la France	1,436	1.77		
Gilles Robin	Far-left	Lutte Ouvrière	942	1.16		
Total			81,155	100.00	79,598	100.00
Valid votes			81,155	96.64	79,598	94.47
Invalid votes			943	1.12	1,397	1.66
Blank votes			1,879	2.24	3,261	3.87
Total votes			83,977	100.00	84,256	100.00
Registered voters/turnout			120,711	69.57	120,759	69.77

=== 2nd constituency ===
Candidate	Party or alliance		First round		Second round	
Candidate	Party or alliance		Votes	%	Votes	%
Béatrice Bellamy	Ensemble	Horizons	30,262	38.74	46,240	60.37
Marie-Christine Ebran	National Rally		28,538	36.53	30,357	39.63
Nicolas Helary	New Popular Front	La France Insoumise	18,234	23.34		
Sophie Barillot	Far-left	Lutte Ouvrière	1,081	1.38		
Total			78,115	100.00	76,597	100.00
Valid votes			78,115	96.90	76,597	95.23
Invalid votes			792	0.98	1,069	1.33
Blank votes			1,703	2.11	2,768	3.44
Total votes			80,610	100.00	80,434	100.00
Registered voters/turnout			114,084	70.66	114,097	70.50

=== 3rd constituency ===
Candidate	Party or alliance		First round		Second round	
Candidate	Party or alliance		Votes	%	Votes	%
Pascal Dubin	Union of the far right	The Republicans	33,545	35.59	40,530	43.57
Stéphane Buchou	Ensemble	Renaissance	32,889	34.89	52,496	56.43
Pascale Marchand	New Popular Front	La France Insoumise	15,466	16.41		
Noël Faucher	Miscellaneous right	The Republicans	8,221	8.72		
Eric Mauvoisin-Delavaud	Far-right	Independent	1,895	2.01		
Armelle Guénolé	Sovereigntist right	Debout la France	1,428	1.51		
Philippe Festien	Far-left	Lutte Ouvrière	817	0.87		
Total			94,261	100.00	93,026	100.00
Valid votes			94,261	97.08	93,026	94.99
Invalid votes			954	0.98	1,501	1.53
Blank votes			1,883	1.94	3,402	3.47
Total votes			97,098	100.00	97,929	100.00
Registered voters/turnout			136,893	70.93	136,887	71.54

=== 4th constituency ===
Candidate	Party or alliance		First round		Second round	
Candidate	Party or alliance		Votes	%	Votes	%
Véronique Besse	Miscellaneous right	Independent	28,086	39.31	31,068	43.36
Jacques Proux	National Rally		16,345	22.88	17,613	24.58
Ilias Nagnonhou	Ensemble	Renaissance	13,192	18.46	10,796	15.07
Julie Mariel-Godard	New Popular Front	Communist Party	13,164	18.42	12,170	16.99
Claude Bour	Far-left	Lutte Ouvrière	666	0.93		
Total			71,453	100.00	71,647	100.00
Valid votes			71,453	97.31	71,647	97.97
Invalid votes			533	0.73	375	0.51
Blank votes			1,442	1.96	1,108	1.52
Total votes			73,428	100.00	73,130	100.00
Registered voters/turnout			104,717	70.12	104,729	69.83

=== 5th constituency ===
Candidate	Party or alliance		First round		Second round	
Candidate	Party or alliance		Votes	%	Votes	%
Stéphane Buffetaut	National Rally		21,309	37.87	23,721	42.51
Pierre Henriet	Ensemble	Horizons	19,606	34.84	32,085	57.49
Pierre-Hugues Fourage	New Popular Front	Miscellaneous left	11,321	20.12		
Marius Galand	The Republicans		2,633	4.68		
Sonia Le Theix	Sovereigntist right	Debout la France	742	1.32		
Béatrice Ruault	Far-left	Lutte Ouvrière	659	1.17		
Total			56,270	100.00	55,806	100.00
Valid votes			56,270	97.05	55,806	95.44
Invalid votes			639	1.10	760	1.30
Blank votes			1,073	1.85	1,906	3.26
Total votes			57,982	100.00	58,472	100.00
Registered voters/turnout			84,008	69.02	83,993	69.62
