= Rives-d'Autise =

- Commune
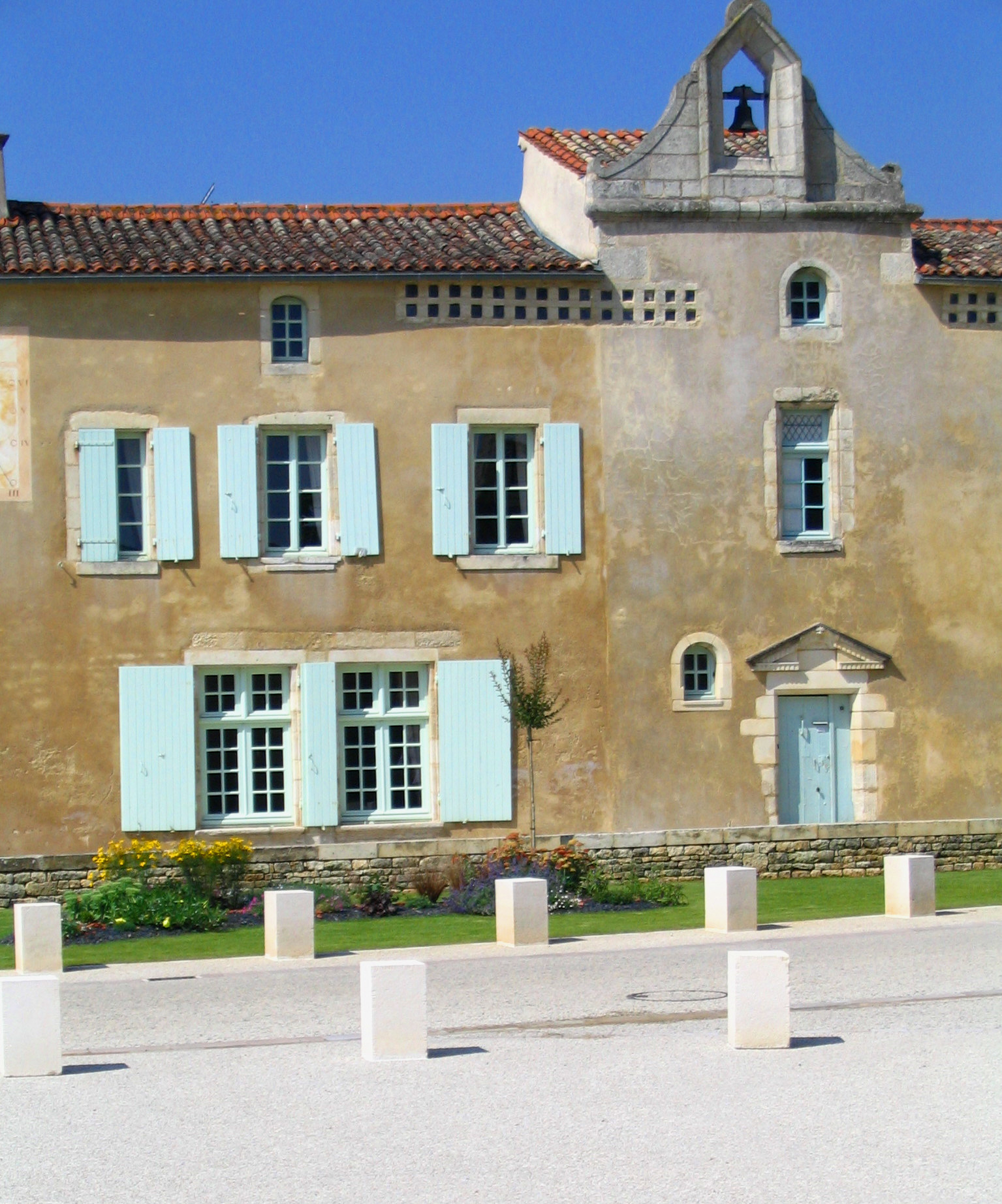
- Houses on the church square of Nieul-sur-l'Autise
- Location of Rives-d'Autise
- Location within France Location within Pays de la Loire
- Coordinates: 46°25′28″N 0°40′41″W
- Country: France
- Region: Pays de la Loire
- Department: Vendée
- Arrondissement: Fontenay-le-Comte
- Canton: Fontenay-le-Comte
- Intercommunality: Vendée Sèvre Autise

Government
  - Mayor (2020–2026): Michel Bossard
- Area^{1}: 32.03 km^{2} (12.37 sq mi)
- Highest elevation: 58 m (190 ft)
- Lowest elevation: 4 m (13 ft)
- Population (2023): 2,036
  - Density: 63.57/km^{2} (164.6/sq mi)
- Time zone: UTC+01:00 (CET)
  - Summer (DST): UTC+02:00 (CEST)
- INSEE/Postal code: 85162 /85240
- ^{1} French Land Register data, which excludes lakes, ponds, glaciers > 1 km^{2} (0.386 sq mi or 247 acres) and river estuaries.

Rives-d'Autise (French pronunciation: [ʁiv dotiz]) is a commune in the Vendée department in the Pays de la Loire region in western France. It was established on 1 January 2019 by merger of the former communes of Nieul-sur-l'Autise (the seat) and Oulmes.

== Population ==
Population data refer to the area corresponding with the commune as of January 2025.

Historical population
Year	Pop.	±% p.a.
1968	1,459	—
1975	1,421	−0.38%
1982	1,479	+0.57%
1990	1,534	+0.46%
1999	1,624	+0.64%
2007	1,869	+1.77%
2012	2,039	+1.76%
2017	2,118	+0.76%
2023	2,036	−0.66%
Source: INSEE

== See also ==
- Communes of the Vendée department
