= Yannick Moreau =

French politician (born 1975)

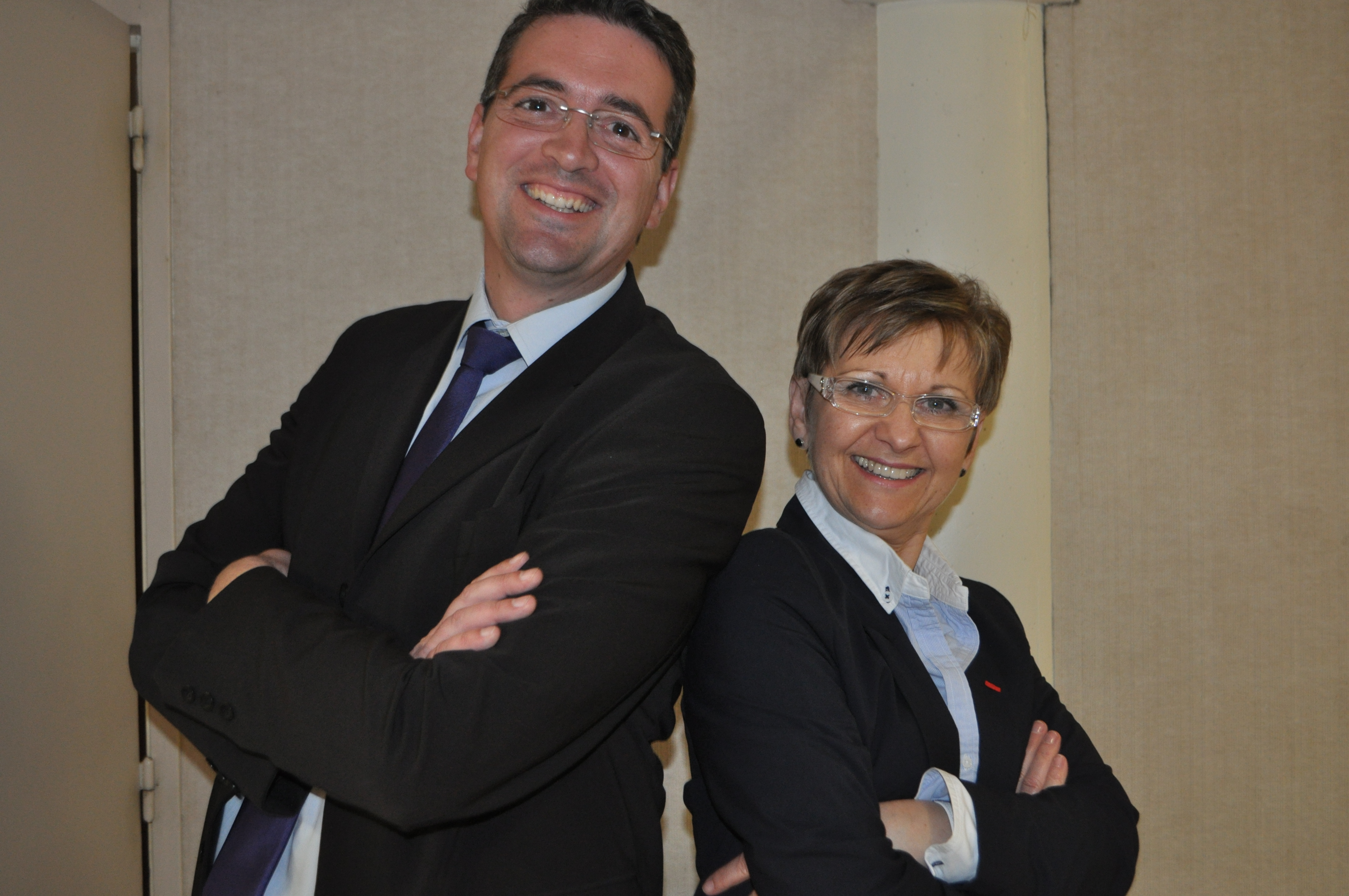
- Moreau in 2012

Member of the French National Assembly for Vendée's 3rd constituency
- In office 20 June 2012 – 20 June 2017
- Preceded by: Louis Guédon
- Succeeded by: Stéphane Buchou

Personal details
- Born: 4 August 1975 (age 50)
- Party: Independent
- Other political affiliations: Miscellaneous right

Yannick Moreau (French pronunciation: [janik mɔʁo]; born 4 August 1975) is a French politician. From 2012 to 2017, he was a member of the National Assembly. From 2019 to 2025, he served as mayor of Les Sables-d'Olonne.
