= Oulmes, Vendée =

Oulmes
- Part of Rives-d'Autise
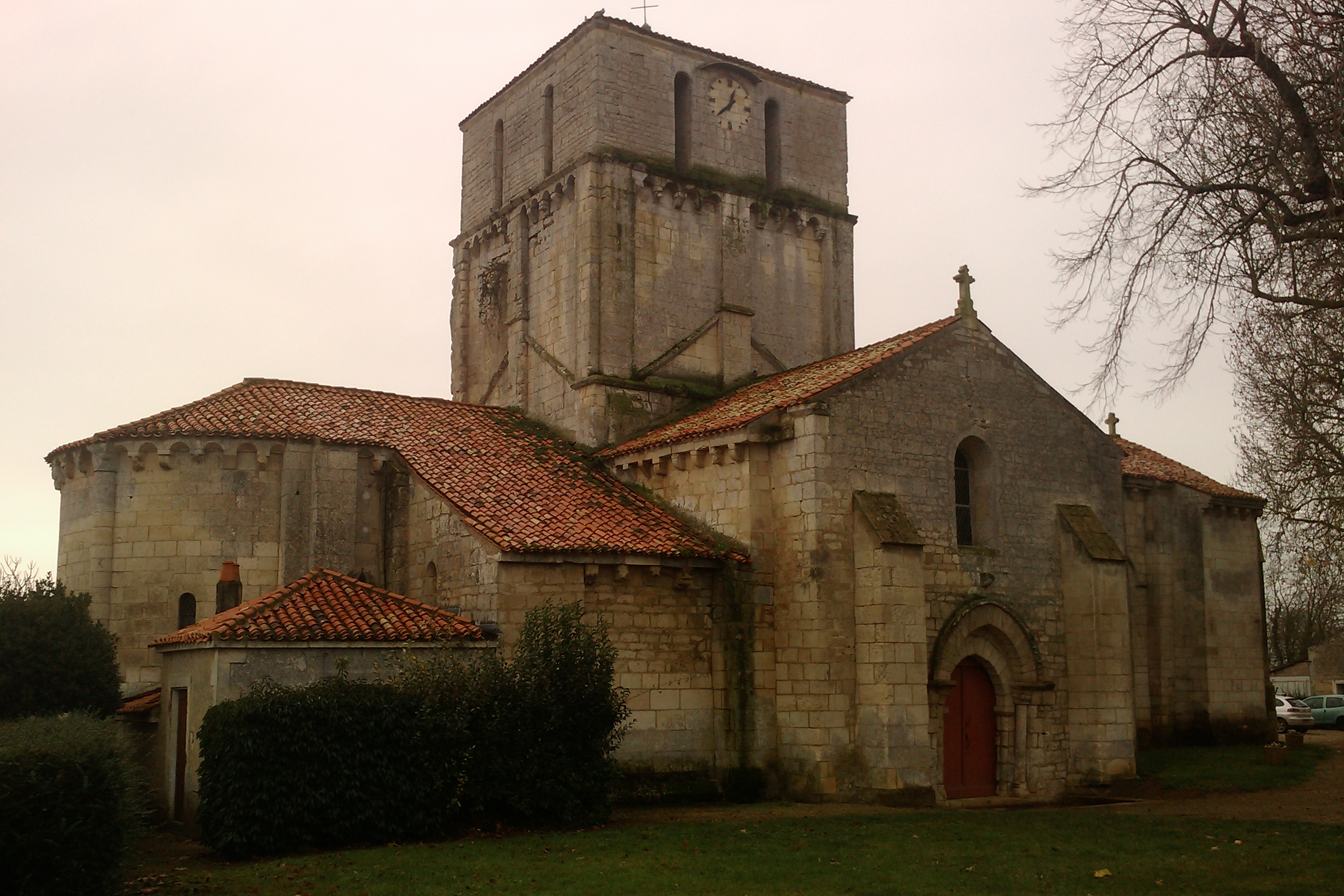
- The church of Our Lady, in Oulmes
- Location of Oulmes
- Location within France Location within Pays de la Loire
- Coordinates: 46°24′02″N 0°39′45″W
- Country: France
- Region: Pays de la Loire
- Department: Vendée
- Arrondissement: Fontenay-le-Comte
- Canton: Fontenay-le-Comte
- Commune: Rives-d'Autise
- Area^{1}: 9.28 km^{2} (3.58 sq mi)
- Highest elevation: 48 m (157 ft)
- Lowest elevation: 4 m (13 ft)
- Population (2022): 792
  - Density: 85.3/km^{2} (221/sq mi)
- Time zone: UTC+01:00 (CET)
  - Summer (DST): UTC+02:00 (CEST)
- Postal code: 85420
- ^{1} French Land Register data, which excludes lakes, ponds, glaciers > 1 km^{2} (0.386 sq mi or 247 acres) and river estuaries.

Oulmes (French pronunciation: [ulm]) is a former commune in the Vendée department in the Pays de la Loire region in western France. On 1 January 2019, it was merged into the new commune Rives-d'Autise.

Oulmes is located on the D148 road between Fontenay-le-Comte (14 km to the north west)) and Niort (18 km to the south east), and just north of the A83 motorway ‘Routes des Estuaires’ (Estuary route).

As well as the church of Notre Dame, Oulmes has a former chapel of St Thomas, and a former priory in the rue de la Venise Verte. The church has a bell dating from 1642, given by François de la Rochefoucauld, seigneur de Marcillac.

The village primary school is in the Allée des Maléons.

Since 1965, Oulmes has been served by the police station at Maillezais, 8 km to the south west. The house at 48, Rue Georges Clémenceau was the Gendarmerie (police station ) for Oulmes 1904–1965.

In 1881, the Fontenay-le-Comte to Benet railway line opened, with a station at Nieul-Oulmes. The line closed in 1969, and the station building was demolished in 1985, although the street name ‘rue de la Gare’ (Station Road) remains.

== See also ==
- Communes of the Vendée department
