= Benet, Vendée =

Benet
- Commune
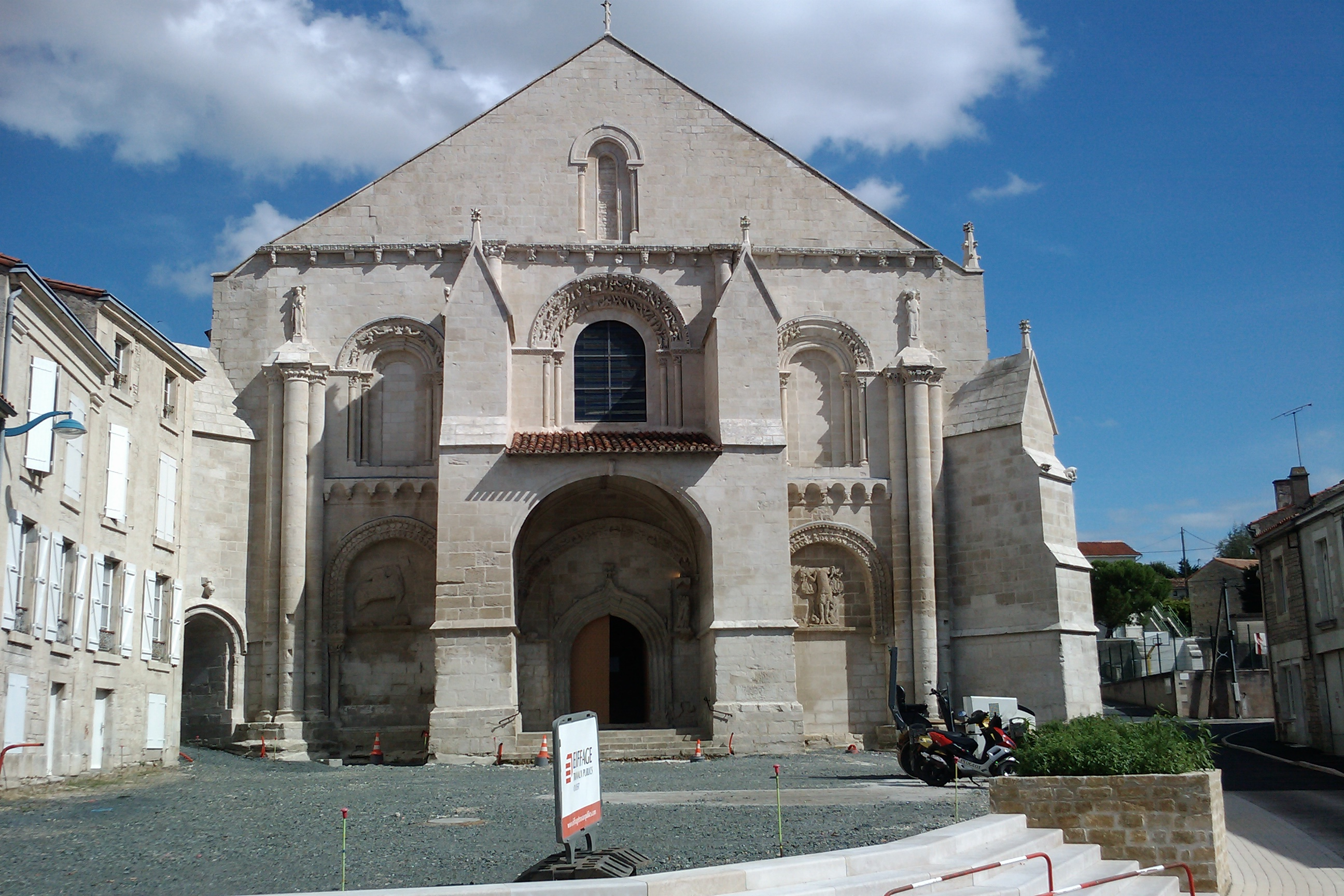
- The Church of Sainte-Eulalie, in Benet
- Location of Benet
- Location within France Location within Pays de la Loire
- Coordinates: 46°22′06″N 0°35′46″W
- Country: France
- Region: Pays de la Loire
- Department: Vendée
- Arrondissement: Fontenay-le-Comte
- Canton: Fontenay-le-Comte

Government
  - Mayor (2023–2026): Camille Fontaine
- Area^{1}: 50.01 km^{2} (19.31 sq mi)
- Elevation: 44 m (144 ft)
- Population (2023): 4,089
  - Density: 81.76/km^{2} (211.8/sq mi)
- Time zone: UTC+01:00 (CET)
  - Summer (DST): UTC+02:00 (CEST)
- INSEE/Postal code: 85020 /85490
- ^{1} French Land Register data, which excludes lakes, ponds, glaciers > 1 km^{2} (0.386 sq mi or 247 acres) and river estuaries.

Benet (French pronunciation: [bənɛ]) is a commune in the Vendée department in the Pays de la Loire region in western France.

The former communes of Lesson, Sainte-Christine and Aziré were joined to the commune of Benet in 1973.

== Geography ==
Close to Niort (11 kilometres or 7 miles) in Deux-Sèvres and Fontenay-le-Comte (19 km or 12 mi) in Vendée, Benet is located near :

- South-Vendée
- Poitevin Marsh
- Atlantic Coast

The commune's geography includes limestone plains and the marshes of Sainte-Christine, Aziré, and Nessier.

The Vrizon is the underground river that goes through the commune.

Benet is located close to the A83 and A10 motorways, connecting the commune to some major cities, as Nantes (130 km or 81 mi), Poitiers (98 km or 61 mi), Bordeaux (193 km or 120 mi), or Paris (428 km or 266 mi). Benet is also situated 64 km (40 mi) from the tourist city of La Rochelle.

== History ==
- Benet was formerly named Benet-les-Noyers.
- Former seat of a canton until 1801–1802, Benet has ultimately integrated the Canton of Maillezais.
- The communes of Lesson, Aziré and Sainte-Christine merged with the commune of Benet in 1973.

== List of mayors ==
Period	Identity	Party
2001 - 2023	Daniel David	Socialist Party
2023 -	Camille Fontaine	

== Demography ==
Population data refer to the area corresponding with the commune as of January 2025.

Historical population
Year	Pop.	±% p.a.
1968	2,583	—
1975	2,761	+0.96%
1982	3,062	+1.49%
1990	3,224	+0.65%
1999	3,202	−0.08%
2007	3,565	+1.35%
2012	3,853	+1.57%
2017	4,011	+0.81%
2023	4,089	+0.32%
Source: INSEE

== Monuments ==
The Sainte-Eulalie Church, on the historical register, constitutes an unmissable stage in the tour of the Romance Churches and Abbeys of the region.

A few kilometres away, it is possible to visit the historic site of the Maillezais Cathedral.

A wind farm was created near Lesson in 2007, and several months later, a second was established 3 km (2 mi) away from the first. A total of ten wind turbines overhang the commune.

== Notable people ==
- Jean-Paul Ribreau (born 1957), former professional footballer

== Twin towns ==
- Sundern, Germany

== Events ==
- Each first Sunday of July, the "Fête du Préfou" is organized in the harbor of Aziré.
- In November, is organized the traditional "Foire aux alouettes" (Lark Fair).

== See also ==
- Communes of the Vendée department
