= Vendée's 3rd constituency =

Constituency of the National Assembly of France

3rd constituency of Vendée
- inline Constituency of the National Assembly of France

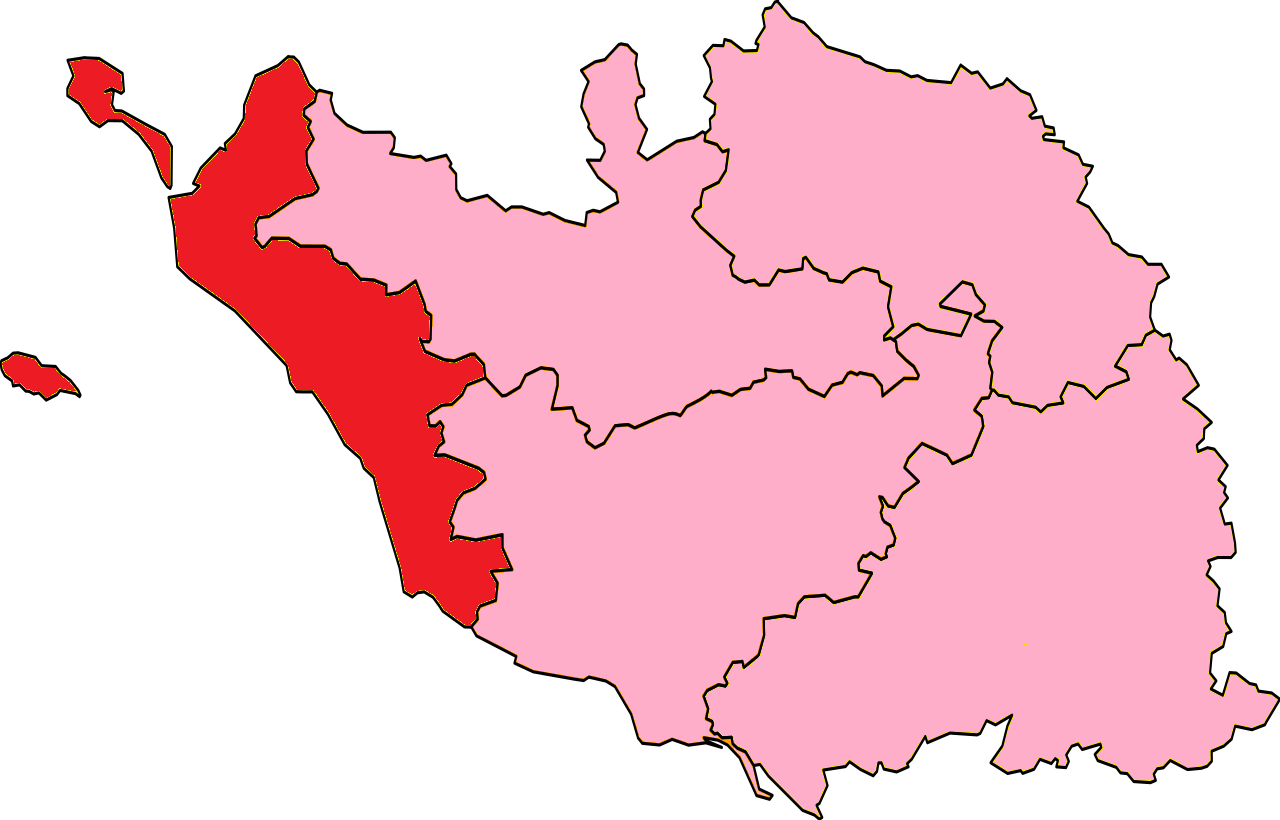
- Vendée's 3rd Constituency shown within Vendée
- Deputy: Stéphane Buchou; RE
- Department: Vendée
- Cantons: Beauvoir-sur-Mer, L'Ile-d'Yeu, Noirmoutier-en-l'Ile, Les Sables-d'Olonne, Saint-Gilles-Croix-de-Vie, Saint-Jean-de-Monts
- Registered voters: 122015

The 3rd constituency of the Vendée (French: Troisième circonscription de la Vendée) is a French legislative constituency in the Vendée département. Like the other 576 French constituencies, it elects one MP using the two-round system, with a run-off if no candidate receives over 50% of the vote in the first round.

== Description ==
The 3rd Constituency of the Vendée runs along the Atlantic coast of the department, including the coastal town of Saint-Jean-de-Monts and the island of Noirmoutier-en-l'Île.

The seat supported conservative candidates throughout its history until 2017 when it elected an En Marche deputy.

== Assembly Members ==
Election	Member	Party
1988	Pierre Mauger	RPR
1993	Louis Guédon	RPR
1997	Louis Guédon	RPR
2002	Louis Guédon	UMP
2007	Louis Guédon	UMP
2012	Louis Guédon	UMP
2017	Stéphane Buchou	LREM
2022	Stéphane Buchou	RE

== Election results ==
=== 2024 ===
Candidate	Party	Alliance	First round		Second round	
Candidate	Party	Alliance	Votes	%	Votes	%
Stéphane Buchou	REN	Ensemble	32,889	34.89	52,496	56.43
Pascal Dubin	LR	UXD	33,545	35.59	40,530	43.57
Pascale Marchand	LFI	NFP	15,466	16.41		
Noël Faucher	LR	DVD	8,221	8.72		
Eric Mauvoisin-Delavaud	Ind	DSV	1,895	2.01		
Armelle Guénolé	DLF	DSV	1,428	1.51		
Philippe Festien	LO		817	0.87		
Valid votes			94,261	97.08	93,026	94.99
Blank votes			1,833	1.94	3,402	3.47
Null votes			954	0.98	3,402	3.47
Turnout			97,098	70.93	97,929	71.54
Abstentions			39,795	29.07	38,958	28.46
Registered voters			136,893		136,887	
Result			REN HOLD			

=== 2022 ===
Legislative Election 2022: Vendée's 3rd constituency
Party	Candidate	Votes	%	±%
LREM (Ensemble)	Stéphane Buchou	23,870	36.07	-3.06
RN	Corinne Fillet	14,154	21.39	+9.49
LFI (NUPÉS)	Aurélien Mauger	11,546	17.45	+1.88
LR (UDC)	Alain Blanchard	10,475	15.83	+0.76
DVE	Benhamin Andre	2,884	4.36	N/A
DLF (UPF)	Armelle Guenole	1,355	2.05	+0.04
Others	N/A	1,889	2.05	
Turnout		66,173	49.93	−2.28
2nd round result
LREM (Ensemble)	Stéphane Buchou	36,145	61.48	+1.32
RN	Corinne Fillet	22,644	38.52	N/A
Turnout		58,789	47.26	+6.47
LREM hold				

=== 2017 ===
Legislative Election 2017: Vendée's 3rd constituency
Party	Candidate	Votes	%	±%
LREM	Stéphane Buchou	24,930	39.13	
LR	Florence Pineau	9,600	15.07	
DVD	Noël Faucher	8,497	13.34	
FN	Corinne Fillet	7,578	11.90	
LFI	Alain Darmey	5,414	8.50	
PS	Anthony Pitalier	2,540	3.99	
EELV	Laurent Akriche	1,960	3.08	
DLF	Catherine Bessonnet	1,283	2.01	
Others	N/A	1,902		
Turnout		63,704	52.21	
2nd round result
LREM	Stéphane Buchou	29,940	60.16	
LR	Florence Pineau	19,825	39.84	
Turnout		49,765	40.79	
LREM gain from DVD				

=== 2012 ===
Legislative Election 2012: Vendée's 3rd constituency
Party	Candidate	Votes	%	±%
UMP	Louis Guédon	19,357	28.93	
DVD	Yannick Moreau	13,097	19.58	
DVG	Jacques Fraisse	11,903	17.79	
EELV	Claudine Goichon	7,870	11.76	
FN	Danièle Vouzellaud	6,895	10.31	
FG	Olivier Lineatte	2,343	3.50	
MoDem	Christian Praud	2,083	3.11	
DVD	Philippe Comte	1,407	2.10	
Others	N/A	1,944		
Turnout		66,899	58.75	
2nd round result
DVD	Yannick Moreau	26,359	54.22	
UMP	Louis Guédon	22,260	45.78	
Turnout		48,619	42.70	
DVD gain from UMP				

=== 2007 ===
Legislative Election 2007: Vendée's 3rd constituency
Party	Candidate	Votes	%	±%
UMP	Louis Guédon	34,133	52.74	
PS	Jacques Baud	11,692	18.07	
MoDem	Xavier Gerbaud	5,514	8.52	
DVD	Olivier D'Audiffret	2,300	3.55	
LV	Françoise Gilbert	2,144	3.31	
FN	Danièle Vouzellaud	2,004	3.10	
PCF	Frédérique Marsal	1,717	2.65	
Others	N/A	5,210		
Turnout		66,074	60.90	
UMP hold				

=== 2002 ===
Legislative Election 2002: Vendée's 3rd constituency
Party	Candidate	Votes	%	±%
UMP	Louis Guédon	30,838	51.63	
PS	Jacques Fraisse	15,100	25.28	
FN	Danièle Vouzellaud	5,208	8.72	
LV	Catherine Boudigou	1,988	3.33	
CPNT	Gilles Douillard	1,701	2.85	
Others	N/A	4,890		
Turnout		60,941	63.04	
UMP hold				

=== 1997 ===
Legislative Election 1997: Vendée's 3rd constituency
Party	Candidate	Votes	%	±%
RPR	Louis Guédon	23,604	43.31	
PS	Jacques Fraisse	15,141	27.78	
FN	Paul Petitdidier	7,851	14.41	
LV	Bernard Massuyeau	2,632	4.83	
PCF	Yann Massonnet	2,522	4.63	
MEI	Françoise Rondeau	1,555	2.85	
DIV	Guy Barrier	1,192	2.19	
Turnout		58,183	67.45	
2nd round result
RPR	Louis Guédon	31,868	57.16	
PS	Jacques Fraisse	23,887	42.84	
Turnout		59,421	68.89	
RPR hold				
