= Vendée's 2nd constituency =

Constituency of the National Assembly of France

2nd constituency of Vendée
- inline Constituency of the National Assembly of France

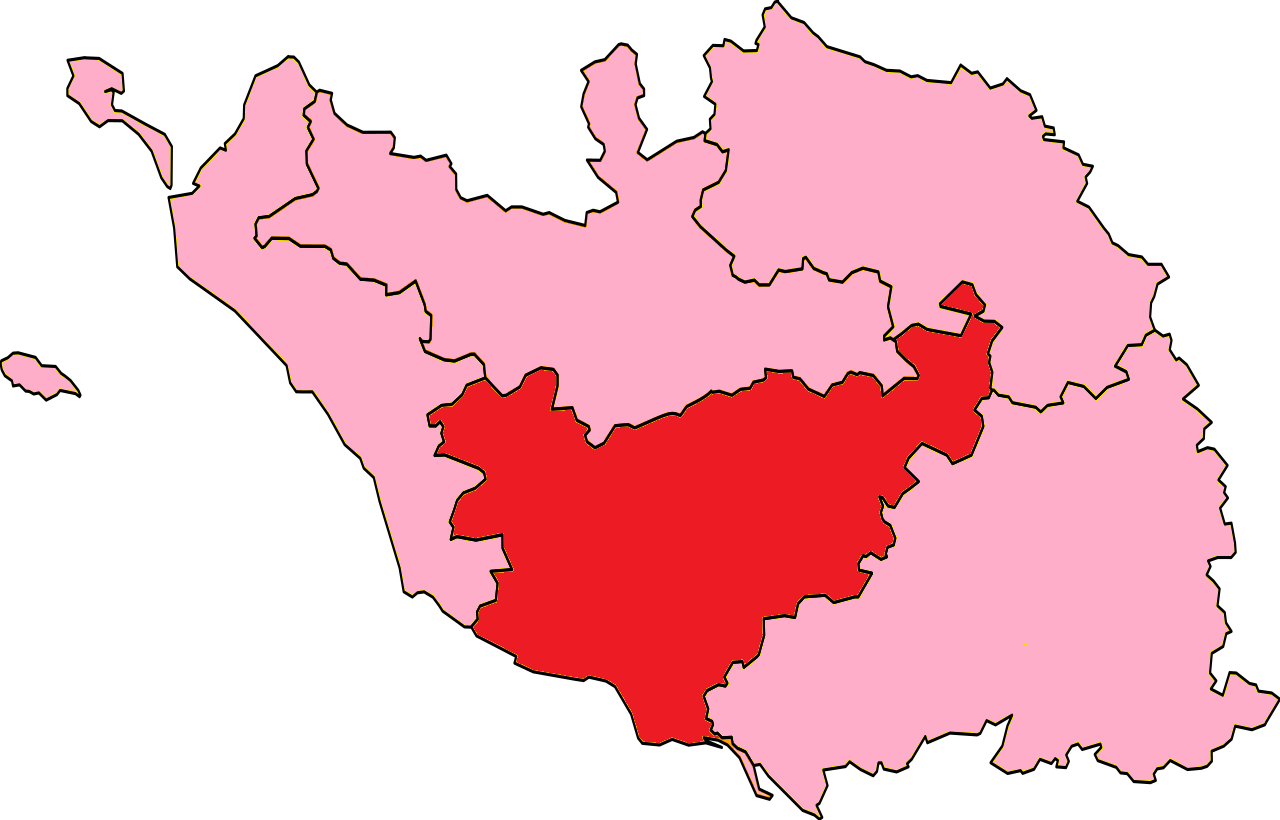
- Vendée's 2nd Constituency shown within Vendée
- Deputy: Vacant
- Department: Vendée
- Cantons: Chantonnay, Mareuil-sur-Lay-Dissais, La Mothe-Achard, Moutiers-les-Mauxfaits, La Roche-sur-Yon Sud, Talmont-Saint-Hilaire
- Registered voters: 109665

The 2nd constituency of Vendée is a French legislative constituency in the Vendée département. It elects one MP to the National Assembly of France.

== Description ==
The 2nd Constituency of Vendée stretches from the southern half of La Roche-sur-Yon to the southern edge of the department.

Between 1988 and 2012 this constituency consistently returned conservative centre-right candidates.to the National Assembly. In 2012 the seat elected a Socialist Party deputy for the first time, followed in 2017 by Patricia Gallerneau of the MoDem.

Patricia Gallerneau, a member of the MoDem and related group, was elected to this constituency following the 2017 elections. She died from cancer in July 2019 and was replaced by her substitute Patrick Loiseau, who sits in the same group. Loiseau lost his seat in the 2022 election, and was succeeded by Béatrice Bellamy, who also died from cancer in May 2026.

== Assembly Members ==
Election	Member	Party
1988	Philippe Mestre	UDF
1993	Philippe Mestre	UDF
1997	Dominique Caillaud	DVD
2002	Dominique Caillaud	UMP
2007	Dominique Caillaud	UMP
2012	Sylviane Bulteau	PS
2017	Patricia Gallerneau	MoDem
2019	Patrick Loiseau	MoDem
2022	Béatrice Bellamy	H

== Election results ==
=== 2024 ===
Candidate	Party	Alliance	First round		Second round	
Candidate	Party	Alliance	Votes	%	Votes	%
Béatrice Bellamy	REN	Ensemble	30,262	38.74	46,240	60.37
Marie-Christine Ebran	RN		28,538	36.53	30,357	39.63
Nicolas Helary	LFI	NFP	18,234	23.34		
Sophie Barillot	LO		1,081	1.28		
Valid votes			78,115	96.90	76,777	95.24
Blank votes			1,703	2.11	2,768	3.43
Null votes			792	0.98	1,069	1.33
Turnout			80,610	70.66	80,614	70.65
Abstentions			33,474	29.34	33,483	29.35
Registered voters			114,084		114,097	
Result			HOR HOLD			

=== 2022 ===
Legislative Election 2022: Vendée's 2nd constituency
Party	Candidate	Votes	%	±%
HOR (Ensemble)	Béatrice Bellamy	14,334	25.97	-10.19
LFI (NUPÉS)	Nicolas Helary	12,053	21.84	-3.58
RN	Franck Laloue	9,665	17.51	+6.31
LR (UDC)	Maxence De Rugy	9,572	17.34	+0.65
DVE	Ninon Greau	2,568	4.65	N/A
LREM	Patrick Loiseau*	2,195	3.98	N/A
REC	Brigitte Neveux	2,157	3.91	N/A
Others	N/A	2,656	4.81	
Turnout		55,200	50.50	−1.36
2nd round result
HOR (Ensemble)	Béatrice Bellamy	28,722	58.42	-1.16
LFI (NUPÉS)	Nicolas Helary	20,441	41.58	N/A
Turnout		49,163	48.11	+9.59
HOR gain from MoDem				

* LREM dissident not supported by the Ensemble Citoyens alliance

=== 2017 ===
Legislative Election 2017: Vendée's 2nd constituency
Party	Candidate	Votes	%	±%
MoDem	Patricia Gallerneau	19,405	36.16	
LR	Béatrice Bellamy	8,957	16.69	
PS	Sylviane Bulteau	6,425	11.97	
FN	Gabriel De Chabot	6,012	11.20	
LFI	Dominique Chevolleau	5,329	9.93	
DVD	Raoul Mestre	3,077	5.73	
EELV	Michel Raynaud	1,889	3.52	
Others	N/A	2,573		
Turnout		53,667	51.86	
2nd round result
MoDem	Patricia Gallerneau	23,748	59.58	
LR	Béatrice Bellamy	16,113	40.42	
Turnout		39,861	38.52	
MoDem gain from PS				

=== 2012 ===
Legislative Election 2012: Vendée's 2nd constituency
Party	Candidate	Votes	%	±%
PS	Sylviane Bulteau	22,999	39.06	
UMP	Dominique Caillaud	20,190	34.29	
FN	Brigitte Neveux	6,024	10.23	
DVD	Raoul Mestre	3,358	5.70	
FG	Jocelyn Abjean	2,125	3.61	
EELV	Marie-Yannick Brizar Le Borgne	1,488	2.53	
Others	N/A	2,699		
Turnout		58,883	60.17	
2nd round result
PS	Sylviane Bulteau	29,265	51.79	
UMP	Dominique Caillaud	27,241	48.21	
Turnout		56,506	57.74	
PS gain from UMP				

=== 2007 ===
Legislative Election 2007: Vendée's 2nd constituency
Party	Candidate	Votes	%	±%
UMP	Dominique Caillaud	26,649	46.77	
PS	Sylviane Bulteau	16,471	28.91	
MoDem	Raoul Mestre	6,067	10.65	
LV	Yann Helary	2,023	3.55	
FN	Georges Kouskoff	1,268	2.23	
Others	N/A	4,505		
Turnout		58,443	63.68	
2nd round result
UMP	Dominique Caillaud	29,393	54.78	
PS	Sylviane Bulteau	24,263	45.22	
Turnout		55,226	60.18	
UMP hold				

=== 2002 ===
Legislative Election 2002: Vendée's 2nd constituency
Party	Candidate	Votes	%	±%
UMP	Dominique Caillaud	23,634	43.41	
PS	Sylviane Bulteau	15,372	28.23	
DVD	Raoul Mestre	4,776	8.77	
FN	Jean-Marie Dieulangard	3,442	6.32	
LV	Yann Helary	1,699	3.12	
CPNT	Nathalie Botton	1,253	2.30	
DVE	Philippe Boursier	1,137	2.09	
Others	N/A	3,136		
Turnout		56,012	67.22	
2nd round result
UMP	Dominique Caillaud	28,150	58.28	
PS	Sylviane Bulteau	20,151	41.72	
Turnout		49,742	59.70	
UMP gain from DVD				

=== 1997 ===
Legislative Election 1997: Vendée's 2nd constituency
Party	Candidate	Votes	%	±%
PS	Josiane Migeon	12,708	25.28	
DVD	Dominique Caillaud	10,386	20.66	
UDF	Bernard Suaud	10,127	20.15	
DVD	Raoul Mestre	4,637	9.22	
FN	Guillaume Vouzellaud	4,517	8.99	
LV	Annick Tarot	3,681	7.32	
PCF	Jean-Claude Martineau	2,965	5.90	
DIV	Yvonne Péon	1,046	2.08	
Others	N/A	201		
Turnout		54,538	72.26	
2nd round result
DVD	Dominique Caillaud	28,669	54.92	
PS	Josiane Migeon	23,535	45.08	
Turnout		55,838	73.98	
DVD gain from UDF				
