= Patricia Gallerneau =

French politician (1954–2019)

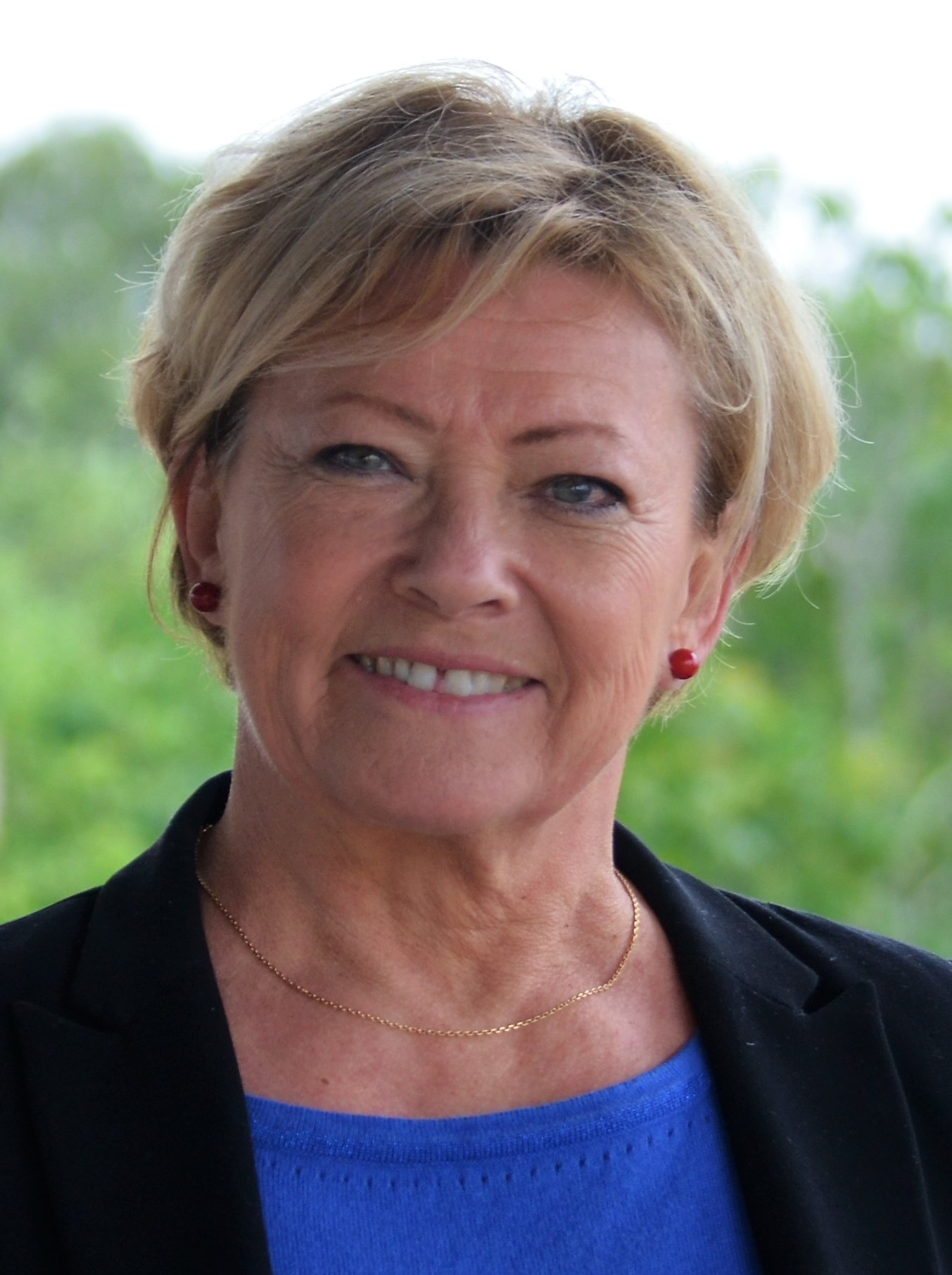

Member of the National Assembly for Vendée's 2nd constituency
- In office 18 June 2017 – 7 July 2019
- Preceded by: Sylviane Bulteau
- Succeeded by: Patrick Loiseau

Member of the Pays de la Loire's Regional council
- In office 18 December 2015 – 1 April 2018

Councilor of Pornichet
- In office 25 June 1995 – 7 October 1999

Personal details
- Born: 9 September 1954 Paris 20^{e}, France
- Died: 7 July 2019 (aged 64)
- Party: MoDem

Patricia Gallerneau (9 September 1954 – 7 July 2019) was a French politician representing the Democratic Movement. She was elected to the French National Assembly on 18 June 2017, representing the department of Vendée.

== Early life and education ==
Patricia Gallerneau was born in the 20th arrondissement of Paris to a Finisterian mother and a Correzian father. The latter was elected by the Rassemblement pour la République in Angers.

== Political career ==
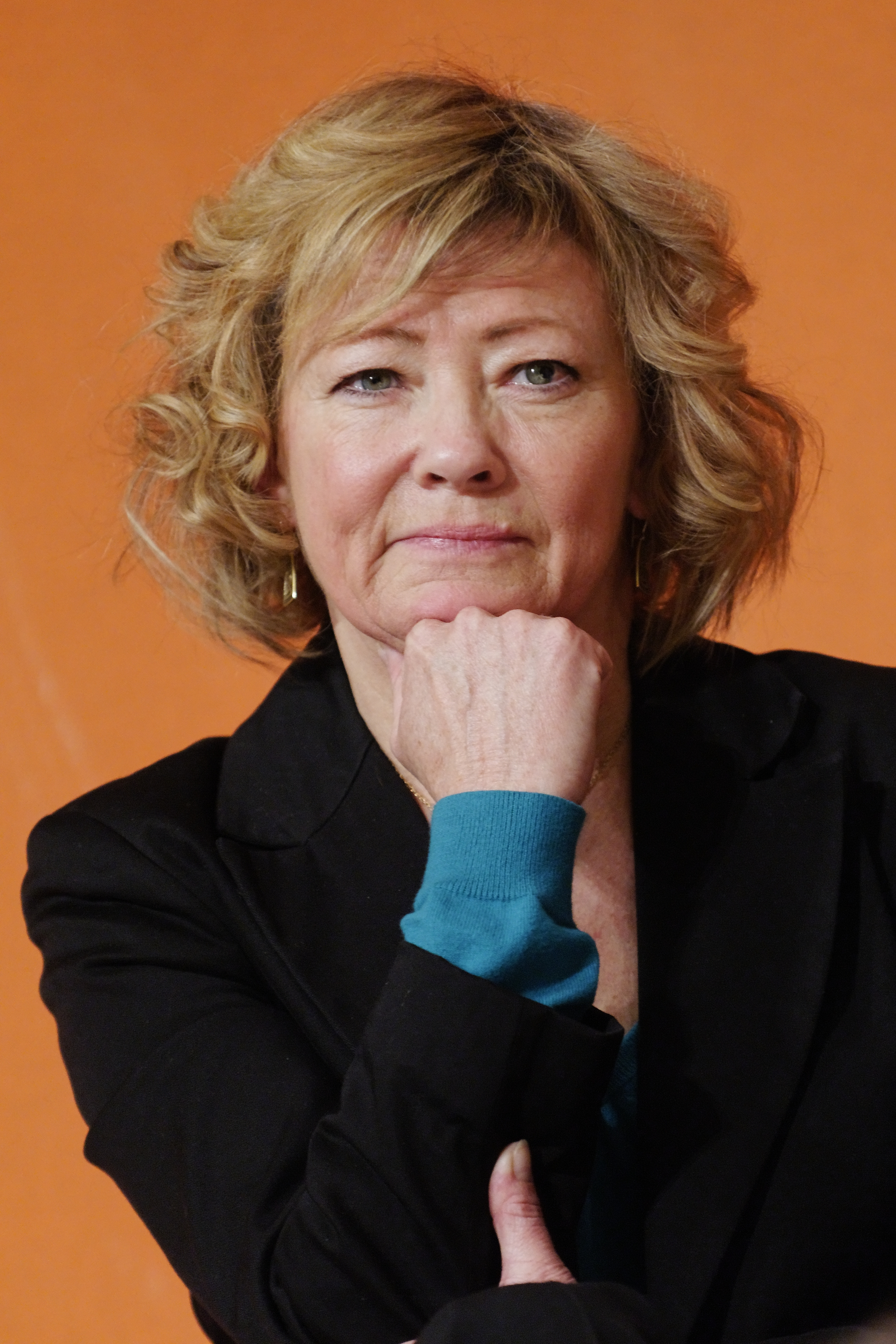
Patricia Gallerneau at the MoDem launch rally of the 2010 French regional elections campaign in Paris.

In the municipal elections of 1995, Patricia Gallerneau is elected on the list led by the socialist Jacques Lambert in Pornichet. On 7 October 1999, she resigned from the municipal council, "not [wishing] to endorse the decisions of a few".

After joining the Greens Party in 1999, she became the candidate invested by the movement in the 2002 legislative elections in the seventh district of Loire-Atlantique. It is in fifth place and holds 2.61% of the vote. Under the same label, she is a candidate in the cantonal elections of 2004 in the canton of La Baule-Escoublac, where she achieves 8,01% of the votes.

In the legislative elections of 2007, she received the nomination of the Democratic Movement in the seventh district of Loire-Atlantique. 7.10% of the votes are on his candidacy in the first round. The following year, Patricia Gallerneau is leading the list "Pornichet-A-venir" - called "apolitical", supported and invested by the Modem, - in the municipal elections in Pornichet. The list is in last place with 27.40% of the vote, behind the one led by outgoing mayor Jacques Lambert, and withdraws in the second round.

After the refusal of Laurent Gérault to be the top of the list in the 2010 regional elections despite the appointment of the National Office of the Democratic Movement, Patricia Gallerneau is chosen to lead the list of the movement. It fails to reach the 5% of the votes (4.64%).

In the legislative elections of 2012, she is a candidate "The Center for France" in a seventh district of the Loire-Atlantique remodeled by the electoral division of 2009; it obtains 2.28% of the vote.

She again conducts a "Pornichet Avenir" list in the 2014 municipal elections, obtains 12.29% of the vote and removes her list from the second round. In the same year, she also ran for Jean Arthuis in the European elections in the West as part of the "L'Alternative" coalition.

Named leader of the Democratic Movement in Pays-de-la-Loire in April 2015, Patricia Gallerneau sealed an agreement with Bruno Retailleau, invested by the Union for a Popular Movement and supported by the Union of Democrats. and independent: six candidates, including three in eligible position are placed on the list of the senator of the Vendée, called "union of the right and the center". It occupies the seventh position on the list conducted in the Loire-Atlantique by Laurence Garnier. She is one of the two elected Modem at the regional level of December 2015.

In the spring of 2017, Patricia Gallerneau declares to give up her mandate as regional councilor in case of election to the National Assembly. His resignation should follow the validation of his campaign accounts by the National Commission for Campaign Accounts and Political Financing. In March 2018, it is announced for implementation on the following 1 April; Xavier Rineau (The Republicans), deputy mayor of Pallet succeeds him to the regional council.

=== Member of the National Assembly ===
Following the election of Emmanuel Macron, The Republic in Progress (LREM) invests in the second constituency of the Vendée in a second wave of investitures, 15 May 2017, then that a "solid and balanced" agreement is concluded between the Modem and LREM on 12 May. The electoral district of Patricia Gallerneau was chosen by François Bayrou because of his domiciliation, his status as a woman and her quality of elected. In the first round of legislative elections, it came first with 36.16% of the votes cast. She was elected with 59.58% in the second round against Béatrice Bellamy (The Republicans).

Her term began on 21 June following, Patricia Gallerneau sits from 27 June, date of the opening session of the fifteenth legislature. It is affiliated with the Democratic Movement and Related Group. The declaration of interests and activities of Patricia Gallerneau, signed on 30 June and published in October 2017, indicates no income from professional activity. However, the member receives an allowance related to her term on the Regional Council.

As the first member of the Committee on Finance, General Economy and Budget Control on 29 June 2017, she joined the Commission of Social Affairs on 18 July. She resigned on 20 July 2017, but reinstated to the committee on the proposal of her parliamentary group.

== Sickness and death ==
Suffering from cancer, she was inactive in the National Assembly from January 2019. She died of her illness on 6 July. Her death was announced the following day.

Reacting to her death, President Emmanuel Macron saluted "...the memory of a woman who has devoted her entire career to public service, has been committed to her territory and has represented our nation by bringing republican values to life and by strongly carrying causes that are among the great challenges of our century".
