= Oulmes =

Oulmes may refer to:

== Brands ==
- Oulmes Mineral Water (Les Eaux Minérales d'Oulmès): A Moroccan brand of naturally carbonated, bottled mineral water (aka as seltzer)

== Places ==
- Oulmes, Vendée: A French commune in the Vendée department
- Oulmes, Morocco: A town in Morocco
