= Dominique Caillaud =

French politician

Dominique Caillaud (born 20 May 1946, in L'Herbergement, Vendée) is a member of the National Assembly of France. He represents the Vendée department, and is a member of the Union for a Popular Movement.
