= Cantons of the Vendée department =

The following is a list of the 17 cantons of the Vendée department, in France, following the French canton reorganisation which came into effect in March 2015:

- Aizenay
- Challans
- Chantonnay
- La Châtaigneraie
- Fontenay-le-Comte
- Les Herbiers
- L'Île-d'Yeu
- Luçon
- Mareuil-sur-Lay-Dissais
- Montaigu-Vendée
- Mortagne-sur-Sèvre
- La Roche-sur-Yon-1
- La Roche-sur-Yon-2
- Les Sables-d'Olonne
- Saint-Hilaire-de-Riez
- Saint-Jean-de-Monts
- Talmont-Saint-Hilaire
