= Patrick Loiseau =

French politician (born 1960)

Member of the National Assembly for Vendée's 2nd constituency
- In office 8 July 2019 – 21 June 2022
- Preceded by: Patricia Gallerneau
- Succeeded by: Béatrice Bellamy

Personal details
- Born: 8 May 1960 (age 65) Luçon, Vendée, France
- Party: MoDem

Patrick Loiseau (born 8 May 1960) is a French politician who served as a member of the National Assembly from 2019 to 2022, representing Vendée's 2nd constituency. As her substitute, he replaced Patricia Gallerneau in Parliament after she died.

== Biography ==
Patrick Loiseau holds a postgraduate degree (DEA) in law and Political science. He is a senior civil servant in the Vendée region, specializing in social action and social housing.

He joined Renaissance (French political party) in 2016. In the 2017 legislative elections, he ran in the second district of Vendée as the alternate for Patricia Gallerneau (MoDem), who was elected deputy and whom he succeeded after her death on July 6, 2019. She resigned the day before so that a by-election could be held, but as her letter was received after her death, Patrick Loiseau ultimately succeeded her. An appeal lodged by Raoul-François Mestre before the Constitutional Council (France) concerning his appointment as deputy was rejected on September 26, 2019, with the Council declaring itself incompetent.

Although a member of Renaissance, Patrick Loiseau joined the Democratic Movement and Affiliates group in September 2019, which Patricia Gallerneau was already a member of. In September 2020, having been affiliated with The Democrats group since 2019, he became a full member of the group. He sits on the National Defense and Armed Forces Committee.

During the 2022 legislative elections, while running for re-election, he did not receive the nomination of the Ensemble. He nevertheless decided to maintain his candidacy, denouncing the “electoral opportunism” of the candidate who had received the nomination. On June 12, 2022, Patrick Loiseau obtained only 3.96% of the vote.
