= Nieul-sur-l'Autise =

- Part of Rives-d'Autise
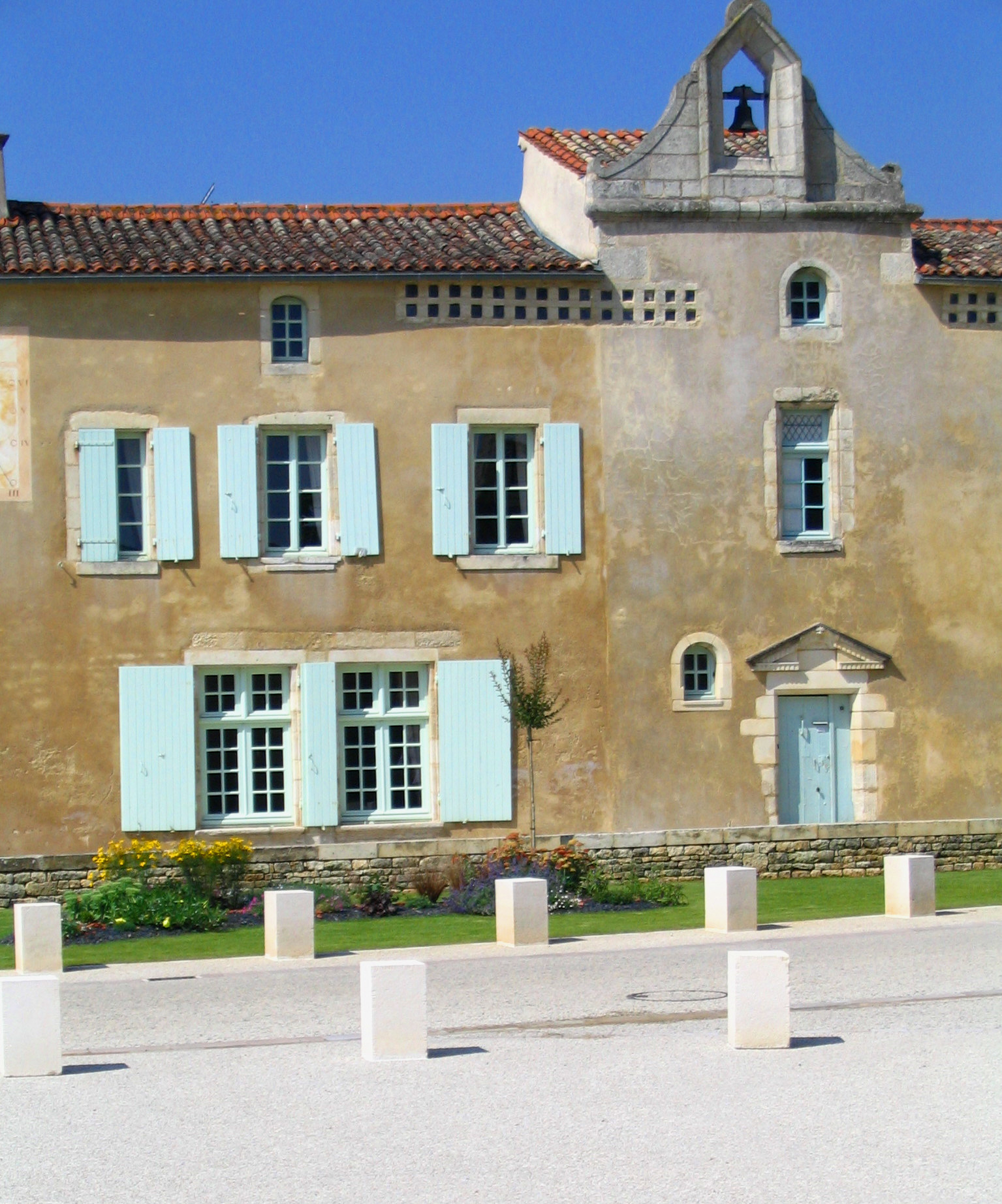
- Houses on the church square of Nieul-sur-l'Autise
- Location of Nieul-sur-l'Autise
- Location within France Location within Pays de la Loire
- Coordinates: 46°25′28″N 0°40′41″W
- Country: France
- Region: Pays de la Loire
- Department: Vendée
- Arrondissement: Fontenay-le-Comte
- Canton: Fontenay-le-Comte
- Commune: Rives-d'Autise
- Area^{1}: 22.63 km^{2} (8.74 sq mi)
- Highest elevation: 58 m (190 ft)
- Lowest elevation: 6 m (20 ft)
- Population (2022): 1,262
  - Density: 55.77/km^{2} (144.4/sq mi)
- Time zone: UTC+01:00 (CET)
  - Summer (DST): UTC+02:00 (CEST)
- Postal code: 85240
- ^{1} French Land Register data, which excludes lakes, ponds, glaciers > 1 km^{2} (0.386 sq mi or 247 acres) and river estuaries.

Nieul-sur-l'Autise is a former commune in the Vendée department in the Pays de la Loire region in western France. On 1 January 2019, it was merged into the new commune Rives-d'Autise.

== See also ==
- Communes of the Vendée department
