= Arrondissements of the Vendée department =

Administrative divisions of Vendée, France

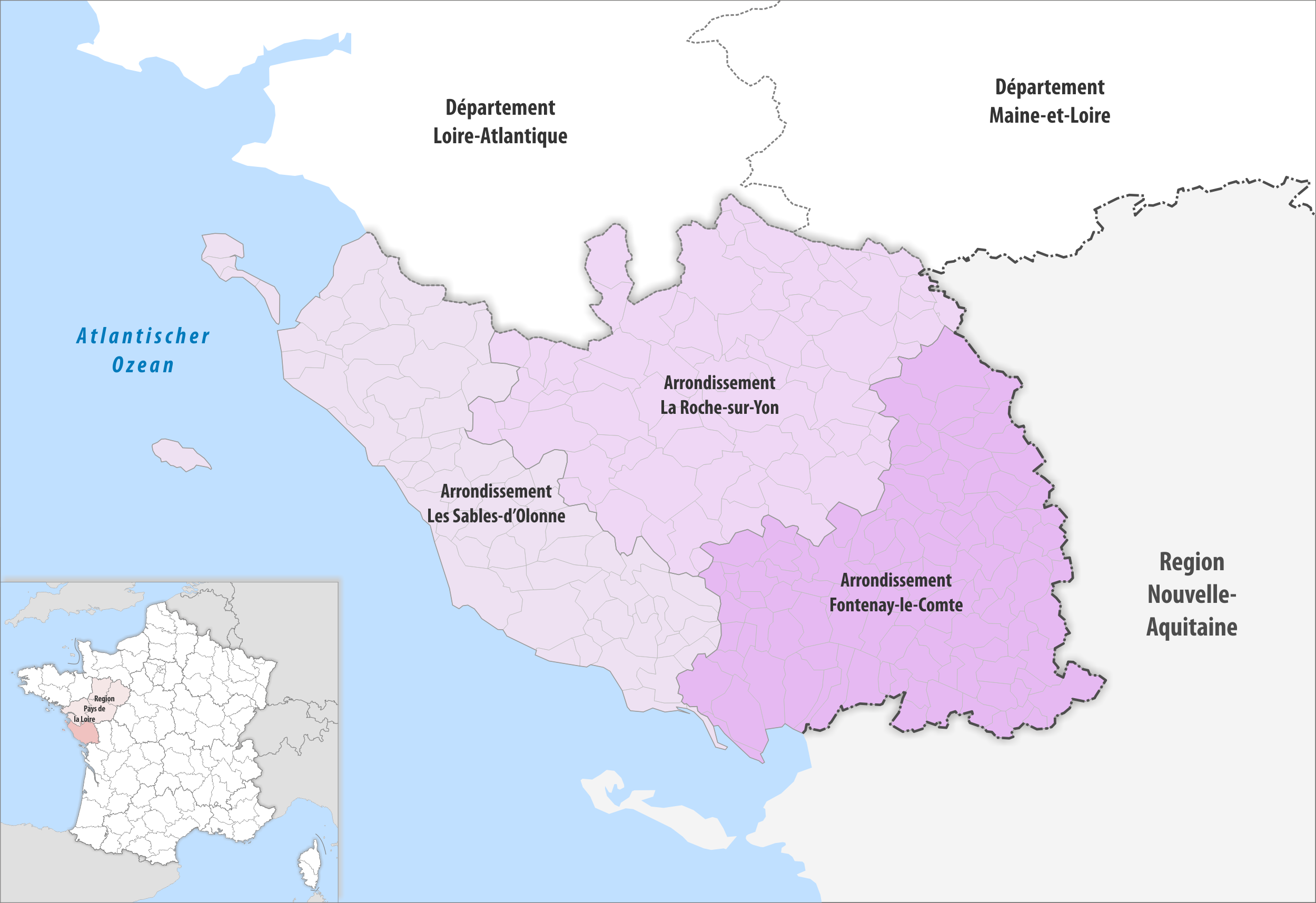
Map of arrondissements of the Vendée department.

The 3 arrondissements of the Vendée department are:

1. Arrondissement of Fontenay-le-Comte, (subprefecture: Fontenay-le-Comte) with 105 communes. The population of the arrondissement was 139,706 in 2021.
2. Arrondissement of La Roche-sur-Yon, (prefecture of the Vendée department: La Roche-sur-Yon) with 77 communes. The population of the arrondissement was 304,663 in 2021.
3. Arrondissement of Les Sables-d'Olonne, (subprefecture: Les Sables-d'Olonne) with 71 communes. The population of the arrondissement was 255,090 in 2021.

== History ==
In 1800 the arrondissements of Fontenay-le-Comte, Montaigu and Les Sables-d'Olonne were established. La Roche-sur-Yon replaced Fontenay-le-Comte as prefecture in 1804. Fontenay-le-Comte replaced Montaigu as subprefecture in 1811.

The borders of the arrondissements of Vendée were modified in January 2017, when 11 communes from the arrondissement of La Roche-sur-Yon were transferred to the arrondissement of Fontenay-le-Comte and eight communes from the arrondissement of Les Sables-d'Olonne moved to the arrondissement of La Roche-sur-Yon.

In January 2019 the commune Landeronde passed from the arrondissement of Les Sables-d'Olonne to the arrondissement of La Roche-sur-Yon.
