= Vendée's 1st constituency =

Constituency of the National Assembly of France

1st constituency of Vendée
- inline Constituency of the National Assembly of France

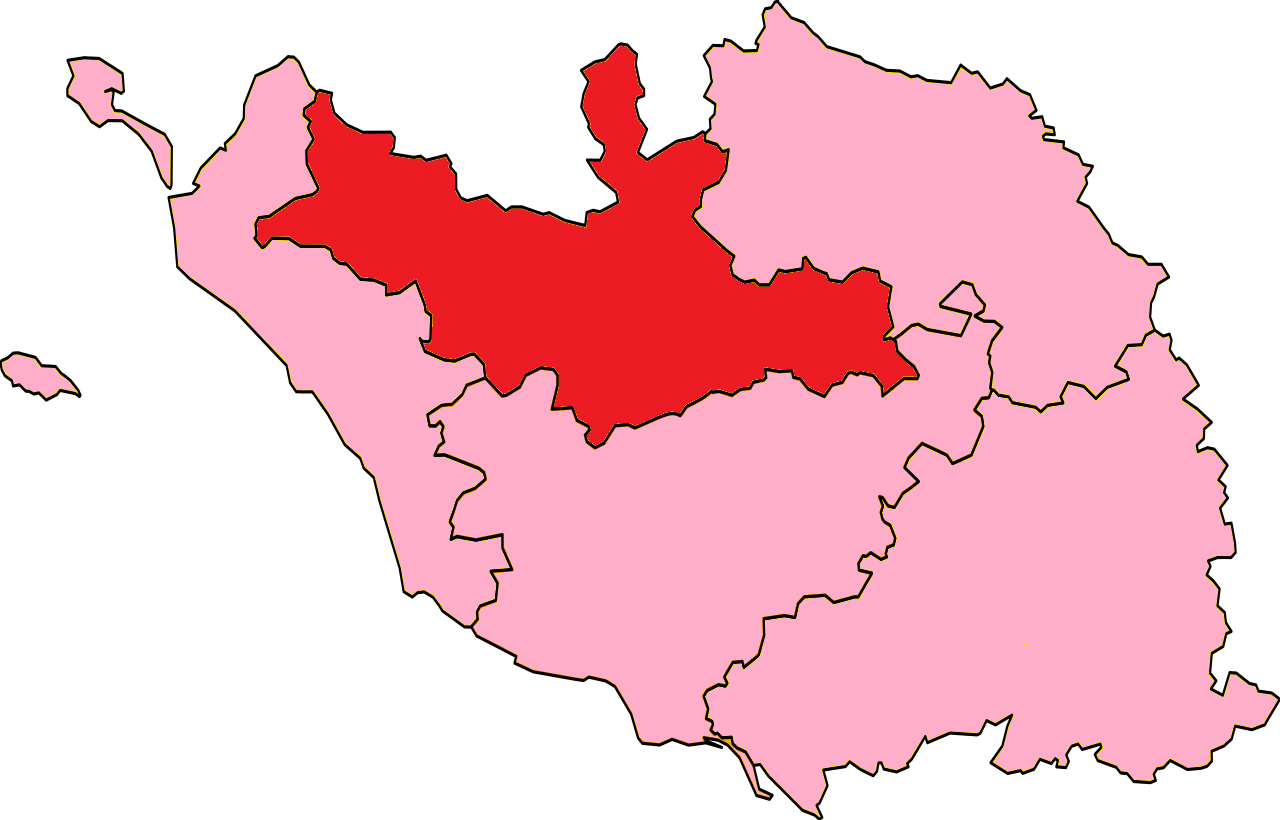
- Vendée's 1st Constituency shown within Vendée
- Deputy: Philippe Latombe; MoDem
- Department: Vendée
- Cantons: Challans, Les Essarts, Palluau, Le Poiré-sur-Vie, Rocheservière, La Roche-sur-Yon Nord
- Registered voters: 109665

The 1st constituency of Vendée (French: Première circonscription de la Vendée) is a French legislative constituency in the Vendéedépartement. Like the other 576 French constituencies, it elects one MP using the two-round system, with a run-off if no candidate receives over 50% of the vote in the first round.

== Description ==
The 1st Constituency of Vendée is situated in the north of the department including the northern section of La Roche-sur-Yon.

Between this seats establishment on its current boundaries in 1988 and the 2017 this seat consistently centre-right candidates. For twenty four years the seat was held by Jean-Luc Préel.

== Deputies ==
Election	Member	Party
1988	Jean-Luc Préel	UDF
1993	Jean-Luc Préel	UDF
1997	Jean-Luc Préel	UDF
2002	Jean-Luc Préel	UDF
2007	Jean-Luc Préel	NC
2012	Alain Lebœuf	UMP
2017	Philippe Latombe	MoDem
2022	Philippe Latombe	MoDem

== Election results ==
=== 2024 ===
Candidate	Party	Alliance	First round		Second round	
Candidate	Party	Alliance	Votes	%	Votes	%
Philippe Latombe	MoDEM	Ensemble	23,136	28.51	48,477	60.90
Simon-Pierre Paulin	LR	UXD	26,105	32.17	31,121	39.10
Lucie Etonno	LE-EELV	NPF	18,929	23.32		
Laurent Caillaud	DVC	DSV	10,607	13.07		
Jean-Marc Barial	DLF	DSV	1,436	1.77		
Gilles Robin	LO		942	1.16		
Valid votes			81,155	96.64	79,598	94.47
Blank votes			1,879	2.24	3,261	3.87
Null votes			943	1.12	3,261	3.87
Turnout			83,977	69.57	84,256	69.77
Abstentions			36,734	30.43	36,503	30.23
Registered voters			120,711		120,759	
Result			MoDEM HOLD			

=== 2022 ===
Legislative Election 2022: Vendée's 1st constituency
Party	Candidate	Votes	%	±%
MoDem (Ensemble)	Philippe Latombe	16,624	30.65	-9.40
EELV (NUPÉS)	Lucie Etonno	13,106	24.16	+5.09
LR (UDC)	Laurent Caillaud	9,191	16.95	−9.60
RN	Lilas N'Dong	8,791	16.21	+7.35
REC	Eric Mauvoisin-Delavaud	1,971	3.63	N/A
DVE	Alain Bouyer	1,210	2.23	N/A
Others	N/A	3,343	6.16	
Turnout		54,236	47.16	−4.25
2nd round result
MoDem (Ensemble)	Philippe Latombe	27,885	56.73	+2.32
EELV (NUPÉS)	Lucie Etonno	21,268	43.27	N/A
Turnout		49,153	45.05	+4.80
MoDem hold				

=== 2017 ===
Legislative Election 2017: Vendée's 1st constituency
Party	Candidate	Votes	%	±%
MoDem	Philippe Latombe	22,581	40.05	
LR	Alain Lebœuf	14,971	26.55	
LFI	Gwenaëlle Grietens	5,246	9.30	
FN	Catherine Roy	4,993	8.86	
PS	Cécile Dreure	3,210	5.69	
EELV	Guy Batiot	2,301	4.08	
Others	N/A	3,080		
Turnout		56,382	51.41	
2nd round result
MoDem	Philippe Latombe	24,017	54.41	
LR	Alain Lebœuf	20,122	45.59	
Turnout		44,139	40.25	
MoDem gain from DVD				

=== 2012 ===
Legislative Election 2012: Vendée's 1st constituency
Party	Candidate	Votes	%	±%
DVD	Alain Lebœuf	23,646	40.19	
PS	Martine Chantecaille	20,807	35.37	
FN	Richard Ducret	5,751	9.77	
FG	Anita Charrieau	2,137	3.63	
EELV	Anne Valin	1,903	3.23	
MoDem	Joseph Nicoleau	1,736	2.95	
Others	N/A	2,854		
Turnout		58,834	57.58	
2nd round result
DVD	Alain Lebœuf	30,005	53.19	
PS	Martine Chantecaille	26,402	46.81	
Turnout		56,407	55.21	
DVD gain from NM				

=== 2007 ===
Legislative Election 2007: Vendée's 1st constituency
Party	Candidate	Votes	%	±%
NM	Jean-Luc Préel	17,761	31.03	
DVD	Alain Lebœuf*	15,992	27.94	
PS	Patricia Cereijo	14,460	25.26	
LV	Anne Valin	2,041	3.57	
Far left	Mayi Gil	1,491	2.60	
FN	Brigitte Neveux	1,293	2.26	
CPNT	Nathalie Botton	1,232	2.15	
Others	N/A	2,974		
Turnout		58,937	61.80	
2nd round result
NM	Jean-Luc Préel	29,055	56.89	
PS	Patricia Cereijo	22,014	43.11	
Turnout		51,069	55.64	
NM gain from UDF				

* Withdrew before the 2nd round

=== 2002 ===
Legislative Election 2002: Vendée's 1st constituency
Party	Candidate	Votes	%	±%
UDF	Jean-Luc Préel	28,154	51.46	
PS	Patricia Cereijo	13,543	24.76	
FN	Yseult Desmier	3,049	5.57	
CPNT	Michel Deriez	2,975	5.44	
LV	Annick Tarot	2,754	5.03	
LO	Gilles Robin	1,272	2.33	
Others	N/A	2,961		
Turnout		56,282	64.81	
UDF hold				

=== 1997 ===
Legislative Election 1997: Vendée's 1st constituency
Party	Candidate	Votes	%	±%
UDF	Jean-Luc Préel	22,693	43.99	
PS	Gilles Bourmaud	15,153	29.37	
FN	Jack-Olivier Brayet	4,664	9.04	
GE	Jean-François Martineau	3,210	6.22	
DVD	Juliette Gilles	2,881	5.58	
PCF	Bertrand Lavigne	2,496	4.84	
DIV	Jean-François Monnet	490	0.95	
Turnout		56,482	70.94	
2nd round result
UDF	Jean-Luc Préel	30,049	57.12	
PS	Gilles Bourmaud	22,557	42.88	
Turnout		56,373	70.81	
UDF hold				
