= Jean-Paul Ribreau =

French footballer (born 1957)

Personal information
- Full name: Jean-Paul Ribreau
- Date of birth: December 1, 1957 (age 68)
- Place of birth: Benet, France
- Height: 1.75 m (5 ft 9 in)
- Position: Defender

Senior career*
Years	Team	Apps	(Gls)
1984–1989	Chamois Niortais	55	(1)
- * Club domestic league appearances and goals

Jean-Paul Ribreau (born December 1, 1957) is a former professional footballer who played as a defender.
