= Stéphane Buchou =

French politician (born 1974)

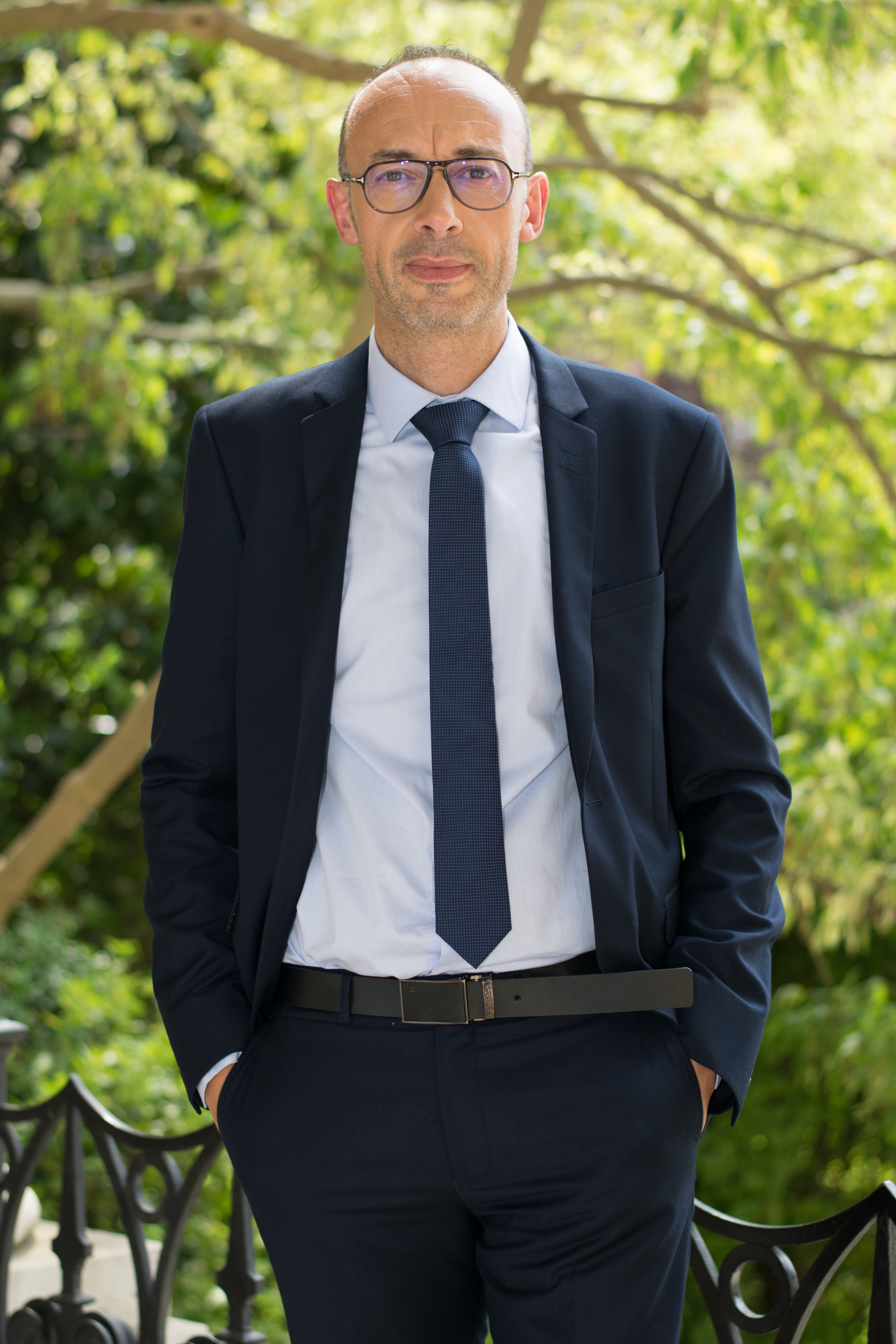

Member of the National Assembly for Vendée's 3rd constituency
- Incumbent
- Assumed office 21 June 2017
- Preceded by: Yannick Moreau

Personal details
- Born: 14 March 1974 (age 52) Strasbourg, France
- Party: Renaissance
- Education: University of Nantes

Stéphane Buchou (French pronunciation: [stefan byʃu]; born 14 March 1974) is a French politician who has been serving as a member of the National Assembly since the 2017 election, representing the department of Vendée. He is a member of Renaissance (RE).

== Political career ==
In parliament, Buchou serves as a member of the Committee on Sustainable Development and Spatial Planning. In addition, he is part of the French-Russian Parliamentary Friendship Group and the French delegation to the Inter-Parliamentary Union (IPU). In 2020, Buchou joined En commun (EC), a group within LREM led by Barbara Pompili.

== Political positions ==
In May 2018, Buchou co-sponsored an initiative in favour of a bioethics law extending to homosexual and single women free access to fertility treatments such as in vitro fertilisation (IVF) under France's national health insurance; it was one of the campaign promises of President Emmanuel Macron and marked the first major social reform of his five-year term.

In July 2019, Buchou decided not to align with his parliamentary group's majority and became one of 52 LREM members who abstained from a vote on the French ratification of the European Union’s Comprehensive Economic and Trade Agreement (CETA) with Canada.

== See also ==
- 2017 French legislative election
