= Préfou =

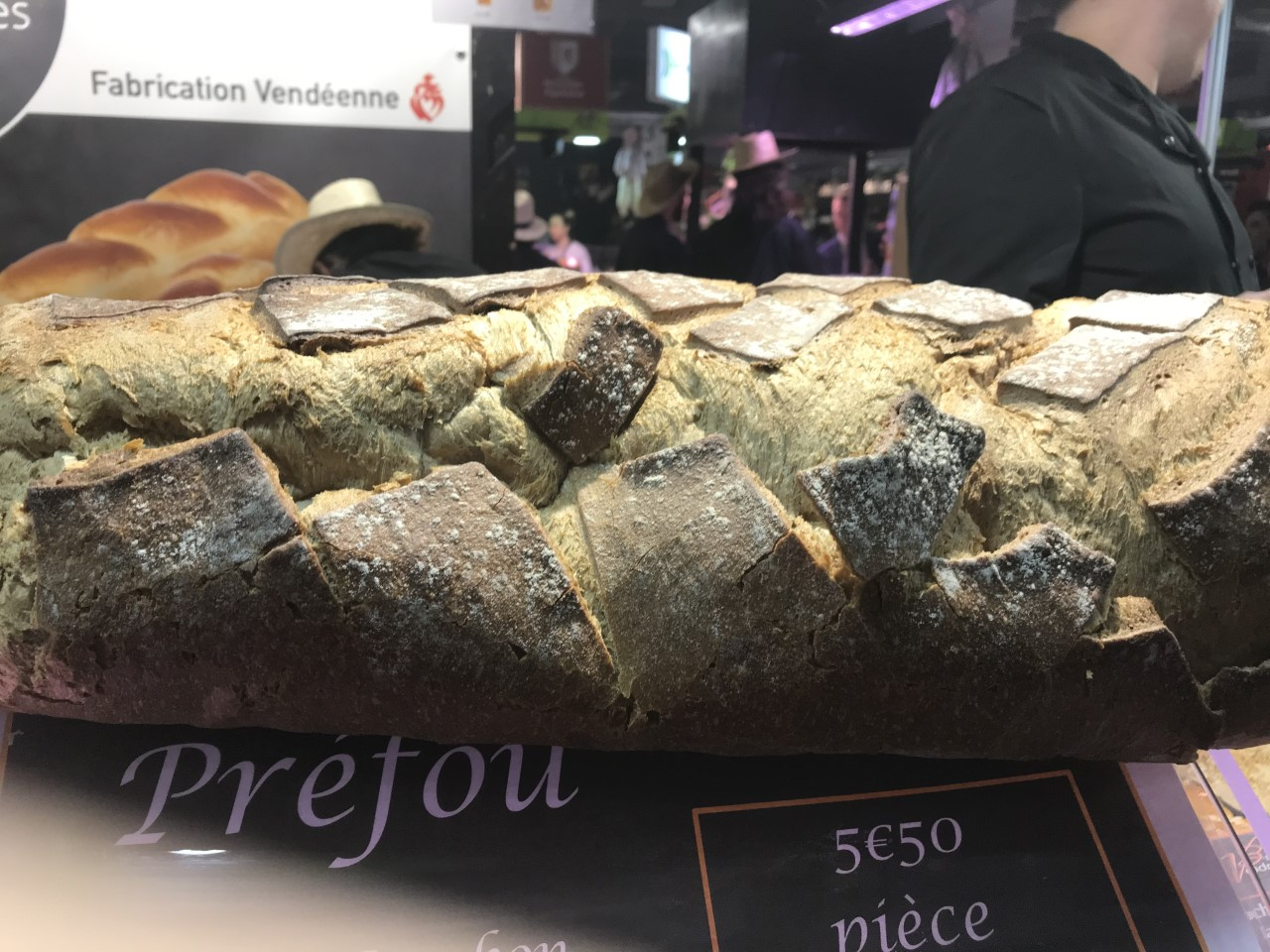
- Préfou
- Course: Hors d'oeuvre
- Place of origin: France
- Region or state: Vendée
- Serving temperature: Warm
- Main ingredients: Bread, garlic, butter

The préfou is a regional culinary specialty from Vendée, in France. The préfou is made with bread garnished with chopped fresh garlic and butter. It is generally served warm, as an appetizer.

The dish was originally known as "prefour", as it was developed from dough used to test the temperature of wood-fired ovens (fours, in French). A small ball of dough was placed in the oven until cooked, showing that the required temperature had been reached. Rather than throwing the test bread away, bakers would eat it after rubbing with garlic and butter.
