= Philippe Latombe =

French politician (born 1975)

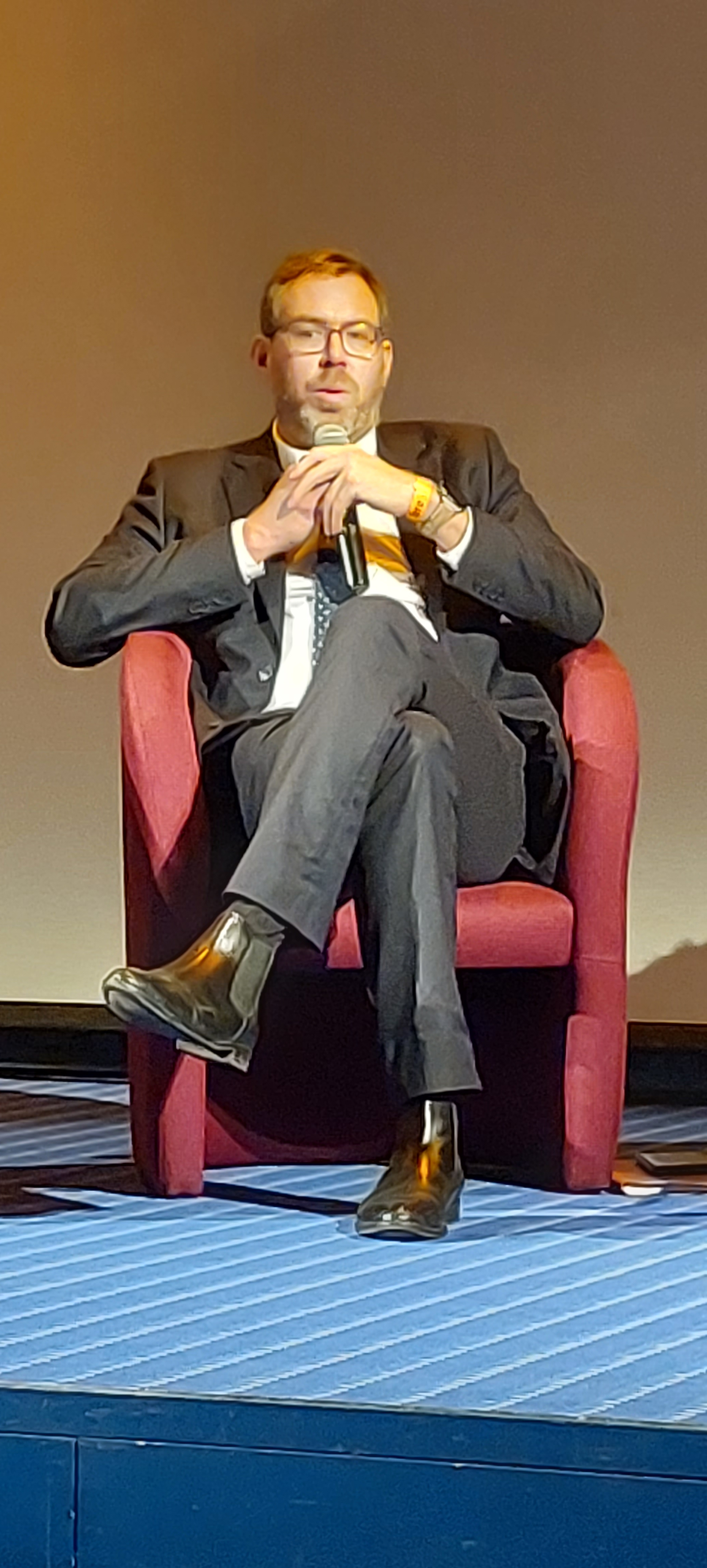

Member of the National Assembly for Vendée's 1st constituency
- Incumbent
- Assumed office 21 June 2017
- Preceded by: Alain Lebœuf

Personal details
- Born: Philippe Alcibiade; Marie-Joseph Latombe; 21 April 1975 (age 51) 14th arrondissement of Paris, France
- Party: Democratic Movement (2017–present)
- Education: University of Rennes 1 University of Nantes

Philippe Alcibiade Marie-Joseph Latombe (born 21 April 1975) is a French politician of the Democratic Movement (MoDem) who has represented the 1st constituency of the Vendée department in the National Assembly since 2017.

== Biography ==
Latombe, who had a private career with Deloitte and Crédit Agricole, was a union delegate for the French Confederation of Management – General Confederation of Executives (CFE-CGC).

He spent his time between Nantes, Loire-Atlantique and La Roche-sur-Yon, Vendée while professionally active in the private sector, because of a shared custody agreement for his two daughters.

== Political career ==
In the 1995 presidential election, Latombe campaigned for Jacques Chirac.

He ran for a seat in the municipal council of Nantes in 2014 on the miscellaneous right list led by Sophie Van Goethem which failed to make the second round with 5.6% of the first-round vote. In the 2015 departmental election, he ran for a seat in the Departmental Council of Loire-Atlantique in the canton of Nantes-4, when he received 5.1% of the first-round vote. In the 2015 regional election in Pays de la Loire, he was placed twelfth on the Loire-Atlantique list led by Van Goethem for Debout la France.

Latombe joined the Democratic Movement in 2017. He successfully ran for the National Assembly in the 1st constituency of Vendée in the 2017 legislative election with the support of La République En Marche! of President Emmanuel Macron. He won reelection to a second term in 2022.

In Parliament, Latombe has served on the Committee on Legal Affairs. Since 2022, he has also co-chaired a fact-finding mission on video surveillance in public spaces.

In addition to his committee assignments, Latombe chairs the French-Mongolian Parliamentary Friendship Group. He is part of the French-British Parliamentary Friendship Group, the French-Canadian Parliamentary Friendship Group, the French-Israeli Parliamentary Friendship Group and the French-Russian Parliamentary Friendship Group.
