= Louis Guédon =

French politician (born 1935)

Louis Guédon (French pronunciation: [lwi ɡedɔ̃]; born 28 November 1935 in Les Sables-d'Olonne) was a member of the National Assembly of France. He represented the Vendée department, between 1993 and 2012. and is a member of the Union for a Popular Movement.
