= Béatrice Bellamy =

French politician (1966–2026)

Member of the National Assembly for Vendée's 2nd constituency
- In office 21 June 2022 – 24 May 2026
- Preceded by: Patrick Loiseau
- Succeeded by: Dominique Paillat

Personal details
- Born: Beatrice Bichon; 20 October 1966 Nantes, France
- Died: 24 May 2026 (aged 59) La Roche-sur-Yon, France
- Party: Horizons

Béatrice Bellamy (née Bichon; 20 October 1966 – 24 May 2026) was a French politician from Horizons (Ensemble). She served as a member of the National Assembly for Vendée's 2nd constituency from 2022 until her death in 2026. Bellamy died from cancer on 24 May 2026, at the age of 59.

== See also ==
- List of deputies of the 16th National Assembly of France
