= Vendée =

Department of France

- Department of France
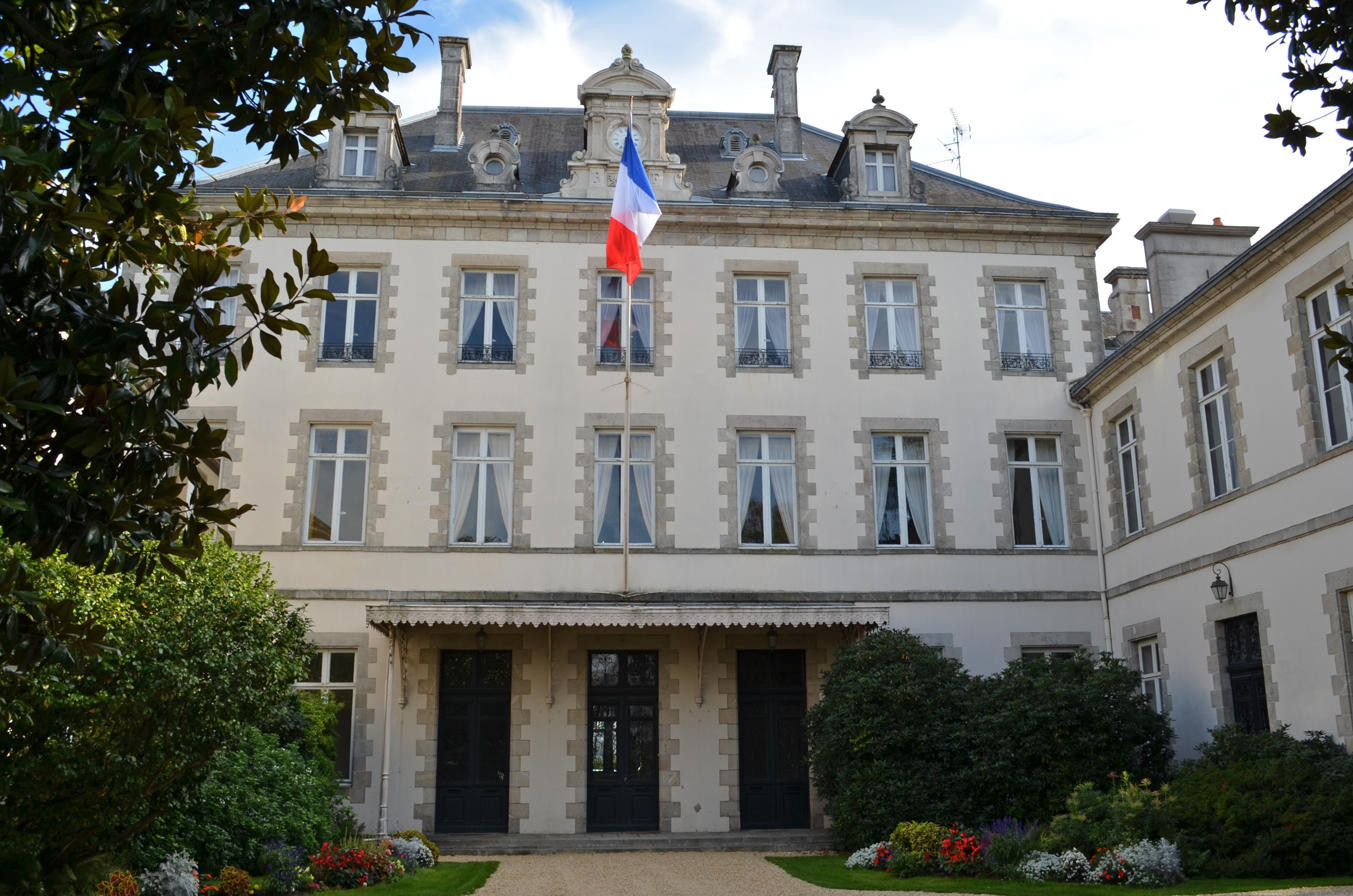
- Prefecture building in La Roche-sur-Yon

- Flag Coat of arms

- Location of Vendée in France
- Coordinates: 46°40′14″N 1°25′36″W
- Country: France
- Region: Pays de la Loire
- Prefecture: La Roche-sur-Yon
- Subprefectures: Fontenay-le-Comte; Les Sables-d'Olonne

Government
  - President of the Departmental Council: Alain Lebœuf

Area^{1}
  - Total: 6,720 km^{2} (2,590 sq mi)

Population (2023)
  - Total: 713,609
  - Rank: 35th
  - Density: 106/km^{2} (275/sq mi)
- Time zone: UTC+1 (CET)
  - Summer (DST): UTC+2 (CEST)
- Department number: 85
- Arrondissements: 3
- Cantons: 17
- Communes: 253
- ^1 French Land Register data, which exclude estuaries and lakes, ponds and glaciers larger than 1 km^{2}

Vendée (French pronunciation: [vɑ̃de]) is a department in the Pays de la Loire region in Western France, on the Atlantic coast. In 2023, it had a population of 713,609. Its prefecture is La Roche-sur-Yon.

== History ==
The area today called the Vendée was originally known as the Bas-Poitou and is part of the former province of Poitou.

In the southeast corner, the village of Nieul-sur-l'Autise is believed to be the birthplace of Eleanor of Aquitaine (1122–1204). Eleanor's son, Richard the Lionheart often had his base in Talmont. The Hundred Years' War (1337–1453) turned much of the Vendée into a battleground.

Since the Vendée held a considerable number of influential Protestants, including control by Jeanne d'Albret mother of Henry IV of France, the region was greatly affected by the French Wars of Religion which broke out in 1562 and continued until 1598. In April of that year King Henri IV issued the Edict of Nantes and the Wars came to an end. The revocation of the Edict of Nantes in 1685 caused many Huguenots to flee from the Vendée. In the void, the region became rigorously Catholic due to the influence of preacher and Marian missionary Louis de Montfort who radically changed the spirituality of the region. Many attribute the effect of his preaching to prepare the Vendeans for their revolt against the French Revolution.

The Vendeans revolted against the Revolutionary government in 1793. They resented the harsh oppression imposed on the Catholic Church by the provisions of the 1790 Civil Constitution of the Clergy and broke into open revolt after the Revolutionary government's imposition of military conscription. A massacre of Republicans at Machecoul in March was followed by guerrilla warfare, led at the outset by peasants who were chosen in each locale, and cost more than 240,000 lives before it ended in 1796 (190,000 Vendeans who were republicans or royalists and 50,000 non-Vendean republican soldiers; according to the Jacques Hussenet and Centre Vendéen de Recherche Historique's book Détruisez la Vendée).

The Revolt in the Vendée must not be confused with the revolt of the Chouans, which took place at the same time in Maine and Brittany. The revolt was led by a mixture of aristocrats and commoners. Britain provided funds and weapons but various plans for military support were thwarted or cancelled, such as the ill-fated 1795 Quiberon Expedition. In 1804, Napoleon chose La Roche-sur-Yon to be the capital of the department. At the time, most of La Roche had been eradicated in the Vendée Revolt (1793–96); the renamed Napoléonville was laid out and a fresh population of soldiers and civil servants was brought in. Napoléonville had a square-grid street network and was designed to accommodate 15,000 people.

In 1815, when Napoleon escaped exile on Elba for his Hundred Days, the Vendée refused to recognise him and stayed loyal to King Louis XVIII. General Lamarque led 10,000 men into the Vendée to pacify the region. A failed rebellion in the Vendée in 1832 in support of Marie-Caroline de Bourbon-Sicile, duchess de Berry, the former King Charles X's widowed daughter-in-law, was an unsuccessful attempt to restore the Legitimist Bourbon dynasty during the reign of the Orléanist monarch, King Louis Philippe of the French (1830–1848).

In 1850, the English author Anthony Trollope published his book La Vendée, detailing the history of the region and the war. In the preface he pays tribute to Madame de la Rochejaquelein, on whose memoirs of the war he based his story.

== Etymology ==
The name Vendée is taken from the river Vendée which runs through the southeastern part of the department. The river is attested as Fluvium Vendre in the 10th century, and as Flumen Vendee and Vendeia by the 11th century. According to Pierre-Henri Billy, the name ultimately derives from the Celtic toponym *vindo- meaning white or brilliant in a sacred context (as in the Modern Welsh gwyn/wyn). The name likely originates in Proto-Celtic or Gaulish, but may also have originated in the Gallo or Old Breton languages.

== Geography ==
Map of the department

Vendée's highest point is Puy-Crapaud (295 m).

The department is crossed by four rivers: the Sèvre Nantaise (135 kilometres (84 mi) long), the Vendée (70 kilometres (43 mi)), the Lay (110 kilometres (68 mi)) and the Sèvre Niortaise (150 kilometres (93 mi)).

== Demographics ==
Vendée's inhabitants are referred to as Vendeans (French Vendéens pronounced [vɑ̃.de.ɛ̃]).

Historical population

| Year | Pop. | ±% p.a. |
|---|---|---|
| 1801 | 243,426 | — |
| 1821 | 316,587 | +1.32% |
| 1831 | 330,350 | +0.43% |
| 1841 | 356,453 | +0.76% |
| 1851 | 383,734 | +0.74% |
| 1861 | 395,695 | +0.31% |
| 1872 | 401,446 | +0.13% |
| 1881 | 421,642 | +0.55% |
| 1891 | 442,355 | +0.48% |
| 1901 | 441,311 | −0.02% |
| 1911 | 438,520 | −0.06% |
| 1921 | 397,292 | −0.98% |
| 1931 | 390,396 | −0.17% |

| Year | Pop. | ±% p.a. |
|---|---|---|
| 1936 | 389,211 | −0.06% |
| 1946 | 393,787 | +0.12% |
| 1954 | 395,641 | +0.06% |
| 1962 | 408,928 | +0.41% |
| 1968 | 421,250 | +0.50% |
| 1975 | 450,641 | +0.97% |
| 1982 | 483,027 | +1.00% |
| 1990 | 509,356 | +0.67% |
| 1999 | 539,664 | +0.64% |
| 2007 | 607,430 | +1.49% |
| 2012 | 648,901 | +1.33% |
| 2017 | 675,247 | +0.80% |
| 2023 | 713,609 | +0.93% |

=== Principal towns ===
The most populous commune is La Roche-sur-Yon, the prefecture. As of 2023, there are 8 communes with more than 10,000 inhabitants:

| Commune | Population (2019) |
|---|---|
| La Roche-sur-Yon | 54,849 |
| Les Sables-d'Olonne | 49,603 |
| Challans | 22,943 |
| Montaigu-Vendée | 21,134 |
| Les Herbiers | 16,521 |
| Fontenay-le-Comte | 14,059 |
| Saint-Hilaire-de-Riez | 13,074 |
| Aizenay | 10,365 |

== Higher education ==
The main University of this department is the Catholic Institute of Higher Studies - ICES in La Roche-sur-Yon. The main goal of this institute is to achieve academic excellence through an enhancement of the Christian and human dimension in seven areas of study. Founded in 1989, Catholic Institute of Higher Studies - ICES has pioneered a new concept in higher education, that of the "University School": halfway between the French Grande École and the traditional state university.

== Economy ==
The primary factors of the Vendéen economy are:

- Tourism
- Agriculture
- Food Processing
- Light/Medium Industry

The Vendée has been cited as the most economically dynamic department in France by L'Express magazine in a 2006 survey. Its economy is characterised by a low rate of unemployment (around 7% in late 2006 compared to more than 9% nationally) and a very high proportion of small and medium-sized businesses (one business for every 14 inhabitants).

=== Tourism ===
The coast of the Vendée extends over 200 kilometres (120 mi) of mostly sandy beaches. Tourists from overseas and locally frequent them. Some resorts include Les Sables-d'Olonne, La Tranche-sur-Mer and Saint-Jean-de-Monts. Some beaches are certified for the FEE Blue Flag for cleanliness.

With more than 160 kilometres (100 mi) of sandy beaches edged with dunes and pine woods. There are several nude beaches including just south of La Faute sur Mer on the Pointe d'Arçay. The department also has churches and abbeys, museums, and—for nature lovers—thousands of marked footpaths, a signposted bicycle route running along the coastal mudflats, and marshes that attract unusual birds. There is fishing in the Vendée's rivers and lakes.

Inland, the chief attractions include the Marais Poitevin (an area of marshlands famed for wildlife), the forested area around the village of Mervent and the rolling countryside of the Bocage. In the north of the department, the historical theme park Puy du Fou attracts more than 1.45 million of visitors per year.

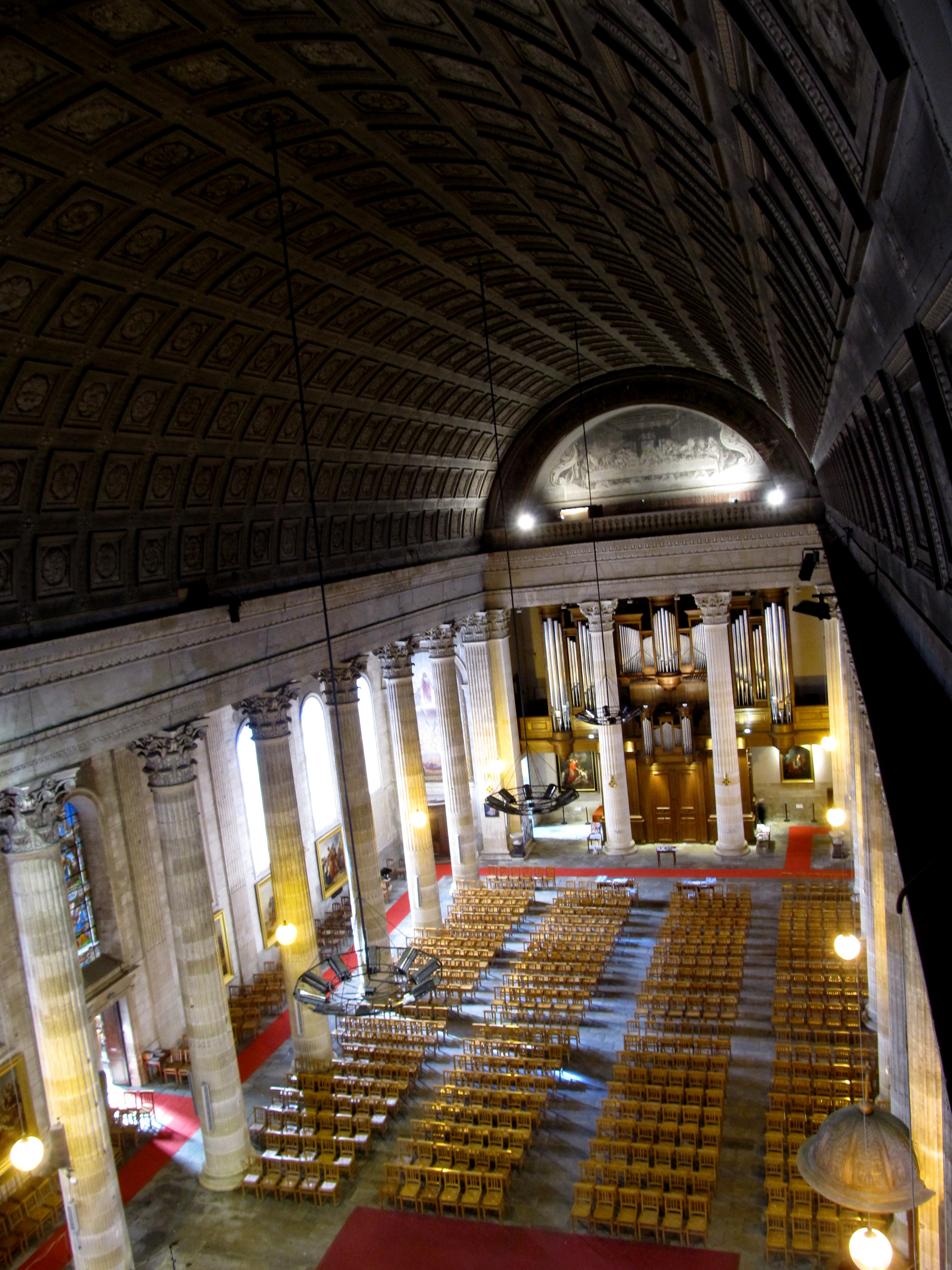
Saint Louis Church of La Roche-sur-Yon

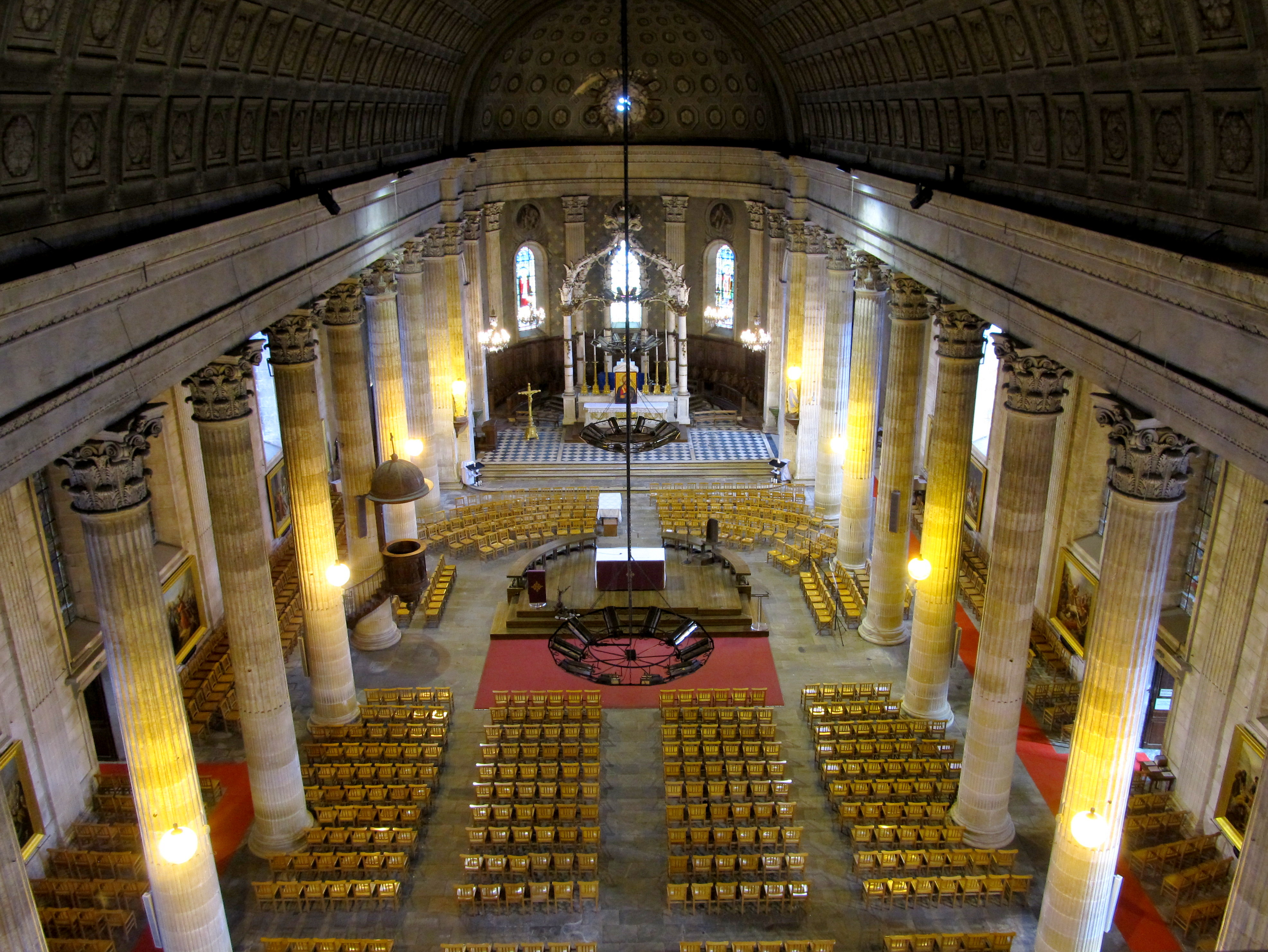
Saint Louis Church of La Roche-sur-Yon

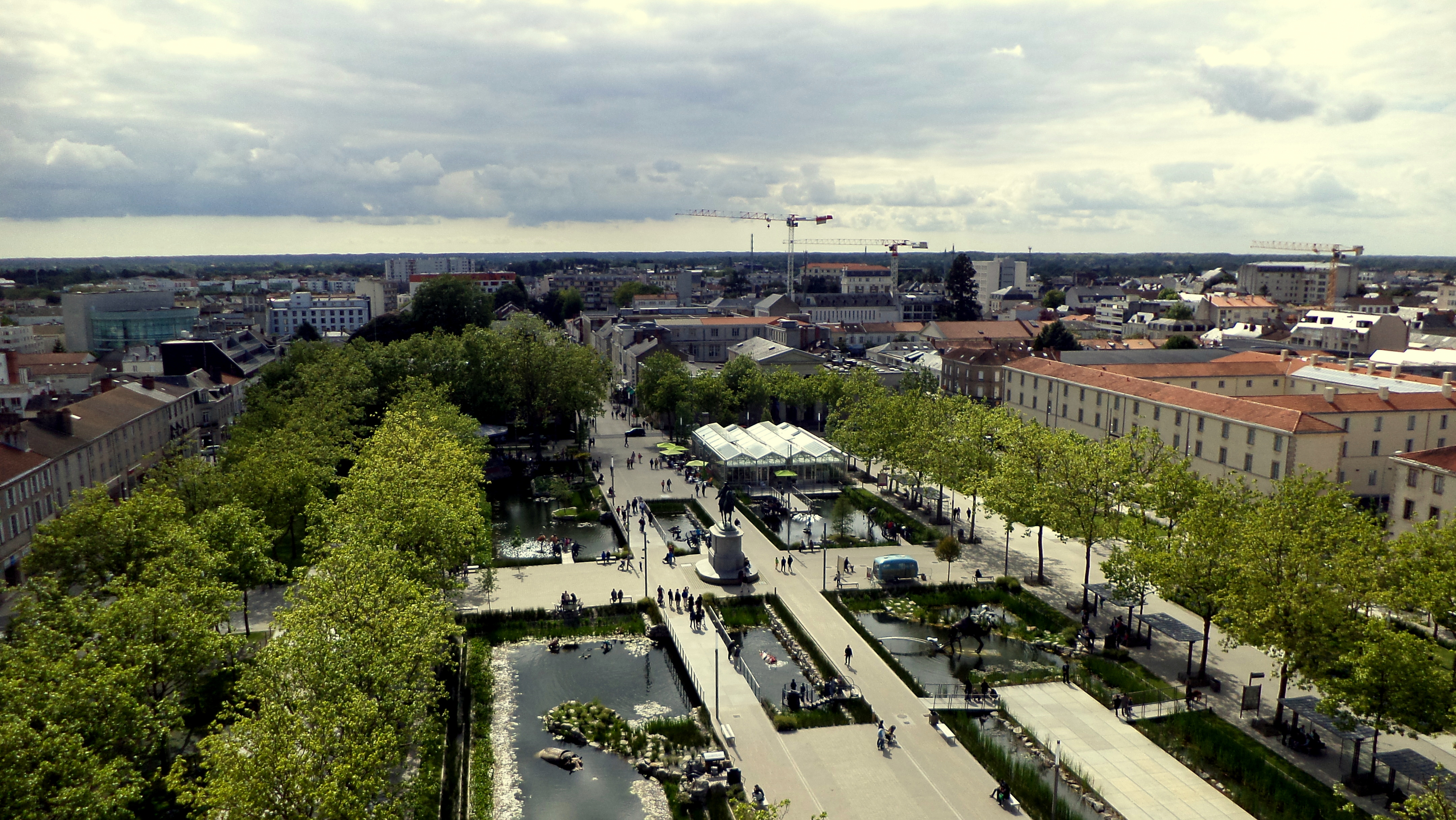
La Roche-sur-Yon, Napoleon I's city

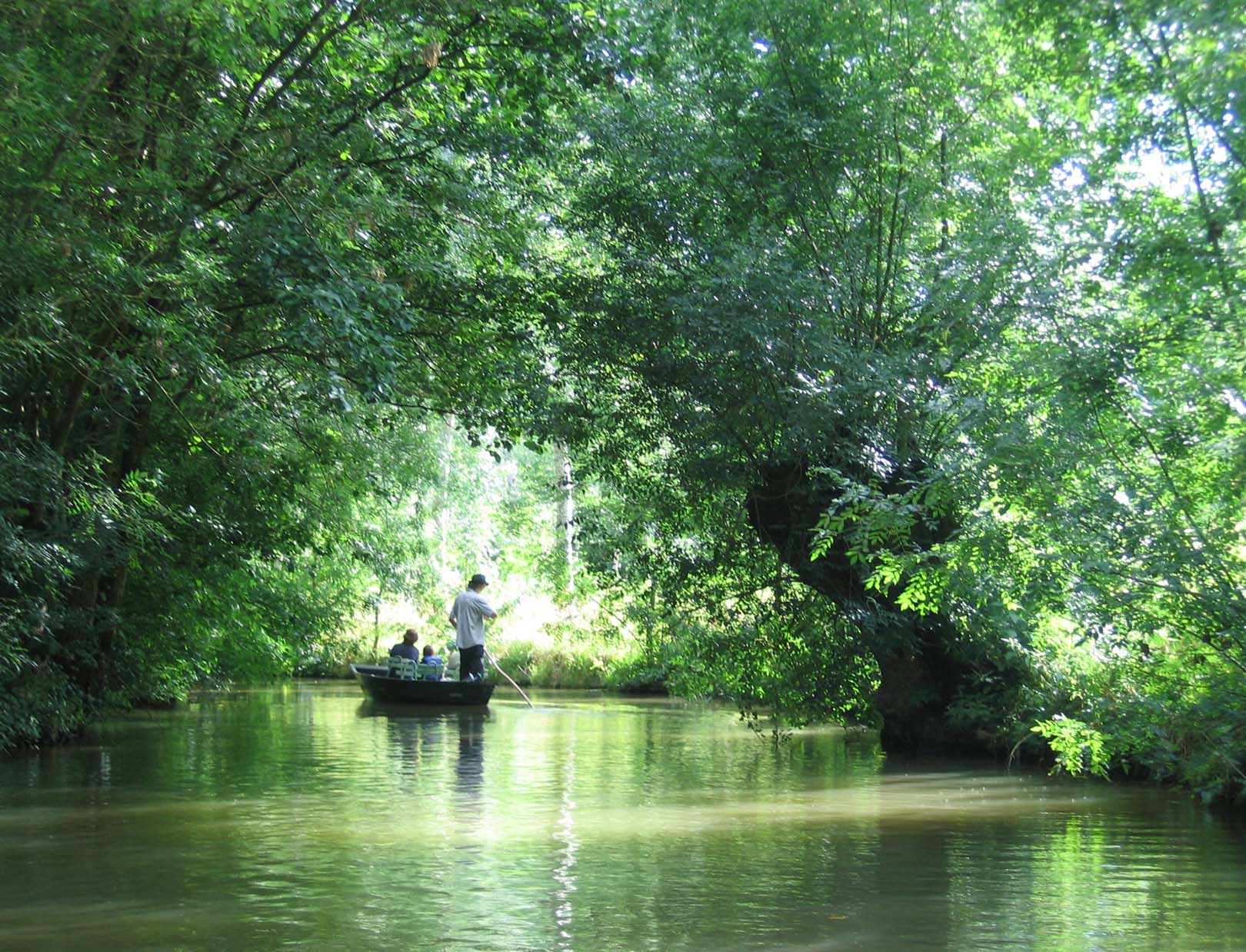
Marais Poitevin

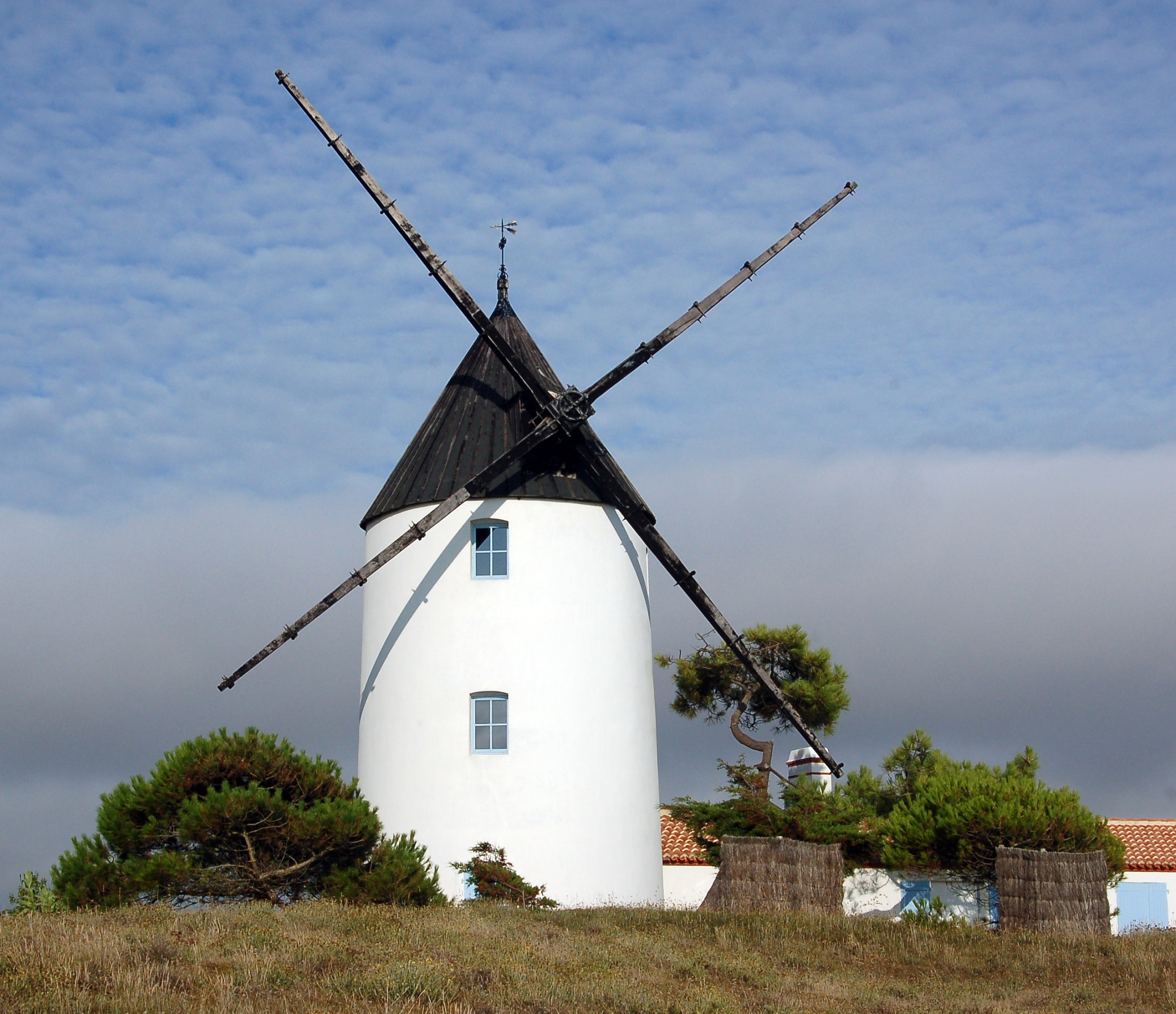
Windmill on the Noirmoutier island

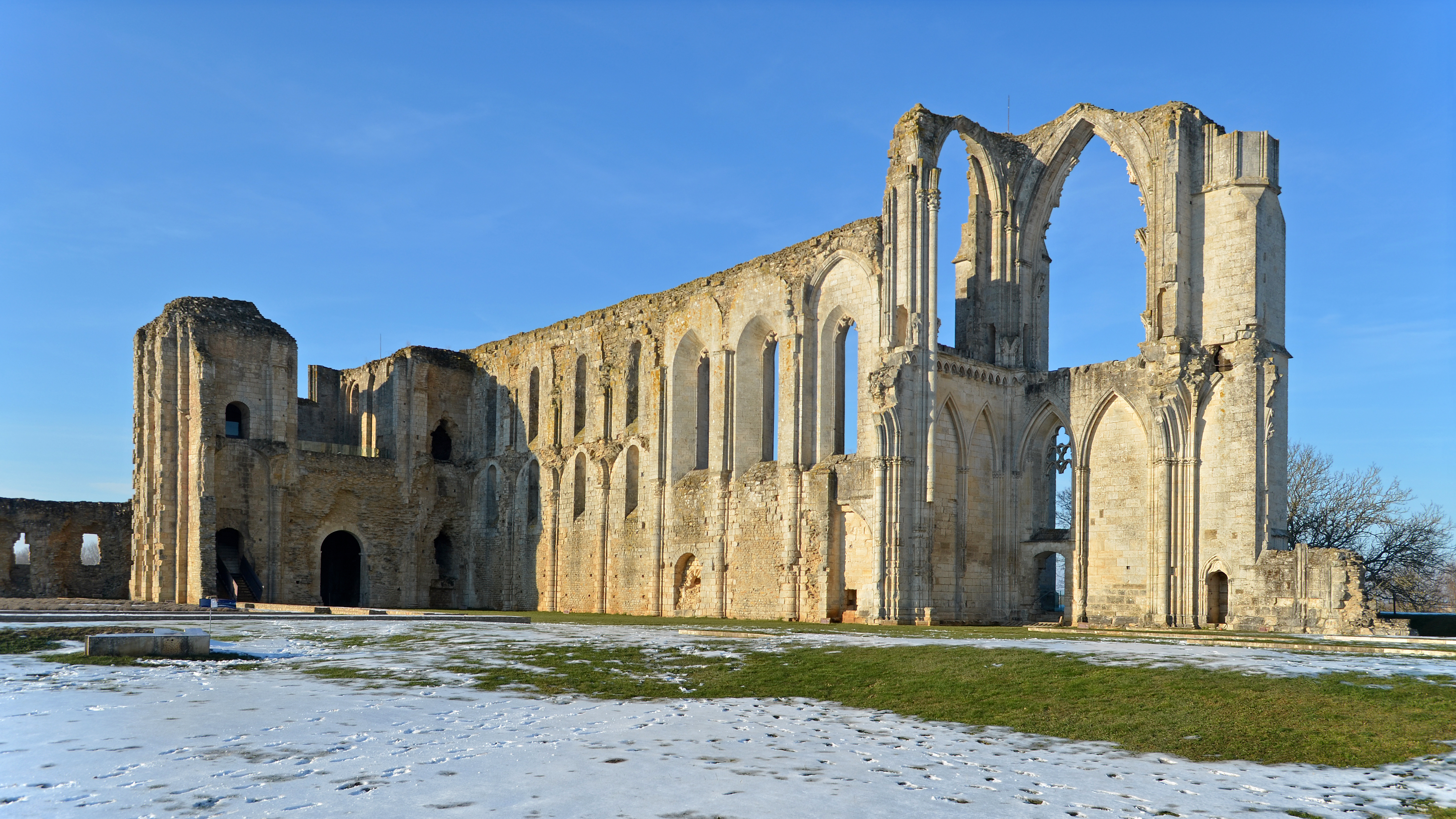
Maillezais Cathedral

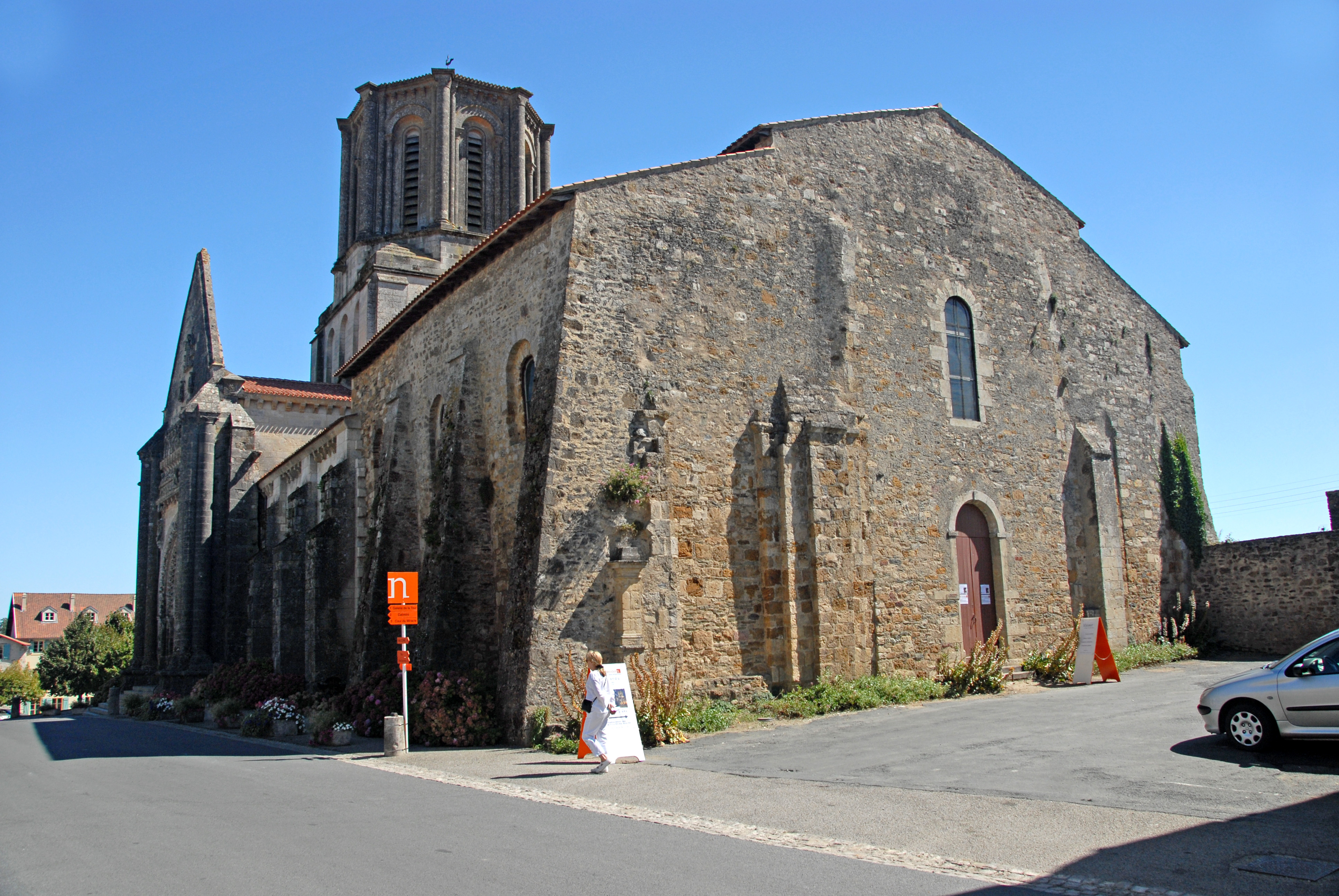
Vouvant

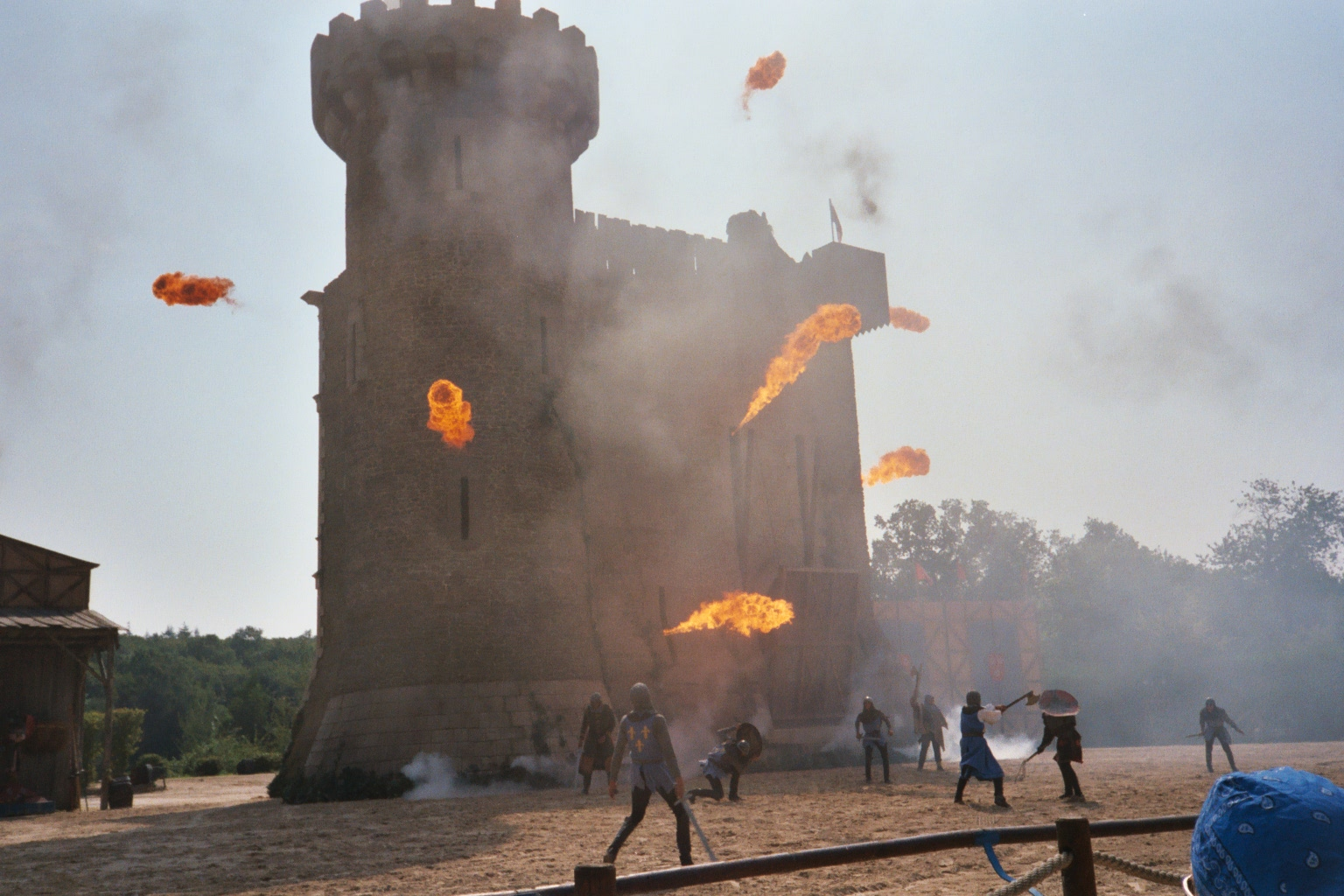
Medieval show at Puy du Fou themepark.

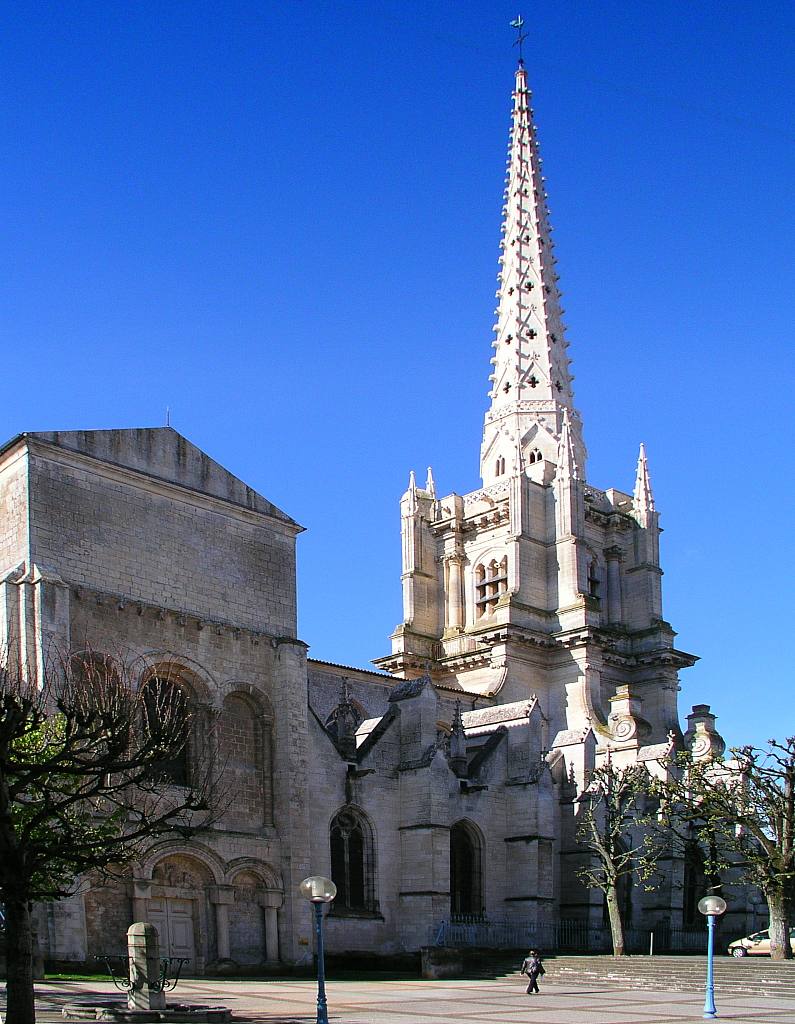
Cathedral of Notre Dame, episcopal seat of the Diocese of Luçon (comprising the Vendée)

=== Agriculture ===
Agriculture remains a significant source of employment in the Vendée. Among departments, it has the second highest level of revenue from agriculture in France. The major arable crops grown are maize, colza, wheat and sunflowers. Meat and dairy production also feature, as does the offshore farming of shellfish (oysters and mussels). Poultry from Challans is highly regarded nationwide as is lamb produced from the salt marshes in the North of the Vendée.

Demonstrating its support for the agricultural sector, the Conseil Général of the Vendée has a stated policy to promote the construction of irrigation reservoirs to reduce dependence on ground water during key summer growing seasons.

=== Food processing and manufacturing ===
The Vendée is home to a number of food processing firms. A manufacturer of ready-meals and charcuterie employs the majority of its workforce (some 3000 people) at local plants. Other employers include bakeries and biscuit producers.

The department also has some speciality products, including brioche (Label Rouge) and a raw cured ham (Jambon de Vendée) similar in flavour to bacon.

Wine is also produced in the area around the communes of Vix, Brem, Pissotte and Mareuil-sur-Lay, and is marketed under the "Fiefs Vendéens" designation. Production quality has improved markedly over recent years, and, having already achieved the classification Vin Délimité de Qualité Supérieure (VDQS), the wines are on their way towards A.O.C status (Appellation d'Origine Contrôlée).

=== Industry ===
Much of the manufacturing industry in the Vendée reflects its status as a major tourist destination. Mobile homes are manufactured at plants in Luçon and the building of motor and sail yachts takes place at locations all over the department. The service sector too is strongly inclined towards tourism with campsites, restaurants and other tourism businesses being important sources of revenue and employment.

== Culture ==
The War in the Vendée is the subject of Ninety-Three (Quatrevingt-treize), the last novel by the French writer Victor Hugo, an episode in Mr. Midshipman Hornblower and also the backdrop of Les Chouans by Balzac.

In the writings of Karl Marx regarding revolutionary struggles in various countries, he uses the term "a Vendée" as meaning "a focus of persistent counter-revolutionary activities". Vladimir Lenin, when speaking about Cossacks as potential counter-revolutionary opposition, identified them as Russian Vendée.

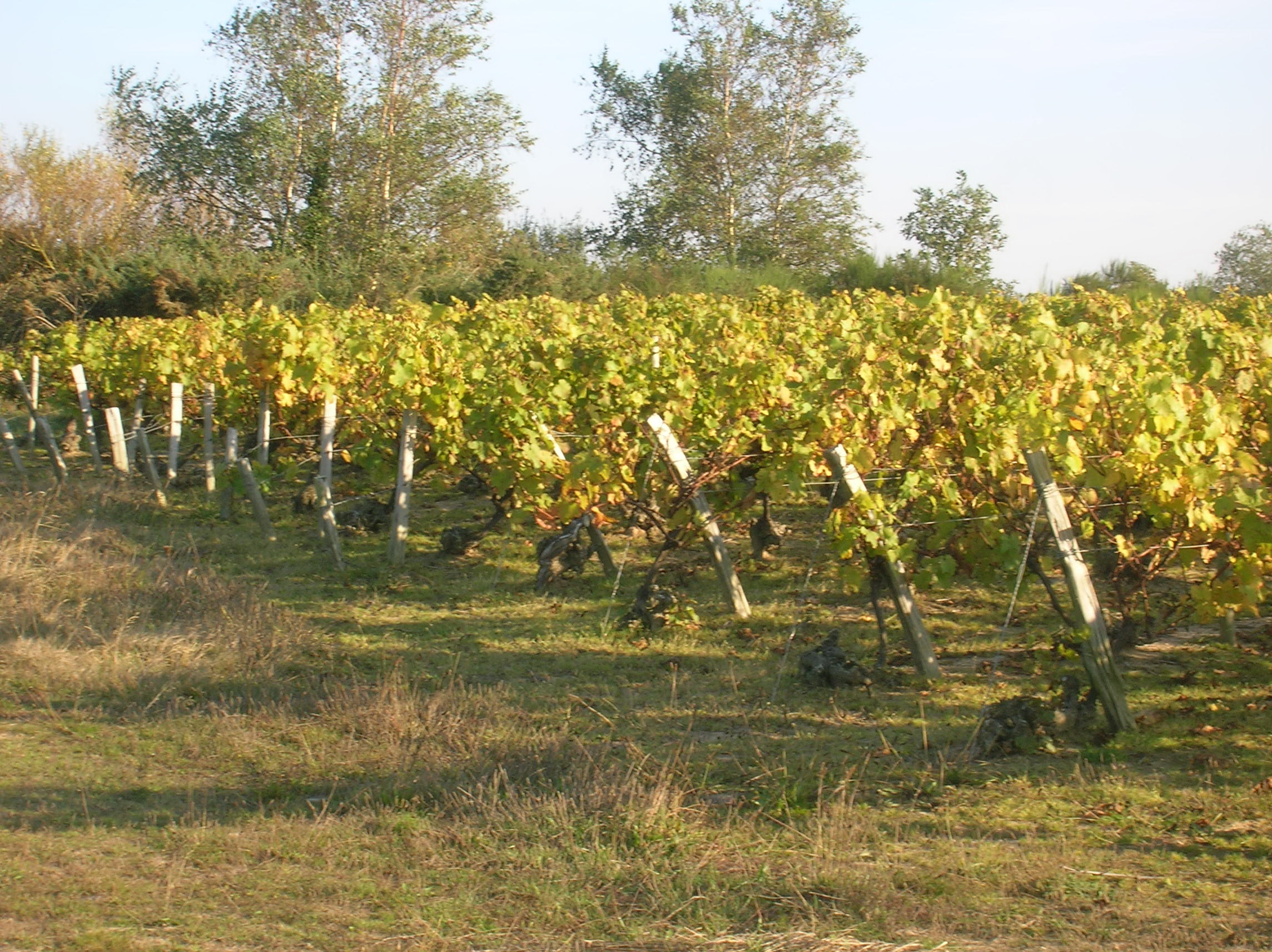
A vine in Brem-sur-Mer.

=== Cuisine ===
- Jambon-mogettes (ham and white beans) is the most famous Vendean dish.
- The department is the largest brioche producer in France, with the Brioche de Vendée made in the Bocage.
- In the Plain of Luçon, préfou is a garlic bread that can be served as an hors d'oeuvre.
- In the marshland of the North-West, the poultry of Challans, especially duck, is well known in the gastronomic world.
- The department has several small vineyards, around Brem-sur-Mer, Mareuil-sur-Lay-Dissais, Vix, and Pissotte.

== Government ==
In the Vendée, 31 members, elected through universal suffrage, govern the affairs of the department, with 26 members on the right-wing and 5 members on the left-wing.

The Prefect represents the French State in the department.

== Politics ==
The president of the Departmental Council is Alain Lebœuf, elected in July 2021. Previous Presidents were Bruno Retailleau and Philippe de Villiers.

| Party | | seats |
|---|---|---|
| • | Miscellaneous Right | 14 |
| • | Movement for France | 10 |
| | Socialist Party | 4 |
| • | Union for a Popular Movement | 2 |
| | Miscellaneous Left | 1 |
| • | New Centre | 1 |

=== Current National Assembly Representatives ===
| Constituency | Member | Party |
|---|---|---|
| Vendée's 1st constituency | Philippe Latombe | MoDem |
| Vendée's 2nd constituency | Béatrice Bellamy | H |
| Vendée's 3rd constituency | Stéphane Buchou | RE |
| Vendée's 4th constituency | Véronique Besse | DVD |
| Vendée's 5th constituency | Pierre Henriet | RE |

=== National Assembly Representatives (2017 to 2022) ===
| Constituency | Member | Party |
|---|---|---|
| Vendée's 1st constituency | Philippe Latombe | MoDem |
| Vendée's 2nd constituency | Patrick Loiseau | MoDem |
| Vendée's 3rd constituency | Stéphane Buchou | La République En Marche! |
| Vendée's 4th constituency | Martine Leguille-Balloy | La République En Marche! |
| Vendée's 5th constituency | Pierre Henriet | La République En Marche! |

== See also ==
- Cantons of the Vendée department
- Communes of the Vendée department
- Arrondissements of the Vendée department
- Vendée Globe
- Julien Le Blant
