= 2024 French legislative election in Charente-Maritime =

Following the first round of the 2024 French legislative election on 30 June 2024, runoff elections in each constituency where no candidate received a vote share greater than 50 percent were scheduled for 7 July. Candidates permitted to stand in the runoff elections needed to either come in first or second place in the first round or achieve more than 12.5 percent of the votes of the entire electorate (as opposed to 12.5 percent of the vote share due to low turnout).

== Charente-Maritime ==
=== 1st constituency ===
Candidate	Party or alliance		First round		Second round	
Candidate	Party or alliance		Votes	%	Votes	%
Olivier Falorni	Miscellaneous left	Radical Party of the Left	34,824	45.64	54,353	74.71
Jean-Marc Soubeste	New Popular Front	The Ecologists	22,618	29.64		
Monique Griseti	National Rally		17,278	22.65	18,396	25.29
Nicolas Francois	Reconquête		975	1.28		
Antoine Colin	Far-left	Lutte Ouvrière	430	0.56		
Philippe Pere	Independent		170	0.22		
Yasmina Samri	Miscellaneous left	Independent	2	0.00		
Françoise Ramel	Regionalists	Independent	0	0.00		
Total			76,297	100.00	72,749	100.00
Valid votes			76,297	98.15	72,749	95.80
Invalid votes			383	0.49	855	1.13
Blank votes			1,055	1.36	2,338	3.08
Total votes			77,735	100.00	75,942	100.00
Registered voters/turnout			111,882	69.48	111,891	67.87

=== 2nd constituency ===
Candidate	Party or alliance		First round		Second round	
Candidate	Party or alliance		Votes	%	Votes	%
Karen Bertholom	National Rally		26,862	34.41	33,155	46.61
Benoît Biteaut	New Popular Front	The Ecologists	21,027	26.94	37,985	53.39
Anne-Laure Babault	Ensemble	Democratic Movement	19,773	25.33		
Hervé Blanché	The Republicans		9,651	12.36		
Frédéric Castello	Far-left	Lutte Ouvrière	749	0.96		
Total			78,062	100.00	71,140	100.00
Valid votes			78,062	97.56	71,140	89.25
Invalid votes			577	0.72	1,989	2.50
Blank votes			1,379	1.72	6,581	8.26
Total votes			80,018	100.00	79,710	100.00
Registered voters/turnout			113,630	70.42	113,648	70.14

=== 3rd constituency ===
Candidate	Party or alliance		First round		Second round	
Candidate	Party or alliance		Votes	%	Votes	%
Stéphane Morin	National Rally		22,759	40.85	26,378	49.94
Fabrice Barusseau	New Popular Front	Socialist Party	15,637	28.07	26,441	50.06
Jean-Philippe Ardouin	Ensemble	Renaissance	15,536	27.88		
Anne-Catherine Godde	Far-left	Lutte Ouvrière	1,196	2.15		
Gérald Dahan-Berthelot	Miscellaneous left	Independent	587	1.05		
Total			55,715	100.00	52,819	100.00
Valid votes			55,715	96.54	52,819	91.12
Invalid votes			690	1.20	1,403	2.42
Blank votes			1,304	2.26	3,742	6.46
Total votes			57,709	100.00	57,964	100.00
Registered voters/turnout			83,726	68.93	83,737	69.22

=== 4th constituency ===
Candidate	Party or alliance		First round		Second round	
Candidate	Party or alliance		Votes	%	Votes	%
Pascal Markowsky	National Rally		28,510	45.21	31,356	50.74
Raphaël Gérard	Ensemble	Renaissance	17,625	27.95	30,447	49.26
Danièle Desselles	New Popular Front	La France Insoumise	10,972	17.40		
Céline Drouillard	The Republicans		5,251	8.33		
Olivier Tripelon	Far-left	Lutte Ouvrière	707	1.12		
Total			63,065	100.00	61,803	100.00
Valid votes			63,065	96.96	61,803	94.59
Invalid votes			610	0.94	955	1.46
Blank votes			1,370	2.11	2,579	3.95
Total votes			65,045	100.00	65,337	100.00
Registered voters/turnout			94,544	68.80	94,554	69.10

=== 5th constituency ===
Candidate	Party or alliance		First round		Second round	
Candidate	Party or alliance		Votes	%	Votes	%
Aymeric Mongelous	National Rally		36,296	43.83	39,259	47.89
Christophe Plassard	Ensemble	Horizons	27,124	32.75	42,725	52.11
Anne Brachet	New Popular Front	Socialist Party	18,344	22.15		
Danièle Cassette	Far-left	Lutte Ouvrière	1,051	1.27		
Total			82,815	100.00	81,984	100.00
Valid votes			82,815	97.31	81,984	95.47
Invalid votes			676	0.79	1,128	1.31
Blank votes			1,609	1.89	2,758	3.21
Total votes			85,100	100.00	85,870	100.00
Registered voters/turnout			120,296	70.74	120,317	71.37
