= Canton of Tonnay-Boutonne =

Coordinates: 45°58′N 0°42′W

Tonnay-Boutonne
- Former canton
- Interactive map of Tonnay-Boutonne
- Country: France
- Region: Nouvelle-Aquitaine
- Department: Charente-Maritime
- No. of communes: {{{nbcomm}}}
- Disbanded: 2015
- Area: 121.7 km^{2} (47.0 sq mi)
- Population (2012): 3,417
  - Density: 28.08/km^{2} (72.72/sq mi)

The Canton of Tonnay-Boutonne is a former canton of the Charente-Maritime department in France. It was disbanded following the French canton reorganisation which came into effect in March 2015. It consisted of 11 communes, which joined the canton of Saint-Jean-d'Angély in 2015. It had 3,417 inhabitants (2012). The lowest point is the river Boutonne near Puy-du-Lac (1 m), the highest point is at Nachamps at 66 m. The seat of the canton was Tonnay-Boutonne.

== Communes ==
The canton comprised the following communes:

- Annezay
- Chantemerle-sur-la-Soie
- Chervettes
- Nachamps
- Puy-du-Lac
- Puyrolland
- Saint-Crépin
- Saint-Laurent-de-la-Barrière
- Saint-Loup
- Tonnay-Boutonne
- Torxé

== Population history ==
Year	Population
1962	2,786
1968	3,120
1975	2,948
1982	2,824
1990	2,862
1999	3,013
2008	3,237

== See also ==
- Cantons of the Charente-Maritime department
