= Dominique Bussereau =

French politician (born 1952)

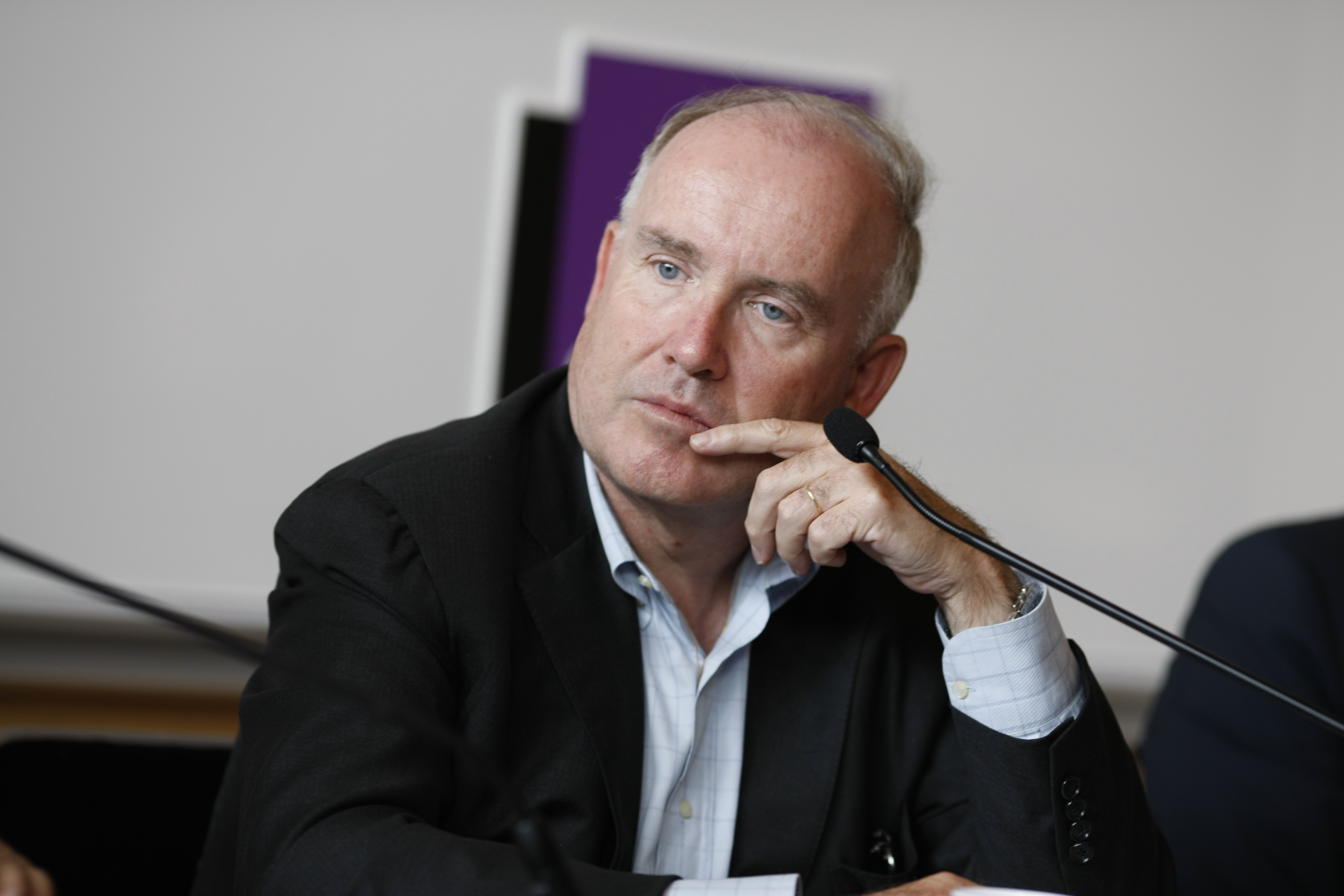
- Dominique Bussereau in 2009

Minister of Agriculture, Fisheries, Food and Rural Affairs
- In office 2004–2007
- President: Jacques Chirac
- Prime Minister: Jean-Pierre Raffarin; Dominique de Villepin
- Preceded by: Hervé Gaymard
- Succeeded by: Christine Lagarde

Member of the National Assembly for Charente-Maritime's 4th constituency
- In office 14 December 2010 – 20 June 2017
- Preceded by: Jean-Claude Beaulieu
- Succeeded by: Raphaël Gérard
- In office 2 April 1993 – 7 June 2002
- Preceded by: Philippe Marchand
- Succeeded by: Jean-Claude Beaulieu

Personal details
- Born: 13 July 1952 (age 74) Tours, France
- Party: The Republicans (until 2018)
- Education: Sciences Po

Dominique Bussereau (French pronunciation: [dɔminik bysʁo]; born 13 July 1952) is a French politician. He is president of the departmental council of Charente-Maritime since 2008 and president of the Assembly of the Departments of France since 2015.

He was Secretary of State for Transport within the government of François Fillon. Appointed to the post on 18 May 2007, he was previously Minister of Agriculture (2004–2007), Minister-Delegate for Aviation and Maritime Affairs (2002–2004) and Minister-Delegate for Budgets (2004).

== Political career ==
=== Governmental functions ===
- Secretary of State for Transport : 2007–2010.
- Minister of Agriculture, Fisheries, Food and Rural Affairs : 2004–2007.
- Secretary of State for the Budget : March–November 2004.
- Secretary of State for Transport and Sea : 2002–2004.

=== Electoral mandates ===
==== National Assembly of France ====
MP of the Charente-Maritime's 4th constituency : 1986–1988 / 1993–2002 (Became secretary of State in 2002) / Re-elected in 2007, but he stays minister. Elected in 1986, re-elected in 1993, 1997, 2002, 2007, 2012.

==== Regional Council ====
Regional councillor of Poitou-Charentes : 1992–1993 (Resignation) / March–April 2004 (Resignation) / March–September 2010 (Resignation). Re-elected in 2004, 2010.

==== Departmental Council ====
- President of the Departmental Council of Charente-Maritime : Since 2008.
- General councillor of Charente-Maritime : Since 1985. Re-elected in 1992, 1998, 2004.

==== Municipal Council ====
- Mayor of Saint-Georges-de-Didonne : 1989–2002 (Resignation). Re-elected in 1995, 2001.
- Deputy-mayor of Saint-Georges-de-Didonne : 2002–2008.
- Municipal councillor of Saint-Georges-de-Didonne : 1989–2008. Re-elected in 1995, 2001.
- Deputy-mayor of Royan : 1983–1989.
- Municipal councillor of Royan : 1983–1989.

== Honours ==
- 2007 – Order of the Rising Sun, Grand Cordon (Japan).

Political offices
Preceded by Hervé Gaymard	Minister of Agriculture; 2004–2007	Succeeded by Christine Lagarde
