= Charente-Maritime's 3rd constituency =

Constituency of the National Assembly of France

3rd constituency of Charente-Maritime
- inline Constituency of the National Assembly of France

- Constituency in department

- Charente-Maritime in France
- Incumbent deputy: Fabrice Barusseau; Socialist
- Department: Charente-Maritime
- Cantons: (pre-2105) Aulnay, Burie, Loulay, Matha, Saintes-Est (part), Saintes-Nord, Saintes-Ouest, Saint-Hilaire-de-Villefranche, Saint-Jean-d'Angély, Saint-Savinien, Tonnay-Boutonne
- Registered voters: 82,186 (2017)

The 3rd constituency of Charente-Maritime (French: Troisième circonscription de la Charente-Maritime) is one of five electoral districts in the department of Charente-Maritime, each of which returns one deputy to the French National Assembly in elections using the two-round system, with a run-off if no candidate receives more than 50% of the vote in the first round.

== Description ==
The constituency is made up of 10 whole (pre-2105) cantons – those of Aulnay, Burie, Loulay, Matha, Saintes-Nord, Saintes-Ouest, Saint-Hilaire-de-Villefranche, Saint-Jean-d'Angély, Saint-Savinien, and Tonnay-Boutonne – plus the major part of the canton of Saintes-Est (all communes except those of Colombiers and La Jard).

At the time of the 1999 census (which was the basis for the most recent redrawing of constituency boundaries, carried out in 2010) the 3rd constituency had a total population of 100,186.

== Deputies ==
| Election | Member | Party |
|---|---|---|
| 1958 | André Brugerolle | CNIP |
| 1962 | André Brugerolle | CD |
| 1967 | André Brugerolle | CD |
| 1968 | André Brugerolle | CD |
| 1973 | André Brugerolle | CD |
| 1978 | Roland Beix | PS |
| 1981 | Roland Beix | PS |
| 1986 | Proportional representation – no election by constituency | |
| 1988 | Roland Beix | PS |
| 1993 | Xavier de Roux | UDF |
| 1997 | Jean Rouger | PS |
| 2002 | Xavier de Roux | UMP |
| 2007 | Catherine Quéré | PS |
| 2012 | Catherine Quéré | PS |
| 2017 | Jean-Philippe Ardouin | LREM |
| 2022 | Jean-Philippe Ardouin | RE |
| 2024 | Fabrice Barusseau | PS |

== Election results ==
=== 2024 ===
| Candidate | Party | Alliance | First round | | | Second round | | |
| Candidate | Party | Alliance | Votes | % | +/– | Votes | % | +/– |
|---|---|---|---|---|---|---|---|---|
| Stéphane Morin | RN | | 22,759 | 40.85 | +18.55 | 26,378 | 49.94 | |
| Fabrice Barusseau | PS | NFP | 15,637 | 28.07 | -2.85 | 26,441 | 50.06 | |
| Jean-Philippe Ardouin | RE | ENS | 15,536 | 27.88 | +3.35 | WITHDREW | | |
| Anne-Catherine Godde | LO | | 1,196 | 2.15 | +1.57 | | | |
| Gérald Dahan-Berthelot | DIV | | 587 | 1.05 | N/A | | | |
| Valid votes | | | 55,715 | 96.54 | -1.09 | 52,819 | 91.12 | |
| Blank votes | | | 1,304 | 2.26 | +0.56 | 3,742 | 6.46 | |
| Null votes | | | 690 | 1.20 | +0.53 | 1,403 | 2.42 | |
| Turnout | | | 57,709 | 68.93 | +18.79 | 57,964 | 69.22 | |
| Abstentions | | | 26,017 | 31.07 | -18.79 | 25,773 | 30.78 | |
| Registered voters | | | 83,726 | | | 83,737 | | |
Source: Ministry of the Interior, Le Monde
| Result | | | | | | PS GAIN FROM RE | | |

=== 2022 ===
Legislative Election 2022: Charente-Maritime's 3rd constituency
| Party | Candidate | Votes | % | ±% |
|---|---|---|---|---|
| LREM (Ensemble) | Jean-Philippe Ardouin | 10,111 | 24.53 | -4.24 |
| RN | Nathalie Collard | 9,192 | 22.30 | +7.78 |
| LFI (NUPÉS) | Gérald Dahan | 8,686 | 21.07 | −4.04 |
| FGR | Fabrice Barusseau | 4,061 | 9.85 | N/A |
| LR (UDC) | Bertrand Giraud | 2,826 | 6.86 | −8.04 |
| DVC | Pierre Dietz | 1,922 | 4.66 | N/A |
| REC | Maurice Pineau | 1,680 | 4.08 | N/A |
| Others | N/A | 2,738 | 6.64 | |
| Turnout | | 41,216 | 50.14 | −0.09 |
2nd round result
| LREM (Ensemble) | Jean-Philippe Ardouin | 18,295 | 51.18 | -6.34 |
| RN | Nathalie Collard | 17,452 | 48.82 | N/A |
| Turnout | | 35,747 | 47.84 | +5.95 |
| LREM hold | | | | |

=== 2017 ===
| Candidate | Label | First round | | Second round | |
| Candidate | Label | Votes | % | Votes | % |
|---|---|---|---|---|---|
| Jean-Philippe Ardouin | REM | 11,543 | 28.77 | 16,739 | 57.52 |
| Frédéric Neveu | LR | 5,979 | 14.90 | 12,360 | 42.48 |
| Rachel Cointet | FN | 5,717 | 14.25 | | |
| Rémy Catrou | FI | 5,450 | 13.58 | | |
| Françoise Mesnard | PS | 4,084 | 10.18 | | |
| Julien Papineau | DVG | 3,307 | 8.24 | | |
| Henriette Diadio-Dasylva | UDI | 876 | 2.18 | | |
| Alain Georgeon | DIV | 583 | 1.45 | | |
| Marie-France Moquet | PCF | 541 | 1.35 | | |
| Joëlle de Corte | ECO | 372 | 0.93 | | |
| Renée-Éliane Benchimol-Lauribe | PRG | 344 | 0.86 | | |
| Jean-Louis Lavazec | EXG | 267 | 0.67 | | |
| Patrick Chebroux | DVD | 222 | 0.55 | | |
| Frédéric Sananes | DVG | 219 | 0.55 | | |
| Éric Belleperche | EXD | 216 | 0.54 | | |
| Alexandre Beauvais | DVD | 183 | 0.46 | | |
| Isabelle Ninvirth | DIV | 178 | 0.44 | | |
| Bernard Chrétien | DVG | 40 | 0.10 | | |
| Votes | | 40,121 | 100.00 | 29,099 | 100.00 |
| Valid votes | | 40,121 | 97.18 | 29,099 | 84.53 |
| Blank votes | | 781 | 1.89 | 3,554 | 10.32 |
| Null votes | | 384 | 0.93 | 1,771 | 5.14 |
| Turnout | | 41,286 | 50.23 | 34,424 | 41.89 |
| Abstentions | | 40,909 | 49.77 | 47,762 | 58.11 |
| Registered voters | | 82,195 | | 82,186 | |
Source: Ministry of the Interior

=== 2012 ===
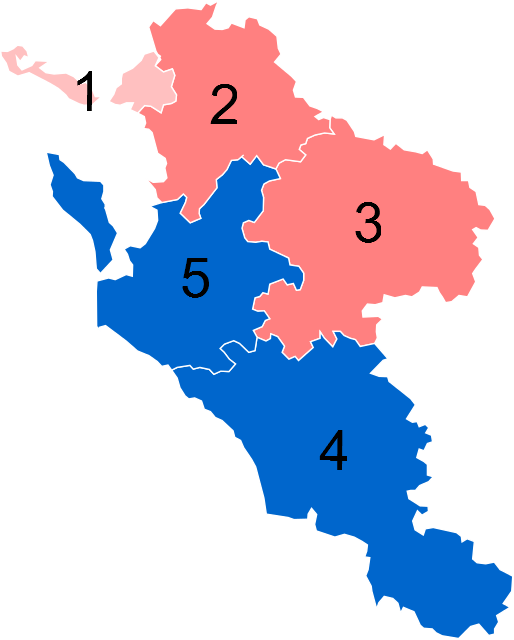
Results in the Charente-Maritime's five constituencies in 2012 : pale pink (Miscellaneous left), pink (PS), blue (UMP)

Summary of the 10 June and 17 June 2012 French legislative election in Charante Maritime’s 3rd Constituency
| Candidate | Party | | 1st round | | 2nd round | |
| Candidate | Party | | Votes | % | Votes | % |
|---|---|---|---|---|---|---|
| Catherine Quere | Socialist Party | PS | 20,403 | 43.96% | 26,574 | 59.12% |
| Frédéric Neveu | Union for a Popular Movement | UMP | 13,344 | 28.75% | 18,373 | 40.88% |
| Agnès Kliewer | Front National | FN | 5,444 | 11.73% | | |
| Michelle Carmouse | Left Front | FG | 2,564 | 5.52% | | |
| Stéphane Trifiletti | Europe Ecology – The Greens | EELV | 1,630 | 3.51% | | |
| Pierre Maudoux | Centrist | CEN | 1,072 | 2.31% | | |
| Serge Maupouet | Miscellaneous Left | DVG | 535 | 1.15% | | |
| Esther Willer | Miscellaneous Right | DVD | 429 | 0.92% | | |
| Joëlle de Corte | Ecologist | ECO | 373 | 0.80% | | |
| Hugues Auvray | Miscellaneous Right | DVD | 366 | 0.79% | | |
| Alexandre Kikolski | Far Left | EXG | 253 | 0.55% | | |
| Total | | | 46,413 | 100% | 44,947 | 100% |
| Registered voters | | | 81,745 | | 81,736 | |
| Blank/Void ballots | | | 849 | 1.04% | 1,560 | 1.91% |
| Turnout | | | 47,262 | 57.82% | 46,507 | 56.90% |
| Abstentions | | | 34,483 | 42.18% | 35,229 | 43.10% |
| Result | | | | | PS HOLD | |

=== 2007 ===
Summary of the 10 June and 17 June 2007 French legislative election in Charante Maritime’s 3rd Constituency
| Candidate | Party | | 1st round | | 2nd round | |
| Candidate | Party | | Votes | % | Votes | % |
|---|---|---|---|---|---|---|
| Catherine Quere | Socialist Party | PS | 15,446 | 31.99% | 25,501 | 52.02% |
| Xavier de Roux | Union for a Popular Movement | UMP | 19,037 | 39.43% | 23,522 | 47.98% |
| Jean-Philippe Ardouin | Democratic Movement | MoDem | 4,793 | 9.93% | | |
| Philippe Barotin | Hunting, Fishing, Nature, Traditions | CPNT | 1,525 | 3.16% | | |
| Yolande Bak | Front National | FN | 1,489 | 3.08% | | |
| Michelle Carmouse | Communist | PCF | 1,398 | 2.90% | | |
| Christian Couillaud | The Greens | VEC | 1,320 | 2.73% | | |
| Nadège Edwards | Far Left | EXG | 1,283 | 2.66% | | |
| Aline Mathieu | Movement for France | MPF | 910 | 1.88% | | |
| David Leveque | Independent | DIV | 463 | 0.96% | | |
| Khamssa Rahmani | Far Left | EXG | 338 | 0.70% | | |
| Christine Tasin | Miscellaneous Left | DVG | 276 | 0.57% | | |
| Total | | | 48,278 | 100% | 49,023 | 100% |
| Registered voters | | | 79,765 | | 79,763 | |
| Blank/Void ballots | | | 956 | 1.94% | 1,529 | 3.02% |
| Turnout | | | 49,234 | 61.72% | 50,552 | 63.38% |
| Abstentions | | | 30,531 | 38.28% | 29,211 | 36.62% |
| Result | | | | | PS gain from UMP | |

=== 2002 ===
Legislative Election 2002: Charente-Maritime's 3rd constituency
| Party | Candidate | Votes | % | ±% |
|---|---|---|---|---|
| UMP | Xavier de Roux | 16,969 | 34.72 | |
| PS | Jean Rouger | 14,962 | 30.61 | |
| FN | Jean-Michel Guilloteau | 4,149 | 8.49 | |
| UDF | Jean-Philippe Ardouin | 3,339 | 6.83 | |
| CPNT | Philippe Barotin | 2,507 | 5.13 | |
| LV | Dominique Godineau | 1,624 | 3.32 | |
| PCF | Michelle Carmouse | 1,418 | 2.90 | |
| Others | N/A | 3,912 | | |
| Turnout | | 50,074 | 65.46 | |
2nd round result
| UMP | Xavier de Roux | 25,060 | 53.77 | |
| PS | Jean Rouger | 21,547 | 46.23 | |
| Turnout | | 48,489 | 63.39 | |
| UMP gain from PS | | | | |

=== 1997 ===
Legislative Election 1997: Charente-Maritime's 3rd constituency
| Party | Candidate | Votes | % | ±% |
|---|---|---|---|---|
| PS | Jean Rougé | 16,504 | 34.00 | |
| UDF | Xavier de Roux | 15,793 | 32.53 | |
| FN | Gilbert Gaillard | 4,758 | 9.80 | |
| PCF | Simon Rinaldi | 4,538 | 9.35 | |
| LV | Christian Couillaud | 2,452 | 5.05 | |
| MPF | Patrick Chebroux | 1,919 | 3.95 | |
| MEI | René Binaud | 1,720 | 3.54 | |
| MRC | Xavier Boniface | 864 | 1.78 | |
| Turnout | | 51,460 | 68.13 | |
2nd round result
| PS | Jean Rougé | 28,790 | 54.86 | |
| UDF | Xavier de Roux | 23,690 | 45.14 | |
| Turnout | | 55,313 | 73.23 | |
| PS gain from UDF | | | | |

== Sources ==
- Notes and portraits of the French MPs under the Fifth Republic, French National Assembly
- 2012 French legislative elections: Charente-Maritime's 3rd constituency (first round and run-off), Minister of the Interior
