= Catherine Quéré =

French politician

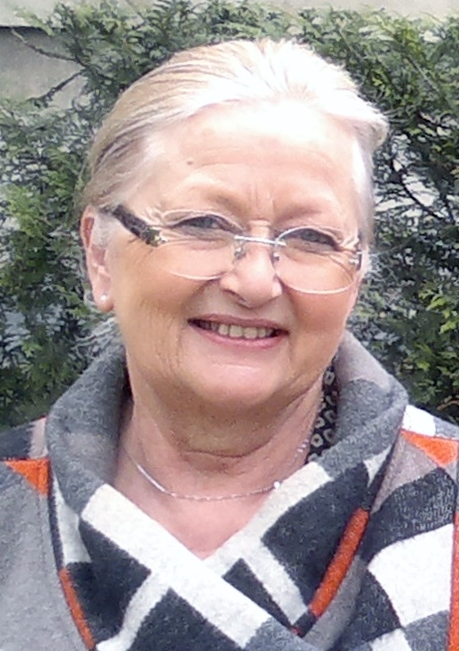
- MP Catherine Quéré in Paris in 2012

Member of the Parliament
- In office 20 June 2007 – 2017
- Preceded by: Xavier de Roux
- Succeeded by: Jean-Philippe Ardouin
- Constituency: Charente-Maritime (3rd)

Vice-president of the Poitou-Charentes Regional Council
- In office 28 March 2004 – 1 September 2007

Regional councillor
- In office 28 March 2004 – 1 September 2007
- Constituency: Charente-Maritime

Personal details
- Born: 16 March 1948 (age 78) Angoulême (16)
- Party: Socialist Party
- Profession: Wine grower
- Website: http://www.catherine-quere.fr/

Catherine Quéré (born 16 March 1948 in Angoulême, Charente) is a French politician and a member of the Socialist Party.

A vice-president of the Poitou-Charentes Regional Council between 2004 and 2007, she was the MP for Charente-Maritime's 3rd constituency from 2007 to 2017. She was a member of the Socialist, Radical, Citizen and Miscellaneous Left parliamentary group.

== Political career ==
=== Poitou-Charentes Regional Council (2004−2007) ===
A wine grower by profession, Catherine Quéré began her political career in the 2004 regional elections.

She figured in second position on the socialist list in Charente-Maritime and was elected as a regional councillor in Poitou-Charentes. She was a vice-president of the Poitou-Charentes Regional Council during three years (2004–2007).

On 9 July 2007, she resigned as a regional councillor in accordance with the rule of the "unique mandate" instituted within the Poitou-Charentes Regional Council.

=== MP of Saintes (2007−2017) ===
In the 2007 legislative election, Catherine Quéré defeated Xavier de Roux, mayor of Chaniers and outgoing MP.

In the first round, she arrived in second position (31.99%, 15,446 votes) whereas Xavier de Roux came first with 39.43% (19.037 votes). In the run-off, she was elected with 52.02% (25.501 votes) as an MP of the Charente-Maritime's 3rd constituency.

In the 2012 legislative election, she was largely re-elected as an MP of the Charente-Maritime's 3rd constituency.

In the first round, she largely came first with 43.96% (20,403 votes) and in the run-off was re-elected as an MP with 59.12% (26,574 votes).

She did not contest the 2017 French legislative election.

== Political mandates ==
=== National mandate ===
- MP of the Charente-Maritime's 3rd constituency (20 June 2007 – 2017): Socialist, Radical, Citizen and Miscellaneous Left parliamentary group; secretary of the committee of the sustainable development and spatial planning, vice-president of the friendship groups of France/Macedonia and France/Malaysia.

=== Former local mandate ===
- Vice-president of the Poitou-Charentes Regional Council : 28 March 2004 – 1 September 2007
