= Annezay =

- Commune
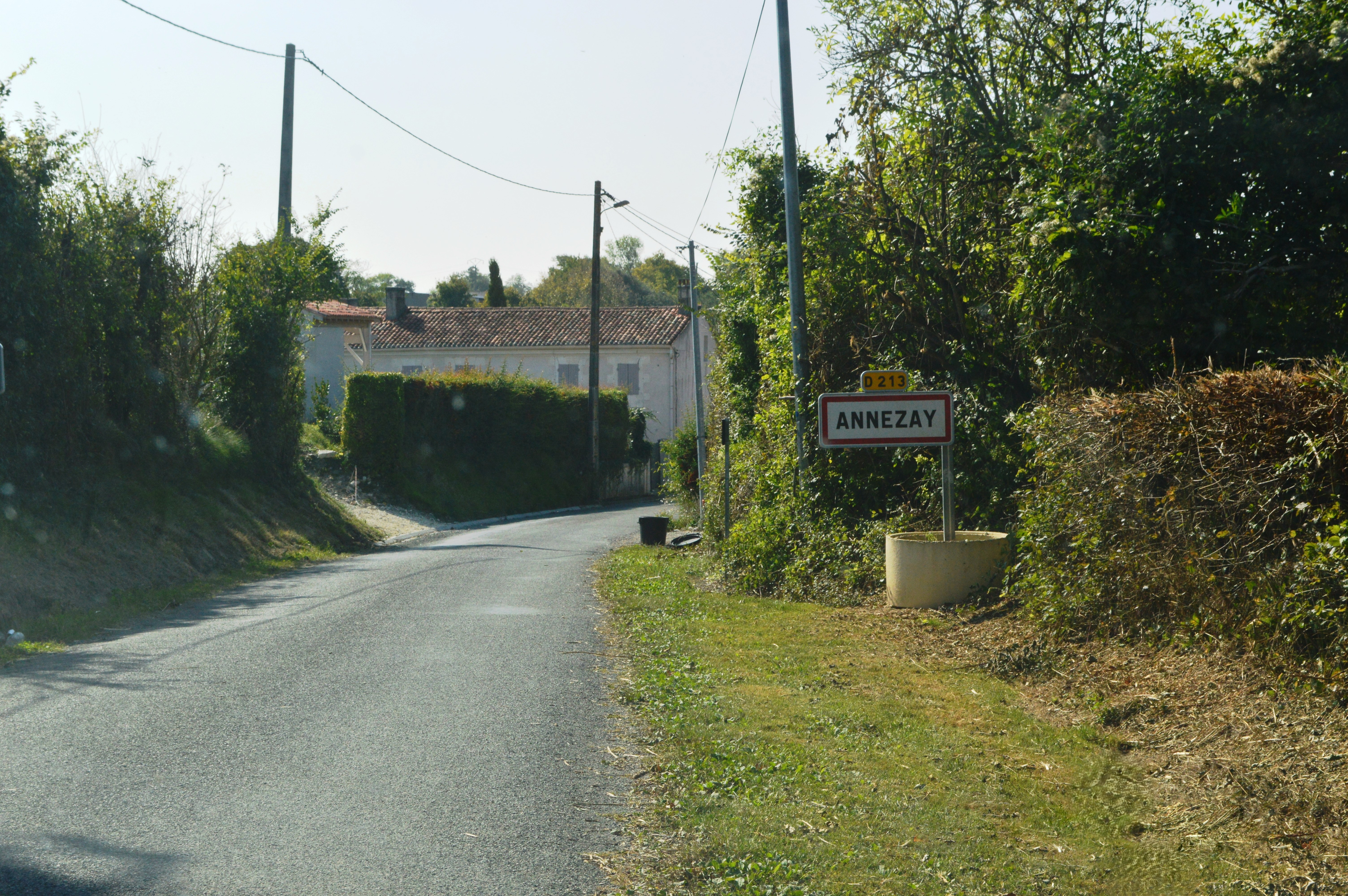
- The road into Annezay
- Location of Annezay
- Location within France Location within Nouvelle-Aquitaine
- Coordinates: 46°00′36″N 0°42′45″W
- Country: France
- Region: Nouvelle-Aquitaine
- Department: Charente-Maritime
- Arrondissement: Saint-Jean-d'Angély
- Canton: Saint-Jean-d'Angély
- Intercommunality: Vals de Saintonge Communauté

Government
  - Mayor (2020–2026): Fabien Brodu
- Area^{1}: 7.43 km^{2} (2.87 sq mi)
- Elevation: 60 m (200 ft)
- Highest elevation: 65 m (213 ft)
- Lowest elevation: 5 m (16 ft)
- Population (2023): 168
  - Density: 22.6/km^{2} (58.6/sq mi)
- Time zone: UTC+01:00 (CET)
  - Summer (DST): UTC+02:00 (CEST)
- INSEE/Postal code: 17012 /17380
- ^{1} French Land Register data, which excludes lakes, ponds, glaciers > 1 km^{2} (0.386 sq mi or 247 acres) and river estuaries.

Annezay (French pronunciation: [anzɛ]) is a commune in the Charente-Maritime department in the Nouvelle-Aquitaine region of southwestern France.

== Geography ==
Annezay is located some 12 km south-east of Surgères and 16 km north-west of Saint-Jean-d'Angély. Access is by the D118 road from Saint-Crépin in the south-west passing through the west of the commune and continuing north to Chervettes. There is also the D213 from the village east to Saint-Loup. The D107E2 road also passes through the east of the commune from the D107 in the north to Tonnay-Boutonne in the south. Apart from the village there are also the hamlets of Le Grand Vivroux and Le Tramaillou in the commune. Apart from a few small patches of forest the commune is entirely farmland.

There are two small unnamed streams south of the village.

== Administration ==
List of Successive Mayors

From	To	Name	Party
1995	2001	Abel Daubigne	ind.
2001	2020	Philippe Jouve	DVD
2020	2026	Fabien Brodu	

== Population ==
The inhabitants of the commune are known as Anneziens or Anneziennes in French.

Historical population
Year	Pop.	±% p.a.
1968	214	—
1975	194	−1.39%
1982	178	−1.22%
1990	149	−2.20%
1999	175	+1.80%
2007	162	−0.96%
2012	169	+0.85%
2017	162	−0.84%
2023	168	+0.61%
Source: INSEE

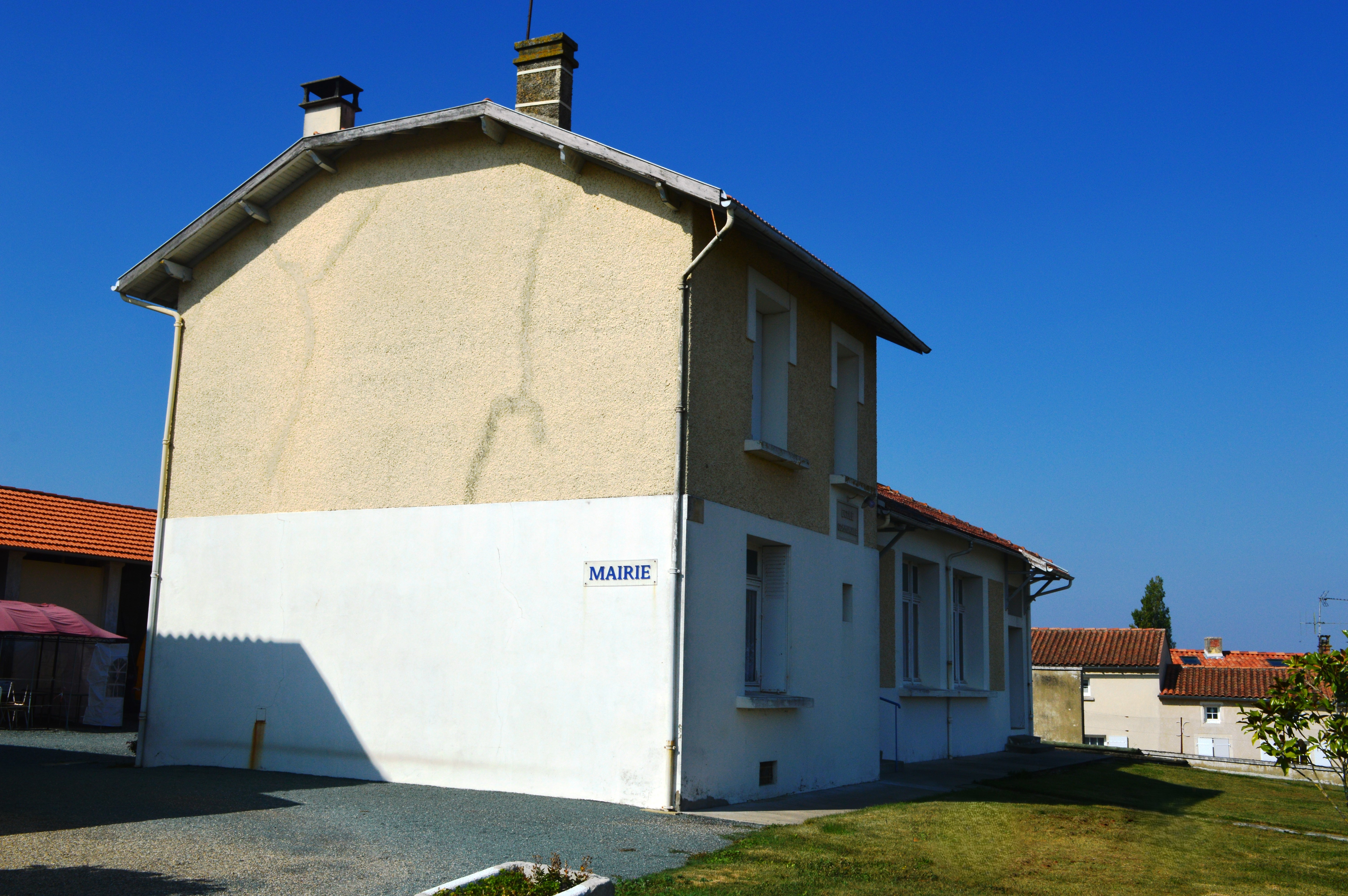
The Town Hall

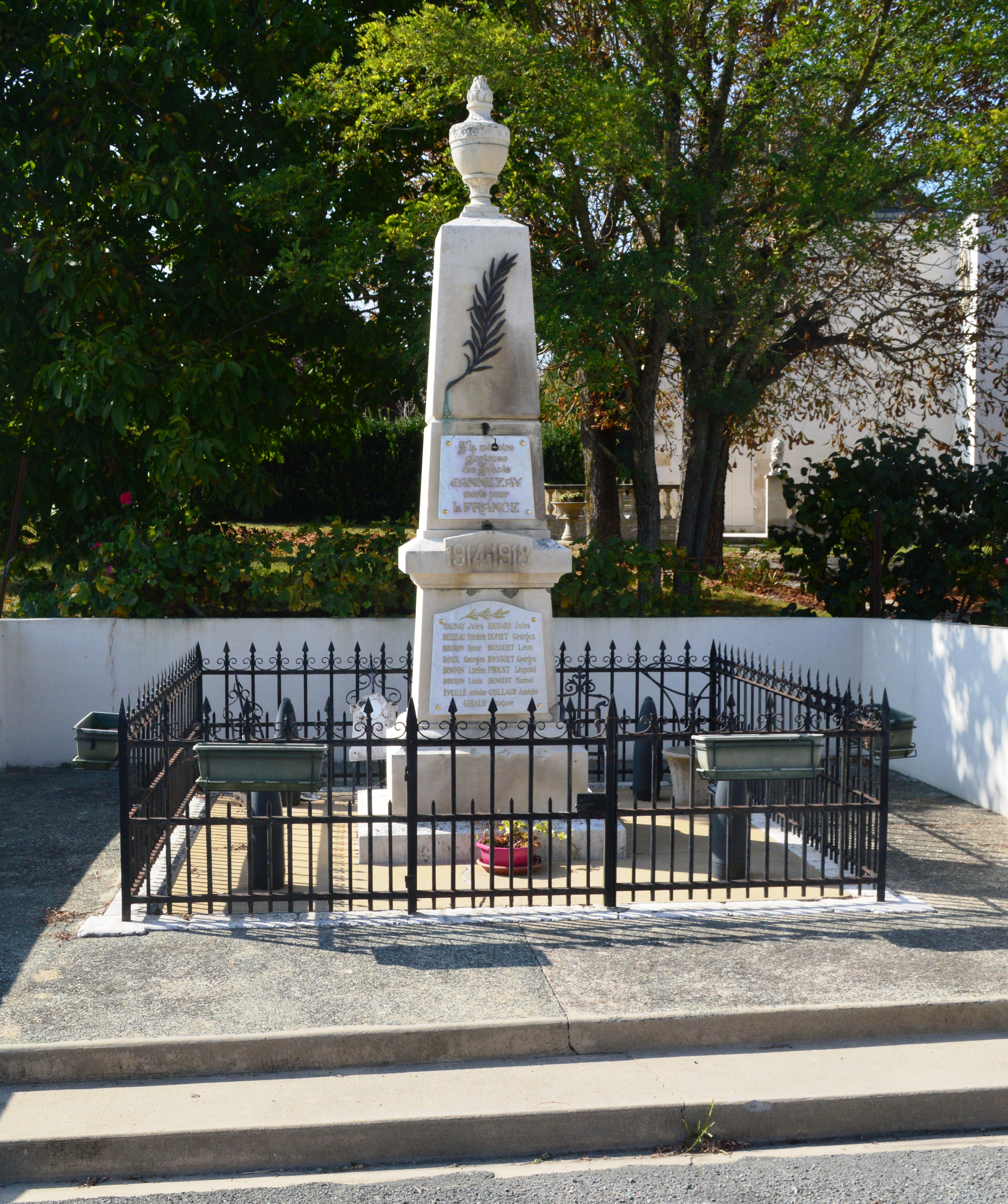
Annezay War Memorial

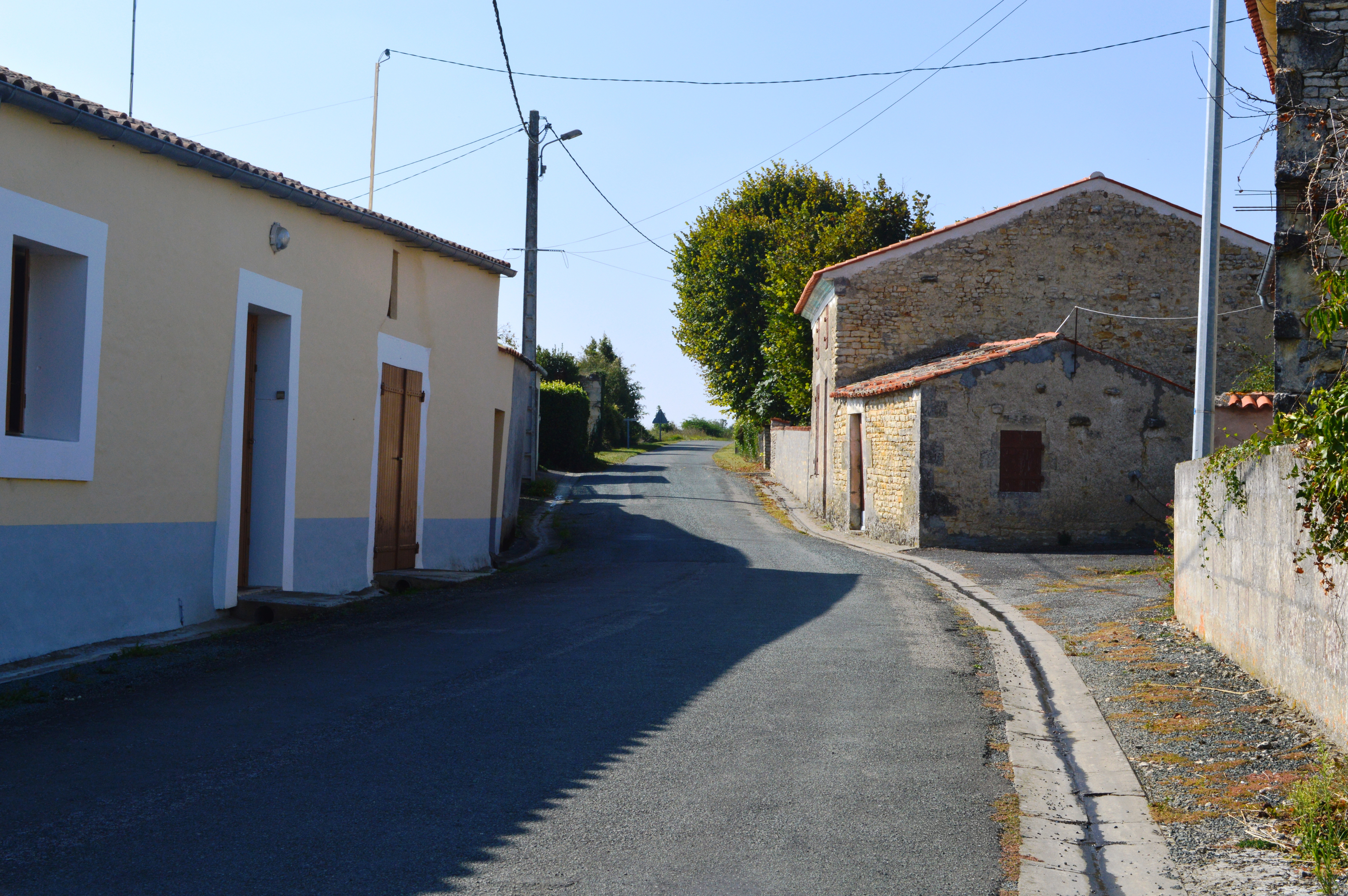
A street in Annezay

== Culture and heritage ==
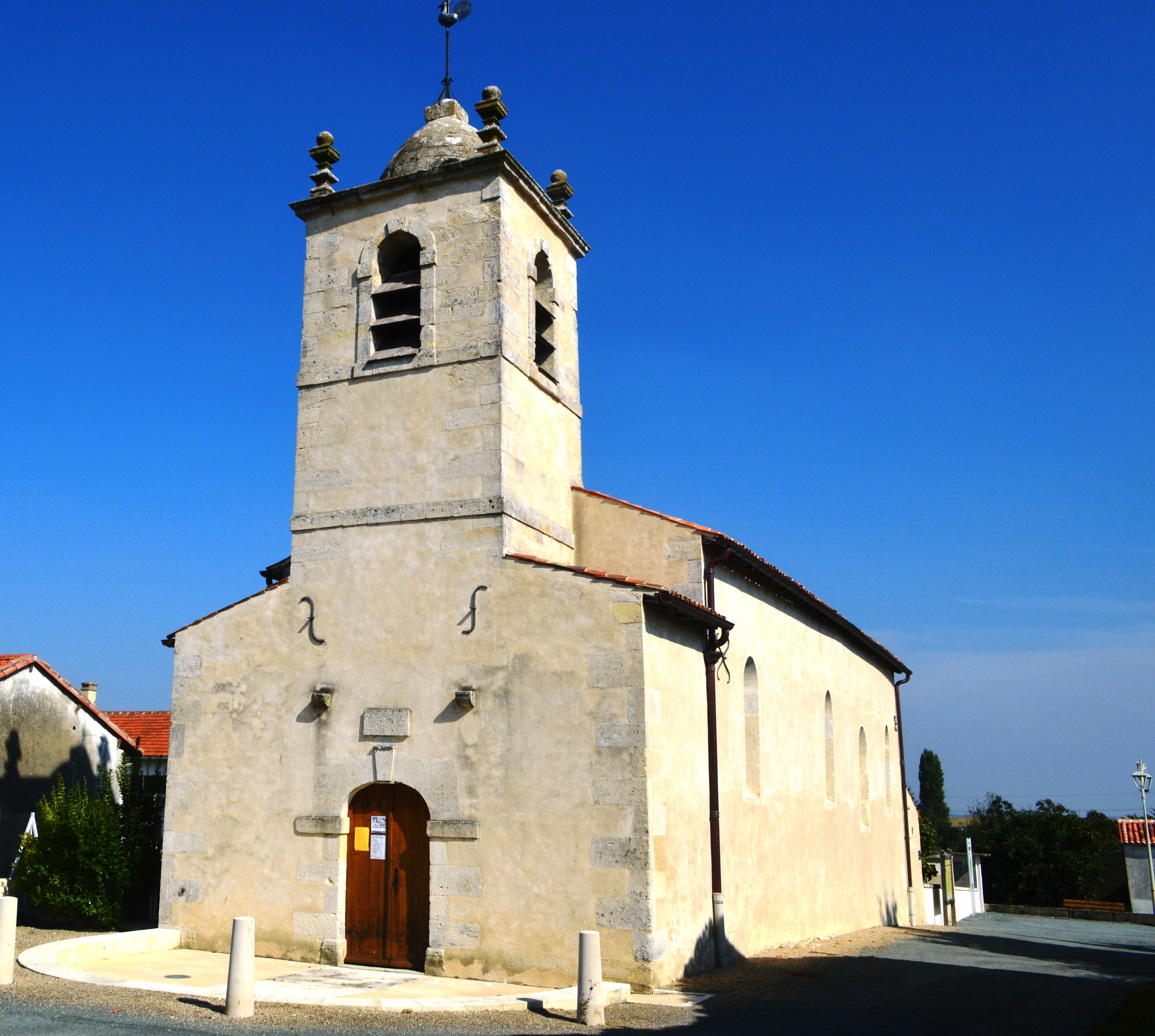
The Church of Saint Peter

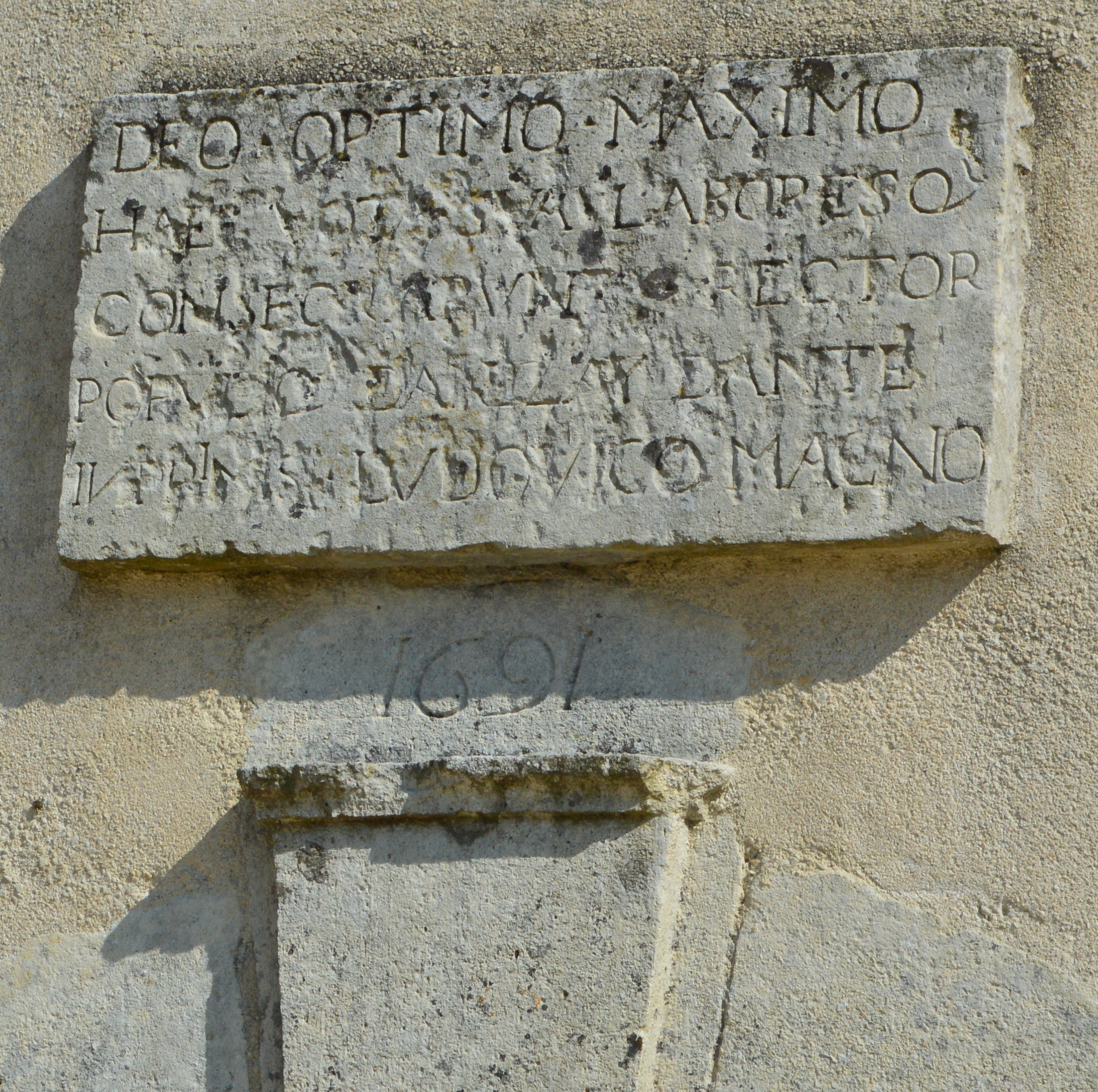
A Latin inscription dated 1691 over the door of the Church

=== Religious heritage ===
The Church of Saint Peter contains a Chasuble, Stole, and Maniple (18th century) that are registered as an historical object.

== See also ==
- Communes of the Charente-Maritime department
