= Christophe Plassard =

French politician

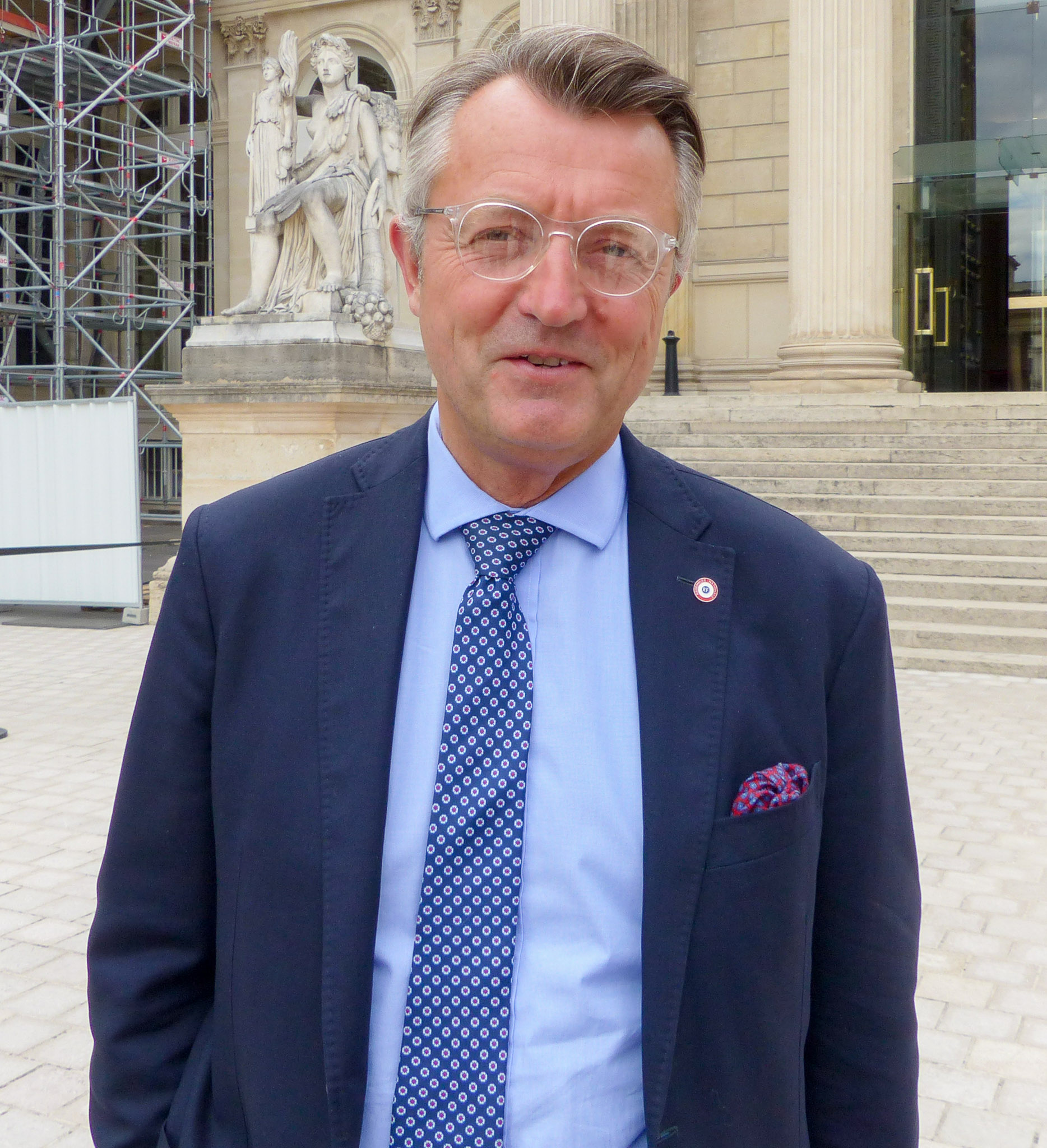

Member of the National Assembly for Charente-Maritime's 5th constituency
- Incumbent
- Assumed office June 22, 2022
- Preceded by: Didier Quentin

Personal details
- Born: 19 November 1967 (age 58) La Garenne-Colombes, France
- Party: Union for a Popular Movement The Republicans Agir Horizons

Christophe Plassard (born November 19, 1967, in La Garenne-Colombes (Hauts-de-Seine)) is a French politician. He was elected Member of Parliament in 2022 as part of the Ensemble coalition.

== Early life and career ==
Plassard spent his childhood in the Paris suburbs. He then left the Paris region for Royan, where he settled. He runs a business specializing in corporate advertising. For 15 years, he was a member of the Centre de jeunes Dirigeants du Poitou, of which he was also president. He was then co-president of the Club d'Entreprises de Royan and vice-president of the Conseil Économique Social et Environnemental Régional Nouvelle-Aquitaine.

== Political career ==
Politically, Plassard first joined the Union for a Popular Movement and became part of the Joppéist movement. He ran for mayor of Royan in 2008 and 2010 (partial municipal election), but failed both times. He joined the ranks of Emmanuel Macron's party and became an opposition municipal councillor in Royan in 2020. Initially a member of Franck Riester's Agir party, he later joined Édouard Philippe's Horizons party.

=== Member of the National Assembly, 2022–present ===
Designated by Horizons as part of the Ensemble coalition in the fifth constituency of Charente-Maritime for the 2022 legislative elections, with Vanessa Parent, councillor for Oléron, as deputy. He came second in the first round, with 23.83%, behind candidate Séverine Werbrouck of the Rassemblement National. Édouard Philippe supported him between the two rounds. Plassard won the second round with 51.74% of the votes cast against the Rassemblement National candidate; in this traditional right-wing bastion, he succeeded Didier Quentin (LR), who was eliminated in the first round.

In parliament, Plassard has since been serving on the Finance Committee and the Committee on European Affairs. In 2026, Prime Minister Sébastien Lecornu asked him and two other parliamentarians from his center-right coalition – Charles Rodwell and Jean-Louis Thiériot – to report on France’s economic-security policies and those of its European partners, with particular attention to foreign investment screening.

In addition to his committee assignments, Plassard has been a member of the French Parliamentary Friendship Groups with the United Kingdom, the United Arab Emirates and Greece. He has also been part of the French delegation to the NATO Parliamentary Assembly.
