= Charente-Maritime's 4th constituency =

Constituency of the National Assembly of France

4th constituency of Charente-Maritime
- inline Constituency of the National Assembly of France

- Constituency in department

- Charente-Maritime in France
- Incumbent deputy: Pascal Markowsky; RN
- Department: Charente-Maritime
- Cantons: Archiac, Cozes, Gémozac, Jonzac, Mirambeau, Montendre, Montguyon, Montlieu-la-Garde, Pons, Royan-Est, Saint-Genis-de-Saintonge, and the communes of Colombiers and La Jard in Saintes-Est
- Registered voters: 89,894 (2017)

The 4th constituency of Charente-Maritime (French: Quatrième circonscription de la Charente-Maritime) is one of five electoral districts in the department of Charente-Maritime, each of which returns one deputy to the French National Assembly in elections using the two-round system, with a run-off if no candidate receives more than 50% of the vote in the first round.

== Description ==
The constituency is made up of 11 whole (pre-2015) cantons – those of Archiac, Cozes, Gémozac, Jonzac, Mirambeau, Montendre, Montguyon, Montlieu-la-Garde, Pons, Royan-Est, and Saint-Genis-de-Saintonge – plus two communes (Colombiers and La Jard) belonging to a twelfth: that of Saintes-Est.

At the time of the 1999 census (which was the basis for the most recent redrawing of constituency boundaries, carried out in 2010) the 4th constituency had a total population of 101,987.

== Deputies ==
Election	Member	Party
1958	André Bégouin	CNIP
1962	Daniel Daviaud	PRV
1967	Daniel Daviaud	PRV
1968	Louis Joanne	UDR
1973	Louis Joanne	RI
1978	Philippe Marchand	PS
1981	Philippe Marchand	PS
1986	Proportional representation – no election by constituency	
1988	Philippe Marchand	PS
1993	Dominique Bussereau	UDF
1997	Dominique Bussereau	UDF
2002	Dominique Bussereau	UMP
2007	Dominique Bussereau	UMP
2012	Dominique Bussereau	UMP
2017	Raphaël Gérard	LREM
2022	Raphaël Gérard	RE
2024	Pascal Markowsky	RN

== Election results ==
=== 2024 ===
Candidate	Party	Alliance	First round			Second round		
Candidate	Party	Alliance	Votes	%	+/–	Votes	%	+/–
Pascal Markowsky	RN		28,510	45.21	+19.44	31,356	50.74	
Raphaël Gérard	RE	ENS	17,625	27.95	+0.36	30,447	49.26	
Danièle Desselles	LFI	NFP	10,972	17.40	-2.33			
Céline Drouillard	LR		5,251	8.33	-6.45			
Olivier Tripelon	LO		707	1.12	-0.47			
Valid votes			63,065	96.96	-0.24	61,803	94.59	
Blank votes			1,370	2.11	+0.22	2,579	3.95	
Null votes			610	0.94	+0.02	955	1.46	
Turnout			65,045	68.80	+18.47	65,337	69.10	
Abstentions			29,499	31.20	-18.47	29,217	30.90	
Registered voters			94,544			94,554		
Source: Ministry of the Interior, Le Monde
Result						RN GAIN FROM RE		

=== 2022 ===
Legislative Election 2022: Charente-Maritime's 4th constituency
Party	Candidate	Votes	%	±%
LREM (Ensemble)	Raphaël Gérard	12,743	27.59	-6.26
RN	Pascal Markowsky	11,900	25.77	+8.78
LFI (NUPÉS)	Danièle Desselles	9,114	19.73	−1.90
LR (UDC)	Françoise De Roffignac	6,828	14.78	−7.42
REC	Jean Robin	1,935	4.19	N/A
DIV	Stéphane Loth	935	2.02	N/A
Others	N/A	2,727	5.90	
Turnout		46,182	50.33	−0.41
2nd round result
LREM (Ensemble)	Raphaël Gérard	21,447	50.90	-0.39
RN	Pascal Markowsky	20,685	49.10	N/A
Turnout		42,132	48.92	+4.74
LREM hold				

=== 2017 ===
Candidate	Label	First round		Second round	
Candidate	Label	Votes	%	Votes	%
Raphaël Gérard	REM	15,055	33.85	18,070	51.29
Loic Girard	LR	9,872	22.20	17,159	48.71
Isabelle Texier	FN	7,556	16.99		
Lucie Kirchner	FI	5,324	11.97		
Fabienne Dugas-Raveneau	PS	2,536	5.70		
Laurence Marcillaud	ECO	1,194	2.68		
Benoît Biteau	PRG	824	1.85		
Éric Devise	DLF	782	1.76		
Pascal Pellerin	PCF	568	1.28		
Valerie Barraud	EXG	379	0.85		
Ingrid Chrismann	DIV	298	0.67		
Philippe Davril	DVG	88	0.20		
Votes		44,476	100.00	35,229	100.00
Valid votes		44,476	97.51	35,229	88.70
Blank votes		780	1.71	2,969	7.48
Null votes		357	0.78	1,521	3.83
Turnout		45,613	50.74	39,719	44.18
Abstentions		44,282	49.26	50,175	55.82
Registered voters		89,895		89,894	
Source: Ministry of the Interior

=== 2012 ===
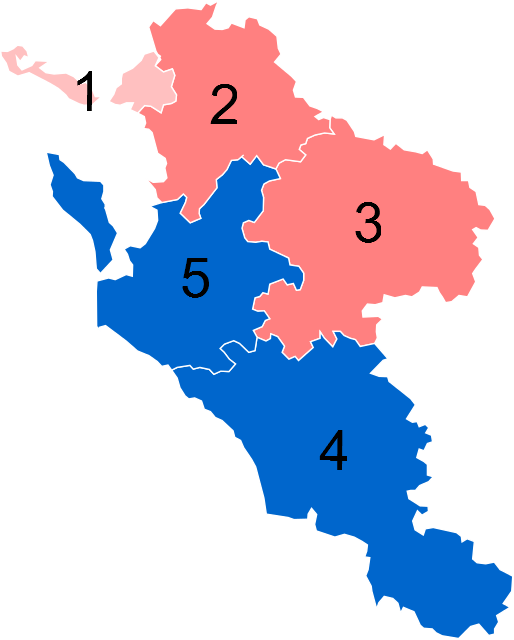
Results in the Charente-Maritime's five constituencies in 2012 : pale pink (Miscellaneous left), pink (PS), blue (UMP)

Summary of the 10 June and 17 June 2012 French legislative election in Charante Maritime’s 4th Constituency
Candidate	Party		1st round		2nd round	
Candidate	Party		Votes	%	Votes	%
Dominique Bussereau	Union for a Popular Movement	UMP	20,485	40.01%	26,740	52.15%
Fabienne Dugas-Raveneau	Socialist Party	PS	18,129	35.41%	24,540	47.85%
Tony Lambert	Front National	FN	6,946	13.57%		
Jean-Yves Boiffier	Left Front	FG	2,168	4.23%		
Jean-Luc Guerbois	Europe Ecology – The Greens	EELV	1,243	2.43%		
Valérie Verduzier	Centrist	CEN	795	1.55%		
Laure Serra	Miscellaneous Right	DVD	524	1.02%		
Martine Gantner	Miscellaneous Right	DVD	379	0.74%		
Valérie Baraud	Far Left	EXG	348	0.68%		
Stéphane Hays	Other	AUT	182	0.36%		
Total			51,199	100%	51,280	100%
Registered voters			87,692		87,675	
Blank/Void ballots			873	1.00%	1,617	1.84%
Turnout			52,072	59.38%	52,897	60.33%
Abstentions			35,620	40.62%	34,778	39.67%
Result					UMP HOLD	

=== 2007 ===
Results of the 10 June and 17 June 2007 French legislative election in Charente Maritime’s 4th Constituency
Party	Candidate	Votes	%	±%
UMP	Dominique Bussereau	26,322	51.73	
PS	Régine Joly	12,161	23.90	
MoDem	Céline Alleaume	3,471	6.82	
FN	Bernard Roy	1,936	3.80	
CPNT	Chantal Thomazeau	1,630	3.20	
Far left	Lino Piva	1,113	2.19	
LV	Danièle Lot	982	1.93	
PCF	Jean-Marc Langlais	923	1.93	
MPF	Séverine Werbrouck	723	1.42	
DVG	Alain Girard	371	0.73	
Far left	Christophe Bruneteau	371	0.73	
DVE	Françoise Doucet	353	0.69	
Independent	Jack Lionet	281	0.55	
DVD	Grégory Couillaud	250	0.49	
Majority		14,161	27.83	
Turnout		52,695	61.42	
UMP hold		Swing		

=== 2002 ===
Legislative Election 2002: Charente-Maritime's 4th constituency
Party	Candidate	Votes	%	±%
UMP	Dominique Bussereau	24,413	47.17	
PRG	Philippe Callaud	11,003	21.26	
FN	Eliane Petrus	5,392	10.42	
CPNT	Gérard Fontenay	3,508	6.78	
LV	Nathalie Riollet	1,679	3.24	
PCF	René Renaudet	1,282	2.48	
DVG	Henri-Georges Dubois	1,145	2.21	
Others	N/A	3,333		
Turnout		53,007	64.75	
2nd round result
UMP	Dominique Bussereau	29,642	62.31	
PRG	Philippe Callaud	17,932	37.69	
Turnout		49,503	60.47	
UMP gain from UDF				

=== 1997 ===
Legislative Election 1997: Charente-Maritime's 4th constituency
Party	Candidate	Votes	%	±%
UDF	Dominique Bussereau	18,514	37.35	
PRG	Philippe Callaud	13,401	27.04	
FN	Hilles Bredillot	6,586	13.29	
PCF	Michelle Carmousse	4,878	9.84	
MPF	Claude Trong	2,534	5.11	
LV	Jack Lionet	2,272	4.58	
MEI	Christophe Bultel	1,382	2.79	
Turnout		53,363	67.73	
2nd round result
UDF	Dominique Bussereau	27,117	51.07	
PRG	Philippe Callaud	25,981	48.93	
Turnout		56,652	71.91	
UDF hold				

== Sources ==
- Notes and portraits of the French MPs under the Fifth Republic, French National Assembly
- 2012 French legislative elections: Charente-Maritime's 4th constituency (first round and run-off), Minister of the Interior
