= Francis Hardy =

Francis Hardy may refer to:

- Francis Hardy (Irish politician)
- Francis Hardy (French politician)
