= Charente-Maritime's 5th constituency =

Constituency of the National Assembly of France

5th constituency of Charente-Maritime
- inline Constituency of the National Assembly of France

- Constituency in department

- Charente-Maritime in France
- Incumbent deputy: Christophe Plassard; H
- Department: Charente-Maritime
- Cantons: Le Château-d'Oléron, Marennes, Royan-Ouest, Saint-Agnant, Saint-Pierre-d'Oléron, Saint-Porchaire, Saujon, Tonnay-Charente, La Tremblade
- Registered voters: 111,434 (2017)

The 5th constituency of Charente-Maritime (French: Cinquième circonscription de la Charente-Maritime) is one of five electoral districts in the department of Charente-Maritime, each of which returns one deputy to the French National Assembly in elections using the two-round system, with a run-off if no candidate receives more than 50% of the vote in the first round.

== Description ==
The constituency is made up of nine (pre-2015) cantons: those of Le Château-d'Oléron, Marennes, Royan-Ouest, Saint-Agnant, Saint-Pierre-d'Oléron, Saint-Porchaire, Saujon, Tonnay-Charente, and La Tremblade.

At the time of the 1999 census (which was the basis for the most recent redrawing of constituency boundaries, carried out in 2010) the 5th constituency had a total population of 112,002.

== Deputies ==
Election	Member	Party
1958	André Lacaze	CNIP
1962	Jean de Lipkowski	UNR
1967	Jean de Lipkowski	UDR
1968	Jean de Lipkowski	UDR
1973	Jean de Lipkowski	UDR
1978	Jean de Lipkowski	RPR
1981	Jean de Lipkowski	RPR
1986	Proportional representation – no election by constituency	
1988	Jean de Lipkowski	RPR
1993	Jean de Lipkowski	RPR
1997	Didier Quentin	RPR
2002	Didier Quentin	UMP
2007	Didier Quentin	UMP
2012	Didier Quentin	UMP
2017	Didier Quentin	LR
2022	Christophe Plassard	H
2024	Christophe Plassard	H

== Election results ==
=== 2024 ===
Candidate	Party	Alliance	First round			Second round		
Candidate	Party	Alliance	Votes	%	+/–	Votes	%	+/–
Aymeric Mongelous	RN		36,296	43.83	+18.07	39,259	47.89	
Christophe Plassard	HOR	ENS	27,134	32.75	+8.92	42,725	52.11	
Anne Brachet	PS	NFP	18,344	22.15	+2.27	WITHDREW		
Danièle Cassette	LO		1,051	1.27	+0.23			
Valid votes			82,815	97.31	-1.05	81,984	95.46	
Blank votes			1,609	1.89	+0.77	2,758	3.21	
Null votes			676	0.79	+0.28	1,128	1.31	
Turnout			85,100	70.74	+19.97	85,870	71.37	
Abstentions			35,196	29.26	-19.97	34,447	28.63	
Registered voters			120,296			120,317		
Source: Ministry of the Interior, Le Monde
Result						HOR HOLD		

=== 2022 ===
Legislative Election 2022: Charente-Maritime's 5th constituency
Party	Candidate	Votes	%	±%
RN	Séverine Werbrouck	15,404	25.76	+10.23
HOR (Ensemble)	Christophe Plassard	14,245	23.83	N/A
PS (NUPÉS)	Margarita Sola	11,886	19.88	−6.21
LR (UDC)	Didier Quentin	10,519	17.59	−6.19
REC	Florence Courtois	2,474	4.14	N/A
DIV	Romuald Dequatre	1,525	2.55	N/A
PRG	Marie-Noëlle Groch	1,506	2.52	N/A
Others	N/A	2,228	3.73	
Turnout		59,787	50.77	+0.94
2nd round result
HOR (Ensemble)	Christophe Plassard	28,233	51.74	N/A
RN	Séverine Werbrouck	26,336	48.26	N/A
Turnout		54,569	49.69	+6.70
HOR gain from LR				

=== 2017 ===
Candidate	Label	First round		Second round	
Candidate	Label	Votes	%	Votes	%
Didier Quentin	LR	12,933	23.78	23,151	54.89
Gérard Potennec	DIV	11,415	20.99	19,024	45.11
Séverine Werbrouck	FN	8,444	15.53		
Mickaël Vallet	PS	7,355	13.52		
Geoffrey Lebreton Perez	FI	4,936	9.08		
Christian Gerin	DIV	3,509	6.45		
Stéphanie Muzard	ECO	1,327	2.44		
Thierry Gille	DIV	1,206	2.22		
Maurice Montangon	DLF	863	1.59		
Jacques Guiard	PCF	569	1.05		
Stéphane Theas	ECO	444	0.82		
Audrey Jean	DIV	396	0.73		
Béatrice Machillot	DIV	234	0.43		
Khamssa Rahmani	EXG	229	0.42		
Pierre Duponchel	DIV	214	0.39		
Julien Millot	DIV	208	0.38		
Patrice Guillory	DIV	67	0.12		
Gilles Geirnaert	DVG	36	0.07		
Rémi Lefèvre	DIV	2	0.00		
Votes		54,387	100.00	42,175	100.00
Valid votes		54,387	97.93	42,175	88.03
Blank votes		782	1.41	3,919	8.18
Null votes		370	0.67	1,816	3.79
Turnout		55,539	49.83	47,910	42.99
Abstentions		55,914	50.17	63,524	57.01
Registered voters		111,453		111,434	
Source: Ministry of the Interior

=== 2012 ===
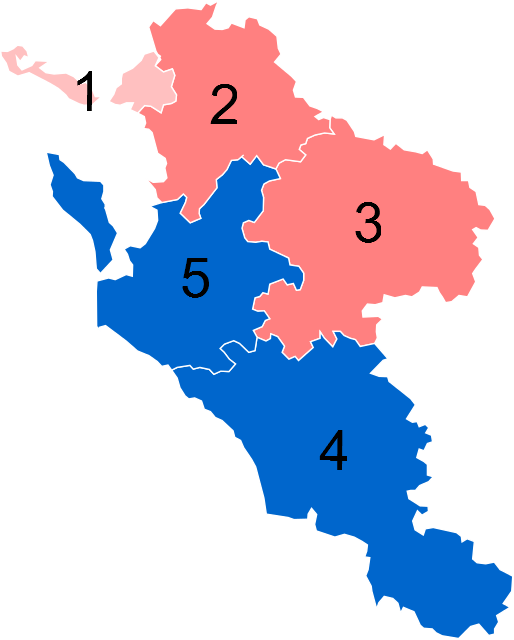
Results in the Charente-Maritime's five constituencies in 2012 : pale pink (Miscellaneous left), pink (PS), blue (UMP)

Summary of the 10 June and 17 June 2012 French legislative election in Charante Maritime’s 5th Constituency
Candidate	Party		1st round		2nd round	
Candidate	Party		Votes	%	Votes	%
Didier Quentin	Union for a Popular Movement	UMP	25,925	41.68%	32,697	53.99%
Pascal Ferchaud	Radical Party of the Left	PRG	21,637	34.79%	27,866	46.01%
Jean-Marc de Lacoste Lareymondie	Front National	FN	8,769	14.10%		
Jacques Guiard	Left Front	FG	2,340	3.76%		
Laurence Marcillaud	Europe Ecology – The Greens	EELV	1,272	2.05%		
Michel Renault	Centrist	CEN	957	1.54%		
Sylvie Moreau	Ecologist	ECO	608	0.98%		
Pascale Lequeux	Ecologist	ECO	361	0.58%		
Anne Bernon	Far Left	EXG	327	0.53%		
Total			62,196	100%	60,563	100%
Registered voters			106,006		105,996	
Blank/Void ballots			811	0.77%	1,604	1.51%
Turnout			63,007	59.44%	62,167	58.65%
Abstentions			42,999	40.56%	43,829	41.35%
Result					UMP HOLD	

=== 2007 ===
Results of the 10 June and 17 June 2007 French legislative election in Charente Maritime’s 5th Constituency
Party	Candidate	Votes	%	±%
UMP	Didier Quentin	31,884	53.51	
PRG	Vincent Barraud	10,798	18.12	
MoDem	Alexis Blanc	4,790	8.04	
FN	Elise Somprou	2,345	3.94	
CPNT	Jean-Louis Jaulin	1,993	3.34	
LV	Nicole Kentzel	1,983	3.33	
Far left	Marie Dolores Delgado	1,803	3.03	
PCF	Jacques Guiard	1,647	2.76	
MPF	Claude Meunier	1,142	1.92	
Independent	Patrick Vaisse	637	1.07	
Far left	Marouani Ben Hadj Salem	383	0.64	
Independent	Alain Ignacimouttou	185	0.31	
Majority		21,086	35.39	
Turnout		60,808	60.52	
UMP hold		Swing		

=== 2002 ===
Legislative Election 2002: Charente-Maritime's 5th constituency
Party	Candidate	Votes	%	±%
UMP	Didier Quentin	27,560	48.33	
PS	Régine Joly	12,794	22.43	
FN	Didier Fontaine	6,063	10.63	
CPNT	Olivier Delabbey	3,519	6.17	
LV	Eric Chollon	2,213	3.88	
PCF	Jacques Guiard	1,368	2.40	
Others	N/A	3,512		
Turnout		58,135	64.83	
2nd round result
UMP	Didier Quentin	33,340	64.76	
PS	Régine Joly	18,144	35.24	
Turnout		53,568	59.74	
UMP hold				

=== 1997 ===
Legislative Election 1997: Charente-Maritime's 5th constituency
Party	Candidate	Votes	%	±%
RPR	Didier Quentin	13,663	27.03	
PS	Claude Billot-Zeller	12,238	24.21	
FN	Pascal Markowski	6,688	13.23	
RPR	Jean-Noël de Lipkowski	6,514	12.89	
PCF	Jacques Guiard	4,177	8.26	
MPF	Claude Meunier	3,424	6.77	
LV	Réjane Grué	2,421	4.79	
MEI	Paul Liénart	1,415	2.80	
Turnout		53,721	65.90	
2nd round result
RPR	Didier Quentin	29,964	55.37	
PS	Claude Billot-Zeller	24,153	44.63	
Turnout		57,819	70.93	
RPR hold				

== Sources ==
- Notes and portraits of the French MPs under the Fifth Republic, French National Assembly
- 2012 French legislative elections: Charente-Maritime's 5th constituency (first round and run-off), Minister of the Interior
