= Vandré, Charente-Maritime =

Vandré
- Part of La Devise
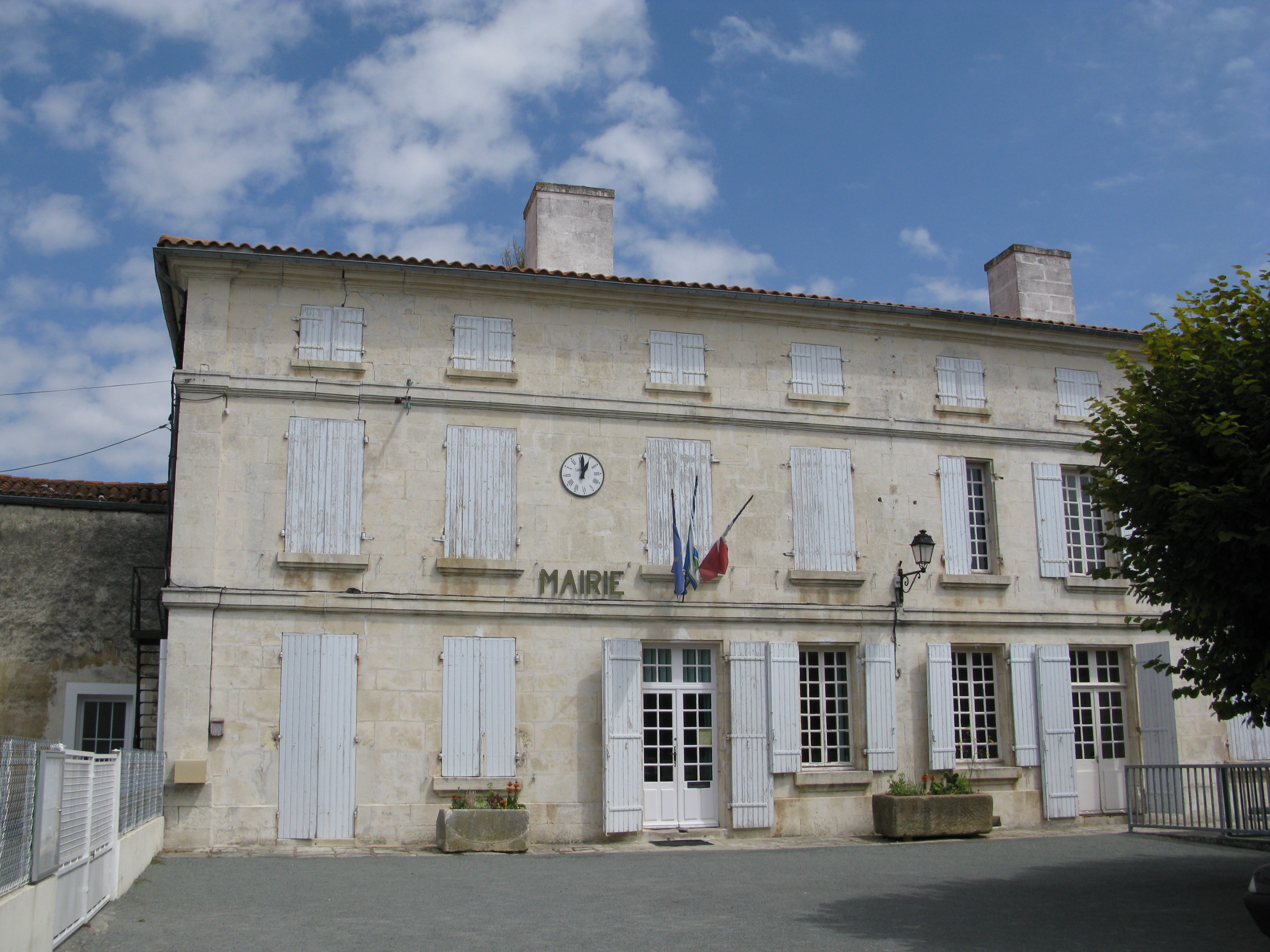
- Town hall
- Location of Vandré
- Location within France Location within Nouvelle-Aquitaine
- Coordinates: 46°03′23″N 0°45′50″W
- Country: France
- Region: Nouvelle-Aquitaine
- Department: Charente-Maritime
- Arrondissement: Rochefort
- Canton: Surgères
- Commune: La Devise
- Area^{1}: 14.57 km^{2} (5.63 sq mi)
- Elevation: 15 m (49 ft)
- Highest elevation: 42 m (138 ft)
- Lowest elevation: 6 m (20 ft)
- Population (2019): 898
  - Density: 61.6/km^{2} (160/sq mi)
- Time zone: UTC+01:00 (CET)
  - Summer (DST): UTC+02:00 (CEST)
- Postal code: 17700
- ^{1} French Land Register data, which excludes lakes, ponds, glaciers > 1 km^{2} (0.386 sq mi or 247 acres) and river estuaries.

Vandré (French pronunciation: [vɑ̃dʁe]) is a former commune in the Charente-Maritime department in southwestern France. On 1 January 2018, it was merged into the new commune of La Devise.

== Population ==
Historical population
Year	Pop.	±% p.a.
1962	564	—
1968	602	+1.09%
1975	646	+1.01%
1982	678	+0.69%
1990	745	+1.18%
1999	725	−0.30%
2006	732	+0.14%
2019	898	+1.58%
Source: EHESS and INSEE (2019)

== See also ==
- Communes of the Charente-Maritime department
