= La Devise =

- Commune
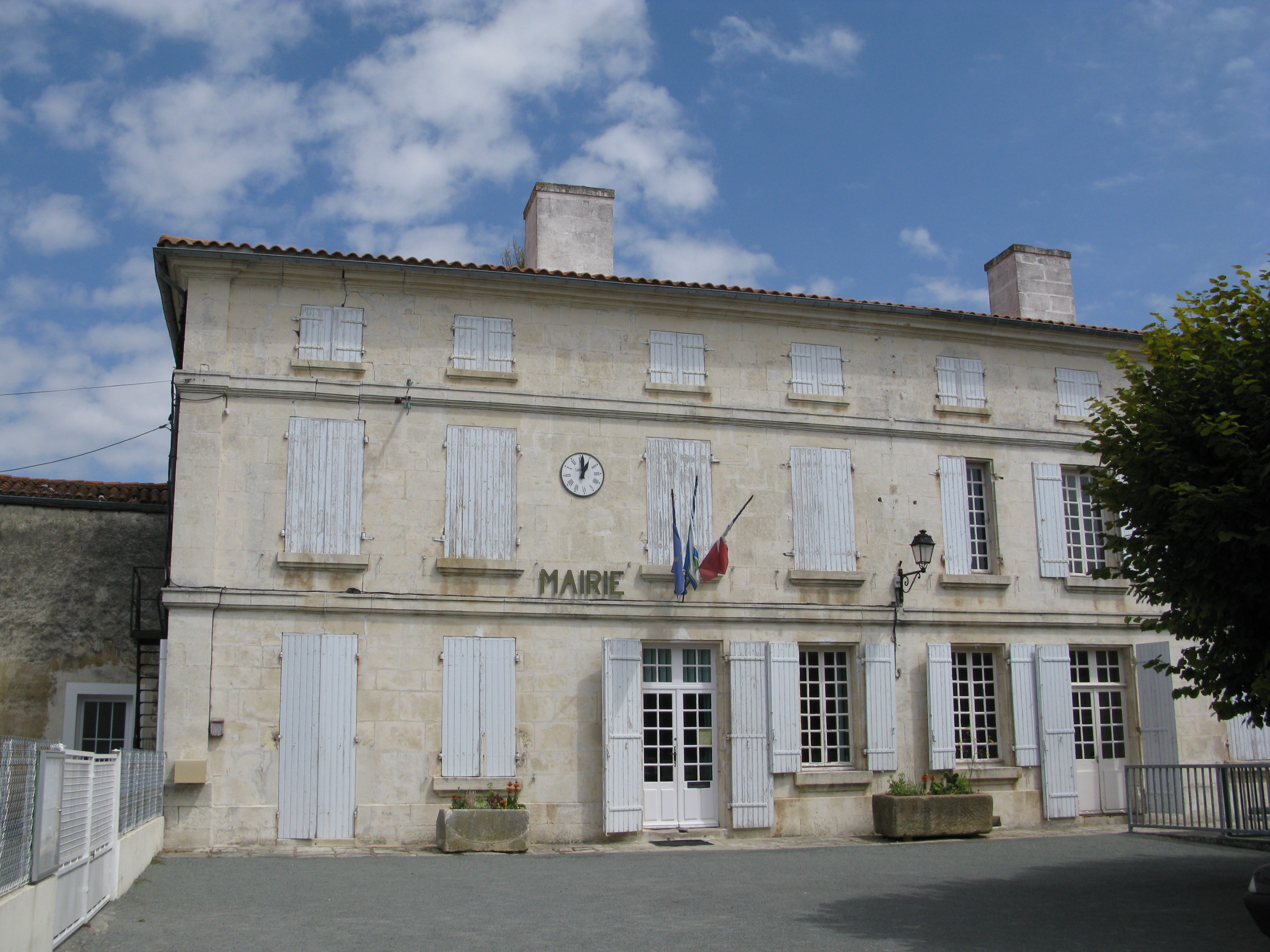
- The town hall in Vandré
- Location of La Devise
- Location within France Location within Nouvelle-Aquitaine
- Coordinates: 46°03′23″N 0°45′50″W
- Country: France
- Region: Nouvelle-Aquitaine
- Department: Charente-Maritime
- Arrondissement: Rochefort
- Canton: Saint-Jean-d'Angély
- Intercommunality: Aunis Sud
- Area^{1}: 26.83 km^{2} (10.36 sq mi)
- Population (2023): 1,183
  - Density: 44.09/km^{2} (114.2/sq mi)
- Time zone: UTC+01:00 (CET)
  - Summer (DST): UTC+02:00 (CEST)
- INSEE/Postal code: 17457 /17380, 17700
- ^{1} French Land Register data, which excludes lakes, ponds, glaciers > 1 km^{2} (0.386 sq mi or 247 acres) and river estuaries.

La Devise (French pronunciation: [la dəviz]) is a commune in the department of Charente-Maritime, southwestern France. The municipality was established on 1 January 2018 by the merger of the former communes of Vandré (the seat), Chervettes and Saint-Laurent-de-la-Barrière.

== See also ==
- Communes of the Charente-Maritime department
