= Didier Quentin =

French politician

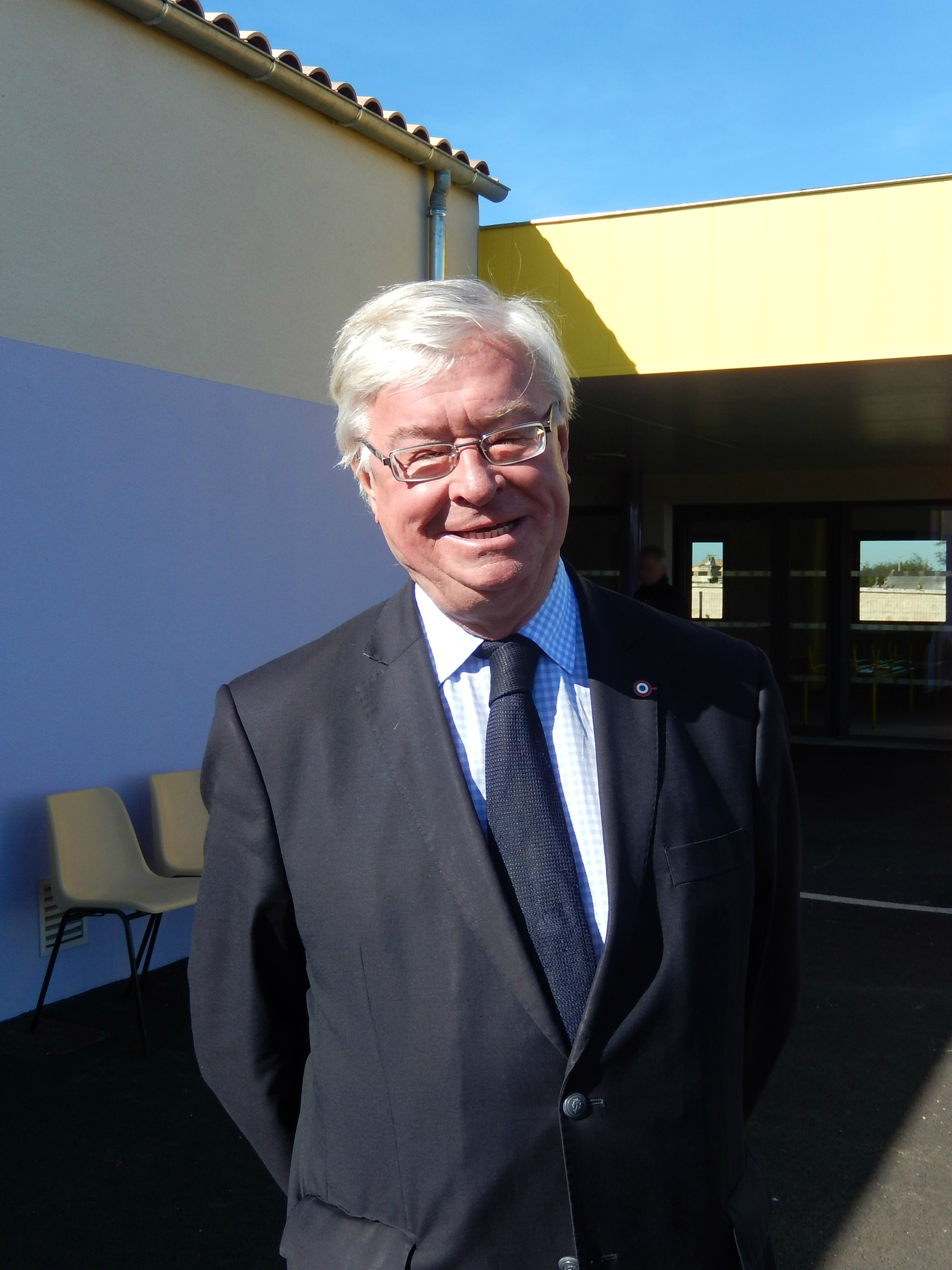
- Quentin in October 7, 2017

Member of the Parliament
- In office 1 June 1997 – June 2022
- Preceded by: Jean de Lipkowski
- Constituency: Charente-Maritime (5th)

Mayor of Royan
- Incumbent
- Assumed office 9 March 2008
- Preceded by: Henri Le Gueut

Vice-President of the Charente-Maritime's General Council
- In office 28 March 1994 – 16 March 2008

General councillor
- In office 28 March 1994 – 16 March 2008
- Preceded by: Henri Drouet
- Succeeded by: Robert Chatelier
- Constituency: Saint-Agnant

Vice-president of the Poitou-Charentes Regional Council
- In office 23 March 1992 – 1 August 1997

Regional councillor
- In office 23 March 1992 – 1 August 1997
- Constituency: Charente-Maritime

Personal details
- Born: 23 December 1946 (age 79) Royan (17)
- Party: LR; UMP
- Education: Institut d'études politiques de Bordeaux; Institut d'Études Politiques de Paris; École nationale d'administration
- Profession: Plenipotentiary minister
- Website: http://www.didierquentin.com

Didier Quentin (born 23 December 1946 in Royan, Charente-Maritime) is a French politician and a member of the Republicans (LR).

A mayor of Royan since 2008, he has been an MP of the Charente-Maritime's 5th constituency since 1997. He was a vice-president of the Charente-Maritime's General Council between 1994 and 2008 and a vice-president of the Poitou-Charentes Regional Council between 1992 and 1997.

He lost his seat in the first round of the 2022 French legislative election.

== Political mandates ==
=== National mandate ===
- MP of the Charente-Maritime's 5th constituency (since 1 June 1997) : member of the committee of laws, vice-president of the committee of the European Affairs, president of the friendship group France/Japan, vice-president of the friendship group France/Senegal

=== Local mandate ===
- Mayor of Royan : since 9 March 2008

=== Former local mandates ===
- General councillor of Saint-Agnant: 28 March 1994 – 16 March 2008
- Vice-President of the Charente-Maritime's General Council: 28 March 1994 – 16 March 2008
- Regional councillor of Poitou-Charentes: 23 March 1992- 1 August 1997
- Vice-President of the Poitou-Charentes Regional Council: 23 March 1992 – 1 August 1997
