= Puy-du-Lac =

- Commune
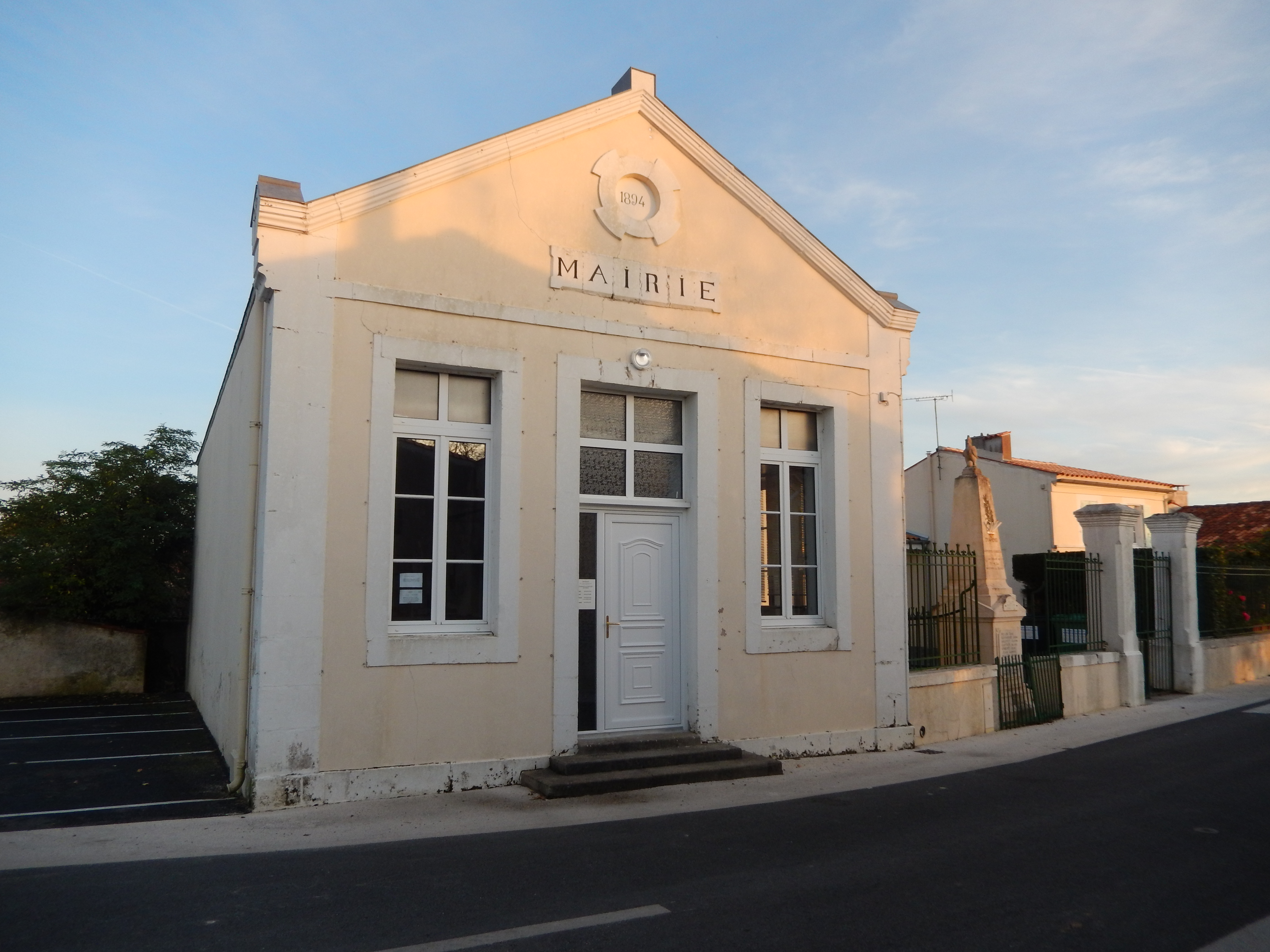
- The town hall in Puy-du-Lac
- Location of Puy-du-Lac
- Location within France Location within Nouvelle-Aquitaine
- Coordinates: 45°57′07″N 0°45′09″W
- Country: France
- Region: Nouvelle-Aquitaine
- Department: Charente-Maritime
- Arrondissement: Saint-Jean-d'Angély
- Canton: Saint-Jean-d'Angély

Government
  - Mayor (2020–2026): Valérie Floch-Ruju
- Area^{1}: 14.6 km^{2} (5.6 sq mi)
- Elevation: 11 m (36 ft)
- Highest elevation: 28 m (92 ft)
- Lowest elevation: 1 m (3.3 ft)
- Population (2023): 523
  - Density: 35.8/km^{2} (92.8/sq mi)
- Time zone: UTC+01:00 (CET)
  - Summer (DST): UTC+02:00 (CEST)
- INSEE/Postal code: 17292 /17380
- ^{1} French Land Register data, which excludes lakes, ponds, glaciers > 1 km^{2} (0.386 sq mi or 247 acres) and river estuaries.

Puy-du-Lac (French pronunciation: [pɥi dy lak]) is a commune in the Charente-Maritime department in the Nouvelle-Aquitaine region in southwestern France.

== Geography ==
The river Boutonne forms the commune's southeastern and southern borders.

== Population ==
Historical population
Year	Pop.	±% p.a.
1968	272	—
1975	209	−3.69%
1982	206	−0.21%
1990	248	+2.35%
1999	280	+1.36%
2007	363	+3.30%
2012	453	+4.53%
2017	487	+1.46%
2023	523	+1.20%
Source: INSEE

== See also ==
- Communes of the Charente-Maritime department
