= Raphaël Gérard =

French politician

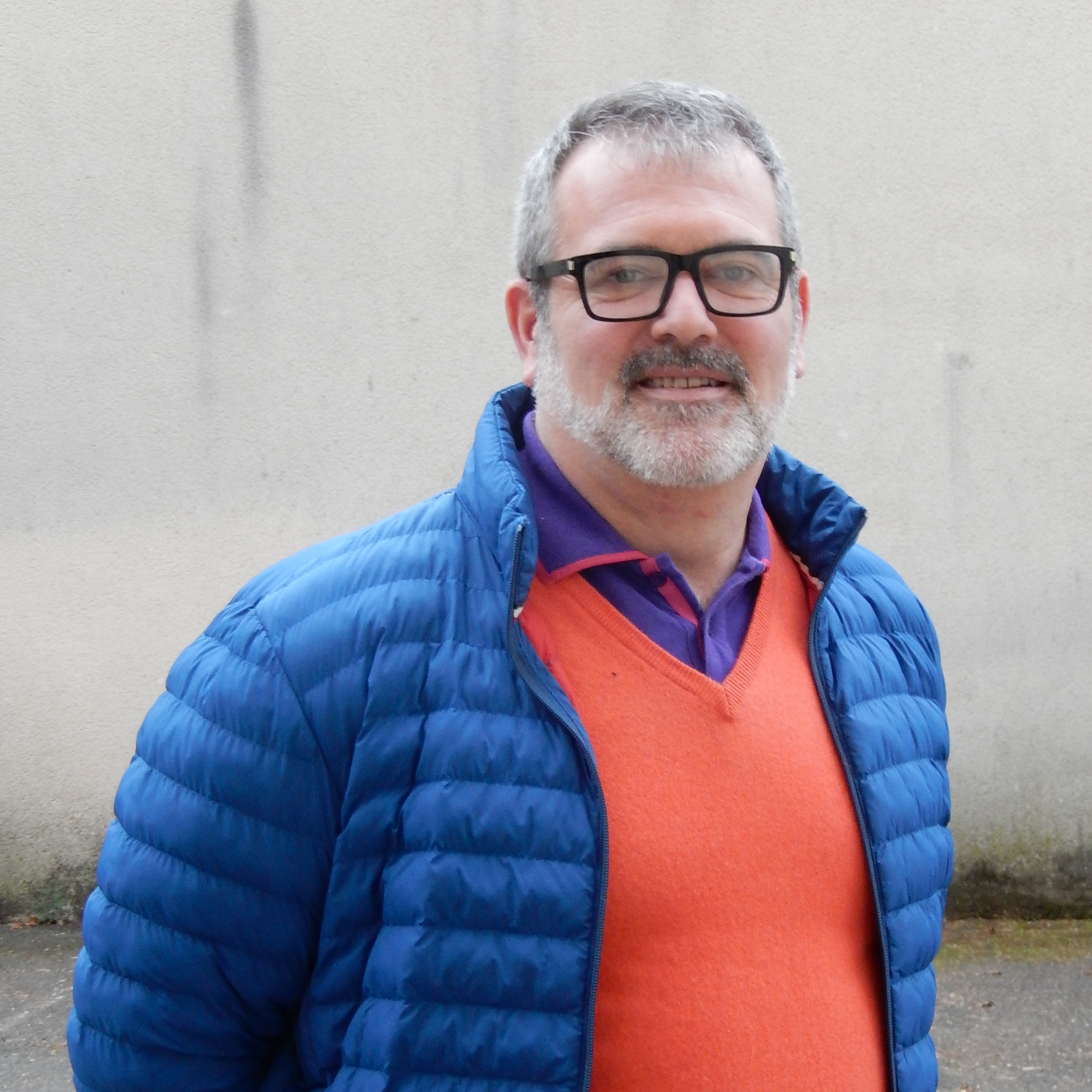

Member of the National Assembly for Charente-Maritime's 4th constituency
- In office 21 June 2017 – 21 June 2024
- Preceded by: Dominique Bussereau
- Succeeded by: Pascal Markowsky

Personal details
- Born: 17 October 1968 Cirey-sur-Vezouze, France
- Died: 15 November 2026 (aged 58)
- Party: Renaissance
- Education: École du Louvre

Raphaël Gérard (French pronunciation: [ʁafaɛl ʒeʁaʁ]; 17 October 1968 – 15 November 2026) was a French politician of Renaissance (RE) who has been a member of the French National Assembly from 2017 to 2024, where he represented the 4th constituency of Charente-Maritime.

== Early life and education ==
In 1992, Gérard obtained his diploma in Art History at the École du Louvre, with a specialty in ancient and Christian iconography, then a year later in Museology. In 2002, he took over the management of the Musée de Montmartre in Paris, where he produced several major exhibitions, such as a first retrospective devoted to Théophile Alexandre Steinlen in 2005. In 2006, he joined the LVMH group and the heritage department of the Louis Vuitton trunk maker where he was responsible for international exhibitions.

In 2012, Gérard moved to the south of Charente-Maritime, in Lonzac, and became responsible for the heritage and cultural activities of Hennessy. He eventually became mayor of Lonzac in 2026.

== Member of the National Assembly ==
On 18 June 2017, during the 2017 legislative election, Gérard was elected in the 4th constituency of Charente-Maritime by obtaining 51.29% of votes in the second round against the LR 's candidat.

In the National Assembly, Gérard served on the Commission for Cultural Affairs and Education. In addition to his committee assignments, he chaired the Heritage Study group and the France-Indonesia Friendship Group. He was also Vice-Président of the Discrimination and LGBT-phobias worldwide's Study group.

Gérard was re-elected in the 2022 election, then lost his seat to Rassemblement National opponent Pascal Markowsky in the 2024 snap election.

== Political positions ==
In July 2019, Gérard voted in favor of the French ratification of the European Union’s Comprehensive Economic and Trade Agreement (CETA) with Canada.

== Personal life ==
Gérard is married. On 20 June 2018, on the occasion of the presentation of his report on the fight against anti-LGBT discrimination in Overseas, came out publicly as gay.

On 12 March 2020, Gérard tested positive for COVID-19. On 14 March 2020, he was placed in intensive care.

He died from flu on 15 November 2026.

== See also ==
- 2017 French legislative election
