= Jean-Claude Beaulieu =

French politician

Jean-Claude Beaulieu (French pronunciation: [ʒɑ̃ klod boljø]; born 24 June 1944 in Payroux) is a member of the National Assembly of France. He represents the Charente-Maritime department, and is a member of the Union for a Popular Movement.
