= Nachamps =

- Commune
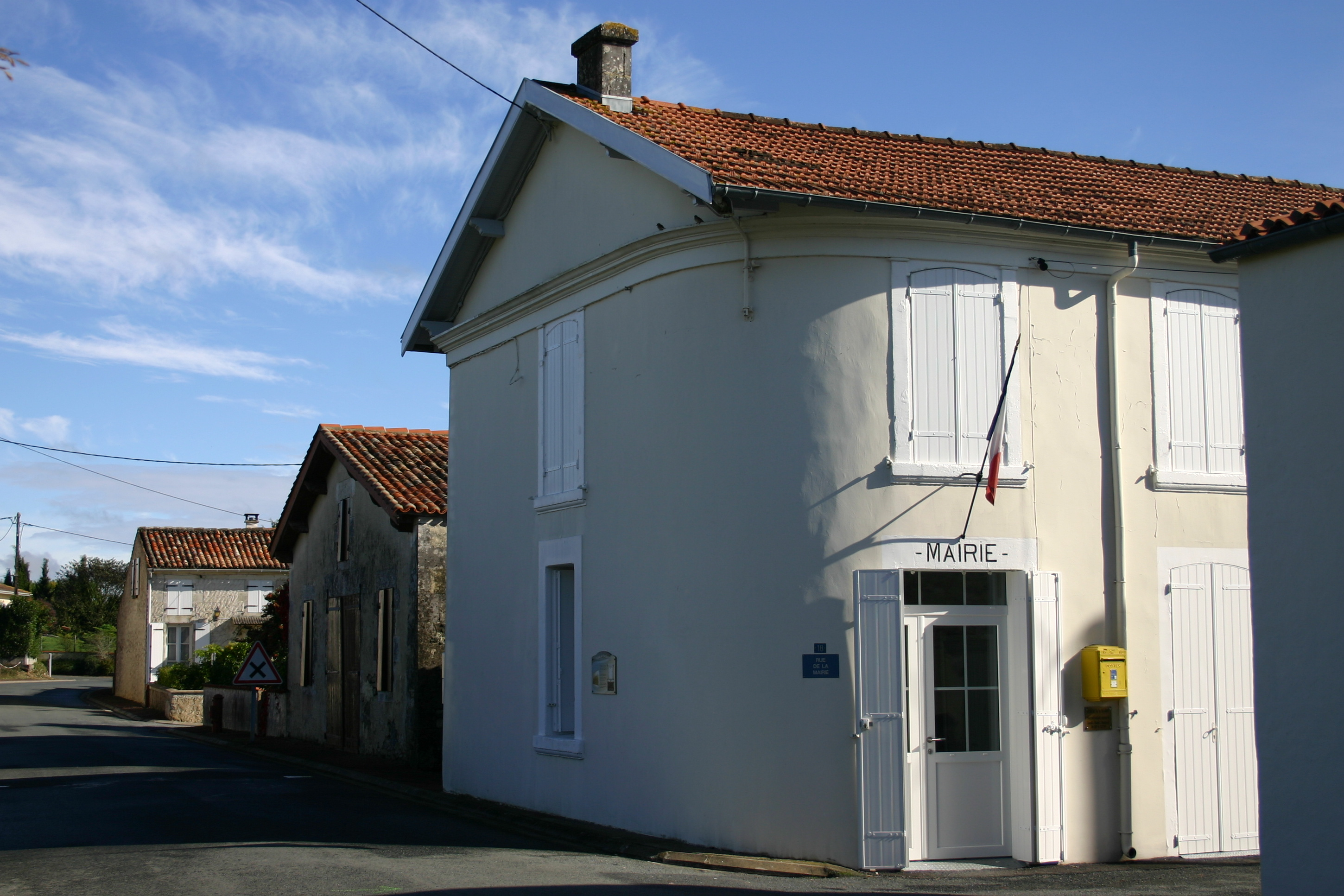
- The town hall in Nachamps
- Location of Nachamps
- Location within France Location within Nouvelle-Aquitaine
- Coordinates: 46°01′07″N 0°37′26″W
- Country: France
- Region: Nouvelle-Aquitaine
- Department: Charente-Maritime
- Arrondissement: Saint-Jean-d'Angély
- Canton: Saint-Jean-d'Angély
- Intercommunality: Vals de Saintonge Communauté

Government
  - Mayor (2024–2026): Annie Hillairet
- Area^{1}: 4.18 km^{2} (1.61 sq mi)
- Elevation: 25 m (82 ft)
- Highest elevation: 66 m (217 ft)
- Lowest elevation: 7 m (23 ft)
- Population (2023): 206
  - Density: 49.3/km^{2} (128/sq mi)
- Time zone: UTC+01:00 (CET)
  - Summer (DST): UTC+02:00 (CEST)
- INSEE/Postal code: 17254 /17380
- ^{1} French Land Register data, which excludes lakes, ponds, glaciers > 1 km^{2} (0.386 sq mi or 247 acres) and river estuaries.

Nachamps (French pronunciation: [naʃɑ̃]) is a commune in the Charente-Maritime department in the Nouvelle-Aquitaine region in southwestern France.

== Population ==
Historical population
Year	Pop.	±% p.a.
1968	180	—
1975	172	−0.65%
1982	201	+2.25%
1990	190	−0.70%
1999	211	+1.17%
2007	219	+0.47%
2012	197	−2.10%
2017	194	−0.31%
2023	206	+1.01%
Source: INSEE

== Sights ==
The commune features certain rural characteristics, the church named Saint Nicolas, the fountain which recently renovated with the source of water from the mill.

== See also ==
- Communes of the Charente-Maritime department
