= Jean-Philippe Ardouin =

French politician

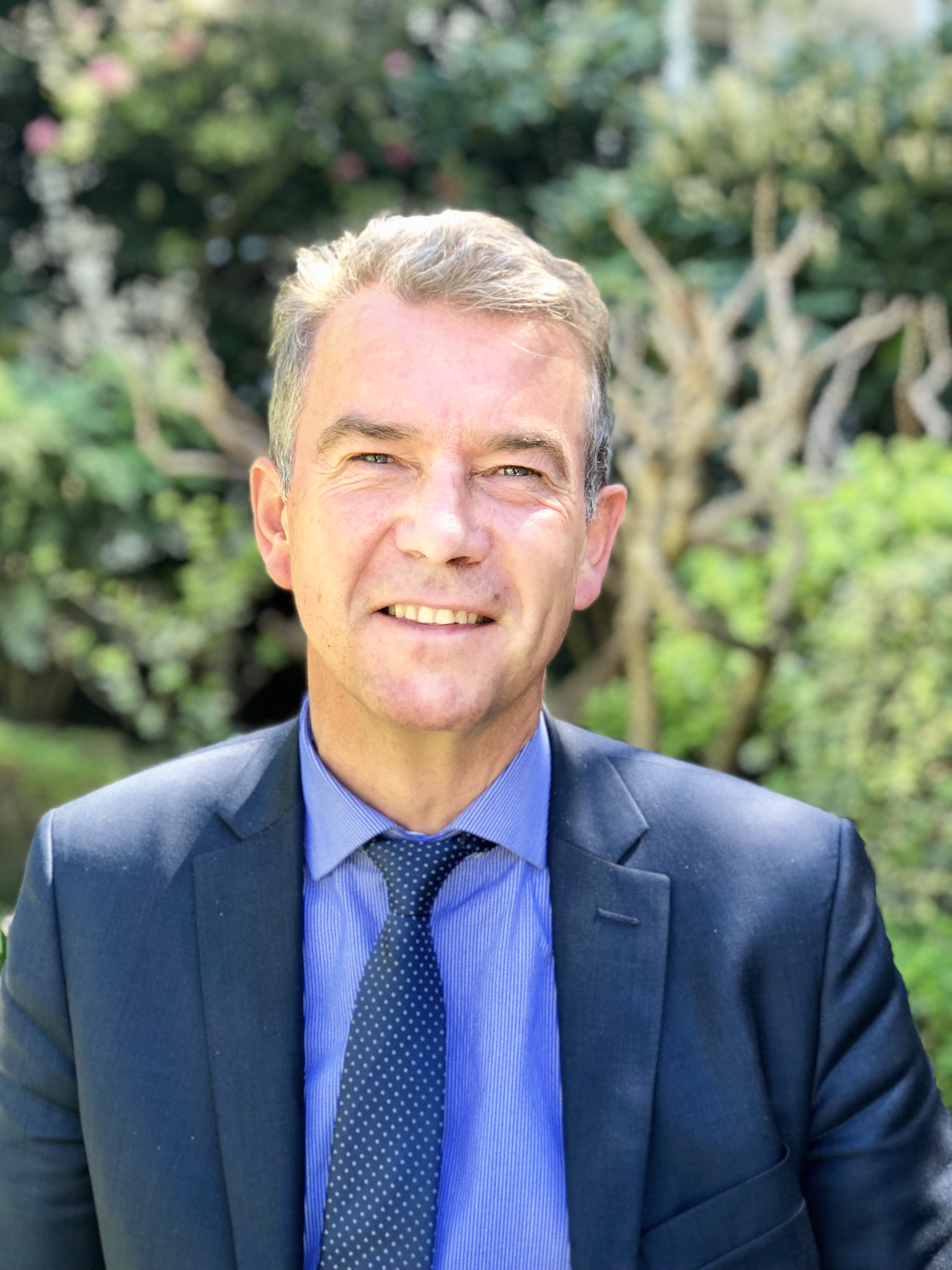

Member of the National Assembly for Charente-Maritime's 3rd constituency
- In office 21 June 2017 – 9 June 2024
- Preceded by: Catherine Quéré
- Succeeded by: Fabrice Barusseau

Personal details
- Born: 5 March 1964 (age 62) Saintes, Charente-Maritime, France
- Party: Renaissance
- Education: University of Bordeaux

Jean-Philippe Ardouin (born 5 March 1964) is a French politician of Renaissance (RE) who was a member of the French National Assembly from the 2017 elections to 2024, representing the department of Charente-Maritime.

He was re-elected in the 2022 elections. In the 2024 French legislative election, he was unseated when he withdrew to avoid a triangular election in the second round.

In parliament, Ardouin served as member of the Defence Committee. In addition to his committee assignments, he is part of the French-Indonesian Parliamentary Friendship Group.

== Biography ==
After completing his secondary education at Lycée Bellevue in Saintes, Charente-Maritime, Jean-Philippe Ardouin pursued higher education in Bordeaux, where he earned several postgraduate degrees in management sciences, economics, and business administration from IAE Bordeaux I, as well as a postgraduate degree in law, economics, and management of the wine industry from the University of Bordeaux IV. A former executive in the wine industry, he is the owner of a cognac estate in Tesson and a bank director. He is involved in Rotary International, where he is president of the Rotary Club of Saint-Jean-d'Angély. A former member of the Bureau National Interprofessionnel du Cognac (BNIC), he is presented by some local newspapers as one of the deputies of Cognac.

In 2017, he was elected Renaissance (French political party) deputy for the third constituency of Charente-Maritime after two attempts in 2002 and 2007 under the banner of the UDF and then the Democratic Movement (France).

== See also ==
- 2017 French legislative election
- 2022 French legislative election
