= Departmental Council of Charente-Maritime =

Departmental legislature in France

Departmental Council of Charente-Maritime Conseil départemental de la Charente-Maritime

Leadership
- President: Sylvie Marcilly, DVD since 1 July 2021

Structure
- Seats: 54
- Political groups: Government (31): DVD (18); LR (9); UDI (2); MoDem (1); PR (1); Opposition (23): DVG (13); PRG (4); PS (3); LÉ (2); PP (1); la.charente-maritime.fr

The Departmental Council of Charente-Maritime (French: Conseil départemental de la Charente-Maritime) is the deliberative assembly of the Charente-Maritime department in the region of Nouvelle-Aquitaine. It consists of 54 members (general councilors) from 27 cantons.

The President of the General Council is Sylvie Marcilly.

== Vice-Presidents ==
The President of the Departmental Council is assisted by 15 vice-presidents chosen from among the departmental advisers. Each of them has a delegation of authority.

List of vice-presidents of the Charente-Maritime Departmental Council (as of 2021)
Order	Name	Party	Canton	Delegation
1st	Loïc Girard	DVD	Saintonge Estuaire	Finance, general administration, evaluation of public policies and territorial solidarity
2nd	Catherine Desprez	DVC	Surgères	Culture, mobility, airport and port areas
3rd	Michel Doublet	UD	Saint-Porchaire	Infrastructures and aid to communities
4th	Chantal Guimberteau	DVD	Jonzac	Human resources
5th	Stéphane Villain	DVD	Châtelaillon-Plage	Sport, tourism, communication and events
6th	Françoise de Roffignac	DVD	Saintonge Estuaire	Policy on water, environment, sea and coast
7th	Alexandre Grenot	DVD	Thénac	Youth and citizenship
8th	Sylvie Mercier	DVD	Thénac	Digital planning and inclusion
9th	Jean-Claude Godineau	UD	Saint-Jean-d'Angély	Autonomy
10th	Dominique Rabelle	DVD	Île d'Oléron	Housing, integration and social action
11th	Gilles Gay	DVC	Surgères	Agriculture, land and forestry development
12th	Caroline Aloé	UD	Saint-Jean-d'Angély	Education and colleges
13th	Christophe Cabri	DVD	Jonzac	International affairs
14th	Véronique Abelin-Drapron	UC	Saintes	Heritage
15th	Stéphane Chedouteaud	DVD	Matha	Sensitive natural spaces and nature escapes

== See also ==
- Charente-Maritime
- General councils of France
