= Francis Hardy (French politician) =

French politician (1923–2021)

Deputy in the French National Assembly
- In office 1973–1981
- In office 1986–1988

General Councillor of the Canton of Cognac-Sud
- In office 1973–1976

General Councillor of the Canton of Cognac-Nord
- In office 1985–1992

Mayor of Cognac
- In office 1979–2001
- Preceded by: Alain Filiol de Raimond
- Succeeded by: Jérôme Mouhot

Member of the Poitou-Charentes Regional Council

Personal details
- Born: 14 December 1923 Cognac, France
- Died: 11 March 2021 (aged 97)
- Party: UDF; RPR

Francis Hardy (14 December 1923 – 11 March 2021) was a French politician.

== Biography ==
Prior to his political career, Hardy played rugby for US Cognac and subsequently became president of the club. He lived in Cognac and was President of Hardy Cognac SA, his family's business. As Mayor of Cognac, he installed a library and an art museum. He served in the National Assembly from 1973 to 1981 and again from 1986 to 1988. He served as General Councillor of the now-defunct Canton of Cognac-Sud and Canton of Cognac-Nord. He served on the Poitou-Charentes Regional Council, where he served as president from 1978 to 1980. In the 2014 French municipal elections, he supported Noël Belliot for Mayor of Cognac.

Francis Hardy died on 11 March 2021 at the age of 97.

== Bibliography ==
- Cognac, ma vie, ma ville (2010)
