= Pascal Markowsky =

French politician

Member of the National Assembly of France for Charente-Maritime's 4th constituency
- Incumbent
- Assumed office 8 July 2024
- Preceded by: Raphaël Gérard

Personal details
- Born: 22 July 1954 (age 71) Valenciennes, France
- Political party: National Rally
- Spouse: Séverine Werbrouck

Pascal Markowsky (born 22 July 1954) is a French politician of the National Rally. He was elected to the National assembly of France in the 2024 French legislative election.

== Biography ==
Markowsky was born in the North of France as the grandson of a Polish miner. Markowsky was a soldier, then a restaurateur before making a career as a business manager in printing.

Committed to the National Front since the 1980s, he was elected to the Poitou-Charentes Regional Council in 1992, and sits on the Regional Council of Nouvelle-Aquitaine.

He also sits as an opposition municipal councilor for Saint-Georges-d'Oléron.

In 2022, he stood in the legislative elections for Charente-Maritime's 4th constituency but lost to Raphaël Gérard.

In 2024 he succeeded in the second round with 50.74% of the votes cast against the outgoing deputy, i.e. a difference of 909 votes.

He is married to the Member of the European Parliament and departmental delegate of the RN in Charente-Maritime Séverine Werbrouck.

According to the newspaper Les Jours, Pascal Markowsky, along with fourteen other deputies of the National Rally, would have frequented a conversation group on Facebook containing racist remarks and calls for murder. He would have remained a member from 2017 to 2024.

== See also ==
- List of deputies of the 17th National Assembly of France
