= Séverine Werbrouck =

French politician (born 1970)

Séverine Werbrouck MEP

Member of the European Parliament for France
- Incumbent
- Assumed office 27 September 2024

Personal details
- Born: 31 October 1970 (age 55)
- Party: National Rally
- Other political affiliations: Patriots for Europe
- Spouse: Pascal Markowsky

Séverine Werbrouck (born 31 October 1970) is a French politician of the National Rally who was elected member of the European Parliament in 2024. She previously served in the Regional Council of Nouvelle-Aquitaine and in the municipal council of Saint-Pierre-d'Oléron. In the 2007 French legislative election, she was a candidate of the Movement for France in Charente-Maritime's 4th constituency, and in the 2017 and 2022 legislative elections, she was a candidate for Charente-Maritime's 5th constituency. She is the wife of Pascal Markowsky, who was elected to the National Assembly in 2024.
