= Saint-Laurent-de-la-Barrière =

- Part of La Devise
- Location of Saint-Laurent-de-la-Barrière
- Location within France Location within Nouvelle-Aquitaine
- Coordinates: 46°02′10″N 0°42′01″W
- Country: France
- Region: Nouvelle-Aquitaine
- Department: Charente-Maritime
- Arrondissement: Rochefort
- Canton: Saint-Jean-d'Angély
- Commune: La Devise
- Area^{1}: 8.28 km^{2} (3.20 sq mi)
- Elevation: 22 m (72 ft)
- Highest elevation: 45 m (148 ft)
- Lowest elevation: 9 m (30 ft)
- Population (2019): 111
  - Density: 13.4/km^{2} (34.7/sq mi)
- Time zone: UTC+01:00 (CET)
  - Summer (DST): UTC+02:00 (CEST)
- Postal code: 17280
- ^{1} French Land Register data, which excludes lakes, ponds, glaciers > 1 km^{2} (0.386 sq mi or 247 acres) and river estuaries.

Saint-Laurent-de-la-Barrière (French pronunciation: [sɛ̃ loʁɑ̃ də la baʁjɛʁ]) is a former commune in the Charente-Maritime department in the Nouvelle-Aquitaine region in southwestern France. On 1 January 2018, it was merged into the new commune of La Devise.

== See also ==
- Communes of the Charente-Maritime department
