= Fabrice Barusseau =

French politician (born 1970)

Member of the National Assembly for Charente-Maritime's 3rd constituency
- Incumbent
- Assumed office 8 July 2024
- Preceded by: Jean-Philippe Ardouin

Personal details
- Born: 1 June 1970 (age 56) Saintes, Charente-Maritime, France
- Party: Socialist

Fabrice Barusseau (born 1 June 1970) is a French politician who is a member of the Socialist Party. In the 2024 French legislative election, he was elected deputy for Charente-Maritime's 3rd constituency.

== Biography ==
Fabrice Barusseau was born in Saintes, and spent most of his childhood in Saint-Jean-d'Angély.

A technology teacher, he holds various local offices. Since 2014, he has been mayor of the commune of Villars-les-Bois. He has also been a departmental councillor for the canton of Chaniers since 2015, as well as vice-president of the Saintes urban community, responsible for water management.

He was elected deputy in the early legislative elections of 2024.

== See also ==
- List of deputies of the 17th National Assembly of France
