= Saint-Crépin, Charente-Maritime =

Saint-Crépin
- Commune
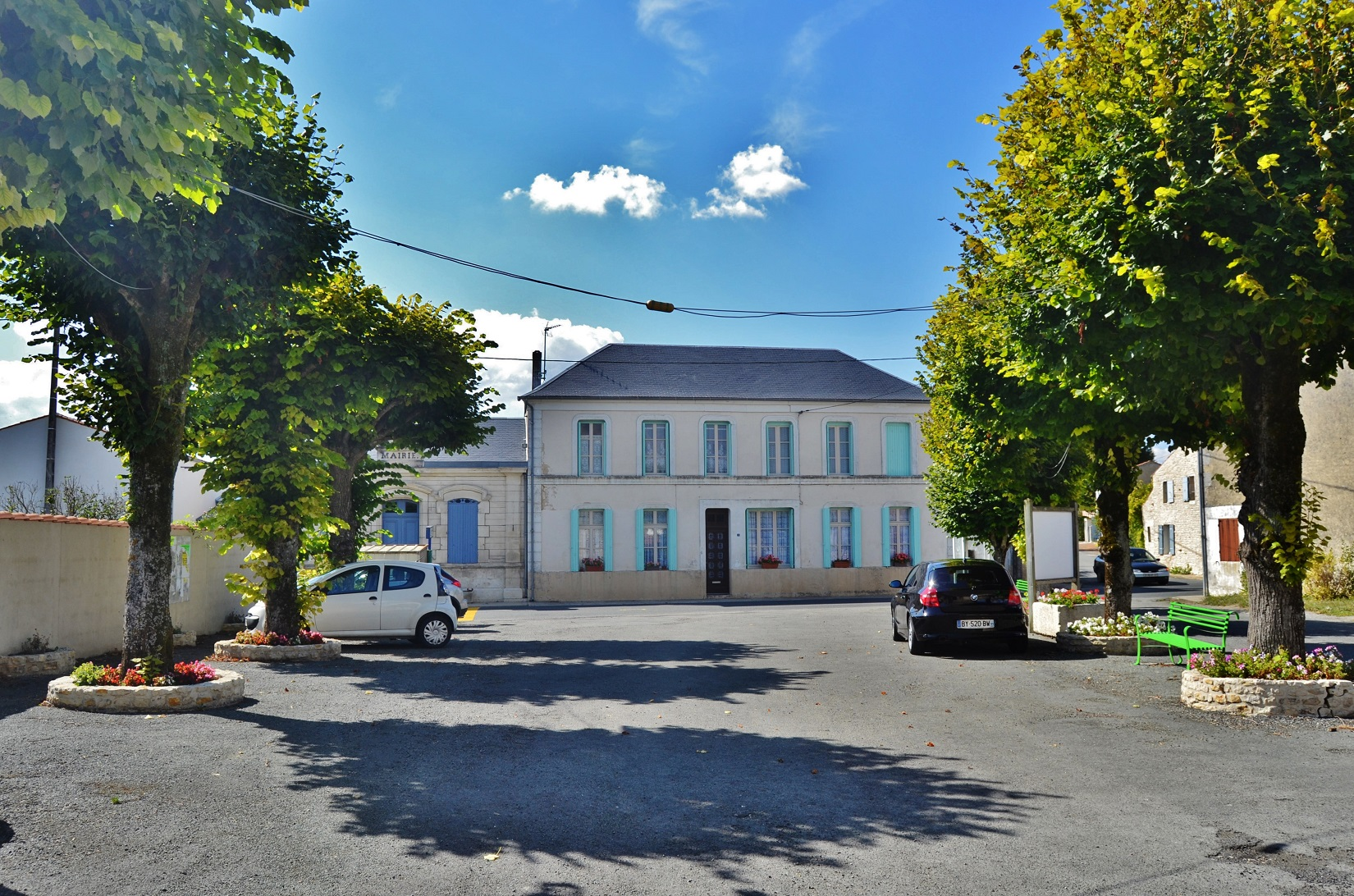
- The town hall in Saint-Crépin

- Coat of arms
- Location of Saint-Crépin
- Location within France Location within Nouvelle-Aquitaine
- Coordinates: 46°00′14″N 0°43′55″W
- Country: France
- Region: Nouvelle-Aquitaine
- Department: Charente-Maritime
- Arrondissement: Rochefort
- Canton: Saint-Jean-d'Angély

Government
  - Mayor (2020–2026): Matthieu Cadot
- Area^{1}: 13.94 km^{2} (5.38 sq mi)
- Elevation: 40 m (130 ft)
- Highest elevation: 65 m (213 ft)
- Lowest elevation: 1 m (3.3 ft)
- Population (2023): 340
  - Density: 24/km^{2} (63/sq mi)
- Time zone: UTC+01:00 (CET)
  - Summer (DST): UTC+02:00 (CEST)
- INSEE/Postal code: 17321 /17380
- ^{1} French Land Register data, which excludes lakes, ponds, glaciers > 1 km^{2} (0.386 sq mi or 247 acres) and river estuaries.

Saint-Crépin (French pronunciation: [sɛ̃ kʁepɛ̃]) is a commune in the Charente-Maritime department in the Nouvelle-Aquitaine region in southwestern France.

== Population ==
Historical population
Year	Pop.	±% p.a.
1968	247	—
1975	235	−0.71%
1982	226	−0.56%
1990	237	+0.60%
1999	217	−0.97%
2007	250	+1.79%
2012	302	+3.85%
2017	347	+2.82%
2023	340	−0.34%
Source: INSEE

== See also ==
- Communes of the Charente-Maritime department
