= La Jard =

- Commune
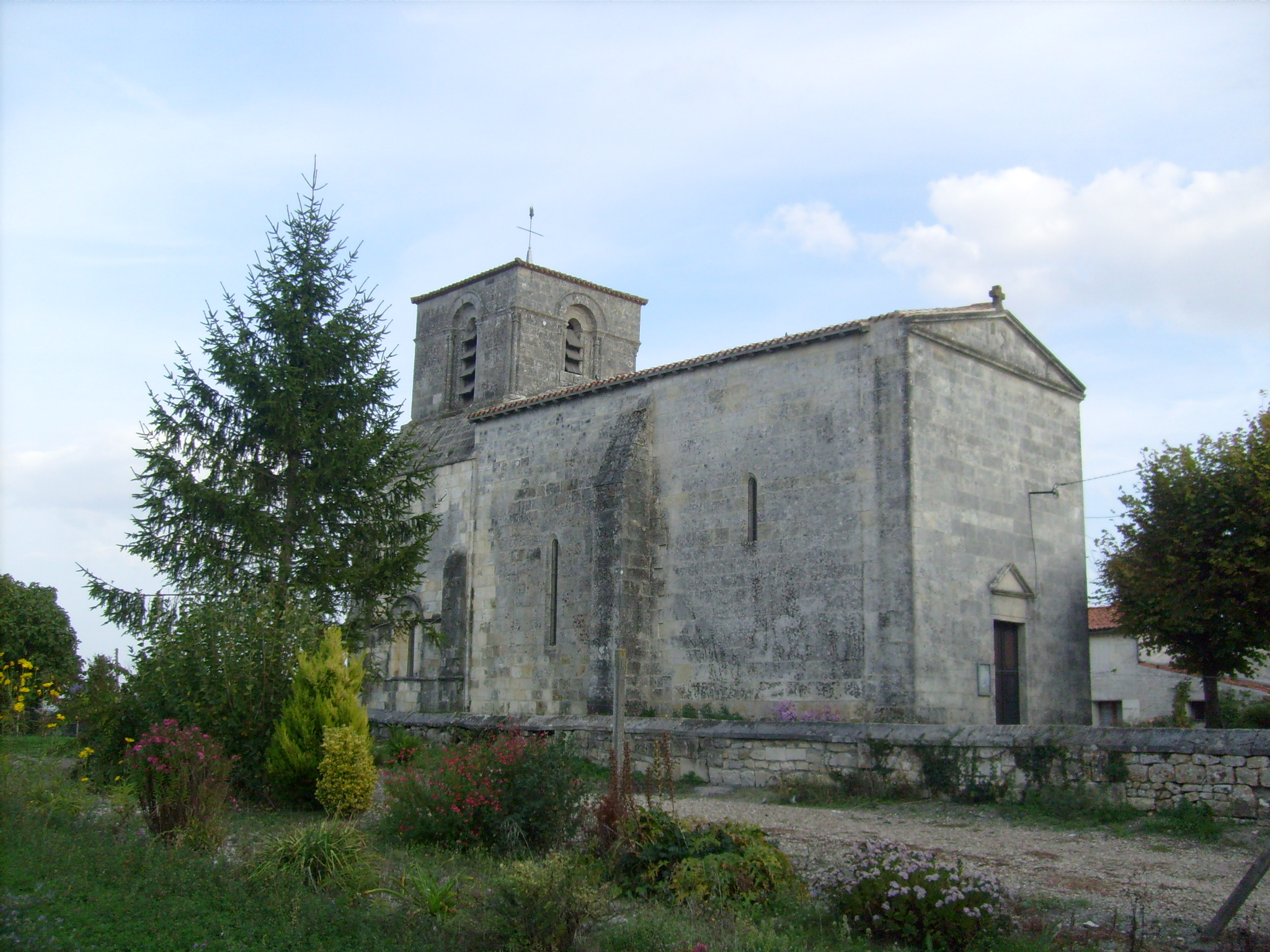
- The church in La Jard
- Location of La Jard
- Location within France Location within Nouvelle-Aquitaine
- Coordinates: 45°39′19″N 0°35′05″W
- Country: France
- Region: Nouvelle-Aquitaine
- Department: Charente-Maritime
- Arrondissement: Saintes
- Canton: Thénac
- Intercommunality: CA Saintes

Government
  - Mayor (2020–2026): Jérôme Gardelle
- Area^{1}: 8.48 km^{2} (3.27 sq mi)
- Elevation: 40 m (130 ft)
- Highest elevation: 48 m (157 ft)
- Lowest elevation: 6 m (20 ft)
- Population (2023): 426
  - Density: 50.2/km^{2} (130/sq mi)
- Time zone: UTC+01:00 (CET)
  - Summer (DST): UTC+02:00 (CEST)
- INSEE/Postal code: 17191 /17460
- ^{1} French Land Register data, which excludes lakes, ponds, glaciers > 1 km^{2} (0.386 sq mi or 247 acres) and river estuaries.

La Jard (French pronunciation: [la ʒaʁ]) is a commune in the Charente-Maritime department in southwestern France.

== Population ==
Historical population
Year	Pop.	±% p.a.
1968	237	—
1975	207	−1.91%
1982	198	−0.63%
1990	259	+3.41%
1999	275	+0.67%
2007	301	+1.14%
2012	346	+2.83%
2017	422	+4.05%
2023	426	+0.16%
Source: INSEE

== Geography ==
The river Seugne forms most of the commune's northeastern border.

== See also ==
- Communes of the Charente-Maritime department
