= Chervettes =

- Part of La Devise
- Location of Chervettes
- Location within France Location within Nouvelle-Aquitaine
- Coordinates: 46°03′08″N 0°42′24″W
- Country: France
- Region: Nouvelle-Aquitaine
- Department: Charente-Maritime
- Arrondissement: Rochefort
- Canton: Saint-Jean-d'Angély
- Commune: La Devise
- Area^{1}: 3.98 km^{2} (1.54 sq mi)
- Elevation: 25 m (82 ft)
- Highest elevation: 32 m (105 ft)
- Lowest elevation: 13 m (43 ft)
- Population (2019): 182
  - Density: 45.7/km^{2} (118/sq mi)
- Time zone: UTC+01:00 (CET)
  - Summer (DST): UTC+02:00 (CEST)
- Postal code: 17380
- ^{1} French Land Register data, which excludes lakes, ponds, glaciers > 1 km^{2} (0.386 sq mi or 247 acres) and river estuaries.

Chervettes (French pronunciation: [ʃɛʁvɛt]) is a former commune in the Charente-Maritime department in the Nouvelle-Aquitaine region in southwestern France. On 1 January 2018, it was merged into the new commune of La Devise.

== Geography ==
The commune was located between Surgères and Tonnay-Boutonne.

== History ==
An old viticultural commune, Chervettes was marked by old viticultural properties with enclosed courtyards. Since the outbreak of phylloxera at the end of the 19th century, the commune subsisted three small areas of winery. The church known as Notre-Dame-de-l’Assumption was first constructed in the 15th century. Around the commune, Chiron features an 18th-century built mill.

== See also ==
- Communes of the Charente-Maritime department
