= Xavier de Roux =

French politician

Member of the French National Assembly for Charente-Maritime
- In office 2002–2007

Personal details
- Born: 4 December 1940 Boulogne-Billancourt, France
- Died: 5 June 2015 (aged 74) Paris, France
- Party: UMP
- Profession: Lawyer

Xavier de Roux (French: [ɡzavje də ʁu]; 4 December 1940 – 5 June 2015) was a French politician.

He was a member of the Radical Party and a deputy for the department Charente-Maritime in the National Assembly of France from 1993 until 1997 and from 2002 until 2007. From 1983 until his death in 2015 he was the elected mayor of Chaniers, a small town in Charente-Maritime.
