= Regional Council of Poitou-Charentes =

The Regional Council of Poitou-Charentes was the regional council of the French region of Poitou-Charentes until 2015. It included 55 members.

== Seats ==
=== By Department ===
- 18 councillors for Charente-Maritime
- 14 councillors for Vienne
- 12 councillors for Charente
- 11 councillors for Deux-Sèvres

=== By party ===
Party		seats
•	Socialist Party	20
	Union for a Popular Movement	8
•	French Communist Party	7
•	The Greens	6
	Miscellaneous Right	6
	National Front	3
•	Left Radical Party	2
•	Miscellaneous Left	2
	Union for French Democracy	1

== Elections ==
=== 2004 ===
Candidate	Party	Votes (Round One)	% (Round One)	Votes (Round Two)	% (Round Two)
Ségolène Royal	PS-PRG-PCF-Verts	350,466	46.29%	448,950	55.10%
Élisabeth Morin	UMP-UDF-MPF	249,373	32.93%	294,959	36.20%
Jean-Romée Charbonneau	FN	79,484	10.50%	70,898	8.70%
Gérard Fontenay	CPNT	43,645	5.76%	-	-
Claude Quemar	LO/LCR	34,221	4.52%	-	-
Total		757,189	100.00%	814,807	100.00%

== Past Regional Councils ==
=== 1998 ===
Party		seats
	Socialist Party	14
•	Union for French Democracy	10
•	Rally for the Republic	10
	French Communist Party	4
	The Greens	3
	National Front	5
•	Hunting, Fishing, Nature, Traditions	2
•	Miscellaneous Right	2
	Miscellaneous Left	2
	Left Radical Party	1
•	Movement for France	1

=== 1992 ===
Party		seats
•	Rally for the Republic-Union for French Democracy	24
	Socialist Party	13
	National Front	5
	The Greens	4
	Ecology Generation	3
	French Communist Party	3
•	Hunting, Fishing, Nature, Traditions	2
•	Miscellaneous Right	1

=== 1986 ===
Party		seats
•	Rally for the Republic-Union for French Democracy	28
	Socialist Party	21
	French Communist Party	3
	National Front	1

=== Past Presidents ===
- Lucien Grand (1974–1976)
- Jacques Fouchier (1976–1978)
- Francis Hardy (1978–1980)
- Fernand Chaussebourg (1980–1981)
- Michel Boucher (1981–1982)
- Jacques Santrot (1982)
- Raoul Cartraud (1982–1985)
- René Monory (1985–1986)
- Louis Fruchard (1986–1988)
- Jean-Pierre Raffarin (1988–2002)
- Dominique de la Martinière (2002)
- Élisabeth Morin (2002–2004)
- Ségolène Royal (2004-)
