= Darniche =

Darniche is a surname. Notable people with the surname include:

- Bernard Darniche (born 1942), French rally driver
- Philippe Darniche (born 1943), French politician
