= 1992 French Maastricht Treaty referendum =

- 20 September 1992
- Do you approve of the bill submitted to the French people by the President of the Republic authorizing the ratification of the Treaty on the European Union

Results
Choice	Votes	%
Yes	13,162,992	51.05%
No	12,623,582	48.95%
Valid votes	25,786,574	96.59%
Invalid or blank votes	909,377	3.41%
Total votes	26,695,951	100.00%
Registered voters/turnout	38,305,534	69.69%
- Results by département Yes: Over 60% 55 to 60% 50 to 55% No: Over 55% 50 to 55%

A referendum on the Maastricht Treaty for the founding of the European Union was held in France on 20 September 1992. It was approved by 51% of the voters. The result of the referendum, known as the "petit oui", along with the Danish "No" vote (50,7%) are considered to be signals of a transition of public opinion on European integration, away from the "permissive consensus" which had existed in most member states until then. From this point forward issues relating to European integration were subject to more intensive discussions across much of Europe, and later overt euroscepticism gained prominence. Only France, Ireland and Denmark held referendums on the Maastricht Treaty ratification.

== Parties' stances ==
The center-left Socialist party (PS), then in power, as well as the center-right Union for French Democracy (UDF) campaigned in favor of the treaty. Jacques Chirac, then Mayor of Paris and leader of the Gaullist RPR party, also took a pro-European stance, partly in the hopes to boost his chances for the next Presidential election.

On the other side, the Euroskeptic faction of the Rally for the Republic (RPR), dissented from its leader and heralded the "no" vote. Communists also opposed what they considered as an advance of neo-liberalism. Jean-Marie Le Pen's Front National was also strongly opposed to any integration.

The Trotskyites from Lutte Ouvrière called for an abstention.

Support:

- Socialist party (PS)
- Union for French Democracy (UDF)

Opponents:

- left-wing:
  - Jean-Pierre Chevènement
  - French Communist Party (PCF)
  - Revolutionary Communist League (LCR)
- right-wing:
  - major figures in the Gaullist Rally for the Republic (RPR) including Philippe Séguin and Charles Pasqua (but not leader Jacques Chirac, and the then-lesser known Nicolas Sarkozy and François Fillon)
  - Philippe de Villiers
  - National Front

Abstain:

- Workers' Struggle (LO) (Arlette Laguiller was quoted as saying "A 'no' vote is a vote for Le Pen")

Those who opposed the ratification also included demographer Emmanuel Todd, on the basis of his work on European anthropology, arguing that differences between cultures would be too strong for a common currency to work.

== Campaign ==
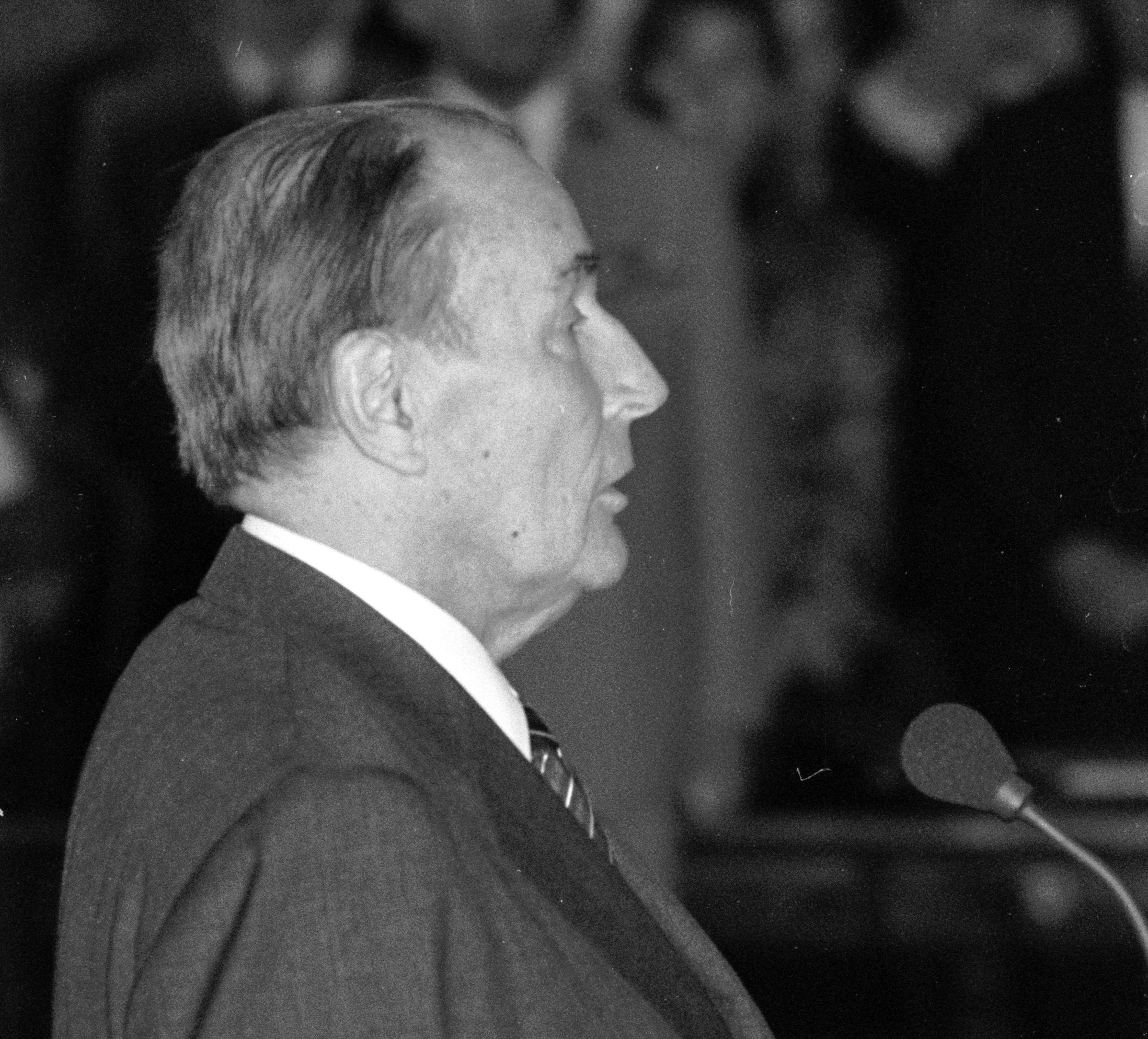
François Mitterrand

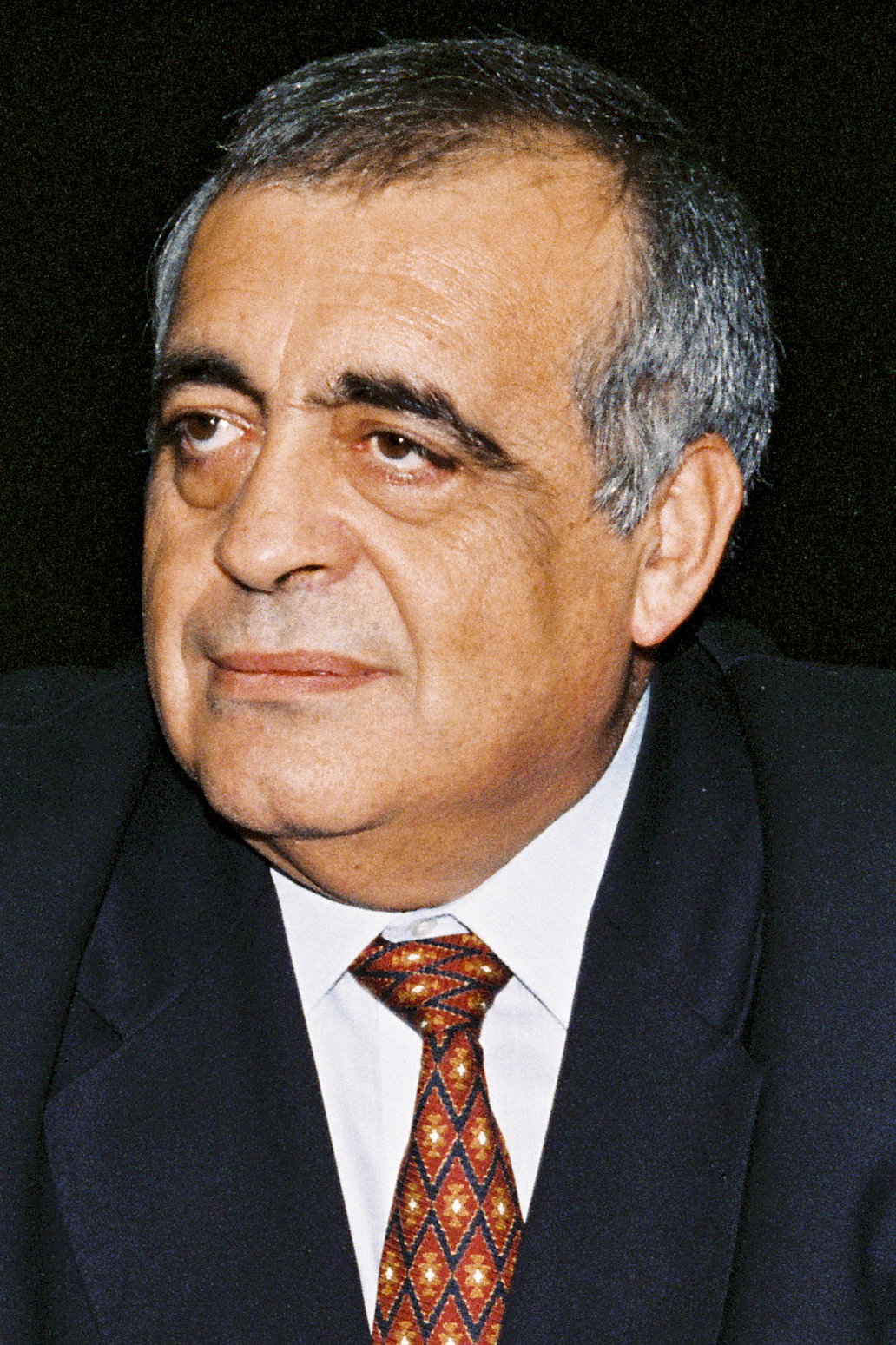
Philippe Séguin

The introduction of a common currency was the most debated aspect of the campaign. The three major right-wing figures campaigning against it, Philippe Séguin, Charles Pasqua and Philippe de Villiers, often named souverainists, were arguing that it would be a blow to French monetary independence, and political sovereignty as a whole. Séguin and de Villiers were coming from the top school for senior civil service, the ÉNA, just like left-wing dissenter Jean-Pierre Chevènement.

The sovereignist campaign gained an unexpected momentum, beating the 'yes' vote in some polls.

Philippe Séguin and President François Mitterrand famously faced off in a passionate but nevertheless respectful television debate, also remembered for the fact that Mitterrand was in the midst of a cancer treatment, something hidden from the public at the time.

== Results ==
Choice	Votes	%
For	13,162,992	51.05
Against	12,623,582	48.95
Total	25,786,574	100.00
Valid votes	25,786,574	96.59
Invalid/blank votes	909,377	3.41
Total votes	26,695,951	100.00
Registered voters/turnout	38,305,534	69.69
Source: Nohlen & Stöver

=== By department ===
Department	For	Against	Electorate	Votes	Valid	Invalid
Paris	461,435	276,684	1,104,904	752,945	738,119	14,826
Seine-et-Marne	215,408	225,813	639,006	452,808	441,221	11,587
Yvelines	321,932	239,186	784,033	573,159	561,118	12,041
Essonne	248,708	207,831	646,038	468,088	456,539	11,549
Hauts-de-Seine	305,862	233,911	786,433	551,610	539,773	11,837
Seine-Saint-Denis	195,190	232,288	668,049	438,695	427,478	11,217
Val-de Marne	232,655	221,938	669,725	465,636	454,593	11,043
Val-de Oise	205,522	193,243	578,196	408,431	398,765	9,666
Ardennes	63,221	64,825	190,636	132,190	128,046	4,144
Aube	57,009	72,340	187,946	133,700	129,349	4,351
Marne	117,001	111,766	354,255	235,534	228,767	6,767
Haute-Marne	46,968	51,310	145,827	101,890	98,278	3,612
Aisne	112,218	146,948	366,176	267,327	259,166	8,161
Oise	147,359	185,988	460,412	342,826	333,347	9,479
Somme	114,959	165,007	382,372	289,143	279,966	9,177
Eure	105,984	139,016	340,222	252,271	245,000	7,271
Seine-Maritime	255,606	304,597	804,903	579,069	560,203	18,866
Cher	66,327	87,160	224,543	159,793	153,487	6,306
Eure-et-Loir	84,982	101,161	260,179	192,238	186,143	6,095
Indre	55,318	69,968	178,558	131,592	125,286	6,306
Indre-et-Loire	118,876	127,497	352,403	255,339	246,373	8,966
Loir-et-Cher	71,879	86,902	219,506	165,362	158,781	6,581
Loiret	127,627	141,132	372,594	278,387	268,759	9,628
Calvados	146,454	146,938	420,624	301,987	293,392	8,595
Manche	114,956	125,606	340,972	248,699	240,562	8,137
Orne	72,445	77,249	209,401	155,201	149,694	5,507
Côte-d'Or	104,510	110,492	313,432	221,372	215,002	6,370
Nièvre	58,524	60,671	173,634	123,760	119,195	4,565
Saône-et-Loire	128,134	124,614	391,991	264,890	252,748	12,142
Yonne	70,524	84,992	221,876	160,563	155,516	5,047
Nord	519,195	613,949	1,640,563	1,175,412	1,133,144	42,268
Pas-de-Calais	296,221	411,838	998,937	737,659	708,059	29,600
Meurthe-et-Moselle	167,761	138,331	463,533	315,383	306,092	9,291
Meuse	50,983	44,940	139,529	99,341	95,923	3,418
Moselle	254,719	191,014	679,500	460,121	445,733	14,388
Vosges	90,450	97,799	274,683	196,843	188,249	8,594
Bas-Rhin	290,786	133,148	624,637	437,305	423,934	13,371
Haut-Rhin	186,958	117,603	443,172	314,621	304,561	10,060
Doubs	115,991	102,579	311,004	225,642	218,570	7,072
Jura	63,242	58,483	173,072	126,614	121,725	4,889
Haute-Saône	53,469	63,796	166,854	122,218	117,265	4,953
Territoire de Belfort	26,966	31,391	85,552	60,615	58,357	2,258
Loire-Atlantique	281,704	214,036	725,314	513,628	495,740	17,888
Maine-et-Loire	182,420	144,934	472,178	343,259	327,354	15,905
Mayenne	74,138	66,651	200,733	148,817	140,789	8,028
Sarthe	122,176	126,247	367,876	260,195	248,423	11,772
Vendée	133,497	135,099	377,547	282,340	268,596	13,744
Côtes-d'Armor	176,140	116,467	414,780	304,556	292,607	11,949
Finistère	254,910	173,951	615,753	442,893	428,861	14,032
Ille-et-Vilaine	237,588	140,987	552,921	394,185	378,575	15,610
Morbihan	179,253	137,045	453,406	329,455	316,298	13,157
Charente	85,714	85,698	249,912	178,676	171,412	7,264
Charente Maritime	125,376	133,445	381,953	267,897	258,821	9,076
Deux-Sèvres	92,780	81,924	253,269	183,983	174,704	9,279
Vienne	94,987	94,561	271,606	198,334	189,548	8,786
Dordogne	94,168	124,708	301,258	228,258	218,876	9,382
Gironde	270,255	280,025	782,205	565,450	550,280	15,170
Landes	89,763	78,226	237,683	174,798	167,989	6,809
Lot-et-Garonne	73,673	84,910	222,311	165,231	158,583	6,648
Pyrénées-Atlantiques	153,841	134,141	419,228	298,343	287,982	10,361
Ariège	37,057	36,583	107,131	76,649	73,640	3,009
Aveyron	82,594	64,738	212,082	156,762	147,332	9,430
Haute-Garonne	227,375	195,238	609,195	437,702	422,613	15,089
Gers	47,857	48,630	136,741	100,931	96,487	4,444
Lot	46,309	41,780	122,197	92,554	88,089	4,465
Hautes-Pyrénées	60,651	57,431	171,127	122,529	118,082	4,447
Tarn	87,319	91,835	253,595	189,039	179,154	9,885
Tarn-et-Garonne	47,490	59,056	147,460	111,219	106,546	4,673
Corrèze	59,893	70,930	183,878	136,655	130,823	5,832
Creuse	30,272	39,606	107,930	73,213	69,878	3,335
Haute-Vienne	87,879	93,437	259,854	191,315	181,316	9,999
Ain	108,769	89,417	293,087	205,091	198,186	6,905
Ardèche	71,622	68,900	205,086	146,872	140,522	6,350
Drôme	95,209	96,973	280,400	199,622	192,182	7,440
Isère	237,376	189,228	632,403	440,404	426,604	13,800
Loire	159,246	145,757	474,077	318,052	305,003	13,049
Rhône	325,360	256,619	859,959	598,577	581,979	16,598
Savoie	85,503	71,910	236,577	162,260	157,413	4,847
Haute-Savoie	138,902	104,586	353,759	250,223	243,488	6,735
Allier	77,929	98,200	261,895	184,234	176,129	8,105
Cantal	37,632	44,369	125,253	85,453	82,001	3,452
Haute-Loire	56,454	49,042	157,437	112,172	105,496	6,676
Puy-de-Dôme	141,917	130,477	402,955	284,781	272,394	12,387
Aude	72,418	83,233	220,278	160,959	155,651	5,308
Gard	124,902	153,751	398,507	287,721	278,653	9,068
Hérault	174,771	195,013	535,358	380,512	369,784	10,728
Lozère	21,495	18,082	56,782	41,400	39,577	1,823
Pyrénées-Orientales	77,683	94,071	259,333	176,935	171,754	5,181
Alpes-de Haute-Provence	33,718	35,956	99,506	72,360	69,674	2,686
Haute Alpes	30,622	26,211	84,354	59,166	56,833	2,333
Alpes-Maritimes	192,495	229,531	655,429	430,516	422,026	8,490
Bouches-du-Rôhne	320,831	397,387	1,072,354	735,772	718,218	17,554
Var	161,893	219,722	560,396	390,252	381,615	8,637
Vaucluse	94,871	124,907	309,337	226,725	219,778	6,947
Corse-du-Sud	16,825	21,568	71,011	39,183	38,393	790
Haute-Corse	19,925	26,397	86,185	47,469	46,322	1,147
Guadeloupe	21,630	10,435	225,416	37,556	32,065	5,491
Martinique	30,709	11,865	227,013	55,471	42,574	12,897
French Guiana	3,901	1,890	33,928	6,368	5,791	577
Réunion	61,609	21,380	322,466	88,482	82,989	5,493
Saint Pierre and Miquelon	215	120	4,197	402	335	67
Mayotte	1,173	362	28,246	1,618	1,535	83
Wallis and Futuna	2,924	896	7,058	3,839	3,820	19
French Polynesia	14,879	6,252	106,724	22,594	21,131	1,463
New Caledonia	14,783	14,966	92,619	31,247	29,749	1,498
Source: European Election Database
