= Vendée's 5th constituency =

Constituency of the National Assembly of France

5th constituency of Vendée
- inline Constituency of the National Assembly of France
- Deputy: Pierre Henriet; RE
- Department: Vendée
- Cantons: Chaillé-les-Marais, La Châtaigneraie, Fontenay-le-Comte, L'Hermenault, Luçon, Maillezais, Sainte-Hermine, Saint-Hilaire-des-Loges

The 5th constituency of Vendée is a French legislative constituency in the Vendée département. Like the other 576 French constituencies, it elects one MP using the two-round system, with a run-off if no candidate receives over 50% of the vote in the first round.

== Assembly Members ==
Election	Member	Party
1988	Pierre Métais	PS
1993	Joël Sarlot	UDF
1997	Joël Sarlot	UDF
2002	Joël Sarlot	DL
2007	Joël Sarlot	MPF
2008	Dominique Souchet	MPF
2012	Hugues Fourage	PS
2017	Pierre Henriet	LREM
2022	Pierre Henriet	RE

== Election results ==
=== 2024 ===
Candidate	Party	Alliance	First round		Second round	
Candidate	Party	Alliance	Votes	%	Votes	%
Pierre Henriet	HOR	Ensemble	19,606	34.84	32,085	57.49
Stéphane Buffetaut	RN		21,309	37.87	23,721	42.51
Pierre-Hugues Fourage	DVG	NFP	11,321	20.12		
Marius Galand	LR		2,633	4.68		
Sonia Le Theix	DLF	DSV	742	1.32		
Béatrice Ruault	LO		1,099	1.63		
Valid votes			56,270	97.05	55,806	95.44
Blank votes			1,073	1.85	1,906	3.26
Null votes			639	1.10	760	1.30
Turnout			57,982	69.02	58,472	69.62
Abstentions			26,026	30.98	25,521	30.38
Registered voters			84,008		83,993	
Result			HOR HOLD			

=== 2022 ===
Legislative Election 2022: Vendée's 5th constituency
Party	Candidate	Votes	%	±%
LREM (Ensemble)	Pierre Henriet	15,353	37.39	+5.27
RN	Isabelle Magnin	8,618	20.99	+10.73
LFI (NUPÉS)	Thimothee Thibaud-Lalere	8,261	20.12	−11.40
LR (UDC)	Yveline Thibaud	4,385	10.68	−8.60
REC	Sandrine Delatre	1,720	4.19	N/A
LMR	Pierre Perroy	853	2.08	N/A
Others	N/A	1,868	4.55	
Turnout		41,058	50.17	−2.35
2nd round result
LREM (Ensemble)	Pierre Henriet	22,296	60.94	+7.58
RN	Isabelle Magnin	14,291	39.06	N/A
Turnout		36,587	47.52	+6.11
LREM hold				

=== 2017 ===
Legislative Election 2017: Vendée's 5th constituency
Party	Candidate	Votes	%	±%
LREM	Pierre Henriet	13,740	32.12	
PS	Hugues Fourage	8,400	19.63	
LR	Jean-Michel Lalere	8,247	19.28	
FN	Gérald Oberweis	4,390	10.26	
LFI	Pierre Cotron	3,925	9.17	
EELV	Ghislaine Rautureau	1,163	2.72	
DVD	Olivier Boisseau	897	2.10	
Others	N/A	2,020		
Turnout		42,782	52.52	
2nd round result
LREM	Pierre Henriet	17,999	53.36	
PS	Hugues Fourage	15,732	46.64	
Turnout		33,731	41.41	
LREM gain from PS				

=== 2012 ===
Legislative Election 2012: Vendée's 5th constituency
Party	Candidate	Votes	%	±%
PS	Hugues Fourage	17,461	35.71	
UMP	Joël Sarlot	13,519	27.65	
DVD	Dominique Souchet	8,755	17.90	
FN	Jean-Claude Pasquier	3,913	8.00	
FG	Michèle Tricoire	1,945	3.98	
EELV	Tony Demaurant	1,720	3.52	
AC	Béatrice Moinard	1,305	2.67	
Others	N/A	279		
Turnout		48,897	60.71	
2nd round result
PS	Hugues Fourage	24,733	51.44	
UMP	Joël Sarlot	23,348	48.56	
Turnout		48,081	59.62	
PS gain from MPF				

=== 2008 ===
Vendée 5th by-election
Party	Candidate	Votes	%	±%
MPF	Dominique Souchet	17,758	53.34	+1.22
PS	Daniel David	10,438	31.35	+15.36
MoDem	Sandra Cappi	2,481	7.45	+1.52
Far left	Philippe Terroire	1,760	5.29	+2.40
FN	Jean-Marie Dieulangard	858	2.58	+0.62
Turnout		33,936	42.6	
MPF gain from DVD		Swing		

=== 2007 ===
Legislative Election 2007: Vendée 5th
Party	Candidate	Votes	%	±%
DVD	Joël Sarlot	25,822	52.12	
PS	Claudette Boutet	7,921	15.99	
PRG	Jean-Claude Remaud	4,495	9.07	
LV	Jean Coirier	2,950	5.95	
MoDem	Thierry Hardouin	2,938	5.93	
Far left	Philippe Terroire	1,438	2.89	
CPNT	Dominique Bouhier	1,218	2.46	
FN	Thérèse Gaborit	1,129	2.38	
LO	Maryse Lepron	540	1.10	
MEI	Philippe Charreyron	467	0.94	
DVE	Claude Quintyn	320	0.65	
MNR	Anne-Marie Petit	307	0.62	
Independent	Nathalie Souyri	0	0.00	
Turnout		50,732	63.98	
DVD gain from DL		Swing		

=== 2002 ===
Legislative Election 2002: Vendée 5th
Party	Candidate	Votes	%	±%
DL	Joël Sarlot	26,256	52.23	
LV	Jean Coirier	9,006	17.92	
PRG	Jean-Claude Remaud	8,029	15.97	
FN	Christiane Vrignaud	2,790	5.55	
CPNT	Érika Locteau	1,812	3.60	
PCF	Michèle Tricoire	1,161	2.31	
LO	Monique Marmaros	790	1.57	
MNR	Jacques Périssé	423	0.84	
Turnout		51,407	67.10	
DL gain from UDF		Swing		

=== 1997 ===
Legislative Election 1997: Vendée's 5th constituency
Party	Candidate	Votes	%	±%
UDF	Joël Sarlot	21,357	42.87	
PS	Jean-Claude Remaud	17,259	34.64	
FN	Jean Chataigner	4,444	8.92	
PCF	Raymond Pingault	2,980	5.98	
LV	Franck Plazanet	2,475	4.97	
MEI	Michel Sages	1,307	2.62	
Turnout		53,540	72.84	
2nd round result
UDF	Joël Sarlot	27,803	52.33	
PS	Jean-Claude Remaud	25,330	47.67	
Turnout		56,014	76.21	
UDF hold				
