= Pierre Henriet =

French politician (born 1991)

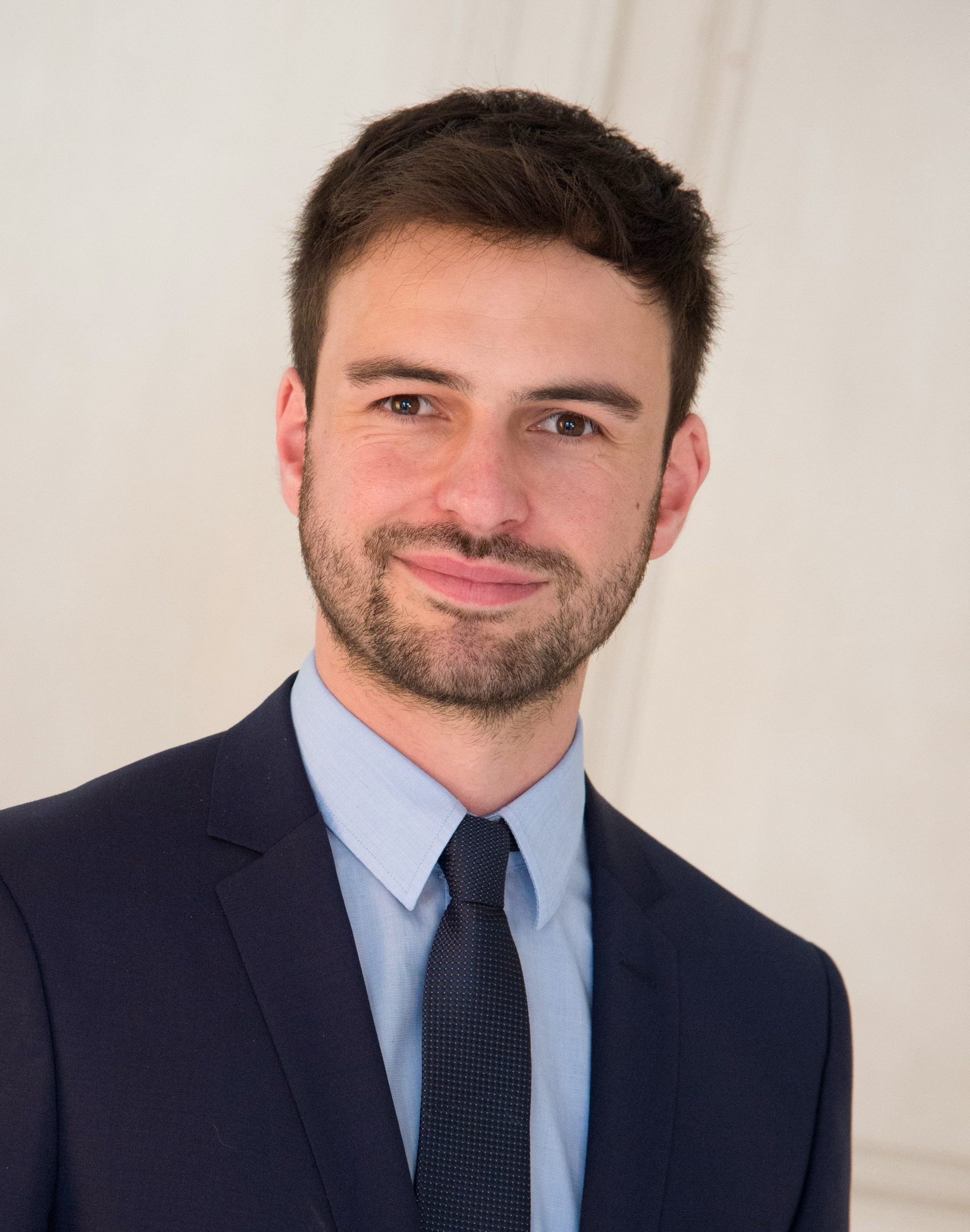

Member of the French National Assembly for Vendée's 5th constituency
- Incumbent
- Assumed office 21 June 2017
- Preceded by: Hugues Fourage

Member of the Municipal council of Saint-Pierre-le-Vieux
- Incumbent
- Assumed office 29 March 2014

Personal details
- Born: 26 November 1991 (age 33); Fontenay-le-Comte, France
- Political party: En Marche!
- Education: University of Nantes
- Occupation: Teacher

Pierre Henriet (born 26 November 1991) is a French politician of the Renaissance (previously La République En Marche! (LREM)) who has been serving as a member of the French National Assembly since the 2017 elections, representing the department of Vendée.

== Early life and education ==
Henriet, born 26 novembre 1991, is from Saint-Pierre-le-Vieux, where his father, Christian Henriet, is the mayor. Currently a Ph.D. student in philosophy of science at the University of Nantes since 2015, he has also completed courses as a temporary epistemologist at the François-Rabelais high school in Fontenay-le-Comte.

== Political career ==
While still studying, Henriet announced his candidacy for the municipal elections of 2014 in Saint-Pierre-le-Vieux. Listed on the list "United for Saint-Pierre-le-Vieux" led by Christian Henriet, his father, he was elected at the end of the first round.

After he worked on Emmanuel Macron's campaign, La République en marche nominated Henriet as its candidate in the 5th constituency of Vendée. In the first round of the legislative elections, he came first with 39.13% of the votes cast. He won the second round against Hugues Fourage of the Socialist Party with 53.36% of the vote.

In the National Assembly, Henriet serves on the Committee on Cultural Affairs and Education. He chairs the International Study Group on the Issues of the Democratic People's Republic of Korea and is a member of Parliamentary Office for the Evaluation of Scientific and Technological Options. During his first term, he was involved in bringing amendments in favor of scientific integrity during the debate on the research programming law. These proposals are included in article 16 of the law.

Henriet was re-elected in the 2022 French legislative election with 60,94% of the vote. In July 2022 he was elected by his peers to head the parliamentary office for the evaluation of scientific and technological choices, succeeding Cédric Villani.

In February 2024, Henriet left the Renaissance group and instead joined the affiliated Horizons group.

== Political positions ==
In April 2018, Henriet joined other co-signatories around Sébastien Nadot in officially filing a request for a commission of inquiry into the legality of French weapons sales to the Saudi-led coalition fighting in Yemen, days before an official visit of Saudi Crown Prince Mohammed bin Salman to Paris.

In July 2019, Henriet decided not to align with his parliamentary group's majority and became one of 52 LREM members who abstained from a vote on the French ratification of the European Union’s Comprehensive Economic and Trade Agreement (CETA) with Canada.

== Controversy ==
In early 2021, the President of the National Assembly Richard Ferrand sanctioned Henriet for use the nickname of "fishwife" to describe one of her fellow MPs by depriving him for one month of a quarter of his allocated parliamentary allowance.

== See also ==
- 2017 French legislative election
