= Vendée's 4th constituency =

Constituency of the National Assembly of France

4th constituency of Vendée
- inline Constituency of the National Assembly of France
- Deputy: Veronique Besse; DVD
- Department: Vendée
- Cantons: Les Herbiers, Montaigu, Mortagne-sur-Sèvre, Pouzauges, Saint-Fulgent
- Registered voters: 134,426

The 4th constituency of Vendée is a French legislative constituency in the Vendée département. Like the other 576 French constituencies, it elects one MP using the two-round system, with a run-off if no candidate receives over 50% of the vote in the first round.

== Description ==
- Philippe de Villiers resigns on 24 October 1994. Bruno Retailleau is elected on 26 November 1994 in a by-election.
- Philippe de Villiers resigned on 19 July 2004 to sit in the European Parliament. Véronique Besse is elected on 23 January 2005 in a by-election.

== Deputies ==
Election	Member	Party
1958	Antoine Guitton	CNIP
1962	Vincent Ansquer	UNR
1967	Vincent Ansquer	UDR
1968	Vincent Ansquer	UDR
1973	Vincent Ansquer	UDR
1978	Vincent Ansquer	RPR
1981	Vincent Ansquer	RPR
1986	Proportional representation - no election by constituency	
1988	Philippe de Villiers	UDF
1993	Philippe de Villiers	UDF
1994	Bruno Retailleau	LDI
1997	Philippe de Villiers	LDI
2002	Philippe de Villiers	MPF
2005	Véronique Besse	MPF
2007	Véronique Besse	MPF
2012	Véronique Besse	MPF
2017	Martine Leguille-Balloy	REM
2022	Véronique Besse	DVD

== Election results ==
=== 2024 ===
Candidate	Party	Alliance	First round		Second round	
Candidate	Party	Alliance	Votes	%	Votes	%
Véronique Besse	Ind	DVD	28,086	39.31	31,068	43.36
Jacques Proux	RN		16,345	22.88	17,613	24.58
Ilias Nagnonhou	RE	Ensemble	13,192	18.46	10,796	15.07
Julie Mariel-Godard	PCF		13,164	18.42	12,170	16.99
Claude Bour	LO		666	0.93		
Valid votes			71,453	97.31	71,647	97.97
Blank votes			1,442	1.96	1,108	1.52
Null votes			533	0.73	375	0.51
Turnout			73,428	70.12	73,130	69.83
Abstentions			31,289	29.88	31,599	30.17
Registered voters			104,717		104,729	
Result			DVD HOLD			

=== 2022 ===
Legislative Election 2022: Vendée's 4th constituency
Party	Candidate	Votes	%	±%
DVD	Véronique Besse	16,904	34.97	N/A
LREM (Ensemble)	Martine Leguille-Balloy	10,531	21.78	-24.86
PCF (NUPÉS)	Céline Sauvetre	8,498	17.58	+2.25
RN	Bruno Dalcantara	5,218	10.79	+3.48
DVE	Theodore Babarit	2,797	5.79	N/A
DVC	Denis Le Bars	2,300	4.76	N/A
Others	N/A	2,095	4.32	
Turnout		48,343	48.24	−3.29
2nd round result
DVD	Véronique Besse	23,336	59.69	N/A
LREM (Ensemble)	Martine Leguille-Balloy	15,761	40.31	−22.19
Turnout		39,097	41.75	+2.31
DVD gain from LREM				

=== 2017 ===
Legislative Election 2017: Vendée's 4th constituency
Party	Candidate	Votes	%	±%
LREM	Martine Leguille-Balloy	23,508	46.60	
UDI	Wilfrid Montassier	14,005	27.76	
LFI	Anita Lavergne	4,197	8.32	
FN	Danise Vicente	3,678	7.29	
EELV	Claudine Goichon	2,449	4.85	
PCF	Marie-Françoise Michenaud	1,123	2.33	
Others	N/A	1,484		
Turnout		50,444	51.53	
2nd round result
LREM	Martine Leguille-Balloy	24,129	62.50	
UDI	Wilfrid Montassier	14,475	37.50	
Turnout		38,604	39.44	
LREM gain from MPF				

=== 2012 ===
Legislative Election 2012: Vendée 4th
Party	Candidate	Votes	%	±%
MPF	Véronique Besse	31,806	57,04	−3,92
PS	Maï Haeffelin	14,248	25,55	+9,15
FN	Maryse Borie	3,555	6,38	+4,72
MoDem	Christian Ricot	2,253	4,04	−6,82
PCF	Marie-Françoise Michenaud	1,630	2,92	+2,92
LV	Daniel Rondeau	1,245	2,23	−2,19
DVE	Yann Denis	422	0,76	−0,68
DVE	Laurent Orgeas	352	0,63	+0,63
Far left	Michel Stambouli	245	0,44	−0,91
Turnout		56,858	60,15	−3,91
MPF hold		Swing		

=== 2007 ===
Legislative Election 2007: Vendée 4th
Party	Candidate	Votes	%	±%
MPF	Véronique Besse	34,458	60.96	
PS	Jean-François Bolteau	9,269	16.40	
MoDem	Arnold Schwerdorffer	6,137	10.86	
LV	Patrick You	2,501	4.42	
CPNT	Martine Aury	1,062	1.88	
FN	Jean-Marie Dieulangard	938	1.66	
DVE	Anita Barbarit	813	1.44	
Far left	Jean-Claude Chevallier	763	1.35	
LO	Michel Stambouli	585	1.03	
Turnout		56,525	64.06	
MPF hold		Swing		

=== 2002 ===
Legislative Election 2002: Vendée's 4th constituency
Party	Candidate	Votes	%	±%
MPF	Philippe de Villiers	38,113	67.15	
DVG	Michelle Devanne	9,794	17.26	
DVD	Madeleine Lelievre	2,664	4.69	
DVE	David Lelievre	2,158	3.80	
FN	Georges Kouskoff	1,767	3.11	
Others	N/A	2,258		
Turnout		58,636	68.57	
MPF gain from DVD				

=== 1997 ===
Legislative Election 1997: Vendée's 4th constituency
Party	Candidate	Votes	%	±%
DVD	Philippe de Villiers	26,560	47.44	
LV	Philippe Boursier	11,525	20.59	
RPR	Marcel Albert	10,465	18.69	
FN	Christian Proust	3,852	6.88	
DVD	Madeleine Lelièvre	1,806	3.23	
PCF	Magali Burgaud	1,775	3.17	
Turnout		60,402	76.62	
2nd round result
DVD	Philippe de Villiers	36,931	68.35	
LV	Philippe Boursier	17,103	31.65	
Turnout		57,910	73.47	
DVD hold				
