= Martine Leguille-Balloy =

French politician (born 1957)

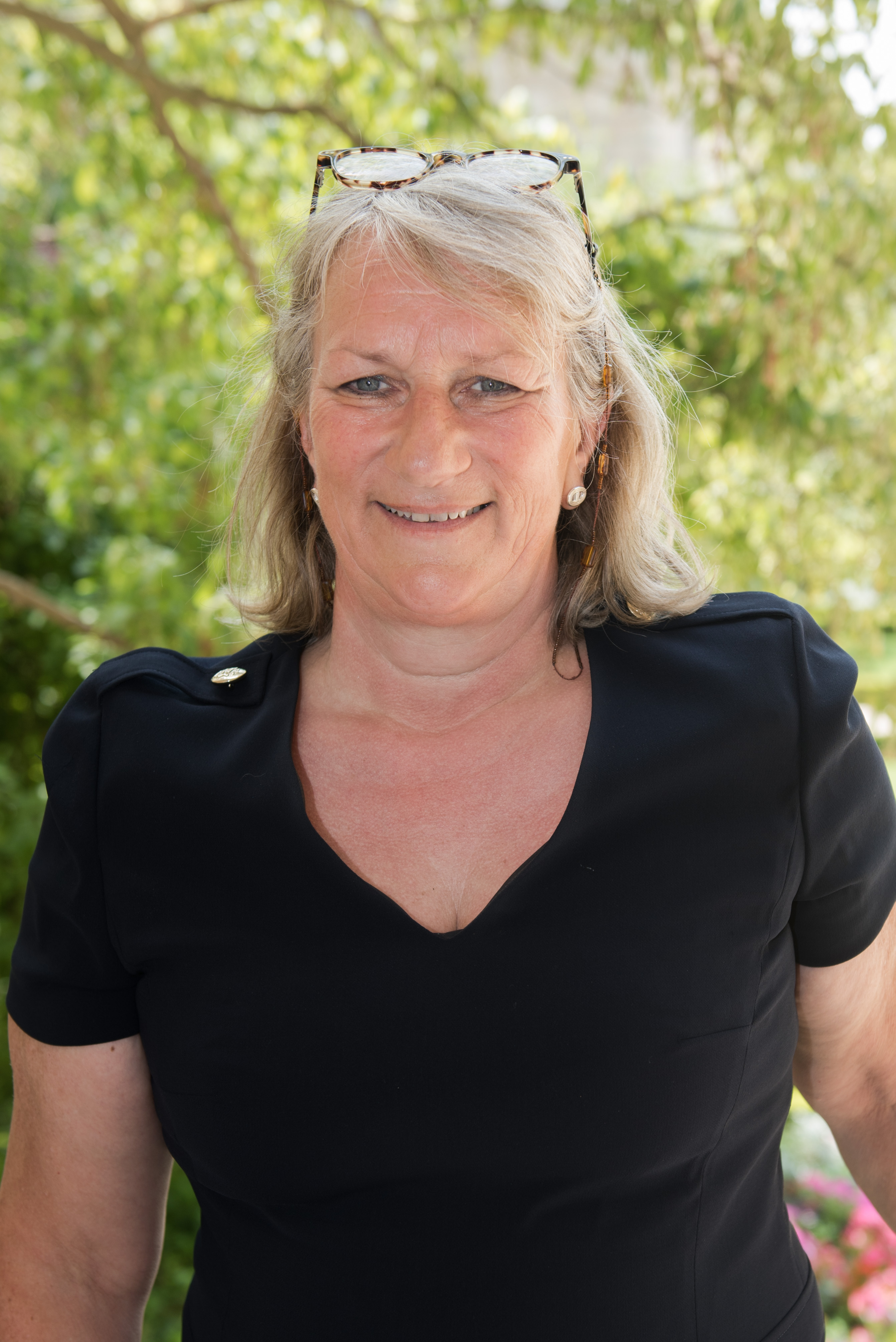

Member of the National Assembly for Vendée's 4th constituency
- In office 21 June 2017 – 21 June 2022
- Preceded by: Véronique Besse
- Succeeded by: Véronique Besse

Personal details
- Born: 6 September 1957 (age 68) La Guerche-sur-l'Aubois, France
- Party: La République En Marche!

Martine Leguille-Balloy (born 6 September 1957) is a French politician of La République En Marche! (LREM) who was elected to the French National Assembly on 18 June 2017, representing the department of Vendée.

== Political career ==
In 2012, Leguille-Balloy joined the Union of Democrats and Independents (UDI). An ally of Jean Arthuis within the Centrist Alliance, she supported the Alliance's decision not to endorse any candidate in The Republicans' primaries ahead of the 2017 presidential election. When the Centrist Alliance formally endorsed Emmanuel Macron instead, Leguille-Balloy and the Alliance's other members were excluded from the UDI. In the 2017 French legislative election, she defeated Véronique Besse.

In parliament, Leguille-Balloy served as member of the Foreign Affairs Committee. In addition to her committee assignments, she is part of the French Parliamentary Friendship Group with the Philippines. Since 2019, she has also been a member of the French delegation to the Franco-German Parliamentary Assembly and a substitute member of the French delegation to the Parliamentary Assembly of the Council of Europe (PACE).

She lost her seat to Véronique Besse in the 2022 French legislative election.

== Political positions ==
In July 2019, Leguille-Balloy voted in favor of the French ratification of the European Union’s Comprehensive Economic and Trade Agreement (CETA) with Canada.

== See also ==
- 2017 French legislative election
