= Philippe de Villiers =

French politician and essayist (born 1949)

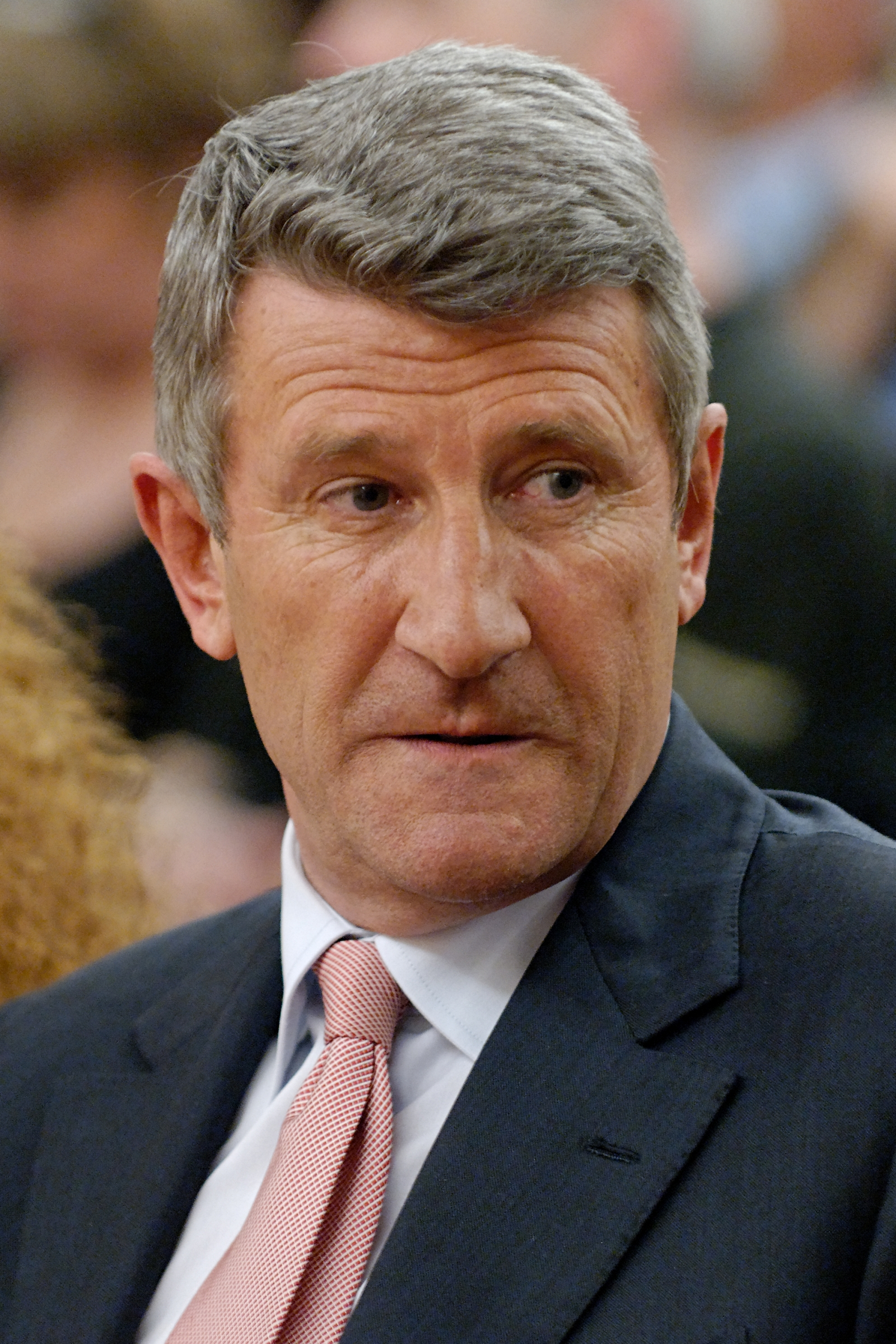
- De Villiers in 2009

President of the Movement for France
- In office 20 November 1994 – 28 June 2018
- Preceded by: Position established
- Succeeded by: Position abolished

Member of the European Parliament
- In office 20 July 2004 – 30 June 2014
- Constituency: West France
- In office 20 July 1999 – 16 December 1999
- Constituency: France
- In office 19 July 1994 – 15 June 1997
- Constituency: France

President of the General Council of Vendée
- In office 3 October 1988 – 31 October 2010
- Preceded by: Michel Crucis
- Succeeded by: Bruno Retailleau

Member of the National Assembly for Vendée
- In office 12 June 1997 – 19 July 2004
- Preceded by: Bruno Retailleau
- Succeeded by: Véronique Besse
- Constituency: 4th
- In office 23 June 1988 – 24 October 1994
- Preceded by: Proportional representation
- Succeeded by: Bruno Retailleau
- Constituency: 4th
- In office 2 June 1987 – 14 May 1988
- Preceded by: Vincent Ansquer
- Succeeded by: Constituency abolished
- Constituency: At-large

Secretary of State for Culture
- In office 20 March 1986 – 25 June 1987
- Prime Minister: Jacques Chirac
- Preceded by: Position established
- Succeeded by: Position abolished

Personal details
- Born: Philippe Marie Jean Joseph Le Jolis de Villiers de Saintignon; 25 March 1949 (age 77) Boulogne, France
- Party: Reconquête (2021–present)
- Other political affiliations: Republican Party (1985–1994); Movement for France (1994–2018)
- Spouse: Dominique du Buor de Villeneuve
- Children: 7
- Relatives: Pierre de Villiers (brother)
- Education: University of Nantes; Sciences Po; École nationale d'administration

Philippe Marie Jean Joseph Le Jolis de Villiers de Saintignon (born 25 March 1949), known as Philippe de Villiers (French: [filip də vilje]), is a French entrepreneur, politician and novelist. He is the founder of the Puy du Fou theme park in Vendée, which is centred around the history of France. Appointed Secretary of State for Culture in 1986 by President François Mitterrand, de Villiers entered the National Assembly the following year and the European Parliament in 1994.

After leaving the Republican Party (PR) to found the Movement for France (MPF), he was its nominee in the 1995 and 2007 presidential elections. He received 4.74% of the vote the first time, placing seventh; he won 2.23% of the vote twelve years later, putting him in sixth place. De Villiers has been internationally notable for his criticism of mass immigration and Islam in France, as well as his ardent support of the French way of life.

His brother, General Pierre de Villiers, served as Chief of the Defence Staff from 2014 to 2017.

== Personal life ==
Le Jolis De Villiers family coat of arms

De Villiers was born in Boulogne in the department of Vendée, Western France, the second of five children and eldest son of Jacques Le Jolis de Villiers de Saintignon (born in Nancy, 14 November 1913) and his wife Edwige d'Arexy (born in Nantes, 1 July 1925). His paternal grandfather, Louis Le Jolis de Villiers, born at Brucheville on 17 October 1874, was killed in action in World War I at Saint-Paul-en-Forêt on 10 September 1914. On 24 October 1904, he had married Jeanne de Saintignon (27 July 1880 – 25 August 1959), by whom he had five children, the youngest of whom was Philippe's father, Jacques.

De Villiers received a master's degree in Law in 1971, graduated from the Paris Institute of Political Studies in 1973 and from the École nationale d'administration in 1978. After his studies, De Villiers became a successful entrepreneur. He created the Puy du Fou, one of the most visited theme parks in France, as a living showcase for its history. The theme park includes a replica medieval city with the 'Gallo-Roman Stadium', a colosseum designed by De Villiers to stoke patriotic feeling by recreating Gallic rebellions against Imperial Rome. The Puy du Fou park received awards from the Themed Entertainment Association in 2012, 2016, 2017 and 2019.

He is married to Dominique du Buor de Villeneuve, born in Valenciennes on 4 October 1950 and has seven children.

== Career ==
=== 1995 presidential bid ===
From 1976 to 1978, De Villiers served as a senior civil servant in the Chirac administration. In 1981, he resigned his post as subprefect because he did not want to serve the government of the Socialist President François Mitterrand. In 1986 and 1987, he briefly served as Secretary of State for Culture (Secrétaire d'État auprès du Ministre de la Culture) in the second government of Jacques Chirac, under Minister François Léotard. His appointment was initially viewed badly by Libération and several other press agencies, which referred to his "ambiguous personality". However, Villiers supported Leotard's mixed, non-ideological policy towards French culture.

In 1987, he was elected into local office as a member in Valéry Giscard d'Estaing's Republican Party. He became a rising star within the Union for French Democracy. During the public debate over the Maastricht Treaty, which established the European Union, in 1992, he achieved lasting prominence in the media as an anti-Treaty activist. This set him apart from most prominent members of the mainstream political right. The French people narrowly ratified the Treaty in September 1992.

De Villiers led an anti-European integration list in 1994 receiving about 12 percent of the votes, placing it in third place behind the Gaullists and the Socialists. Villiers centered the campaign on opposition to the European Union along with a call to eliminate corruption in government. In November 1994, Villers left the Republican Party to form Movement for France. He ran for President of France in 1995 and received about 5 percent of the vote.

=== 2007 presidential bid ===
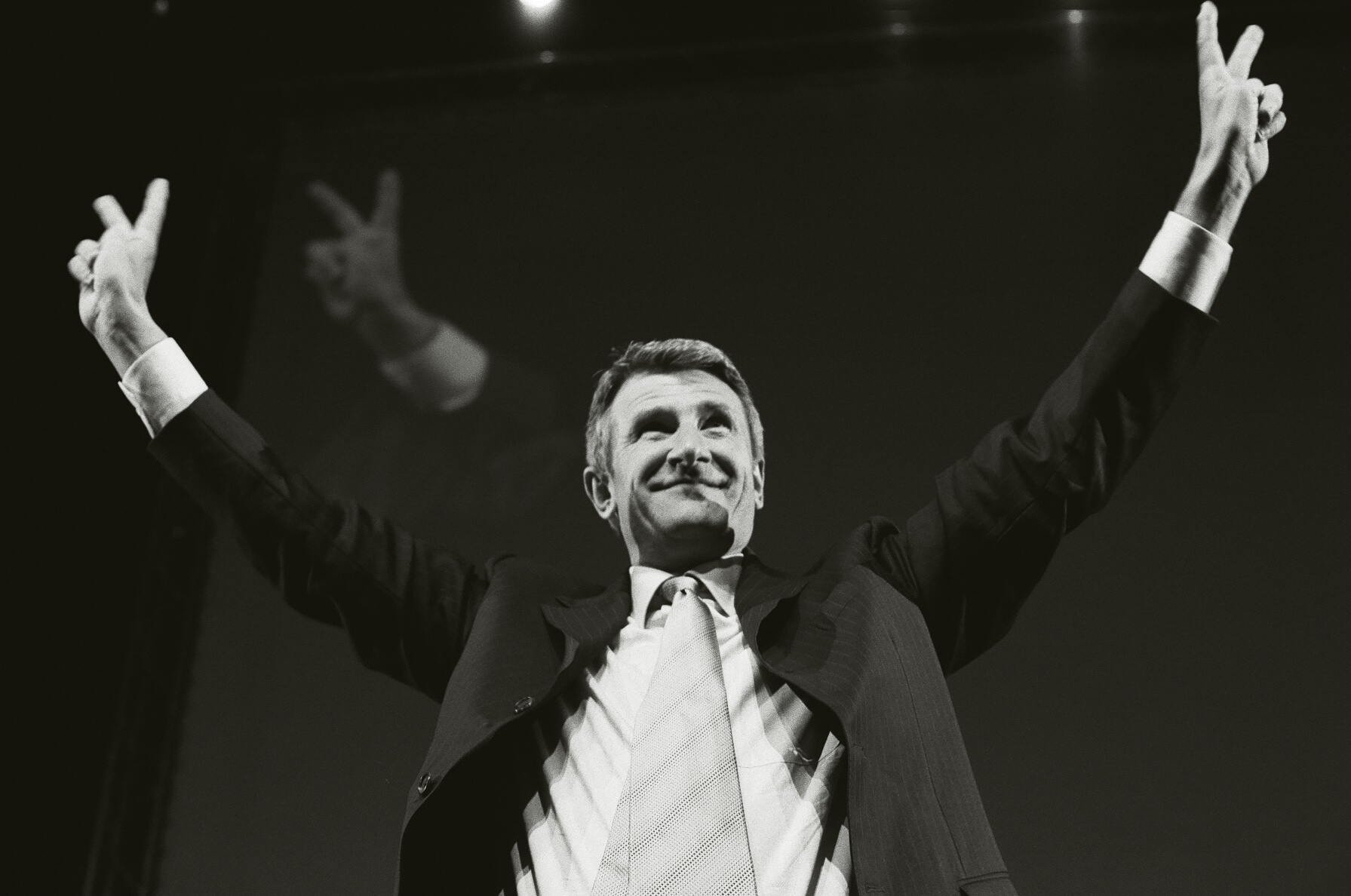
Philippe de Villiers, May 2005

Once a member of the Union for French Democracy, he then led the Movement for France, which enjoyed some success in elections for the European Parliament. The party's share of the vote declined in the 2004 European Parliament election. Nevertheless, Villiers and two other members of his party were elected.

De Villiers ran for the French presidency in 2007, and based his campaign on his opposition to what he sees as the rampant Islamisation of France. In May 2006, polls showed that he had garnered the support of about 4% of the electorate, almost twice as high as he actually polled in the first round of the presidential election. An "Ifop-Paris-Match" poll conducted on 12 October 2006 gave him his highest ever popularity rating, with 37% saying they "have an excellent or good opinion" of Villiers, and 28% saying they could vote for him in 2007. This was not borne out in the results of the first round of voting, with him receiving less than 3% of the popular vote.

Following the first round of the 2007 presidential election, he called on voters to vote for Union for a Popular Movement (UMP) candidate Nicolas Sarkozy to counter the Socialist Party's candidate Ségolène Royal and the left.

Villiers and Konstantin Malofeev are planning to build two Russian history related theme parks: one in Moscow and one in Yalta (Crimea); this is in spite of Malofeev being added to the European Union list of people and organizations sanctioned during the Russo-Ukrainian War (Malofeev is suspected of funding the pro-Russian rebels in Donbas during the Russo-Ukrainian War). In August 2014 Villiers travelled to Crimea to meet Russian president Vladimir Putin; while there, he defended the 2014 Russian annexation of Crimea by saying the Crimean park will "promote the history of Crimea as part of the long history of Russia". He also stated there "I would gladly swap Hollande and Sarkozy for Putin".

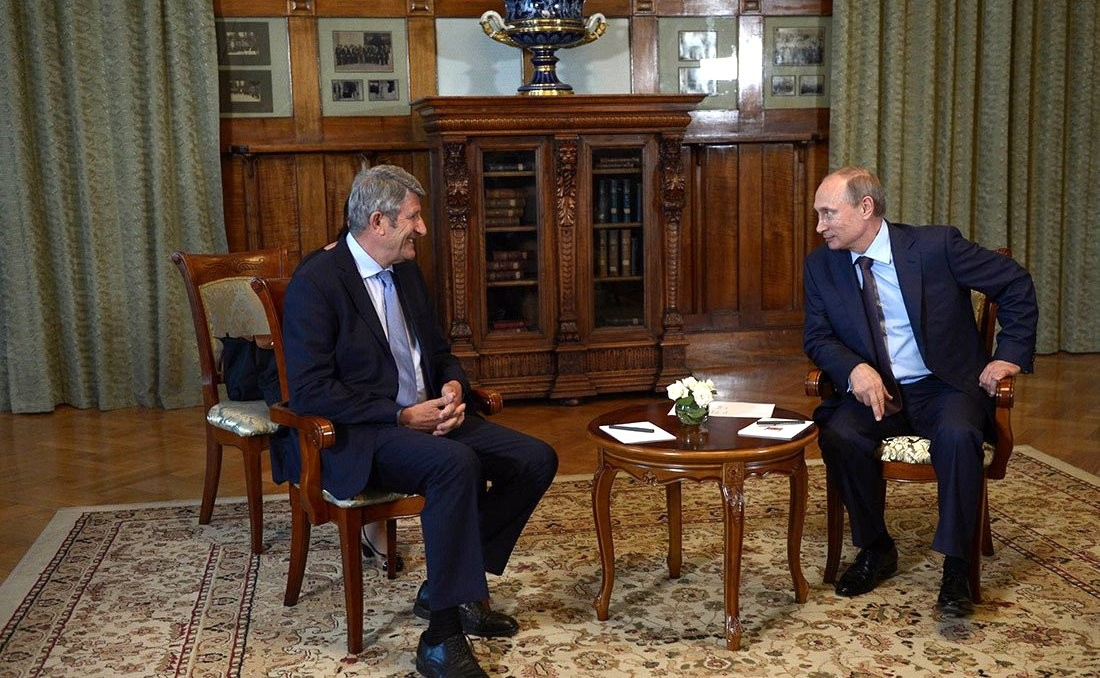
Philippe de Villiers during a meeting with Russian President Vladimir Putin, in August 2014.

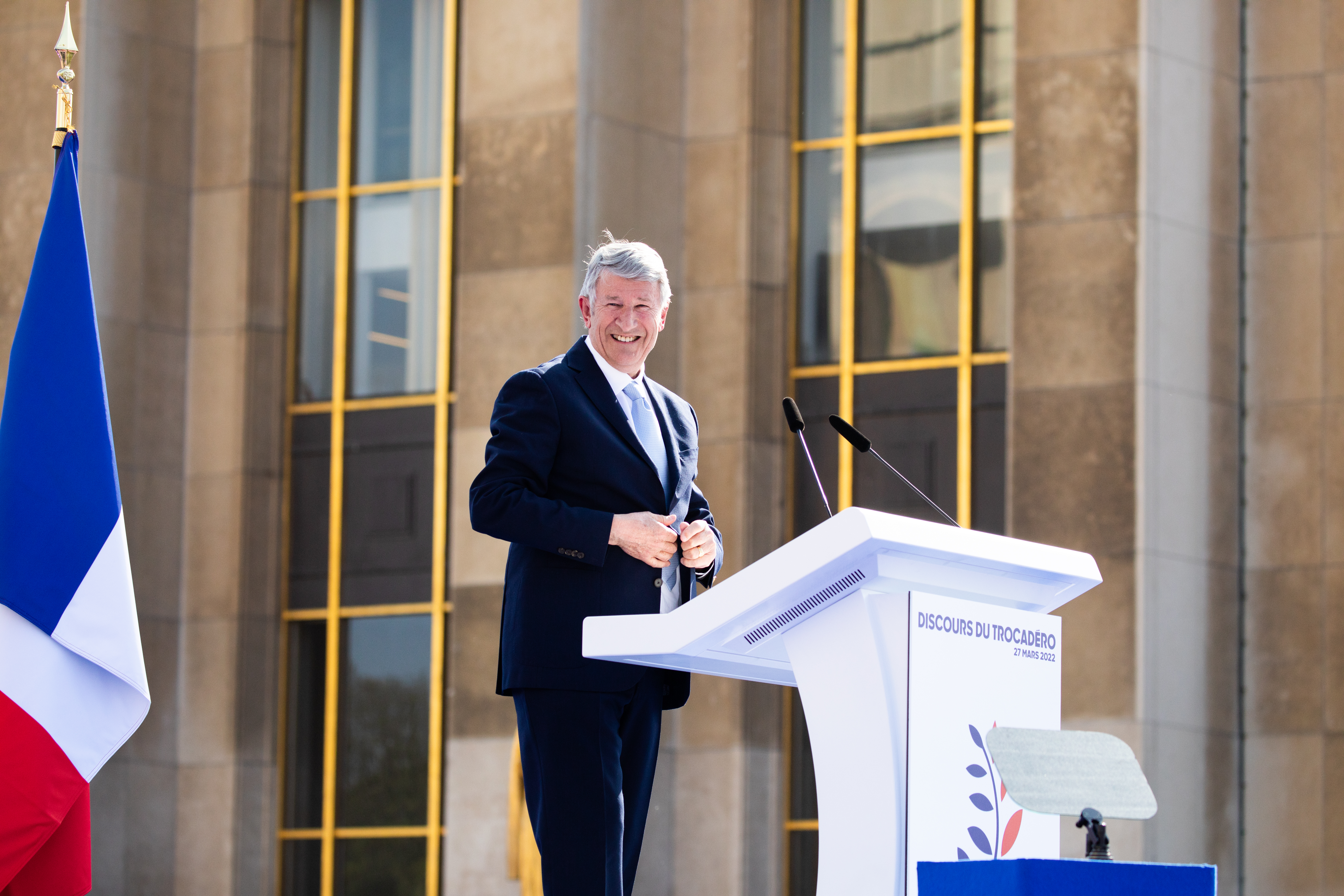
Philippe de Villiers at the podium just before the arrival of Éric Zemmour at the Trocadéro meeting, March 27, 2022

During the 2022 presidential election, he officially announced his support for Éric Zemmour. He also joined his political party Reconquête.

== Political positions ==
=== Criticism of Islam ===
De Villiers is known for his criticism of Islam in France. He has stated, "I am the only politician who tells the French the truth about the Islamisation of France" and, "I do not think Islam is compatible with the French Republic". He advocates ending all construction of mosques, banning all Islamist organisations suspected of links to terrorism, and expelling extremist individuals from France.

De Villiers published Les mosquées de Roissy: nouvelles révélations sur l'islamisation en France (The Mosques of Roissy: New Revelations about Islamization in France) in 2006. In it he alleged, using internal documents from whistleblowers, that the Muslim Brotherhood had infiltrated security personnel at Charles de Gaulle Airport near Paris. The book led to revocation of seventy-two employees' security clearances and closure of six makeshift Muslim prayer rooms.

Der Spiegel, The Wall Street Journal, The Boston Globe, and The San Francisco Chronicle have labelled De Villiers as "far right" because of his views of Islam and of Muslim immigrants.

=== Political philosophy ===
Villiers is a nationalist, a traditionalist, and a leading eurosceptic. He has self-described as a "rooted conservative". During his tenure under François Léotard, he said that he shared Léotard's American-based "libertarian liberalism". Despite claims that he was part of the GUD, Groupe Union Défense , a far right political party associated with Jean Marie LePen which was eventually dissolved by the French government in 2024, de Villiers was never a member of this organisation. In 1995, The Economist referred to him as "an ephemeral Catholic monarchist".

He advocates cutting taxes, expelling all illegal immigrants, and preventing Turkey from joining the EU. He is a vocal critic of the European Union's relationship with France, accusing it of "destroying their jobs, their security and their identity" and saying that "the Europe of Brussels is an anti-democratic dictatorship". He was a leader of the side advocating a 'No' vote in the 2005 French referendum of the European Constitution. The 'No' side won the vote, which the activists believed constituted a major victory for Euroscepticism in France. Villiers then launched a campaign to restore the franc, remarking that "Everybody notes today that the adoption of the euro was a technical success but its economic, political and human toll is incontestable."

Villiers opposes immigration into France in general, but he has advocated that "individual cases be treated with the greatest humanity." He also opposes expelling current immigrants residing in France or subjecting them to discrimination in housing, employment, or other spheres. Despite their differences on these and other issues, the National Front's Jean Marie Le Pen has remarked that Villiers' ideas were "lifted" from him and that their "votes should be added together".

Villiers coined the phrase "Polish Plumber" in a June 2005 political speech about the Bolkestein directive, referring to the perceived threat of cheap East European labour to French wages. The mythical figure became a central point of debate in France, and it later prompted an international controversy. He has also referred to the "Latvian mason" and the "Estonian gardener."

American author Harvey Gerald Simmons has compared the "Villiers phenomenon" to Ross Perot's support in the 1992 American Presidential election. He stated that De Villiers has a populist, anti-establishment image that puts him on the edges of the mainstream political right of France rather than in the far right.

=== Support base ===
De Villiers gathers his support from practising Roman Catholics, artisans, retired people, farmers and small business owners.

== Offices held ==
Governmental function

Secretary of State for Communication: 1986–1987.

Electoral mandates

European Parliament

Member of European Parliament: 1994-1997 (Resignation, reelected in the parliamentary elections in 1997) / July–December 1999 (Resignation) / 2004-2018. Elected in 1994, reelected in 1999, 2004, 2009.

National Assembly of France

Member of the National Assembly of France for Vendée: 1987-1994 (Became member of European Parliament in 1994) / 1997-2004 (Became member of European Parliament in 2004). Elected in 1987, reelected in 1988, 1993, 1997, 2002.

General Council

President of the General Council of Vendée: 1988-2010 (Resignation). Reelected in 1992, 1994, 1998, 2001, 2004, 2008.

General councillor of Vendée: 1987-2010 (Resignation). Reelected in 1988, 1994, 2001, 2008.

Political function

President of the Movement for France: 1994-1999 / 2000-2018 (party dissolved).

== Electoral history ==
=== Presidential ===
President of the French Republic
Election	First round				Second round			
Election	Votes	%	Position	Result	Votes	%	Position	Result
1995	1,443,186	4.74%	(#7)	Lost				
2007	818,407	2.23	(#6)	Lost				

== Works ==
- de Villiers, Philippe (1988). Lettres aux jeunes qui ont peur de l'avenir. Paris: J.C. Lattès. ISBN 9782709606868. OCLC 19814079.
- de Villiers, Philippe (1989). La chienne qui miaule. Paris: Albin Michel. ISBN 9782226041319. OCLC 23956484.
- de Villiers, Philippe (1989). Lettre ouverte aux coupeurs de têtes et aux menteurs du bicentenaire. Paris: Albin Michel. ISBN 9782226037688. OCLC 21162937.
- de Villiers, Philippe (1992). Notre Europe sans Maastricht. Paris: Albin Michel. ISBN 9782226061355. OCLC 27723538.
- de Villiers, Philippe (1993). Avant qu'il ne soit trop tard. Paris: Albin Michel. ISBN 9782226061591. OCLC 300929353.
- de Villiers, Philippe (1994). La société de connivence : ou comment faire avaler des serpents à sonnette. Paris: Albin Michel. ISBN 9782226069184. OCLC 463896420.
- de Villiers, Philippe (1996). Dictionnaire du politiquement correct à la française. Paris: Albin Michel. ISBN 9782226085559. OCLC 35365534.
- de Villiers, Philippe (1998). La machination d'Amsterdam. Paris: Albin Michel. ISBN 9782226105370. OCLC 40427463.
- de Villiers, Philippe; Chamard, Michel (2001). L'aventure du Puy-du-Fou : entretiens avec Michel Chamard. Paris: Albin Michel. ISBN 9782226125927. OCLC 466988772.
- de Villiers, Philippe (2001). Vous avez aimé les farines animales, vous adorerez l'euro. Paris: Albin Michel. ISBN 9782226128065. OCLC 48773417.
- de Villiers, Philippe (2003). La 51ème étoile du drapeau américain. Paris: Albin Michel. ISBN 9782226142115. OCLC 53330108.
- de Villiers, Philippe (2004). Quand les abeilles meurent, les jours de l'homme sont comptés : un scandale d'Etat. Paris: Albin Michel. ISBN 9782226142108. OCLC 417647739.
- de Villiers, Philippe (2005). Les turqueries du grand Mamamouchi. Paris: Albin Michel. ISBN 9782226157027. OCLC 57464937.
- de Villiers, Philippe (2006). Les mosquées de Roissy. Paris: Albin Michel. ISBN 9782226172648. OCLC 68706604.
- de Villiers, Philippe (2007). Une France qui gagne. Paris: Albin Michel. ISBN 9782268061481. OCLC 81249751.
- de Villiers, Philippe (2012). Les secrets du Puy du Fou. Paris: Albin Michel. ISBN 9782226240170. OCLC 793723733.
- de Villiers, Philippe (2012). Le roman de Charette. Paris: Albin Michel. ISBN 9782226244215. OCLC 814233679.
- de Villiers, Philippe (2013). Le roman de Saint Louis. Paris: Albin Michel. ISBN 9782226249777. OCLC 870978887.
- de Villiers, Philippe (2014). Le roman de Jeanne d'Arc. Paris: Albin Michel. ISBN 9782226312341. OCLC 897805802.
- de Villiers, Philippe (2015). Le moment est venu de dire ce que j'ai vu. Paris: Albin Michel. ISBN 9782226319067. OCLC 923825587.
- de Villiers, Philippe (2016). Les cloches sonneront-elles encore demain ?. Paris: Albin Michel. ISBN 9782226393784.
- Le Puy du Fou : un rêve d'enfance, Éditions du Rocher, 2017, 308 p. (ISBN 978-2-268-09934-7)
- Le Mystère Clovis, Paris: Éditions Albin Michel, 2018.
- J'ai tiré sur le fil du mensonge et tout est venu, Paris: Fayard, 2019.
- Les Gaulois réfractaires demandent des comptes au Nouveau Monde, Paris: Fayard, 2020.
- Le Jour d'après, Éditions Albin Michel, 2021.
- La Valse de l'adieu, Paris: Plon, 2022.
- Le Roman du Roi Soleil, Paris: Éditions Litos, 2024, 480 p., Poche (ISBN 978-2-38506-105-0).
- Mémoricide, Paris: Fayard, 2024, 384 p. (ISBN 978-2213731087).
- Populicide, Paris: Fayard, 2025, 418 p. (ISBN 978-2-213-73166-7).
