= Philippe Darniche =

French politician (born 1943)

Philippe Darniche (born 23 February 1943) is a French politician, and a former member of the Senate of France. He represented the Vendée department in the Pays de la Loire region from 1995 to 2014, and is a member of the Movement for France party.

== Biography ==
Secretary and later vice president of the Vendée Pharmacists' Union (1975–1981); vice president and later president of the Giphar-France pharmacists' association (1981–1990).

Active in local politics alongside André Nicou, Philippe Darniche was elected mayor of Mouilleron-le-Captif (Vendée) in 1983, succeeding Nicou. At the time, he was a member of the UDF.

A member of the National Executive Committee of Philippe de Villiers Movement for France—of which he was one of the founders—he became a general councilor for the canton of La Roche-Sur-Yon Nord in 1992, and was then elected senator for the Vendée on September 24, 1995. Re-elected in 2004 and again in 2009, he was re-elected mayor in 2014 in the first round with 77.44% of the vote.

In 1998, he founded the Face & Si Festival in Mouilleron-le-Captif.

He voted against the European Fiscal Compact in October 2012.

In February 2018, he announced that he would step down as mayor at the end of March 2018 to serve as an advisor to his successor until the end of the latter’s term in 2020.

== Bibliography ==
- Page on the Senate website (in French)
