= Dominique Souchet =

French politician (born 1946)

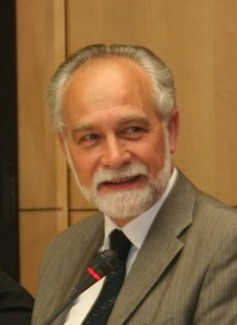
Dominique Souchet

Dominique Souchet (French pronunciation: [dɔminik suʃɛ]; born July 9, 1946 in La Rochelle, Charente-Maritime) was a member of the National Assembly of France between 2008 and 2012. He represented Vendée's 5th constituency, is a member of the Movement for France and does not align himself with any parliamentary group.

He succeeded Joël Sarlot when Sarlot's 2007 re-election win was invalidated by the Constitutional Council.
