= Movement for France =

Defunct French political party

Movement for France Mouvement pour la France
- Leader: Philippe de Villiers
- Founder: Philippe de Villiers
- Founded: 20 November 1994
- Dissolved: 28 June 2018
- Split from: Union for French Democracy
- Headquarters: 16 bis avenue de la Motte-Picquet – 75007 Paris
- Ideology: National conservatism Souverainism; French nationalism
- Political position: Right-wing
- European affiliation: Movement for a Europe of Liberties and Democracy (2011–2015)
- European Parliament group: Europe of Freedom and Democracy (2009–2014)
- Colours: Purple

Website
- www.pourlafrance.fr

The Movement for France (French: Mouvement pour la France, MPF; French pronunciation: [muvmɑ̃ puʁ laˈfʁɑ̃s]) was a conservative Eurosceptic French political party, founded on 20 November 1994, with a marked regional stronghold in Vendée. It was led by Philippe de Villiers, once secretary of state for culture under Jacques Chirac.

The party was considered Eurosceptic, though not to the extent of seeking withdrawal from the European Union, contrasting with some mainstream Eurosceptic parties such as the UK Independence Party (UKIP). The MPF resisted increases in European integration and campaigned successfully for a "no" vote in the French referendum of 2005 on the proposed European Constitution. It was also strongly opposed to the possible accession of Turkey to the European Union and to what it saw as the Islamisation of France.

The party was a member of President Nicolas Sarkozy's presidential majority, which gathered allies of the ruling party Union for a Popular Movement (UMP). However, the party eventually distanced itself from Sarkozy, and party leader Villiers expressed support for Marine Le Pen in the 2017 presidential elections.

== History ==
=== 1990s ===
Old logo of the MPF

Founded in 1994, the party nominated Philippe de Villiers as candidate in the 1995 presidential election. He obtained over a million votes and 4.74% of the popular vote, but failed to pass 5%.

In the 1997 legislative election, the MPF joined forces with the National Centre of Independents and Peasants as La Droite Indépendante (LDI). Philippe de Villiers was re-elected, as was one of his allies, who nonetheless left the party soon thereafter.

It contested the 1999 European Parliamentary elections in alliance with the Rassemblement pour la France (RPF) of Charles Pasqua, the combination winning 13 seats, surpassing Nicolas Sarkozy's Rassemblement pour la République (RPR) list.

=== 2000s ===
The MPF formed an alliance with the RPF, but Villiers fell out with Pasqua the following year. Standing by itself in the 2004 European elections, the MPF obtained 7.6% of the popular vote and returned three Members of the European Parliament (MEPs). The party was a member of the Independence and Democracy group in the European Parliament.

Villiers declared his candidacy for the 2007 presidential election and appointed a secretary-general, Guillaume Peltier, then ranked second in the party. He ranked sixth out of twelve candidates, obtaining 2.23% (818,407 votes), down almost 2% from his previous candidacy in 1995. His best scores came in Pays de la Loire with 4.99% and Poitou-Charentes with 3.58%. Unlike in 1995, he failed to win in his department of Vendée, where he obtained 11.28% (over 20% in 1995).

In the 2007 legislative election, MPF candidates ran nationwide, but only one candidate was elected – Véronique Besse in Vendée's 4th constituency by the first round. Former MPF member Joël Sarlot was also elected by the first round in the Vendée's 5th constituency. Sarlot subsequently lent support to the victorious Union for a Popular Movement (UMP) in the National Assembly. Sarlot's election was invalidated in 2007 and Dominique Souchet, a Villierist won the ensuing by-election easily. Other candidates, mostly in the south of France obtained important scores. Jacques Bompard, in the 4th constituency of Vaucluse won over 20%.

In the 2009 European Parliament election, the party ran with Hunting, Fishing, Nature, Tradition under the umbrella of the Libertas political movement led by Irish businessman Declan Ganley. It won 4.8% and only Philippe de Villiers was re-elected: Patrick Louis was defeated. The MPF was the only Libertas affiliated party throughout the whole of the European Union to elect MEPs in 2009. The party was member of the Europe of Freedom and Democracy (EFD) group during the 7th European Parliament.

In August 2009, Philippe de Villiers announced that the MPF would join the Liaison Committee for the Presidential Majority, which co-ordinates the member parties of the majority supporting the policies of President Nicolas Sarkozy.

=== Decline (2010s) ===
During the 2010s, the MPF gradually lost all its electoral representation. The party did not take part in the 2012 and 2017 presidential elections. Party leader Villiers expressed his personal support for Marine Le Pen in the 2017 presidential election. The party was dissolved by its secretary-general Patrick Louis on 28 June 2018.

== Ideology ==
The MPF was a souverainist party which supported the national independence of France within a Europe "of peoples and co-operation". Unlike the United Kingdom Independence Party, it did not support France's withdrawal from the EU but rather a massive overhaul of it. The MPF was a strong critic of what it saw as excessive bureaucracy and technocracy in the EU.

The MPF and Villers, mostly due to their views on Islam and Muslim immigration, have been labeled in world news media such as CNN, Der Spiegel, The Wall Street Journal, The Boston Globe, and The San Francisco Chronicle as "far right".

According to its electoral platform, its various proposals included:

=== European Union ===
- Restore the rule of national law over EU law.
- Ceasing negotiations over the accession of Turkey to the European Union, and begin a process of privileged partnership with Turkey and other Mediterranean countries.
- Allow the countries of Europe to form their own, independent foreign policies.
- Follow a policy of respect of national borders and control of immigration.
- Put the national Parliaments in the middle of European construction and giving them veto power on the vital interests of the people which they represent.
- Put the European Union and the euro at the service of the growth and employment.
- Found a European preference for industry and the services, as for agriculture.
- Opposition to the Lisbon Treaty and halting the ratification process.
- Draft a "fundamental treaty" of the European Union based on a free association of independent nations and peoples.

=== Economy ===
- Establishing a "European protectionism" with tariffs on external imports. Within France, it is more neoliberal in supporting lower taxes to encourage the growth of industries within France.
- End the 35-hour workweek
- Liberalization of the fixed retirement age (60)
- Maximum rate of taxation at 38%
- Repealing the solidarity tax on wealth (ISF)

=== Internal issues ===
- Referendum on the re-establishment of the death penalty
- Forbid the wearing of the hijab in public.
- Establishing a moratorium on constructing mosques in France.
- Abolition of the French Council of the Muslim Faith (CFCM)
- Opposition to same-sex marriage: constitutional amendment establishing marriage as between a man and a woman
- The party supports alternatives to abortion though it does not support forbidding it

== Organization ==
=== Leadership ===
Party leader		Time in office
1.	Philippe de Villiers	20 November 1994 – 28 June 2018

Secretary-General		Time in office
1.	Stéphane Buffetaut	1998 – 1999
2.	Thierry de La Perrière	1999 – 2003
3.	Guillaume Peltier	2003 – 2008
4.	Patrick Louis	2008 – 2018

=== Elected officials ===
The MPF elected some representatives, including two deputies (Véronique Besse and Dominique Souchet, part of Non-Inscrits), two senators (Bruno Retailleau and Philippe Darniche, part of RASNAG) and a MEP (Philippe de Villiers, member of the EFD).

The MPF controlled the general council of Vendée, where Villiers served as President of the General Council. It had 10 general councillors in Vendée in addition to one in the Morbihan (Quiberon), one in the Meuse (Charny-sur-Meuse) and two in the Vaucluse (Orange). It claimed 5 regional councillors, most of which were elected on FN lists in 2004.

=== Youth wing ===
The Youth for France (French: Jeunes pour la France, JPF) was founded in 2001 by Guillaume Peltier as the party's youth organisation. Its successive presidents included Peltier (2001–2006), Jean-Baptiste Doat (2006–2008), Thibaud Vincendeau (2008–2010), Christophe Bentz (2010–2011) and Pierre Meurin (2014–2018).

== Electoral performance ==
The MPF had little electoral clout and most of its support was concentrated in Philippe de Villiers' department of Vendée, his electoral stronghold. While most of his support drew on his status as a favourite son, Vendée is also a strongly Traditionalist Catholic department which maintains a sense of pride in the monarchist counter-revolution and the Chouans during the French Revolution. In the 2009 European election, Villiers' list won the department with 32.96% while polling only 4.8% nationally. In the 2004 European election the MPF won 38.63% and it won 31.9% in the 1999 elections and 34.75% in 1994. However, the MPF is weaker in the department in national elections – such as presidential votes. Philippe de Villiers, who had won 22.02% in his department in the 1995 presidential election (he also got first place) came in fourth place with 11.28% in the 2007 presidential election. His electoral base in the department is his constituency – Vendée's 4th constituency – in which he consistently does better than in the department as a whole.

His influence waned, however: through considered to be pro-EU in general, the department voted against the Maastricht Treaty in 1992 due to Villiers' influence, but it voted for the European Constitution in 2005. It was the only department to switch between a NO vote in 1992 and a YES vote in 2005.

The MPF was also strong in other departments, mostly those neighboring Vendée. In 2009, for example, Villiers' list won 14.26% in the Deux-Sèvres, a department which is also strongly Catholic. It also won 12.36% in Charente-Maritime, 10.39% in Maine-et-Loire, 9.79% in Charente, 9.29% in Vienne and 8.56% in Loire-Atlantique. Due to Jacques Bompard, it also polled 6.40% in the southeastern Vaucluse department.

=== Presidential ===
President of the French Republic
Election	Candidate	First round		Second round		Result
Election	Candidate	Votes	%	Votes	%	Result
1995	Philippe de Villiers	1,443,235	4.74%	-	-	Lost
2007	Philippe de Villiers	818,407	2.23%	-	-	Lost

=== Legislative ===
National Assembly
Election	Leader	Votes (first round)		Seats	
Election	Leader	No.	%	No.	±
1997	Philippe de Villiers	606,355	2.38%	2 / 577	▲2
2002	Philippe de Villiers	202,831	0.80%	1 / 577	▼1
2007	Philippe de Villiers	312,581	1.20%	2 / 577	▲1

=== European Parliament ===
European Parliament
Election year	Leader	Number of votes	% of overall vote	# of seats won
1994	Philippe de Villiers	2,404,105	12.34%	13
1999	Philippe de Villiers	2,304,285	13.05%	6
2004	Philippe de Villiers	1,145,839	6.67%	3
2009	Philippe de Villiers	826,357	4.80%	1

== See also ==
- List of political parties in France
- Politics of France
- Debout La France (another social conservative radical right-wing political party of France)
