= 1995 French presidential election =

- 23 April 1995 (first round); 7 May 1995 (second round)
- Turnout: 78.38% (first round); 79.66% (second round)
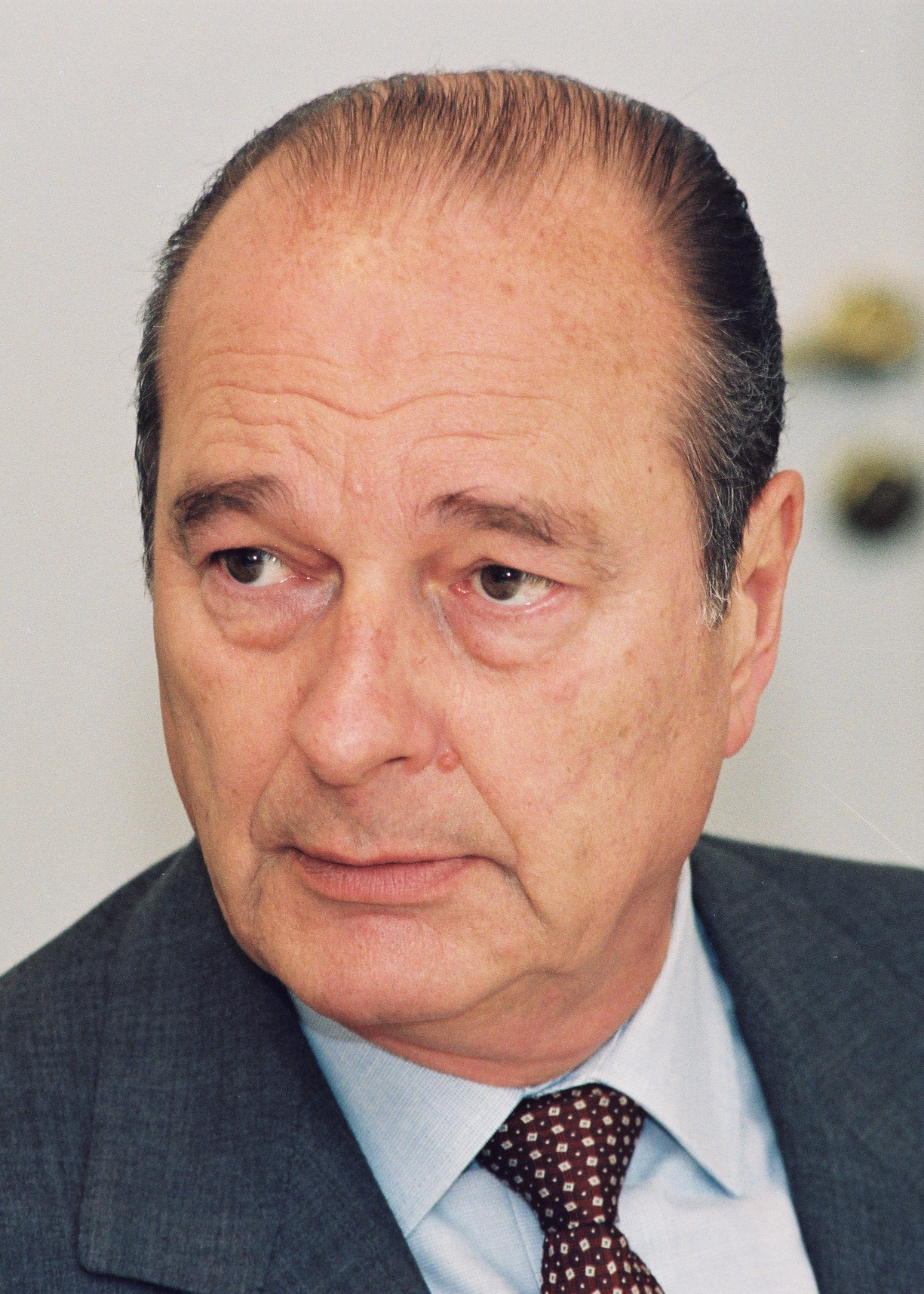

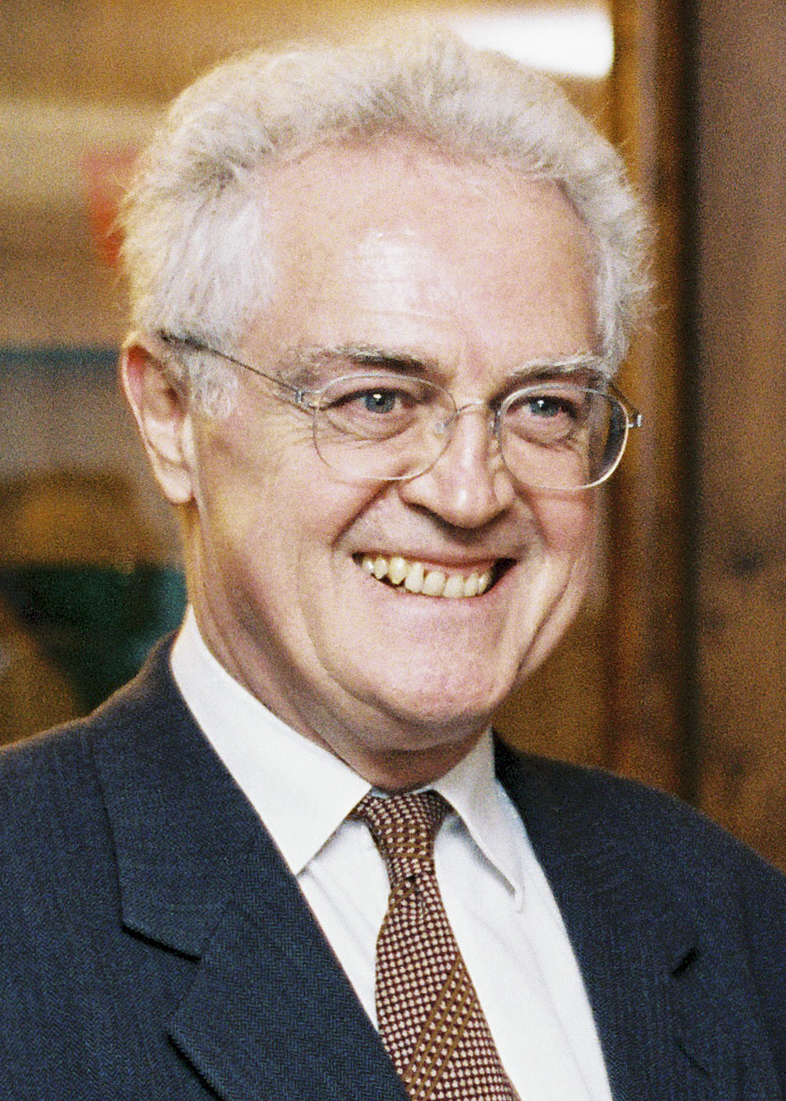
Nominee	Jacques Chirac	Lionel Jospin
Party	RPR	PS
Popular vote	15,763,027	14,180,644
Percentage	52.64%	47.36%
President before election
François Mitterrand
PS
Elected President
Jacques Chirac
RPR

Presidential elections were held in France on 23 April, with a second round on 7 May. Following his tenure as Mayor of Paris, Jacques Chirac launched his third campaign for the presidency of the French Republic. Campaigning heavily on the theme of healing the country's "social rift" (fracture sociale), Chirac faced a highly competitive field in the first round of voting, finishing slightly behind the Socialist Party candidate Lionel Jospin.

In the second-round runoff held, Jacques Chirac won the majority of the popular vote, defeating Jospin to claim the presidency. International media outlets heavily documented the shift in French political leadership. According to contemporary English news reports, Jacques Chirac, the conservative mayor of Paris, finally won France's presidency in his third attempt, defeating Lionel Jospin.

The outcome brought an end to 14 consecutive years of Socialist presidency under François Mitterrand, successfully shifting executive control of the state back to the center-right Gaullist coalition. Chirac was officially inaugurated as the fifth president of the French Fifth Republic on 17 May.

== Background ==
The Socialist incumbent president François Mitterrand, who had been in office since 1981, did not stand for a third term. He was 78, had terminal cancer, and his party had lost the 1993 French legislative election in a landslide defeat. Since then, he had been "cohabiting" with a right-wing cabinet led by Prime Minister Édouard Balladur, a member of the neo-Gaullist RPR party. Balladur had promised the RPR leader, Jacques Chirac, that he would not run for the presidency, but as polls showed him doing well and he had the support of many right-wing politicians, he decided to run. The competition within the right between Balladur and Chirac was a major feature of the campaign.

Meanwhile, the left was weakened by scandals and disappointments regarding Mitterrand's presidency along with the unemployment rate hovering around 10%. In June 1994, former Prime Minister Michel Rocard was dismissed as leader of the Socialist Party (PS) after the party's poor showing in the European Parliament elections. Then, Jacques Delors decided not to stand as a candidate because he disagreed with the re-alignment on the left orchestrated by new party leader Henri Emmanuelli. This left the field wide open for numerous potential candidacies: among those who are known to have considered a run, or were strongly urged by others, are Jack Lang, Pierre Joxe, Laurent Fabius, Ségolène Royal and Robert Badinter. Former party leader and education minister Lionel Jospin was chosen by PS members as the party's candidate in a primary election pitting him against Emmanuelli. He promised to restore the credibility and moral reputation of his party, but his chances of winning were seen as being thin. The economy was also still struggling with a depression which began in mid-1990, and the government's policies were widely blamed for both the recession and its slow recovery.

The French Communist Party (PCF) tried to stop its electoral decline. Its new leader Robert Hue campaigned against "king money" and wanted to represent a renewed communism. He was faced with competition for the far left vote by the Trotskyist candidacy of Arlette Laguiller, who ran for the fourth time. Both of these candidates had a better result than their parties had in 1988, but came nowhere near being able to participate in the next round. In choosing Dominique Voynet, the Greens opted for their integration with the left.

On the far-right, Jean-Marie Le Pen tried to repeat his surprising result that he obtained in the 1988 presidential election. His main rival for the far-right vote was Philippe de Villiers, candidate of the eurosceptic parliamentary right. Both candidates primarily focused on the country’s financial situation.

In January 1995, when he announced his candidacy, Balladur was the favourite of the political right. According to the SOFRES polls institute, he held an advantage of 14 points over Chirac (32% against 18% for the first round). He took advantage of his "positive assessment" as Prime Minister and advocated a moderately liberal economic policy. Chirac denounced the "social fracture" and criticised the "dominant thought", targeting Balladur. Chirac argued that "the pay slip is not the enemy of employment". Indeed, unemployment was the main theme of the campaign. From the start of March, Chirac gained ground on Balladur in the polls. Another factor that contributed to Balladur's fall in popularity was the revelation of a bugging scandal which had implicated Balladur.

Chirac's campaign slogan was "La France pour tous" ("France for everyone"); Balladur's "Believe in France"; and Jospin's "A clear vote for a more just France".

== Opinion polls ==
=== First round ===
Polling firm	Fieldwork date	Laguiller LO	Hue PCF	Voynet LV	Delors PS	Jospin PS	Rocard PS	Giscard UDF	Balladur RPR	Chirac RPR	de Villiers MPF	Le Pen FN	Cheminade FNS
Sofres	20-21 Apr 1995	5%	9.5%	4%	—	20.5%	—	—	16.5%	24%	6%	14%	0.5%
Sofres	13-14 Apr 1995	5%	8.5%	3.5%	—	21%	—	—	16%	26%	6.5%	13%	0.5%
BVA	12-14 Apr 1995	5%	10%	4%	—	19%	—	—	16%	26%	6%	14%	0%
Sofres	8-10 Apr 1995	4.5%	8.5%	3%	—	21%	—	—	19%	26%	5%	13%	0%
Sofres	4-5 Apr 1995	4.5%	8%	3.5%	—	22%	—	—	20%	24%	5.5%	12%	0.5%
Sofres	25-27 Mar 1995	3.5%	8%	3.5%	—	21%	—	—	18%	26%	6.5%	13%	0%
Sofres	21-22 Mar 1995	3%	8.5%	2.5%	—	22%	—	—	17%	26%	7%	13%	—
Sofres	11-13 Mar 1995	3.5%	8%	2.5%	—	20%	—	—	20%	27%	6.5%	12%	—
Sofres	8-9 Mar 1995	4%	9%	3.5%	—	21%	—	—	20%	24%	7.5%	10.5%	—
Sofres	21-23 Feb 1995	3%	7%	5%	—	24%	—	—	23.5%	19%	7.5%	11%	—
Sofres	7-9 Feb 1995	3%	7%	4%	—	22.5%	—	—	28%	17.5%	6.5%	10.5%	—
Sofres	24-26 Jan 1995	3%	7%	3%	—	17%	—	—	32%	18%	7%	12%	—
Sofres	10-12 Jan 1995	2.5%	6%	4%	—	20%	—	—	29%	17%	9%	11.5%	—
Sofres	26-28 Dec 1994	3.5%	6%	3.5%	22%	—	—	10%	25%	14%	4%	12%	—
Sofres	5-7 Dec 1994	3%	5%	3%	32%	—	—	5%	25%	12%	5%	10%	—
Sofres	22-24 Nov 1994	3.5%	5%	3%	31%	—	—	5%	25%	15%	5%	8%	—
Sofres	5-9 Nov 1994	3.5%	5%	3%	26%	—	—	4.5%	28%	18%	4%	9%	—
Sofres	4-6 Oct 1994	4%	5%	1.5%	29.5%	—	—	6%	28%	14%	3%	9%	—
Sofres	6-8 Sep 1994	2.5%	3.5%	2%	27%	—	—	5%	30%	16%	4%	10%	—
Sofres	2-5 Jul 1994	3%	4%	4%	26%	—	—	8%	28%	16%	—	11%	—
Sofres	7–9 May 1994	2.5%	6%	4.5%	—	—	26%	6%	28%	17%	—	10%	—
Sofres	24-25 Mar 1994	2%	5%	4%	—	—	25%	7%	29%	17%	—	11%	—
Sofres	3-5 Mar 1994	2.5%	4.5%	4%	24%	—	—	7%	33%	14%	—	11%	—

== Results ==
Candidate	Party	First round		Second round	
Candidate	Party	Votes	%	Votes	%
Lionel Jospin	Socialist Party	7,097,786	23.30	14,180,644	47.36
Jacques Chirac	Rally for the Republic	6,348,375	20.84	15,763,027	52.64
Édouard Balladur	Rally for the Republic	5,658,796	18.58		
Jean-Marie Le Pen	National Front	4,570,838	15.00		
Robert Hue	French Communist Party	2,632,460	8.64		
Arlette Laguiller	Workers Struggle	1,615,552	5.30		
Philippe de Villiers	Movement for France	1,443,186	4.74		
Dominique Voynet	The Greens	1,010,681	3.32		
Jacques Cheminade	Federation for a New Solidarity	84,959	0.28		
Total		30,462,633	100.00	29,943,671	100.00
Valid votes		30,462,633	97.18	29,943,671	94.03
Invalid/blank votes		883,161	2.82	1,902,148	5.97
Total votes		31,345,794	100.00	31,845,819	100.00
Registered voters/turnout		39,992,912	78.38	39,976,944	79.66
Source: Constitutional Court, Constitutional Court

=== First round ===
Lionel Jospin won the first round, in what appeared to be an electoral recovery for the Socialist Party. His right-wing challenger for the runoff vote on 7 May was Jacques Chirac and not Edouard Balladur. Defeated, Balladur endorsed the RPR candidate. Jean-Marie Le Pen repeated his good result of the previous presidential election.

==== By department ====
Department	Jospin	Chirac	Balladur	Le Pen	Hue	Laguiller	de Villiers	Voynet	Cheminade	Electorate	Votes	Valid votes	Invalid votes
Paris	219,254	271,278	139,869	77,909	39,469	40,693	21,923	30,608	1,658	1,168,036	856,512	842,661	13,851
Seine-et-Marne	108,507	116,185	79,488	93,947	42,074	28,253	23,642	17,195	1,297	691,005	522,600	510,588	12,012
Yvelines	132,703	161,243	121,607	85,656	39,549	30,432	27,560	21,185	1,458	822,940	634,622	621,393	13,229
Essonne	123,720	116,811	79,700	73,534	46,645	30,757	20,190	20,068	1,194	683,626	524,787	512,619	12,168
Hauts-de-Seine	139,497	160,605	116,410	70,458	47,762	28,529	20,344	19,714	1,333	823,909	616,102	604,652	11,450
Seine-Saint- Denis	113,567	96,629	57,258	91,176	68,395	28,108	13,924	15,314	1,118	683,919	496,106	485,489	10,617
Val-de-Marne	120,799	119,624	76,404	68,131	64,067	26,819	16,355	17,594	1,085	692,561	522,817	510,878	11,939
Val-de Oise	100,551	99,713	67,342	79,103	48,178	24,251	17,093	14,822	1,058	611,098	462,112	452,111	10,001
Ardennes	36,149	26,091	26,217	26,836	14,086	7,956	6,985	4,094	377	194,299	152,424	148,791	3,633
Aube	30,342	31,585	28,672	27,567	11,834	7,135	8,998	4,190	440	192,789	155,156	150,763	4,393
Marne	57,380	58,141	52,591	49,161	20,825	16,240	14,655	9,204	802	366,488	285,862	278,999	6,863
Haute-Marne	23,394	21,843	19,891	22,624	7,689	5,899	5,547	3,923	387	145,981	114,832	111,197	3,635
Aisne	71,700	53,422	45,951	52,026	32,132	17,053	13,819	7,136	845	371,939	301,990	294,084	7,906
Oise	80,689	76,390	62,055	79,415	35,493	23,270	17,822	11,516	1,111	488,437	397,437	387,761	9,676
Somme	71,669	59,293	53,438	47,928	39,081	18,431	16,142	7,656	876	391,302	323,792	314,514	9,278
Eure	58,464	55,050	52,784	51,898	24,111	16,043	14,790	8,560	871	359,333	290,809	282,571	8,238
Seine-Maritime	152,328	109,160	117,988	101,722	74,903	41,689	24,811	19,842	1,687	831,766	662,374	644,130	18,244
Cher	36,727	35,663	31,672	23,823	24,234	9,562	8,671	5,064	559	228,986	182,025	175,975	6,050
Eure-et-Loir	45,602	40,155	43,443	38,883	14,488	10,822	13,194	6,281	522	273,171	219,421	213,390	6,031
Indre	33,365	29,652	23,742	18,182	14,925	7,212	8,172	4,073	457	180,705	145,544	139,780	5,764
Indre-et-Loire	70,285	51,617	60,546	37,033	21,717	15,172	17,904	10,349	826	369,275	295,109	285,449	9,660
Loir-et-Cher	40,834	31,800	36,165	27,653	15,370	8,879	13,288	5,540	497	228,208	186,321	180,026	6,295
Loiret	65,197	63,637	62,526	49,198	25,107	15,641	18,192	10,428	918	395,218	320,426	310,844	9,582
Calvados	81,989	68,955	71,801	42,680	25,102	23,061	17,158	12,548	1,025	437,282	353,904	344,319	9,585
Manche	56,155	66,848	67,254	30,794	16,162	15,740	14,786	9,424	925	351,768	285,914	278,088	7,826
Orne	33,657	39,387	36,662	25,161	9,577	9,008	10,051	5,860	523	213,690	174,859	169,886	4,973
Côte-d'Or	60,470	53,539	47,943	40,468	15,882	13,118	13,247	10,159	628	326,948	262,497	255,454	7,043
Nièvre	40,340	24,237	21,242	15,959	16,991	6,026	5,663	3,522	369	173,997	138,823	134,349	4,474
Saône-et-Loire	75,288	61,438	57,796	40,069	27,620	14,634	15,874	9,039	802	399,842	314,437	302,560	11,877
Yonne	37,089	36,095	34,038	30,406	14,581	8,828	10,688	6,118	557	230,305	183,969	178,400	5,569
Nord	302,492	219,467	228,281	236,730	155,288	73,270	52,639	30,965	3,145	1,677,860	1,337,941	1,302,277	35,664
Pas-de-Calais	201,379	135,223	127,766	121,652	111,222	49,284	34,052	17,247	2,031	1,016,315	828,074	799,856	28,218
Meurthe-et-Moselle	85,039	63,832	65,107	65,291	30,039	23,313	14,177	12,457	977	470,685	369,781	360,232	9,549
Meuse	23,388	19,121	23,467	21,741	6,558	5,853	5,572	3,988	351	140,834	113,257	110,039	3,218
Moselle	101,858	90,174	107,475	125,065	30,091	33,762	18,763	16,295	1,516	690,316	540,547	524,999	15,548
Vosges	47,960	43,094	39,203	43,539	12,413	12,064	11,190	7,680	723	278,909	226,002	217,866	8,136
Bas-Rhin	84,491	84,046	124,954	130,548	14,429	24,227	21,725	19,291	1,618	653,671	518,931	505,329	13,602
Haut-Rhin	60,712	59,413	86,111	88,100	12,657	17,980	15,530	13,643	1,132	458,432	365,774	355,278	10,496
Doubs	64,277	53,716	47,708	39,923	13,921	14,003	12,180	12,852	673	325,938	266,668	259,253	7,415
Jura	30,638	24,270	28,339	21,646	11,533	7,435	7,581	8,227	376	177,806	144,987	140,045	4,942
Haute-Saône	33,511	26,407	24,309	22,440	8,804	6,755	6,646	5,058	381	170,138	139,347	134,311	5,036
Territoire de Belfort	17,835	12,548	10,678	12,965	5,086	4,212	2,529	3,132	154	87,668	71,356	69,139	2,217
Loire-Atlantique	157,015	111,077	125,494	57,668	43,141	37,195	41,818	25,261	1,665	768,340	618,958	600,334	18,624
Maine-et-Loire	81,544	78,077	97,763	39,333	21,338	20,837	34,982	14,721	1,153	489,715	404,960	389,748	15,212
Mayenne	32,615	39,104	44,224	15,645	7,789	8,513	10,628	6,210	529	206,397	171,952	165,257	6,695
Sarthe	68,714	54,907	63,289	33,445	25,365	17,368	17,897	10,682	937	378,616	304,510	292,604	11,906
Vendée	62,543	58,462	64,826	23,460	15,254	14,508	70,725	10,481	892	394,215	332,278	321,151	11,127
Côtes-d'Armor	94,522	65,565	68,951	30,282	38,386	18,807	12,617	12,760	847	420,696	351,393	342,737	8,656
Finistère	130,415	108,697	105,061	45,911	37,211	30,313	19,188	20,970	1,200	625,550	510,067	498,966	11,101
Ille-et-Vilaine	118,780	97,480	104,104	41,594	29,204	30,188	20,762	20,062	1,150	581,428	476,907	463,324	13,583
Morbihan	86,034	75,872	88,820	52,369	27,122	20,296	15,436	13,229	858	472,281	389,421	380,036	9,385
Charente	55,088	41,353	32,035	20,030	18,430	10,284	12,202	6,108	636	254,536	203,521	196,166	7,355
Charente-Maritime	74,907	60,687	58,549	34,327	25,667	14,721	23,688	9,999	953	397,086	313,519	303,498	10,021
Deux-Sèvres	51,890	44,343	41,885	15,008	11,613	11,600	18,411	7,848	676	259,259	211,650	203,274	8,376
Vienne	55,743	47,870	40,066	23,002	18,124	11,822	13,497	8,538	696	281,401	227,807	219,358	8,449
Dordogne	60,811	61,708	33,680	21,268	34,353	10,620	12,352	7,213	719	303,089	251,837	242,724	9,113
Gironde	179,050	126,026	114,546	82,612	54,762	38,431	29,772	19,471	1,747	827,836	664,379	646,417	17,962
Landes	62,598	41,472	34,299	17,425	18,660	8,294	8,228	4,340	520	244,917	202,458	195,836	6,622
Lot-et-Garonne	41,867	36,091	29,377	26,345	19,010	8,908	11,231	5,384	542	224,985	185,011	178,755	6,256
Pyrénées-Atlantiques	85,451	76,946	70,655	32,100	23,706	18,642	13,326	12,176	927	432,701	345,280	333,929	11,351
Ariège	28,938	14,276	12,352	8,984	10,665	4,263	2,833	3,004	287	108,226	88,265	85,602	2,663
Aveyron	42,115	44,609	36,077	14,586	11,874	8,101	7,643	5,881	518	212,792	177,548	171,404	6,144
Haute-Garonne	164,580	94,453	82,702	65,200	40,103	31,249	17,847	18,877	1,387	654,466	532,483	516,398	16,085
Gers	31,813	22,905	19,008	10,059	8,991	5,202	6,054	3,406	389	136,625	111,988	107,827	4,161
Lot	31,018	26,817	14,772	8,504	11,552	5,483	4,641	3,969	320	131,509	110,895	107,076	3,819
Hautes-Pyrénées	37,936	26,807	23,560	12,559	16,206	7,099	5,065	4,251	395	173,682	138,861	133,878	4,983
Tarn	58,446	40,762	36,600	26,860	16,691	10,366	10,200	6,939	613	257,286	215,538	207,477	8,061
Tarn-et-Garonne	31,669	24,192	19,381	19,125	9,391	5,851	7,532	3,748	405	151,233	125,216	121,294	3,922
Corrèze	30,869	76,632	7,170	7,122	21,729	5,323	3,035	3,217	339	185,134	158,857	155,436	3,421
Creuse	20,091	27,984	8,900	5,694	9,606	3,453	2,811	2,240	231	105,801	83,764	81,010	2,754
Haute-Vienne	57,533	60,450	22,506	15,894	28,891	10,429	7,051	6,617	543	263,199	218,477	209,914	8,563
Ain	49,970	46,891	48,264	48,417	14,999	11,918	13,118	9,534	686	314,259	251,533	243,797	7,736
Ardèche	38,151	30,055	33,326	23,548	16,547	8,986	8,372	6,524	531	211,247	171,292	166,040	5,252
Drôme	53,162	38,526	42,532	39,438	18,543	11,957	12,475	9,845	714	292,297	234,054	227,192	6,862
Isère	131,417	82,311	93,629	91,156	45,042	31,264	22,587	22,888	1,337	672,788	536,655	521,631	15,024
Loire	76,096	65,906	70,354	78,674	31,573	18,858	18,296	12,544	949	486,507	384,041	373,250	10,791
Rhône	156,922	133,847	149,259	138,401	47,464	36,871	30,993	27,389	1,828	922,695	739,828	722,974	16,854
Savoie	41,392	36,186	39,398	32,644	15,399	10,275	9,895	8,325	524	249,352	199,399	194,038	5,361
Haute-Savoie	55,312	59,826	73,852	49,055	15,007	14,656	16,087	13,849	871	385,732	307,167	298,515	8,652
Allier	45,190	44,190	34,255	22,928	31,960	9,763	9,650	5,654	557	264,005	211,875	204,147	7,728
Cantal	20,964	40,848	14,046	7,092	6,816	4,112	3,390	2,061	339	125,662	102,301	99,668	2,633
Haute-Loire	25,528	28,843	24,888	19,880	8,388	6,867	6,822	4,184	410	159,947	130,280	125,810	4,470
Puy-de-Dôme	83,082	73,590	54,978	36,019	31,262	22,638	13,487	11,320	973	415,645	339,055	327,349	11,706
Aude	56,613	33,039	24,997	24,643	21,137	8,887	7,107	4,901	459	225,975	186,986	181,783	5,203
Gard	70,874	53,159	53,776	66,729	42,183	16,973	14,737	9,823	793	420,294	338,036	329,047	8,989
Hérault	109,366	80,144	73,038	85,843	46,348	23,620	18,636	14,710	998	576,736	464,408	452,703	11,705
Lozère	9,645	12,594	11,423	4,512	3,300	1,937	1,847	1,522	140	57,701	48,161	46,920	1,241
Pyrénées-Orientales	47,587	39,282	32,454	40,187	21,987	10,084	9,000	5,600	453	266,855	212,069	206,634	5,435
Alpes-de-Haute-Provence	18,169	14,709	13,585	12,642	8,932	4,211	4,186	3,353	269	103,874	82,761	80,056	2,705
Hautes-Alpes	15,005	13,862	13,990	8,711	5,897	3,505	3,743	3,413	229	88,719	70,725	68,355	2,370
Alpes-Maritimes	82,646	113,545	104,788	113,543	34,273	18,662	22,786	13,724	1,064	680,770	514,382	505,031	9,351
Bouches-du-Rhône	169,139	140,160	147,713	177,779	98,030	41,462	30,291	23,287	1,896	1,108,942	849,671	829,757	19,914
Var	77,389	85,284	94,382	100,004	36,882	18,704	22,284	11,519	991	601,391	457,528	447,439	10,089
Vaucluse	51,214	42,121	44,945	58,402	21,603	11,793	13,534	8,343	694	325,284	259,867	252,649	7,218
Corse-du-Sud	9,733	16,381	12,165	6,251	4,906	1,636	1,222	1,427	145	81,100	54,852	53,866	986
Haute-Corse	14,502	20,199	11,634	6,321	6,533	1,965	1,423	1,569	167	98,947	65,745	64,313	1,432
Source: European Election Database

==== By region ====
Region	Jospin	Chirac	Balladur	Le Pen	Hue	Laguiller	de Villiers	Voynet	Cheminade	Electorate	Votes	Valid votes	Invalid votes
Île de France	1,058,598	1,142,088	738,078	639,914	396,139	237,842	161,031	156,500	10,201	6,177,094	4,635,658	4,540,391	95,267
Champagne-Ardenne	147,265	137,660	127,371	126,188	54,434	37,230	36,185	21,411	2,006	899,557	708,274	689,750	18,524
Picardy	224,058	189,105	161,444	179,369	106,706	58,754	47,783	26,308	2,832	1,251,678	1,023,219	996,359	26,860
Upper Normandy	210,792	164,210	170,772	153,620	99,014	57,732	39,601	28,402	2,558	1,191,099	953,183	926,701	26,482
Centre	292,010	252,524	258,094	194,772	115,841	67,288	79,421	41,735	3,779	1,675,563	1,348,846	1,305,464	43,382
Lower Normandy	171,801	175,190	175,717	98,635	50,841	47,809	41,995	27,832	2,473	1,002,740	814,677	792,293	22,384
Bourgogne	213,187	175,309	161,019	126,902	75,074	42,606	45,472	28,838	2,356	1,131,092	899,726	870,763	28,963
Nord-Pas-de-Calais	503,871	354,690	356,047	358,382	266,510	122,554	86,691	48,212	5,176	2,694,175	2,166,015	2,102,133	63,882
Lorraine	258,245	216,221	235,252	255,636	79,101	74,992	49,702	40,420	3,567	1,580,744	1,249,587	1,213,136	36,451
Alsace	145,203	143,459	211,065	218,648	27,086	42,207	37,255	32,934	2,750	1,112,103	884,705	860,607	24,098
Franche-Comté	146,261	116,941	111,034	96,974	39,344	32,405	28,936	29,269	1,584	761,550	622,358	602,748	19,610
Pays de la Loire	402,431	341,627	395,596	169,551	112,887	98,421	176,050	67,355	5,176	2,237,283	1,832,658	1,769,094	63,564
Brittany	429,751	347,614	366,936	170,156	131,923	99,604	68,003	67,021	4,055	2,099,955	1,727,788	1,685,063	42,725
Poitou-Charentes	237,628	194,253	172,535	92,367	73,834	48,427	67,798	32,493	2,961	1,192,282	956,497	922,296	34,201
Aquitaine	429,777	342,243	282,557	179,750	150,491	84,895	74,909	48,584	4,455	2,033,528	1,648,965	1,597,661	51,304
Midi-Pyrénées	426,515	294,821	244,452	165,877	125,473	77,614	61,815	50,075	4,314	1,825,819	1,500,794	1,450,956	49,838
Limousin	108,493	165,066	38,576	28,710	60,226	19,205	12,897	12,074	1,113	554,134	461,098	446,360	14,738
Rhône-Alpes	602,422	493,548	550,614	501,333	204,574	144,785	131,823	110,898	7,440	3,534,877	2,823,969	2,747,437	76,532
Auvergne	174,764	187,471	128,167	85,919	78,426	43,380	33,349	23,219	2,279	965,259	783,511	756,974	26,537
Languedoc-Roussillon	294,085	218,218	195,688	221,914	134,955	61,501	51,327	36,556	2,843	1,547,561	1,249,660	1,217,087	32,573
Provence-Alpes-Côte d'Azur	413,562	409,681	419,403	471,081	205,617	98,337	96,824	63,639	5,143	2,908,980	2,234,934	2,183,287	51,647
Corsica	24,235	36,580	23,799	12,572	11,439	3,601	2,645	2,996	312	180,047	120,597	118,179	2,418
Source: European Election Database

=== Second round ===
During the TV debate between the two finalists, they disagreed about the presidential term. Jospin wanted to reduce it to five years whereas Chirac was in favour of the seven-year term. The PS candidate responded: "The choice is five years with me or seven years with Jacques Chirac, which will be very long". Jospin was appointed Prime Minister from 1997 to 2002 during Chirac's first term. Eventually, the presidential term was reduced to five years after the 2002 election.

Chirac was elected President and Balladur resigned as prime minister. Foreign minister Alain Juppé succeeded him.

==== By department ====
Department	Jacques Chirac	Lionel Jospin	Electorate	Votes	Valid votes	Invalid votes
Paris	524,619	347,331	1,167,533	904,069	871,950	32,119
Seine-et-Marne	284,748	228,347	691,031	548,131	513,095	35,036
Yvelines	385,227	250,027	822,619	669,433	635,254	34,179
Essonne	277,012	242,705	683,504	551,623	519,717	31,906
Hauts-de-Seine	364,214	252,845	823,940	646,277	617,059	29,218
Seine-Saint-Denis	228,621	246,125	683,704	508,634	474,746	33,888
Val-de Marne	271,531	240,906	692,107	542,740	512,437	30,303
Val-de Oise	243,823	209,551	611,697	482,980	453,374	29,606
Ardennes	68,689	78,353	194,247	155,808	147,042	8,766
Aube	81,179	65,580	192,753	156,956	146,759	10,197
Marne	147,230	122,748	366,184	287,291	269,978	17,313
Haute-Marne	56,716	51,991	145,957	116,799	108,707	8,092
Aisne	130,735	156,883	371,936	305,113	287,618	17,495
Oise	188,559	180,301	488,261	396,020	368,860	27,160
Somme	144,034	163,254	390,933	326,005	307,288	18,717
Eure	144,194	128,025	359,154	290,941	272,219	18,722
Seine-Maritime	288,597	328,426	831,570	658,378	617,023	41,355
Cher	86,428	84,204	228,867	182,550	170,632	11,918
Eure-et-Loir	111,404	93,864	273,150	219,653	205,268	14,385
Indre	68,959	69,784	180,699	148,329	138,743	9,586
Indre-et-Loire	140,376	137,157	369,195	294,817	277,533	17,284
Loir-et-Cher	90,219	83,952	228,164	186,533	174,171	12,362
Loiret	168,406	131,798	394,869	321,226	300,204	21,022
Calvados	172,146	164,646	437,163	354,498	336,792	17,706
Manche	160,911	112,406	351,735	287,095	273,317	13,778
Orne	95,822	70,497	213,586	175,720	166,319	9,401
Côte-d'Or	135,335	114,394	326,912	265,031	249,729	15,302
Nièvre	57,633	76,563	173,969	142,234	134,196	8,038
Saône-et-Loire	154,044	145,797	399,705	319,444	299,841	19,603
Yonne	95,791	78,932	230,230	186,696	174,723	11,973
Nord	573,136	664,653	1,677,826	1,324,163	1,237,789	86,374
Pas-de-Calais	328,642	440,736	1,016,147	823,739	769,378	54,361
Meurthe-et-Moselle	167,613	181,544	470,561	372,664	349,157	23,507
Meuse	56,099	51,178	140,745	114,717	107,277	7,440
Moselle	264,197	248,410	707,157	553,826	512,607	41,219
Vosges	108,887	102,807	278,847	228,285	211,694	16,591
Bas-Rhin	275,203	191,484	653,633	507,947	466,687	41,260
Haut-Rhin	188,188	140,489	458,381	359,460	328,677	30,783
Doubs	133,641	121,359	325,780	270,727	255,000	15,727
Jura	71,589	65,324	177,773	147,003	136,913	10,090
Haute-Saône	67,334	66,303	170,055	143,227	133,637	9,590
Territoire de Belfort	32,449	34,326	87,640	73,406	66,775	6,631
Loire-Atlantique	292,077	288,239	768,116	612,654	580,316	32,338
Maine-et-Loire	214,468	161,865	489,674	399,255	376,333	22,922
Mayenne	95,580	65,081	206,353	169,559	160,661	8,898
Sarthe	140,184	144,695	378,348	302,668	284,879	17,789
Vendée	188,222	122,912	394,169	328,804	311,134	17,670
Côtes-d'Armor	157,290	185,233	420,460	357,790	342,523	15,267
Finistère	253,843	242,305	625,020	517,951	496,148	21,803
Ille-et-Vilaine	231,929	221,177	581,508	474,087	453,106	20,981
Morbihan	215,038	194,454	525,396	430,675	409,492	21,183
Charente	91,694	103,519	254,492	205,902	195,213	10,689
Charente Maritime	156,135	146,040	396,990	319,465	302,175	17,290
Deux-Sèvres	106,494	96,399	259,241	213,371	202,893	10,478
Vienne	109,371	107,920	281,388	229,491	217,291	12,200
Dordogne	122,482	122,408	302,916	259,581	244,890	14,691
Gironde	311,853	327,351	827,744	677,256	639,204	38,052
Landes	93,303	103,989	244,719	207,843	197,292	10,551
Lot-et-Garonne	92,025	84,746	224,828	189,530	176,771	12,759
Pyrénées-Atlantiques	182,017	155,693	432,464	356,632	337,710	18,922
Ariège	34,357	51,182	108,169	90,677	85,539	5,138
Aveyron	96,496	76,209	212,698	181,207	172,705	8,502
Haute-Garonne	229,089	274,029	654,471	533,125	503,118	30,007
Gers	53,646	55,345	136,479	115,520	108,991	6,529
Lot	49,472	53,351	124,755	108,220	102,823	5,397
Hautes-Pyrénées	62,243	71,373	173,648	141,849	133,616	8,233
Tarn	101,019	103,314	284,805	218,060	204,333	13,727
Tarn-et-Garonne	61,045	58,829	151,138	127,638	119,874	7,764
Corrèze	95,569	60,168	185,044	162,041	155,737	6,304
Creuse	44,613	38,553	105,775	87,043	83,166	3,877
Haute-Vienne	99,912	107,691	263,175	220,556	207,603	12,953
Ain	134,783	99,920	314,136	251,562	234,703	16,859
Ardèche	84,836	79,487	211,198	175,147	164,323	10,824
Drôme	117,174	104,649	292,163	237,701	221,823	15,878
Isère	243,700	247,332	662,221	525,641	491,032	34,609
Loire	195,428	156,951	486,481	378,779	352,379	26,400
Rhône	394,783	286,757	922,551	726,554	681,540	45,014
Savoie	105,127	82,356	249,228	199,661	187,483	12,178
Haute-Savoie	179,125	109,963	385,590	308,045	289,088	18,957
Allier	100,183	101,223	263,964	215,301	201,406	13,895
Cantal	64,431	37,935	125,641	105,987	102,366	3,621
Haute-Loire	71,981	52,655	159,891	132,761	124,636	8,125
Puy-de-Dôme	165,484	158,254	415,519	344,159	323,738	20,421
Aude	79,299	99,411	225,831	190,801	178,710	12,091
Gard	160,972	154,201	420,214	341,529	315,173	26,356
Hérault	225,030	215,525	576,596	472,265	440,555	31,710
Lozère	28,978	18,179	57,682	49,377	47,157	2,220
Pyrénées-Orientales	104,700	97,557	266,821	216,926	202,257	14,669
Alpes-de Haute-Provence	41,460	38,183	103,853	85,485	79,643	5,842
Haute- Alpes	37,372	30,616	88,680	72,425	67,988	4,437
Alpes-Maritimes	321,442	169,487	680,821	522,626	490,929	31,697
Bouches-du-Rôhne	434,237	363,114	1,108,867	860,890	797,351	63,539
Var	269,612	168,118	601,342	471,300	437,730	33,570
Vaucluse	135,336	106,977	325,230	263,589	242,313	21,276
Corse-du-Sud	36,424	22,203	80,982	60,693	58,627	2,066
Haute-Corse	41,108	30,726	98,873	74,264	71,834	2,430
Source: European Election Database

==== By region ====
Region	Jacques Chirac	Lionel Jospin	Electorate	Votes	Valid votes	Invalid votes
Île de France	2,579,795	2,017,837	6,176,135	4,853,887	4,597,632	256,255
Champagne-Ardenne	353,814	318,672	899,141	716,854	672,486	44,368
Picardie	463,328	500,438	1,251,130	1,027,138	963,766	63,372
Haute-Normandie	432,791	456,451	1,190,724	949,319	889,242	60,077
Centre	665,792	600,759	1,674,944	1,353,108	1,266,551	86,557
Basse-Normandie	428,879	347,549	1,002,484	817,313	776,428	40,885
Bourgogne	442,803	415,686	1,130,816	913,405	858,489	54,916
Nord - Pas-de-Calais	901,778	1,105,389	2,693,973	2,147,902	2,007,167	140,735
Lorraine	596,796	583,939	1,597,310	1,269,492	1,180,735	88,757
Alsace	463,391	331,973	1,112,014	867,407	795,364	72,043
Franche-Comté	305,013	287,312	761,248	634,363	592,325	42,038
Pays de la Loire	930,531	782,792	2,236,660	1,812,940	1,713,323	99,617
Bretagne	858,100	843,169	2,152,384	1,780,503	1,701,269	79,234
Poitou-Charentes	463,694	453,878	1,192,111	968,229	917,572	50,657
Aquitaine	801,680	794,187	2,032,671	1,690,842	1,595,867	94,975
Midi-Pyrénées	687,367	743,632	1,846,163	1,516,296	1,430,999	85,297
Limousin	240,094	206,412	553,994	469,640	446,506	23,134
Rhône-Alpes	1,454,956	1,167,415	3,523,568	2,803,090	2,622,371	180,719
Auvergne	402,079	350,067	965,015	798,208	752,146	46,062
Languedoc-Roussillon	598,979	584,873	1,547,144	1,270,898	1,183,852	87,046
Provence-Alpes-Côte d'Azur	1,239,459	876,495	2,908,793	2,276,315	2,115,954	160,361
Corse	77,532	52,929	179,855	134,957	130,461	4,496
Source: European Election Database

== See also ==
- President of France
- Politics of France
- French presidential elections under the Fifth Republic
- Angolagate
