= Joël Sarlot =

French politician (1946– 2017)

Joël Sarlot (5 July 1946 – 10 December 2017) was a French politician and veterinarian.

Born on 5 July 1946 in Belfort, Sarlot trained as a veterinarian, and later moved to Nalliers, Vendée. He was a member of the Union for French Democracy and later joined the Movement for France. Sarlot was first elected to the Vendée General Council in 1985 and served until 2015. In 1993, he was seated in the National Assembly for the first time. Sarlot was reelected in 1997, and 2002. However, his 2007 electoral win was invalidated by the Constitutional Council. Sarlot was named an alternate to the Assembly by his successor Dominique Souchet, but campaigned for the seat outright in 2012, losing by approximately 1,300 votes to Hugues Fourage. Additionally, Sarlot served as president of the Pays-de-l'Hermenault federation (Communauté de communes) from its establishment in 1996 to its merger with Pays de Fontenay in 2016. He actively promoted tourism in Vendée, leading the department's tourism committee until 2013. Sarlot resigned as deputy mayor of Saint-Laurent-de-la-Salle in 2017. He died on 10 December 2017, aged 71.
