= Véronique Besse =

French politician (born 1963)

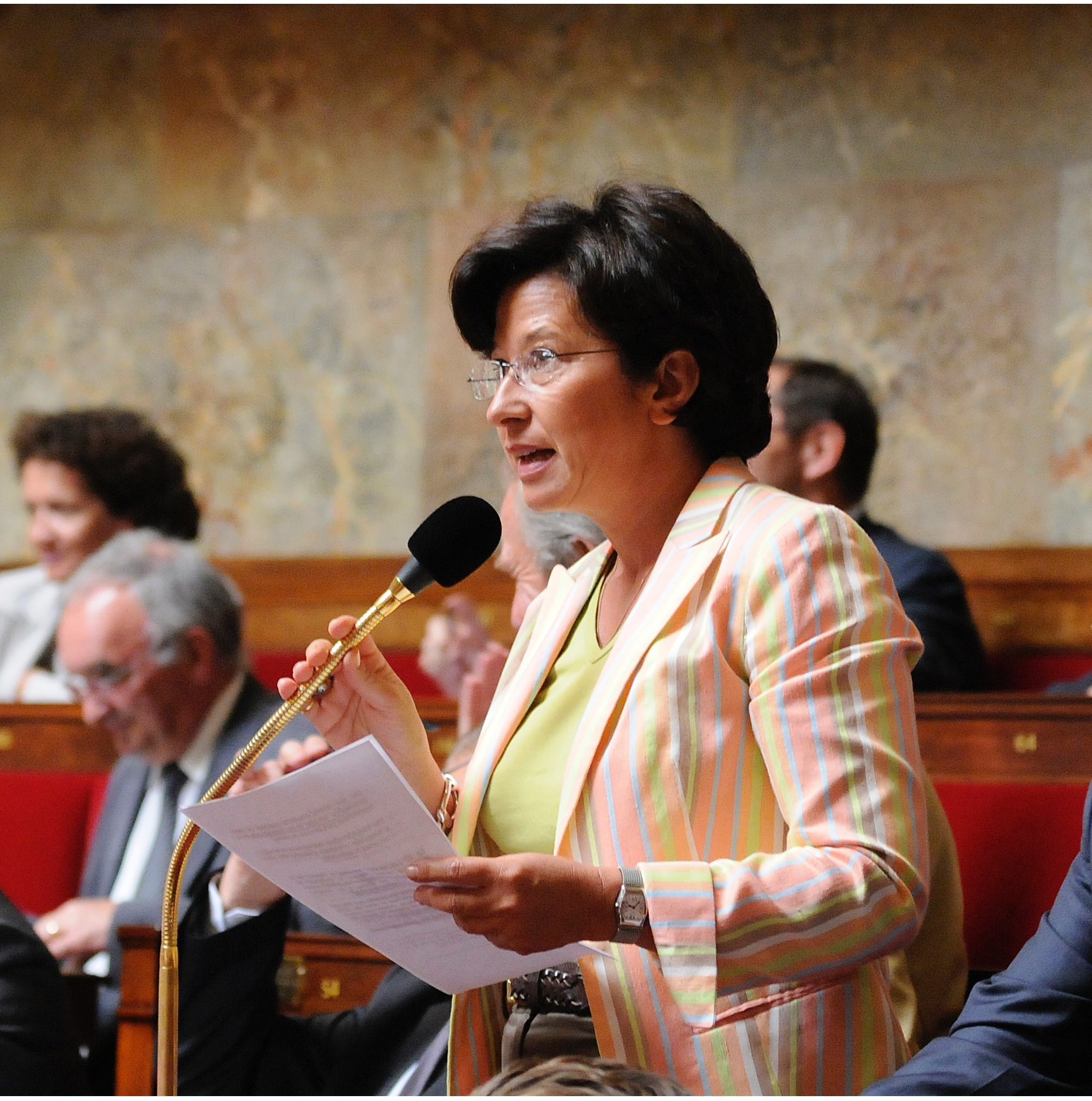

Member of the National Assembly for Vendée's 4th constituency
- Incumbent
- Assumed office 22 June 2022
- Preceded by: Martine Leguille-Balloy

Mayor of Les Herbiers
- In office 28 March 2014 – 30 June 2022
- Preceded by: Marcel Albert
- Succeeded by: Christophe Hogard

Member of the National Assembly for Vendée's 4th constituency
- In office 24 January 2005 – 20 June 2017

Mayor of Mouchamps
- In office 18 June 1995 – 18 March 2001
- Preceded by: Bernard Vachon
- Succeeded by: Hervé Robineau

Personal details
- Born: Véronique Marie-Jeanne Besse; 11 August 1963 (age 63) La Roche-sur-Yon, Vendée, France
- Party: Movement for France (until 2018)

Véronique Besse (French pronunciation: [veʁɔnik bɛs]; born 11 August 1963) is a member of the National Assembly of France and represents Vendée's 4th constituency. She is the current mayor of Les Herbiers, after being elected for the first time in 2014 with 57,76% of votes. She has been reelected at her position for a second time in 2020 with 67,18% of votes. Besse is a member of the Movement for France and does not align herself with any parliamentary group.
