= Saint-Pierre-le-Vieux, Vendée =

Saint-Pierre-le-Vieux
- Commune
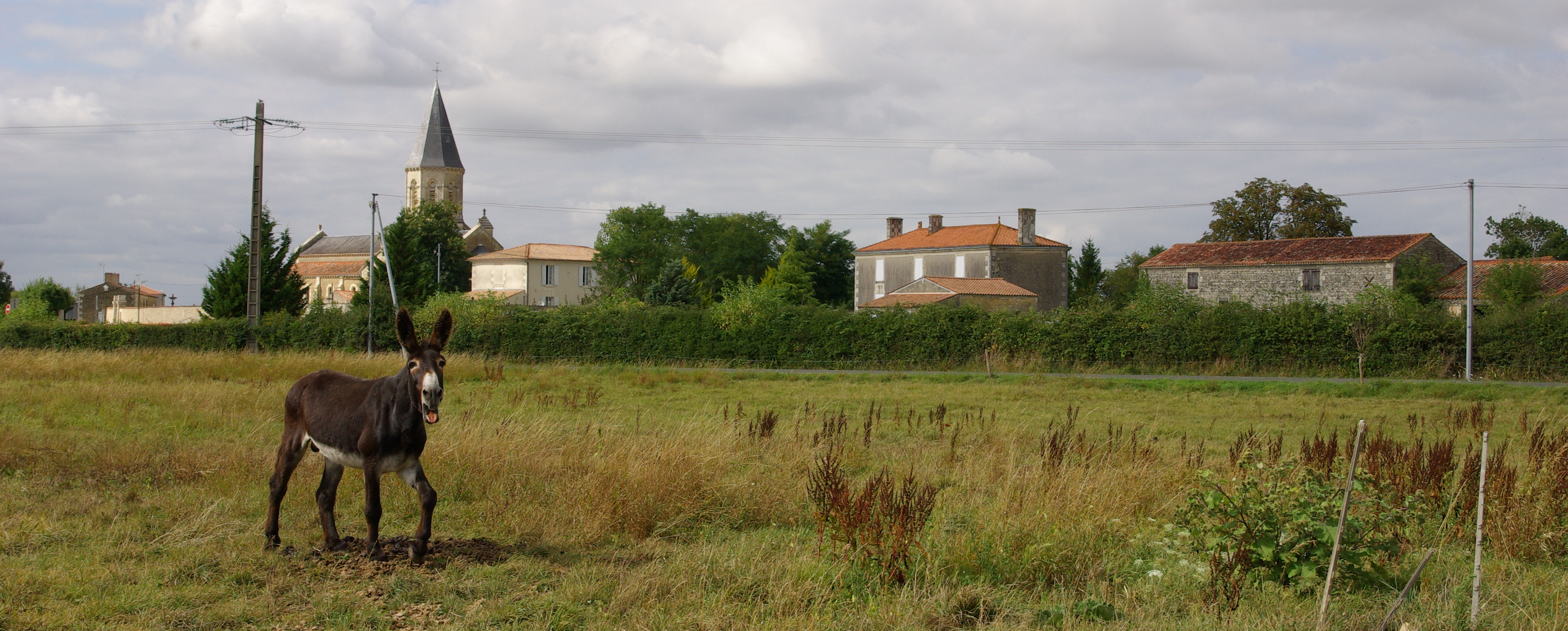
- A general view of Saint-Pierre-le-Vieux

- Coat of arms
- Location of Saint-Pierre-le-Vieux
- Location within France Location within Pays de la Loire
- Coordinates: 46°23′14″N 0°44′54″W
- Country: France
- Region: Pays de la Loire
- Department: Vendée
- Arrondissement: Fontenay-le-Comte
- Canton: Fontenay-le-Comte
- Intercommunality: Vendée Sèvre Autise

Government
  - Mayor (2020–2026): Christian Henriet
- Area^{1}: 23.19 km^{2} (8.95 sq mi)
- Highest elevation: 25 m (82 ft)
- Lowest elevation: 0 m (0 ft)
- Population (2023): 917
  - Density: 39.5/km^{2} (102/sq mi)
- Time zone: UTC+01:00 (CET)
  - Summer (DST): UTC+02:00 (CEST)
- INSEE/Postal code: 85265 /85420
- ^{1} French Land Register data, which excludes lakes, ponds, glaciers > 1 km^{2} (0.386 sq mi or 247 acres) and river estuaries.

Saint-Pierre-le-Vieux (French pronunciation: [sɛ̃ pjɛʁ lə vjø]) is a commune in the Vendée department in the Pays de la Loire region in western France.

== See also ==
- Communes of the Vendée department
