= Charente-Maritime =

Department of France

- Department of France
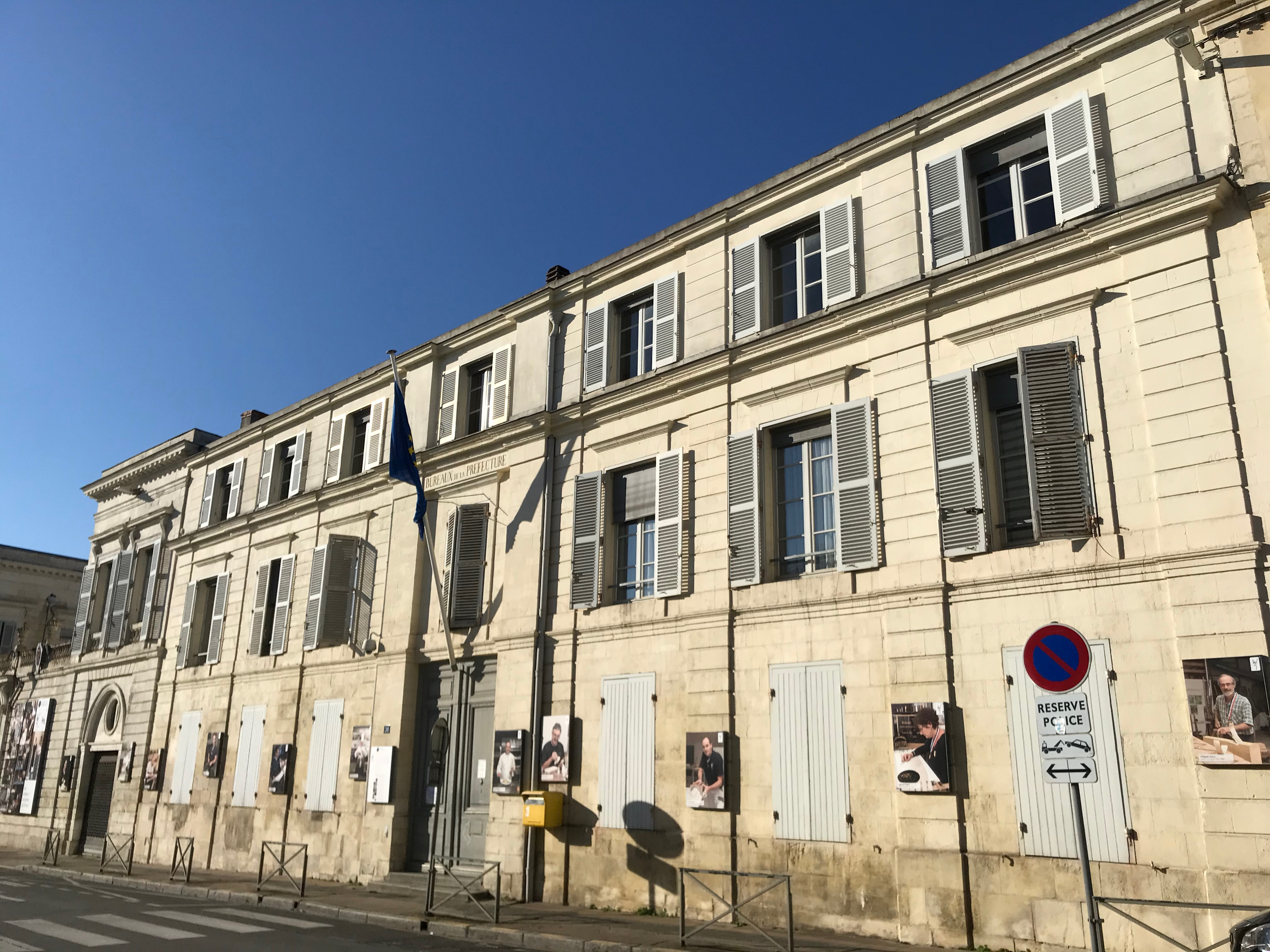
- Prefecture building in La Rochelle

- Flag Coat of arms

- Location of Charente-Maritime in France
- Coordinates: 45°57′N 0°58′W
- Country: France
- Region: Nouvelle-Aquitaine
- Prefecture: La Rochelle
- Subprefectures: Jonzac; Rochefort; Saintes; Saint-Jean-d'Angély

Government
  - President of the Departmental Council: Sylvie Marcilly (DVD)

Area^{1}
  - Total: 6,864 km^{2} (2,650 sq mi)

Population (2023)
  - Total: 672,279
  - Rank: 40th
  - Density: 97.94/km^{2} (253.7/sq mi)
- Time zone: UTC+1 (CET)
  - Summer (DST): UTC+2 (CEST)
- Area code: FR-17
- Department number: 17
- Arrondissements: 5
- Cantons: 27
- Communes: 462
- ^1 French Land Register data, which exclude estuaries and lakes, ponds and glaciers larger than 1 km^{2}

Charente-Maritime (French pronunciation: [ʃaʁɑ̃t maʁitim]; Poitevin-Saintongeais: Chérente-Marine; Occitan: Charanta Maritima) is a department in the French region of Nouvelle-Aquitaine, on the country's west coast. Named after the river Charente, its prefecture is La Rochelle. As of 2023, it had a population of 672,279, with an area of 6,864 square kilometres (2,650 sq mi).

== History ==
Charente-Maritime and the former provinces composing it, mostly Saintonge and Aunis

The history of the department begins with a decree from the Constituent Assembly on 22 December 1789, which took effect on 4 March 1790, creating it as one of the 83 original departments during the French Revolution. Named "Charente-Inférieure" after the lower course of the Charente, it was renamed Charente-Maritime on 4 September 1941, during World War II, reflecting its Atlantic coast identity. The department encompasses most of the former province of Saintonge (excluding Cognaçais and Barbezilien, part of Charente, and the duchy-pairie of Frontenay-Rohan-Rohan, in Deux-Sèvres), nearly all of Aunis, and the Pays d'Aulnay from Poitou.

Evidence of human settlement dates back to the Paleolithic era, with the Celtic Santon tribe settling during the La Tène period, fostering trade and crafts. Romanization after the Gallic War led to the rise of Mediolanum Santonum (Saintes), the capital of Augustan Aquitaine. Initially designated the prefecture in 1790 (having been Saintonge’s capital), Saintes lost this status in 1810 when Napoleon decreed its transfer to La Rochelle. The region, under Merovingian and Carolingian rule, oscillated between kingdom and duchy status until Carolingian decline spurred instability, shaping Aunis’ distinct identity.

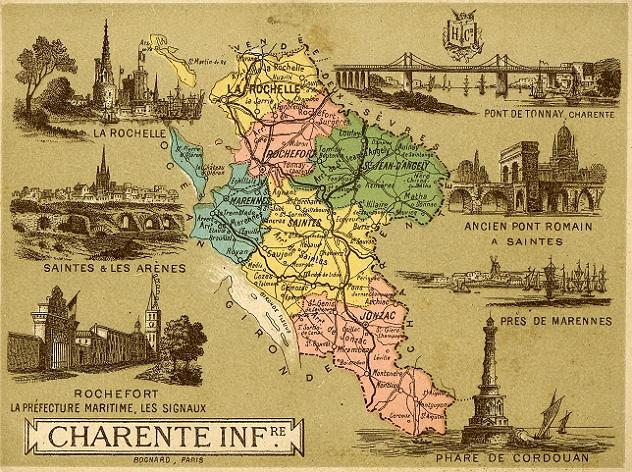
Map of 'Charente-Inférieure' in the 19th century

In the 12th century, Eleanor of Aquitaine’s remarriage tied the region to the Plantagenet domain, boosting trade with England despite revolts. The Hundred Years' War brought devastation, ending with the French recapture of Montguyon in 1451. The 16th century saw the Reformation and Wars of Religion divide Aunis and Saintonge. The French Revolution raised hopes but faltered with events like the Rochefort pontoons, amid tensions between the Vendée and Girondine uprisings. The 19th century brought prosperity under the Second Empire, driven by cognac, until the phylloxera crisis struck.

During World War II, the German Army occupied the department, integrating it into occupied France. The Organisation Todt built sea defences, including pillboxes along the presqu'île d'Arvert and Oléron island, to counter Allied landings. The war’s end saw German resistance pockets at La Rochelle and Royan; Royan was nearly destroyed by an RAF raid on 5 January 1945, and liberated by the French Forces of the Interior in April, while La Rochelle was freed on 9 May 1945.

=== Prehistory ===
==== Paleolithic ====
Human occupation in present-day Charente-Maritime dates to the Lower Paleolithic (Acheulean), evidenced by bifaces found near Gémozac and Pons along the Seugne and Soute rivers, and an Acheulean lithic industry at Les Thibauderies near Saint-Genis-de-Saintonge. The Middle Paleolithic saw Mousterian civilizations flourish, with artifacts unearthed in the Charente valley (e.g., Gros-Roc cave at Douhet and sites at Port-d'Envaux and Saint-Sever-de-Saintonge). In 1979, a Neanderthal skeleton found at Roche à Pierrot in Saint-Césaire (dated to ~36,300 years ago) confirmed overlap with Cro-Magnons, leading to the Paléosite center’s opening in 2005. Notable Aurignacian and Magdalenian finds include three engraved stones from Saint-Porchaire’s caves, the oldest (1924) depicting mammoths. Solutrean flint points were also discovered at Saint-Germain-du-Seudre and Bois.

==== Neolithic Revolution ====
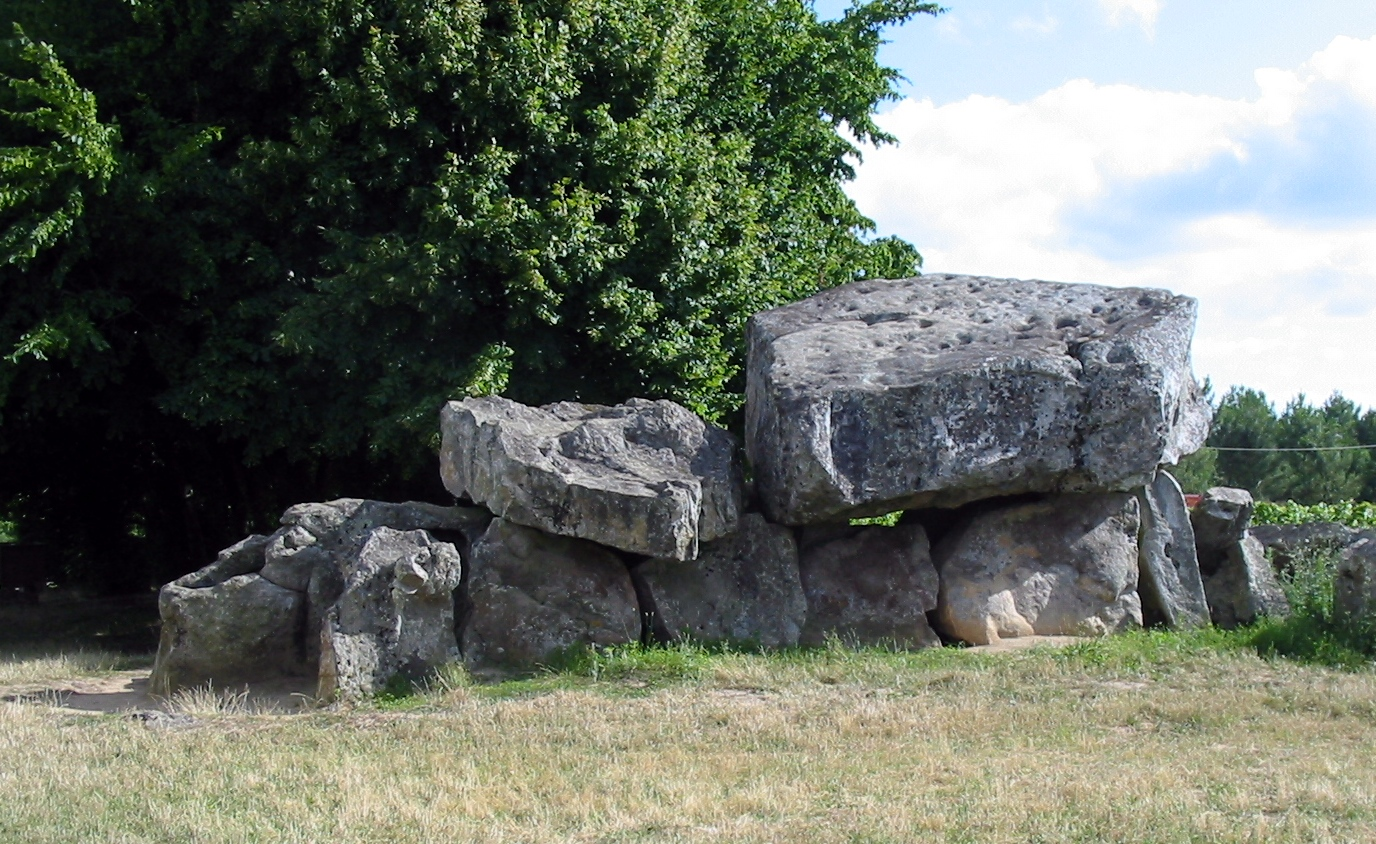
The covered alley of Pierre-Folle, in Montguyon.

The Neolithic "revolution" arrived in the Charente region around the 6th millennium BC, marked by settled agriculture, animal husbandry, and crafts like ceramics. The Middle Neolithic introduced the Chassean culture and megalithic monuments, including dolmens and menhirs, such as the Pierre-Levée dolmen at La Vallée, Pierre-Folle alley at Montguyon, and the largest menhir at Chives (Viviers-Jusseau). In the 4th–3rd millennia BC, the Matignons (e.g., Ile d'Oléron, Soubise) and Peu-Richard (Thénac, Barzan) civilizations built fortified camps. By the early 3rd millennium BC, the Artenac civilization emerged, introducing copper metallurgy.

=== Antiquity ===
==== The Santoni ====
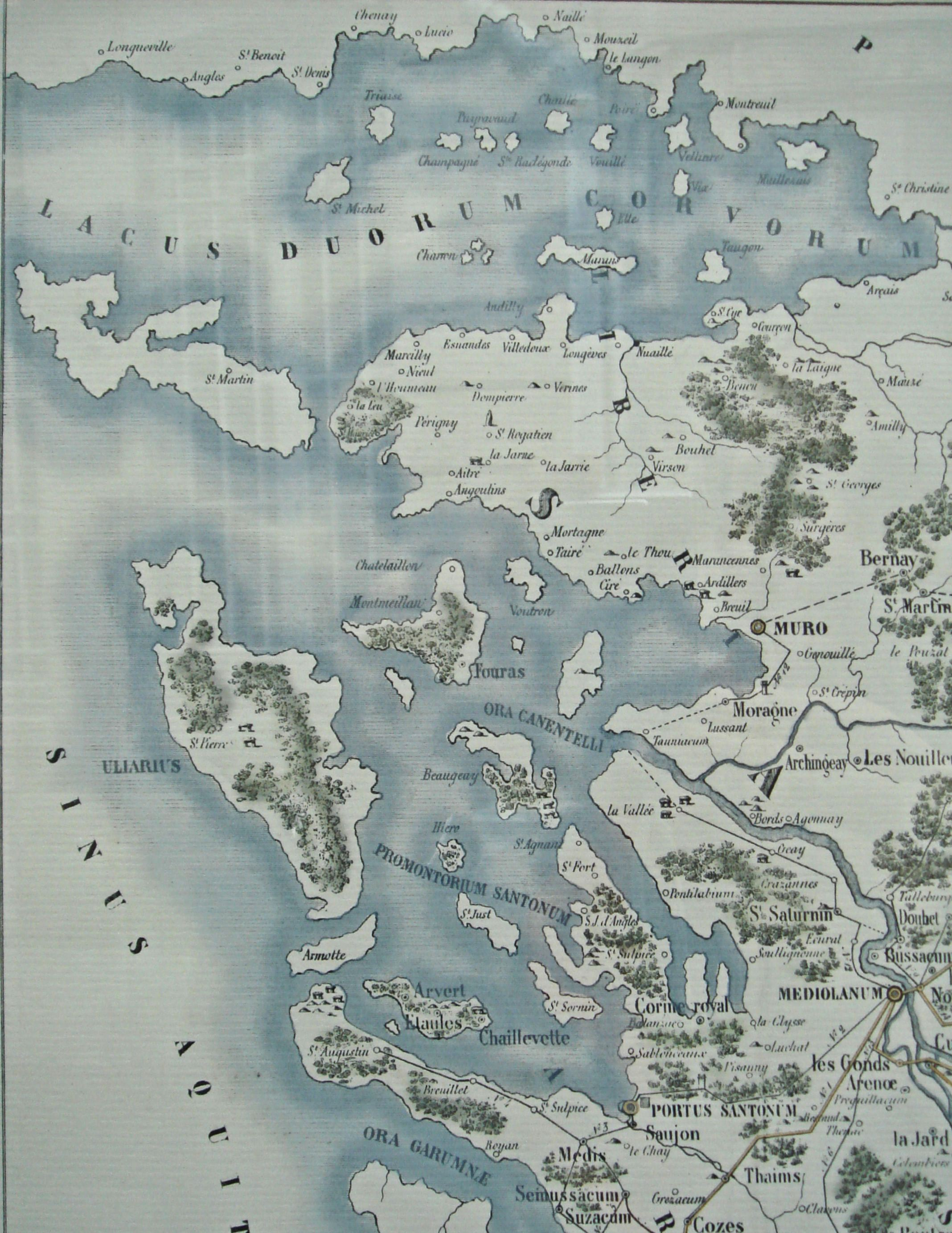
Probable geography of the Santon country during Roman domination.

From the Bronze Age, Saintonge inhabitants maintained trade with the Atlantic arc, evidenced by bronze objects in the Meschers deposit. In the early Iron Age, a tomb at Courcoury with Mediterranean imports (Etruscan basin, Greek bowl) highlights broader connections. During the La Tène period, the Santoni established the Pons oppidum as their political and trading hub, a key example of oppida civilization. This rural, hierarchical society featured self-sufficient villages and necropolises. Along the coast, they produced sea salt, while at Novioregum (Barzan), an emporium facilitated trade with the Romans via the Gironde estuary.

==== High Roman Empire and Gallo-Roman Period ====
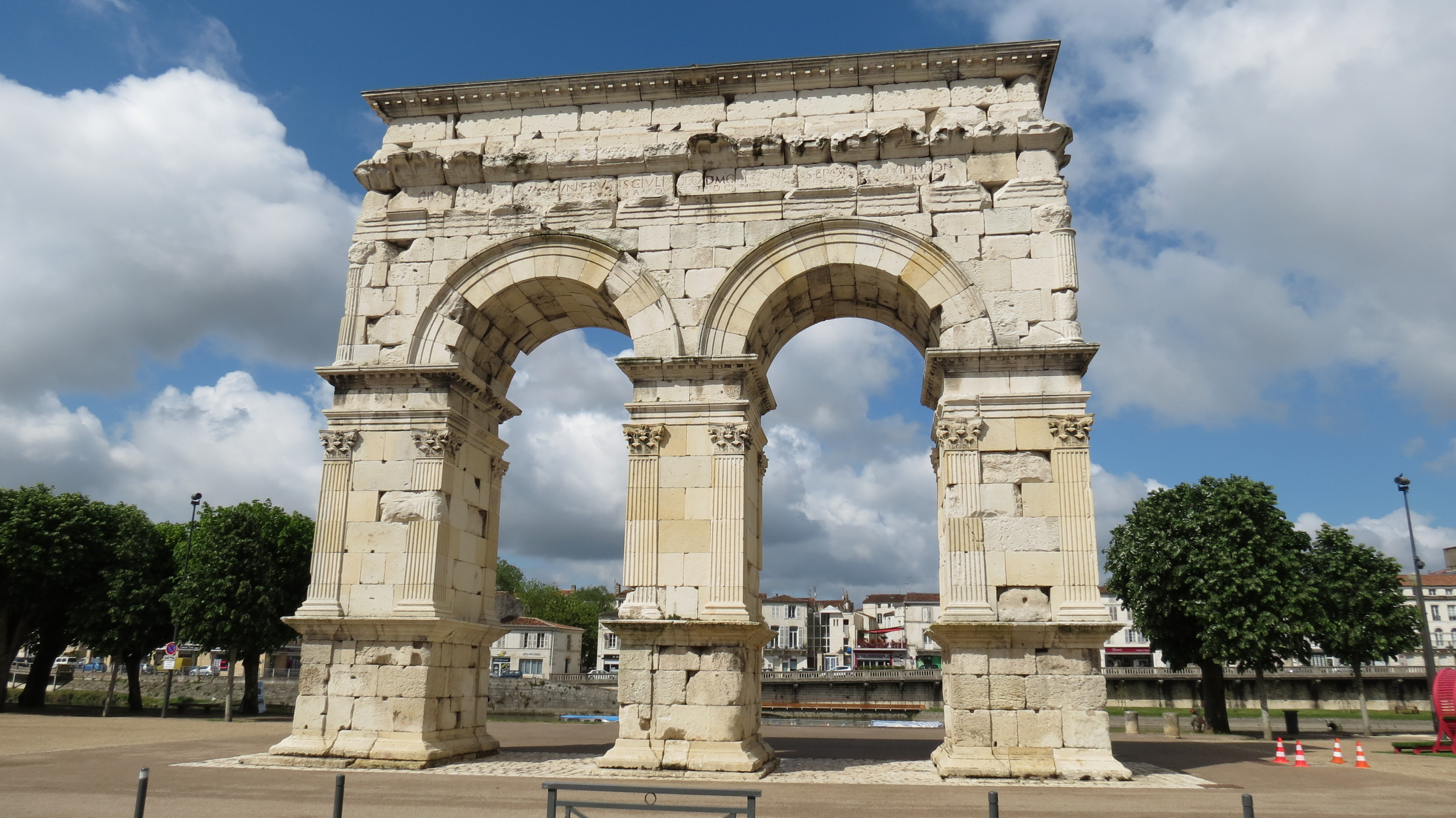
The arch of Germanicus at Saintes.

The Gallic War (58–51 BC), sparked by Julius Caesar’s intervention against the Helvetians, saw mixed Santon involvement: their fleet aided the Romans against the Venetians (56 BC), yet some joined Vercingetorix at Gergovia and Alesia. Post-conquest, under Augustus, the Santons’ territory became part of the province of Aquitaine, with Mediolanum Santonum (Saintes) as its first capital, boasting monuments like the votive arch and amphitheater. Novioregum (Barzan) emerged as a major port, exporting goods like wine (reallowed by Probus in 276) and santonine absinthe. Roman infrastructure, including roads to Burdigala (Bordeaux) and Limonum (Poitiers), and structures like the Pirelonge tower at Saint-Romain-de-Benet, enriched the region.

==== Late Roman Empire and First Barbarian Invasions ====
From the late 3rd century, barbarian invasions disrupted Santonia: Novioregum was destroyed in 256, and Mediolanum Santonum and Pons were burned in 276 by the Alamanni. Saintes retreated behind ramparts, shrinking significantly. In 285, Diocletian reorganized it into Aquitaine Seconde, diminishing Saintes’ role. Christianity emerged, led by Eutrope, the first bishop, though its spread was slow until the 5th century. After the Western Roman Empire’s fall in 476, Vandals and Alans plundered the region, ending its Gallo-Roman prosperity.

=== Early modern period ===
==== Early Middle Ages ====
Map of the first kingdom of Aquitaine (584-585).

In 418, a fœdus between Visigoth king Wallia and Roman emperor Flavius Honorius allowed Visigoths to settle in Aquitaine II, including Saintonge, forming the Visigothic kingdom with Toulouse as its capital. They occupied the region until 507, leaving toponymic traces like Goutrolles and Aumagne. Frankish king Clovis ousted them after defeating Alaric at Vouillé. In 584, Gondovald briefly ruled a Merovingian kingdom of Aquitaine, supported by Bishop Palladius of Saintes. A second kingdom under Caribert II became a duchy after his death, with Eudes resisting Saracen incursions in 732, halted by Charles Martel near Poitiers. Charlemagne established a new kingdom of Aquitaine in 781 for his son Louis. Viking raids began in 843, devastating Royan, Saujon, Saintes (845, 863), and Saint-Jean-d’Angély (865), weakening Carolingian control and fostering feudalism. By the 10th century, Aunis split from Saintonge, with castles like Broue built for defense.

==== Late Middle Ages ====
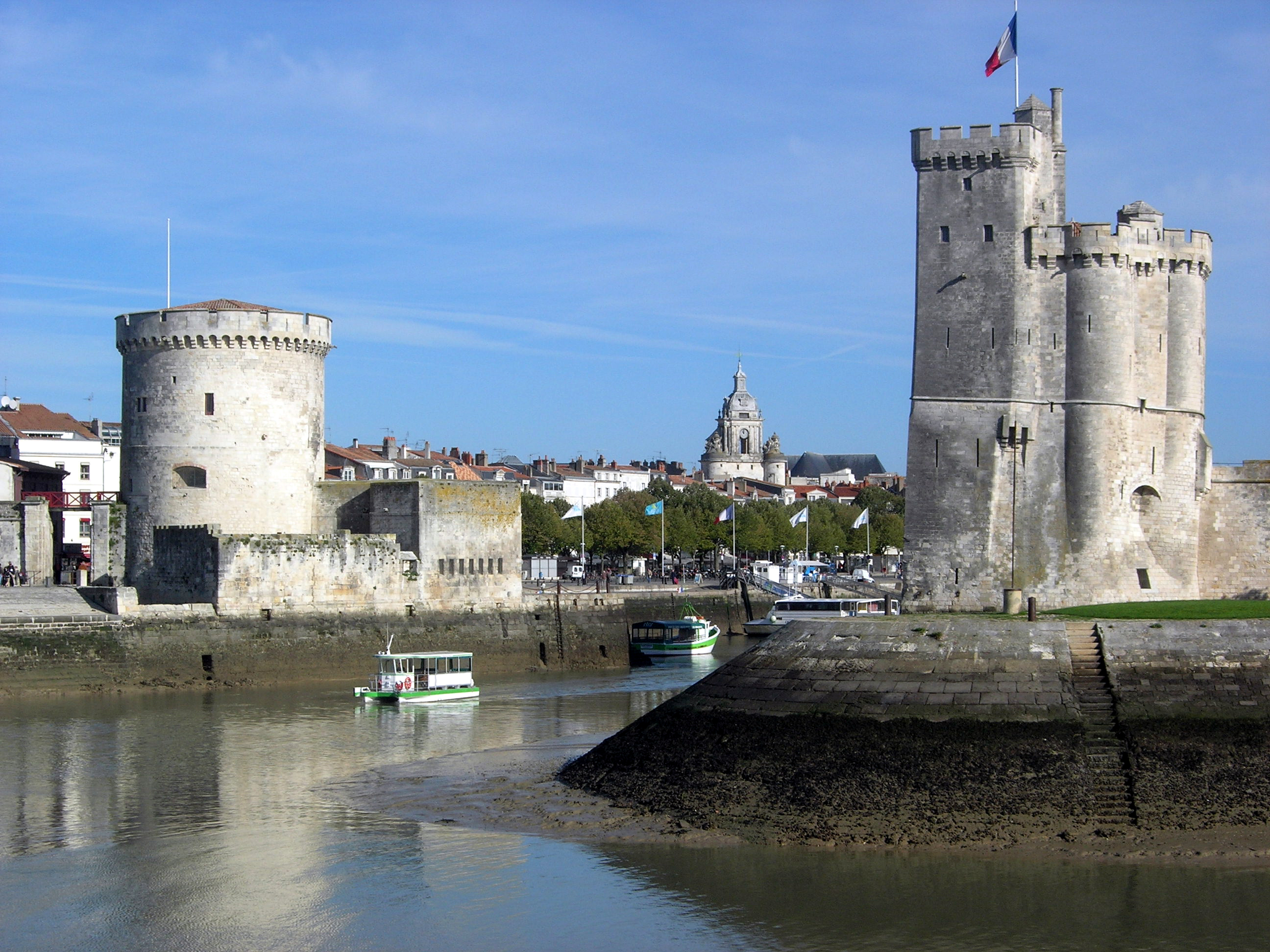
The Old Port of La Rochelle

La Rochelle grew in the 12th century under the Dukes of Aquitaine, gaining a communal charter from Henry II in 1175 and boosting trade with the Hanseatic League. Saintonge and Aunis prospered from salt, wine, and stone exports. The Via Turonensis pilgrimage route spurred religious growth, with a hospice in Pons and a basilica for Eutropius in Saintes. In 1137, Eleanor of Aquitaine inherited the region, marrying Louis VII, then Henry Plantagenet in 1152, tying Aquitaine to England. Her Roles of Oléron maritime code emerged in 1169. Rebellions in 1174 and sieges like Saintes strained Plantagenet rule. After John’s contested reign, Philippe Auguste seized most of Saintonge and Aunis by 1204, though La Rochelle resisted until 1224 under Louis VIII. The Battle of Taillebourg (1242) saw Louis IX defeat Henry III, solidified by the Treaty of Paris (1259).

==== Hundred Years' War ====
France in 1365. Territories controlled by Edward III Territories ceded by France to England under the Treaty of Brétigny Territory of the Duchy of Brittany, allied with the English

The Hundred Years' War began when Edward III claimed the French throne in 1337, sparking the "Saintonge Wars." In 1345, Henry of Lancaster raided Saintonge, capturing key towns. The Black Death (1347) paused fighting, but in 1351, John II retook Saint-Jean-d’Angély. The Treaty of Brétigny (1360) ceded Saintonge and Aunis to Edward of Woodstock, but Charles V’s forces, led by Du Guesclin, reversed this. The Battle of La Rochelle (1372) and subsequent sieges secured French control by 1374. After truces, Charles VII’s reconquest ended with the siege of Montguyon (1451) and the Battle of Castillon (1453), leaving the region devastated.

=== Early modern period ===
==== Renaissance ====
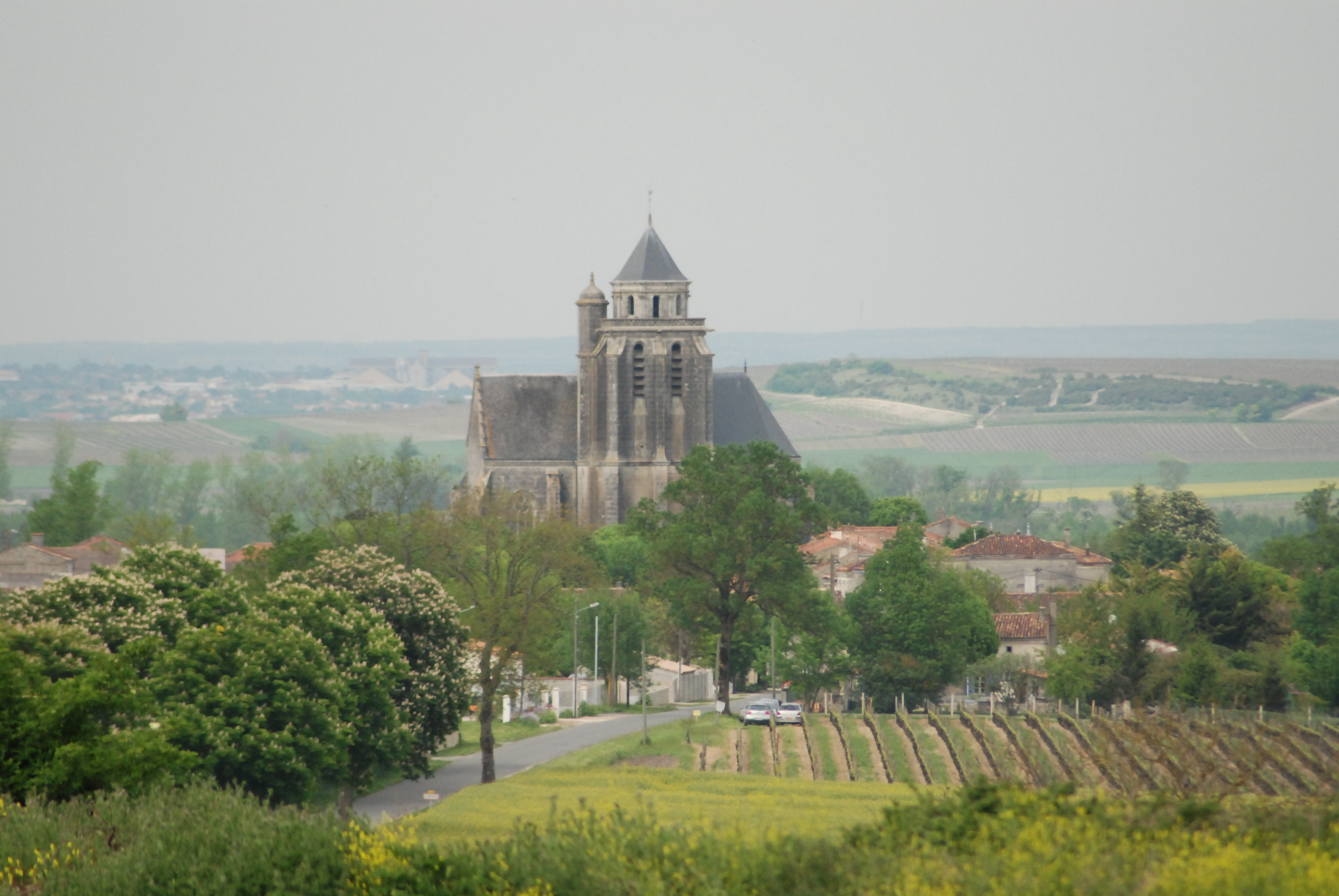
The church of Lonzac, a rare Renaissance architecture example in Saintonge.

Post-war recovery in Saintonge and Aunis was rapid, with lords granting land to peasants, spurring population growth and agricultural revival. Louis XI confirmed communal charters, and towns like Marennes (1452) and Jonzac (1473) gained fair rights. La Rochelle’s trade flourished, welcoming foreign ships despite plagues (1500–1515) and a 1518 hurricane. In 1542, François I’s attempt to impose the gabelle tax on salt sparked revolt, initially subdued by Gaspard de Saulx, but he granted amnesty after arriving in La Rochelle. The Jacquerie des Pitauds erupted in 1548, spreading regionally; rebels seized Pons, Saintes, and Royan, but Anne de Montmorency’s harsh repression crushed it, though Henri II later restored the old tax system in 1555. Cod fishing grew from ports like La Tremblade and Royan by 1546, and Jacopolis-sur-Brouage was founded in 1555 as a salt trade hub.

==== The Reformation ====
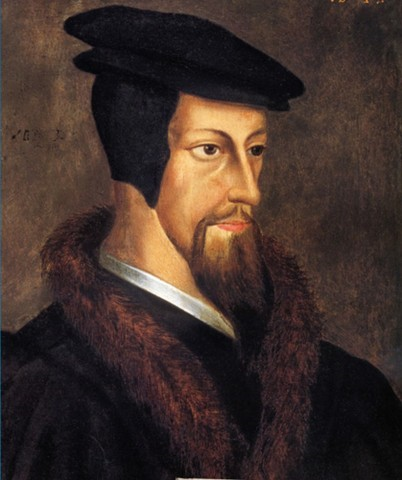
John Calvin.

The Reformation gained traction in Aunis and Saintonge after Martin Luther’s 1517 95 Theses, fueled by clerical abuses and trade with Protestant Northern Europe. John Calvin briefly preached in Saintonge in 1534 as Charles d’Espeville. Coastal areas like Marennes and Oléron became Reformed strongholds. Repression began in 1548, with public penance in La Rochelle and executions in 1552. Protestant churches emerged, including La Rochelle (1557) and Saint-Jean-d’Angély (1558), though leaders like Philibert Hamelin faced execution. Tensions escalated with the 1562 Massacre of Vassy, igniting the Wars of Religion.

==== Wars of Religion ====
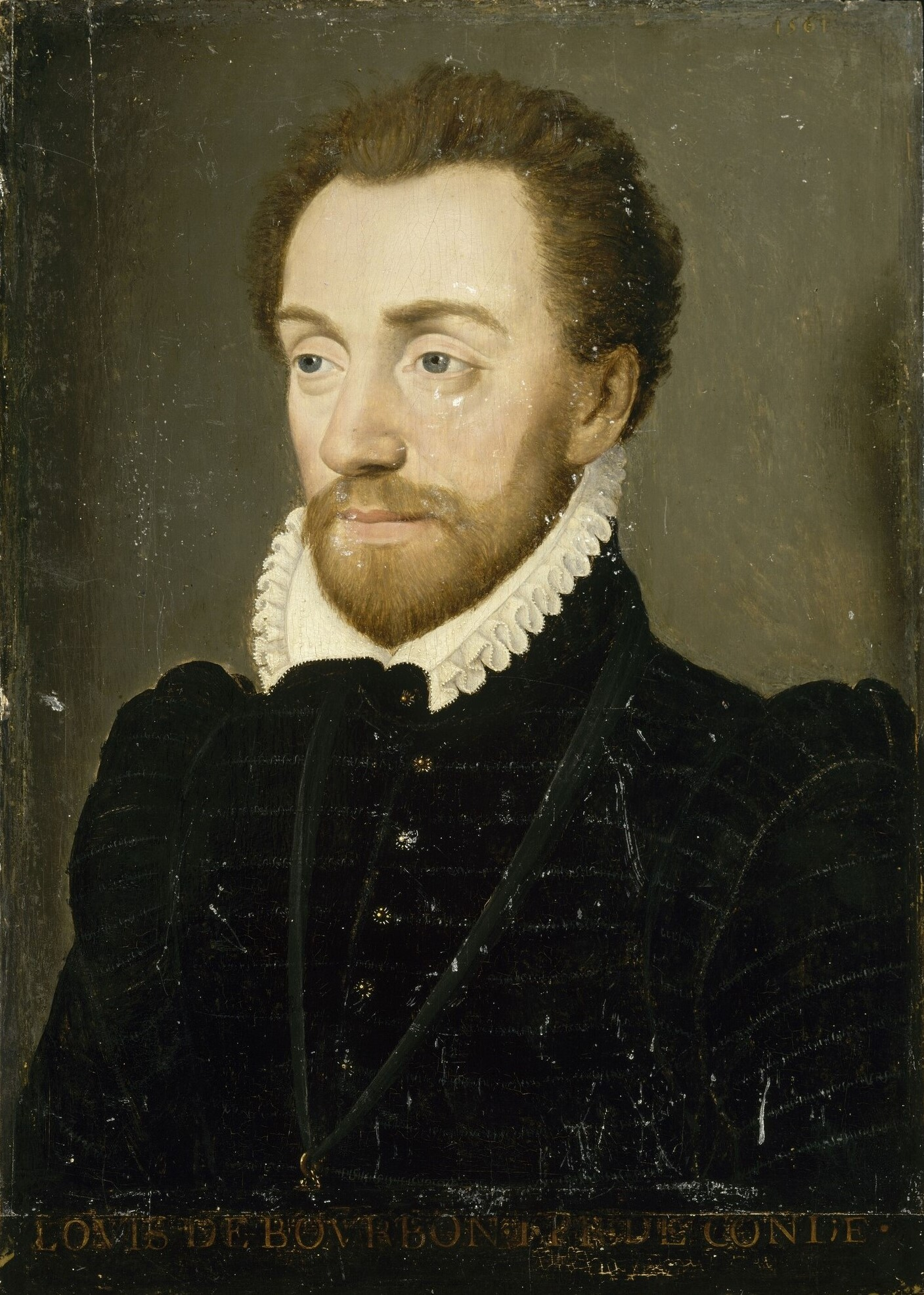
Louis I of Bourbon-Condé, Protestant leader.

La Rochelle’s growing Calvinist population led to the 1562 Edict of Toleration by Charles IX, but the Massacre of Vassy sparked uprisings led by Louis de Condé. Iconoclastic attacks hit Saint-Jean-d’Angély’s abbey in 1562. The Edict of Amboise (1563) ended the first war. In 1565, Charles IX visited Saintes and La Rochelle, noting Protestant resistance. By 1567, La Rochelle became a Protestant stronghold under mayor François Pontard, aligning with Condé. The Battle of Jarnac (1569) killed Condé, but the Edict of Saint-Germain (1570) made La Rochelle a Protestant safe haven. The St. Bartholomew’s Day massacre (1572) led to the Siege of La Rochelle, which ended in 1573. Later wars saw Henri de Navarre lead Protestants, culminating in the Edict of Nantes (1598), designating La Rochelle and others as security strongholds.

=== 17th century ===
==== From the Edict of Nantes to the Assassination of Henri IV ====
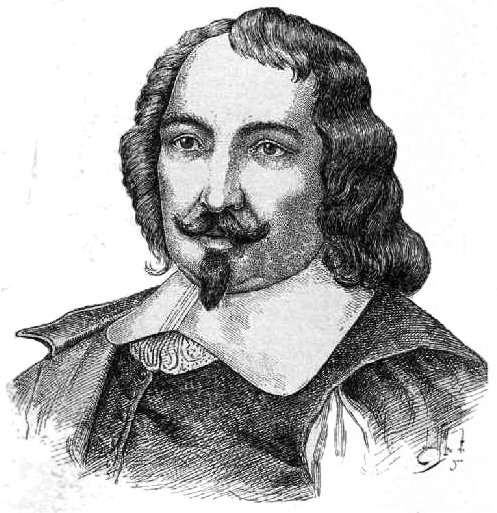
A fake portrait of Samuel de Champlain, founder of Quebec.

Under Henri IV, the Edict of Nantes (1598) brought civil peace, though tensions persisted between Catholics and Protestants. Tax increases, like the 1602 "pancarte" extension, sparked revolts in Aunis and Saintonge, with La Rochelle’s privileges causing regional envy. Henri IV ordered land reclamation in Marans’ marshes, led by Flemish and Brabantine experts. Explorers Pierre Dugua de Mons and Samuel de Champlain from Saintonge founded Québec in 1608, boosting New France migration. Henri IV’s assassination in 1610 raised Protestant fears under regent Marie de Médicis, who favored Catholics, prompting leaders like Henri II de Rohan to emerge.

==== Aunis and Saintonge Under the Reign of Louis XIII ====
Charente-Maritime’s pre-1790 provinces: Aunis, Saintonge, Poitou, and Angoumois.

From 1615–1620, Aunis and Saintonge saw skirmishes due to Louis XIII’s pro-Spanish policies and Catholic restoration in Navarre, inciting Protestant unrest. In 1621, Louis XIII besieged Saint-Jean-d’Angély, defended by Benjamin de Soubise, capturing it after a month, abolishing privileges, and razing defenses. Pons surrendered, but Royan’s 1622 siege ended with its destruction. La Rochelle resisted longer, facing a year-long blockade.

==== Siege of La Rochelle (1627-1628) ====
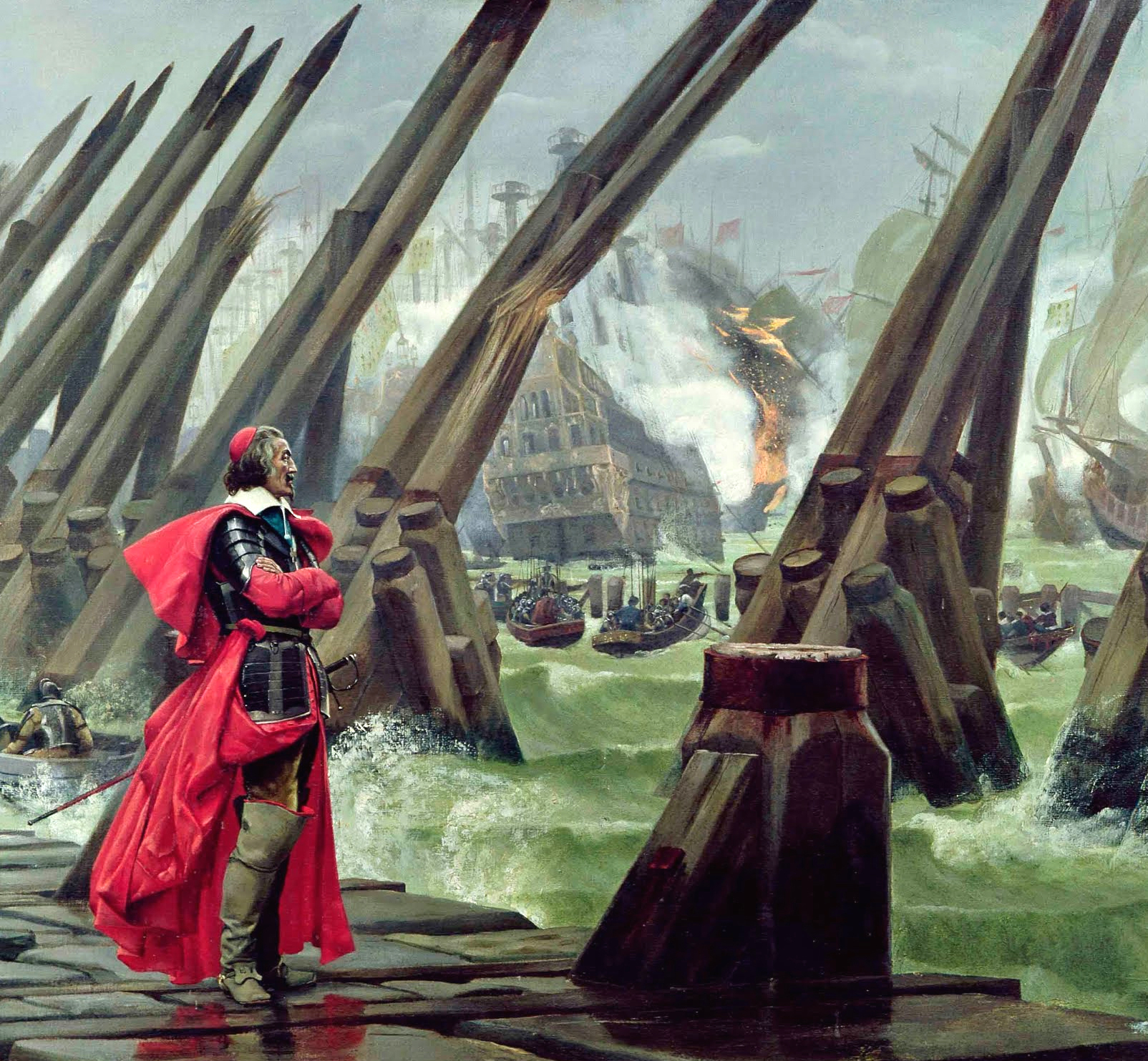
The Siege of La Rochelle by Cardinal Richelieu, painted by Henri-Paul Motte.

La Rochelle, dubbed the "metropolis of heresy" by Cardinal Richelieu, defied Louis XIII, leading to the 1622 Treaty of Montpellier, which faltered over Fort-Louis’ demolition. Renewed conflict in 1625 saw Jean Guiton’s fleet lose to Henri II de Montmorency, and Saint-Martin-de-Ré fell. In 1627, England’s Duke of Buckingham blockaded Île de Ré, while Richelieu’s siege of La Rochelle, with a dike blocking sea access, began. Famine and disease reduced the population from 28,000 to 5,000, forcing surrender on 28 October 1628.

==== The Peace of Alès and the Counter-Reformation ====
The Peace of Alès (1629) stripped Protestants of safe havens but allowed worship, though the Counter-Reformation pushed Catholic resurgence with Jesuit colleges and church restorations. In 1648, the diocese of La Rochelle was created, converting its grand temple into a cathedral. By 1660, 80,000 Protestants remained in Saintonge and Aunis.

==== The Reign of Louis XIV and the 1685 Revocation of the Edict of Nantes ====
Louis XIV intensified Protestant persecution with dragonnades, taxes, and temple destruction, culminating in the 1685 Edict of Fontainebleau, revoking the Edict of Nantes. Clandestine "desert church" gatherings persisted, and many Protestants emigrated from Marennes and Arvert to England, Holland, and North America.

==== 1666: Creation of Rochefort ====
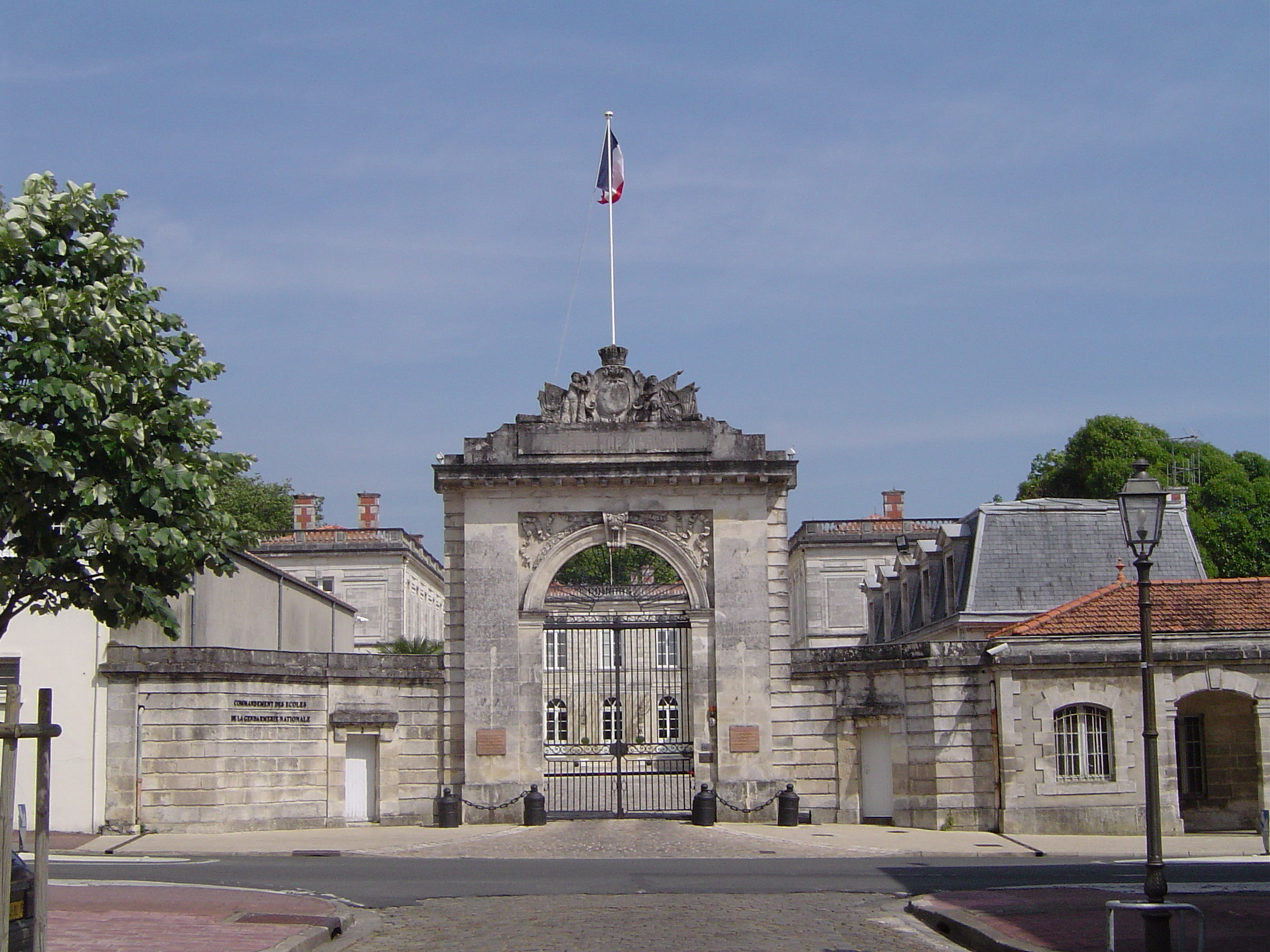
The King’s house in Rochefort.

In 1666, Jean-Baptiste Colbert established Rochefort as a naval arsenal on the Charente, designed on a grid plan with key facilities like the Corderie Royale. Fortifications by Vauban bolstered coastal defenses. Michel Bégon, Intendant from 1688, modernized it with social and cultural initiatives.

==== 1694: Creation of the Généralité de La Rochelle ====
In 1694, Michel Bégon became Intendant of the new Généralité de La Rochelle, unifying five elections from Poitiers, Limoges, and Bordeaux jurisdictions.

=== 18th century ===
==== Return to Prosperity in the Age of Enlightenment ====
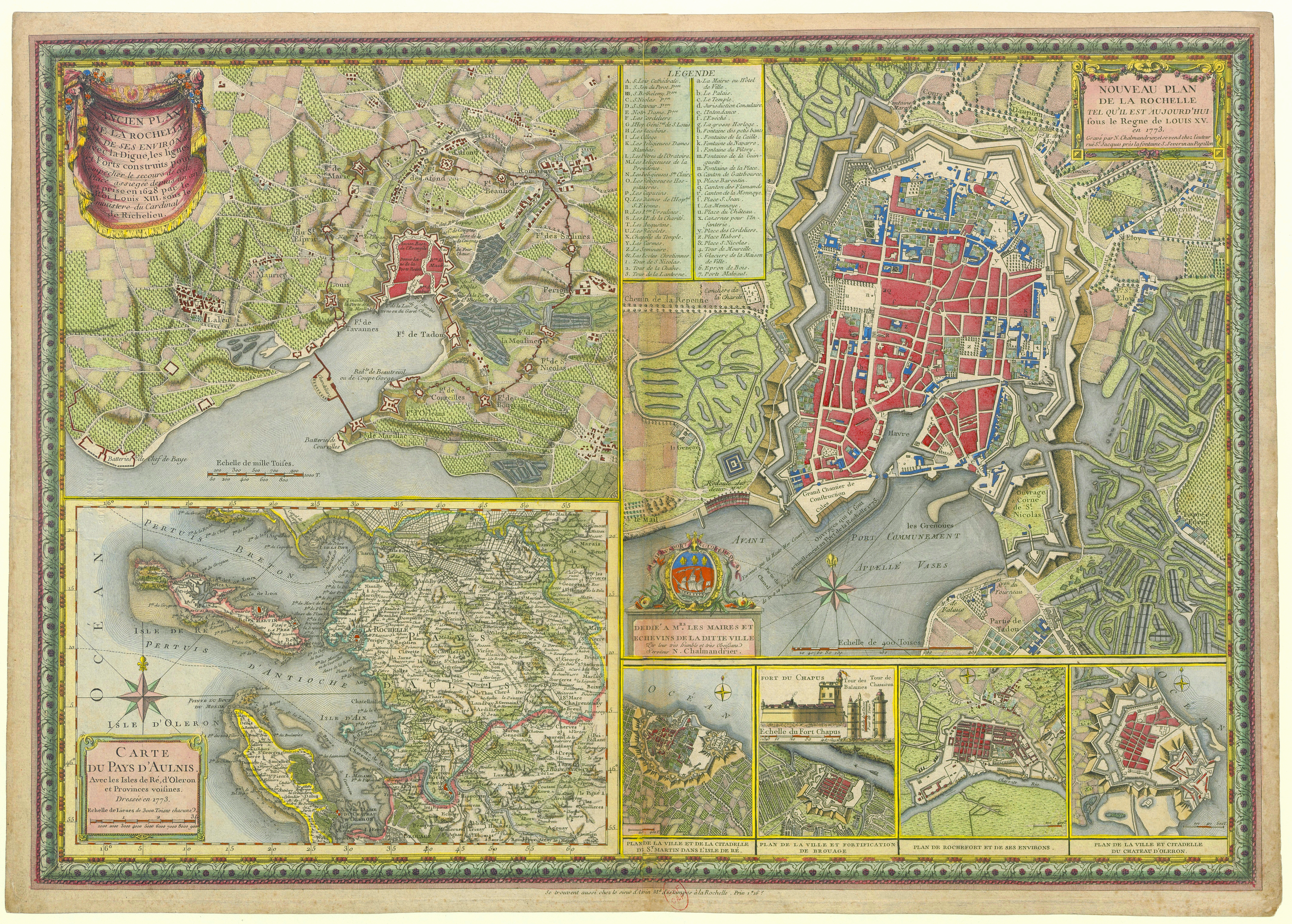
La Rochelle and Aunis in 1773.

The 18th century brought agricultural growth in Aunis and Saintonge with the introduction of corn from the New World, complementing wheat, rye, and barley. Cognac production began, with eau-de-vie shipped via La Rochelle to Northern Europe. The "Little Ice Age" caused harsh winters, notably in 1708, 1739, and 1788/1789, freezing rivers and triggering famines. Textile and leather industries thrived in Saintes and Jonzac. La Rochelle prospered through the triangular trade, importing sugar and engaging in the slave trade, while Rochefort trained soldiers for New France. Enlightenment advances included La Rochelle’s Académie (1732) and Rochefort’s Naval Medicine School (1722). During the Seven Years' War, British raids in 1757 failed to take Rochefort. In 1780, Marquis de La Fayette sailed from Rochefort on L'Hermione to aid the American Revolution. (Note: A replica of this ship is being built in Rochefort.) Economic decline in the 1780s, worsened by the 1788/1789 winter, led to riots in Rochefort by 1789. The Estates-General convened in 1789, with representatives from La Rochelle, Saintes, and Saint-Jean-d’Angély drafting reform-focused cahiers de doléances.

==== Revolution ====
Map of Charente-Inférieure (1790).

The Estates-General led to the Constituent Assembly, which, on 22 December 1789, created the department of Saintonge-et-Aunis, renamed Charente-Inférieure by 26 February 1790, centered on the Charente River. Ratified on 4 March 1790, it merged Aunis and Saintonge, incorporating some Poitevin areas, and was divided into seven districts, later six arrondissements, with Saintes chosen as the capital after debate. The new order was widely accepted, with a federative oath taken on 14 July 1790, though rural discontent over lingering feudal rights sparked unrest, including uprisings in Saint-Thomas-de-Conac and Varaize, where a mayor was killed. The Civil Constitution of the Clergy divided the clergy, with many, including Bishop Pierre-Louis de La Rochefoucauld of Saintes, refusing the oath; he was arrested in 1792 and killed in the September Massacres. From 1791–1793, Charente-Inférieure raised eight battalions for war against Austria and Prussia. The Republic was proclaimed on 22 September 1792.

==== The Terror ====
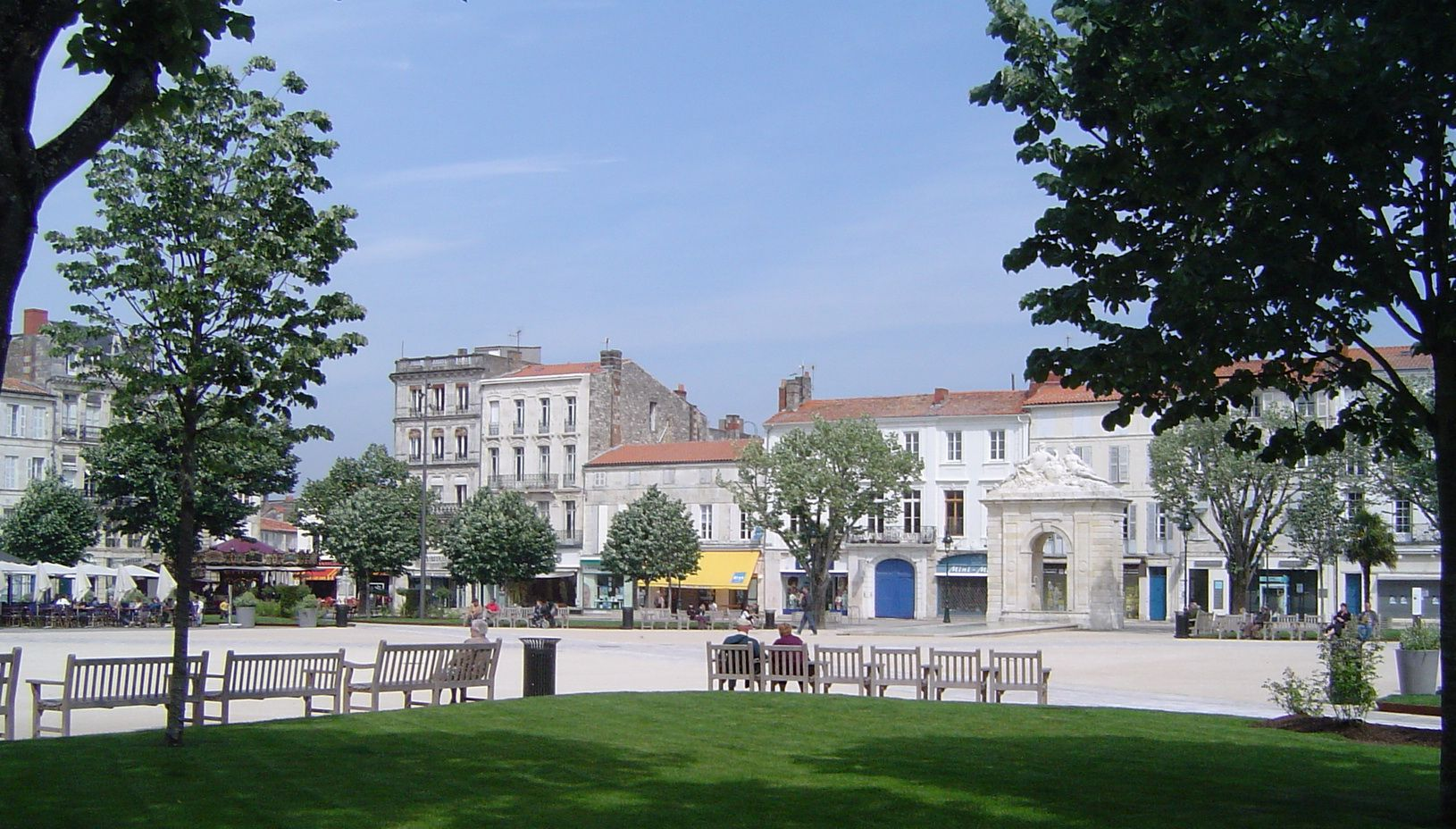
Place Colbert in Rochefort, site of the guillotine.

The Execution of Louis XVI on 21 January 1793, radicalized the Revolution under the Montagne faction, establishing the Comité de salut public and Tribunal révolutionnaire. Rochefort gained strategic importance as the Republic’s key arsenal after Toulon’s fall. The Rochefort Revolutionary Court, created 3 November 1793, by Joseph Lequinio and Joseph François Laignelot, became a tool of repression, with the guillotine set up at Place Colbert. A de-Christianization campaign targeted priests, forcing renunciations and transforming churches into "temples of Reason." On 25 January 1794, refractory priests were rounded up for deportation to French Guiana, but British blockades confined them to ships like the "Deux-Associés" off Île Madame, where typhus killed many. Survivors were released in 1795 or later under the 1802 Concordat. Rural brigandage, including "chauffeurs," surged amid administrative chaos.

=== Contemporary times ===
==== Charente-Inférieure During the First Empire ====
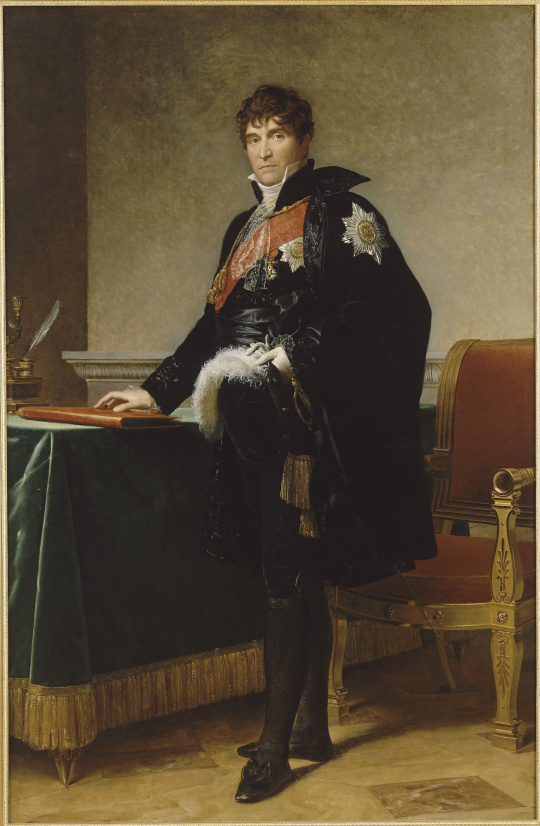
Michel Regnaud, imperial councilor and count.

After Napoleon’s coup, Charente-Inférieure overwhelmingly supported the Empire in 1804, with local leaders attending the coronation. Michel Regnaud rose as a key imperial figure. Napoleon visited in 1804, initiating Fort Boyard’s construction, halted by British threats. The 1809 Battle of Aix Island saw British forces under Thomas Cochrane destroy much of the French fleet. Napoleon reinforced coastal defenses with forts like Énet. In 1810, La Rochelle became the prefecture. After defeats in 1814, Napoleon was exiled from Île d’Aix to Saint Helena.

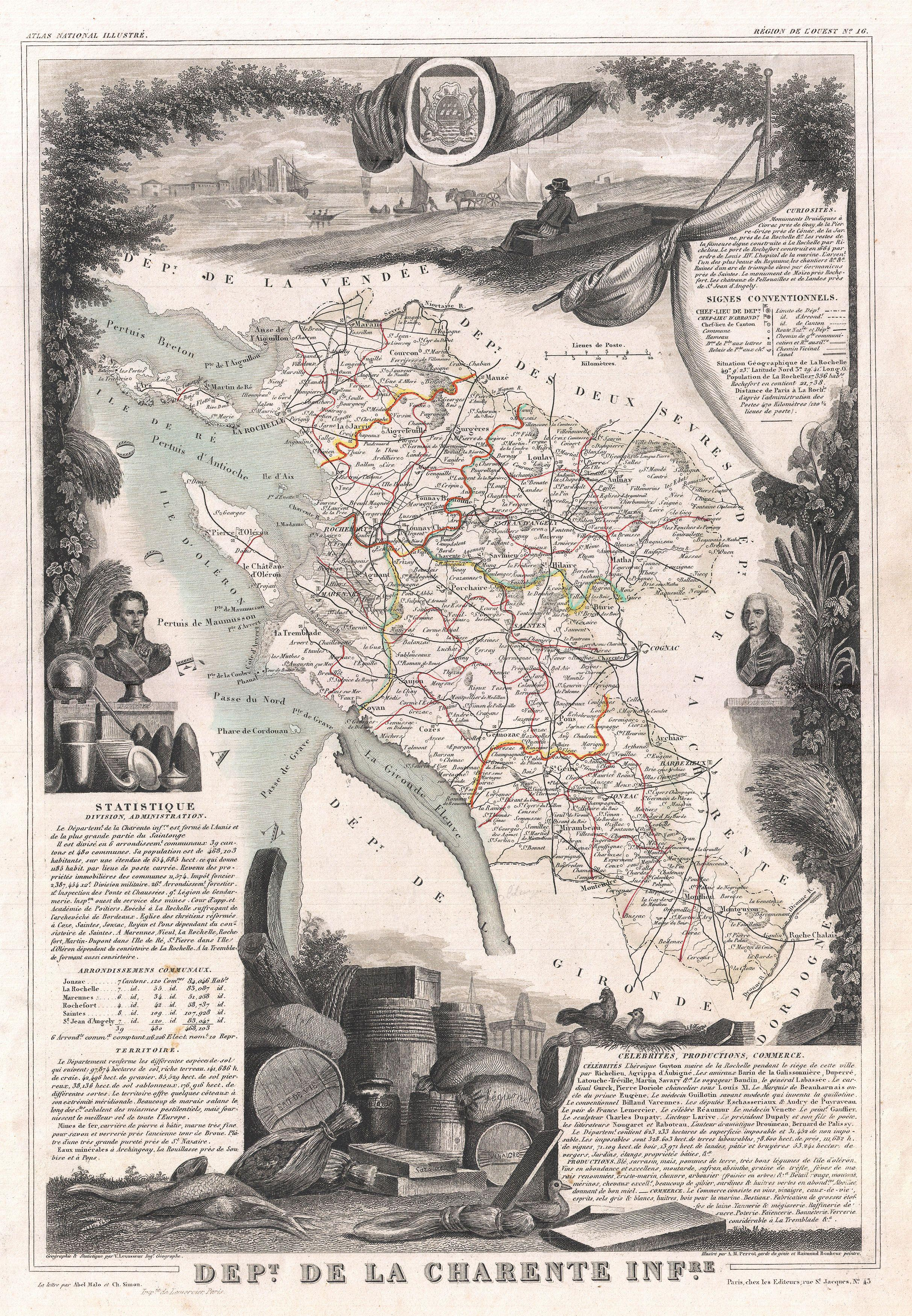
Charente-Inférieure in 1852.

==== Charente-Inférieure During the Restoration ====
The four sergeants before execution.

The Restoration saw indifference in Charente-Inférieure, though peace spurred rural growth. Marsh reclamation in Brouage began under sub-prefect Charles-Esprit Le Terme. Cultural societies emerged, and the 1833 Guizot law reduced illiteracy from 53.7% (1832) to 2.4% (1901). The 1822 four sergeants’ plot against Louis XVIII gained national attention.

==== Charente-Inférieure During the July Monarchy ====
The July Revolution and Louis-Philippe I’s reign brought economic crises, sparking 1839 riots in La Rochelle and Marans. Deputies Jules Dufaure and Tanneguy Duchâtel rose to ministerial roles.

==== Charente-Inférieure During the Second Republic ====
The 1848 revolution was welcomed, with Napoleon becoming President, and then Emperor after the 1851 coup.

==== Charente-Inférieure During the Second Empire ====
The Second Empire boosted agriculture and Cognac production, with vineyards growing from 111,000 hectares (1839) to 164,651 (1876), aided by an 1860 trade treaty. Railroads developed, starting with the Rochefort-La Rochelle-Poitiers line in 1857. Prosper de Chasseloup-Laubat became Minister of Marine in 1860.

==== Charente-Inférieure during the Third Republic (1870-1940) ====
===== The Slow Establishment of the Republican Idea =====
Charente-Inférieure remained Bonapartist post-1870, with Baron Eugène Eschassériaux leading conservatives until 1893. Republican gains came in 1876 with Jules Dufaure as President of the Council (1876-1879). Phylloxera devastated vineyards from 1872, dropping production from 7 million to 70,000 hectoliters by 1880; Saintonge rebuilt vineyards, while Aunis shifted to dairy, led by Eugène Biraud’s 1888 cooperative. Coastal resorts like Royan boomed with rail access by 1875, hosting figures like Émile Zola during the Belle Époque. In 1895, Alfred Dreyfus was held in Saint-Martin-de-Ré before deportation.

===== The Belle Époque: Radical Domination =====
Radicals dominated post-1898, with Émile Combes of Pons as President of the Council (1902-1905), pushing the 1905 Church-State separation law. In 1910, a rail crash at Saujon killed 38 and injured 80.

===== A Great War Is Seen from Afar =====
World War I mobilization began on 1 August 1914; Charente-Inférieure supported the war effort with converted factories and U.S. bases like Saint-Trojan-les-Bains (1917). The unfinished Talmont port project halted with the 1918 armistice.

===== Between the Wars =====
Post-war population dropped from 451,044 (1911) to 418,310 (1921), worsened by a 1920 oyster epizootic. The Rochefort arsenal closed in 1927, but La Pallice port expanded by 1930. The Great Depression hit in 1931, ending the Roaring Twenties. Radicals held strong in 1936 (42%), with strikes following the Front Populaire victory.

==== World War II ====
German occupation began 23 June 1940, after the armistice; Charente-Inférieure hosted Alsace-Lorraine refugees from 1939. The Atlantic Wall fortified the coast, and La Pallice gained a Kriegsmarine submarine base by 1941. Resistance faced harsh repression, with deportations to camps like Drancy. The name changed to Charente-Maritime in 1941. Liberation began in August 1944, with Royan bombed by the RAF in 1945 (442 civilian deaths) and freed in April via Operation Venerable. Oléron was liberated on 30 April, and La Rochelle surrendered on 9 May 1945.

==== Post-war ====
===== 1945-1960: The Feverish Years of Reconstruction =====
Royan, 85% destroyed, was rebuilt as a modernist "urban laboratory" under Claude Ferret in the 1950s. Saintes launched the "Castors Saintais" housing cooperative in 1950. Rail lines closed, replaced by roads like Rochefort-Aigrefeuille-d’Aunis by 1950.

===== 1960-1975: Modernization Underway =====
The Trente Glorieuses brought industrial growth, with SIMCA in Périgny (1965) and CIT-Alcatel in La Rochelle (1970). Agriculture modernized, but rural exodus hit hard, with commune mergers like Montendre in 1972. Urbanization grew, with La Rochelle’s agglomeration exceeding 100,000 by 1975; tourism surged with the Oléron viaduct (1966) and La Palmyre Zoo (1967).

===== 1975-1990: Continued Modernization Against a Backdrop of Economic Crisis =====
A 1976 drought and 1982 floods hit hard. Agriculture shifted to cereals and oilseeds like sunflower. De-industrialization cut 10,000 jobs by 1985, with unemployment peaking above 15%. Peri-urbanization emerged, and infrastructure grew with the A10 freeway (1981) and Île de Ré bridge (1988). Royan became a tourist hub, hosting 400,000 visitors seasonally.

=== Charente-Maritime Today ===
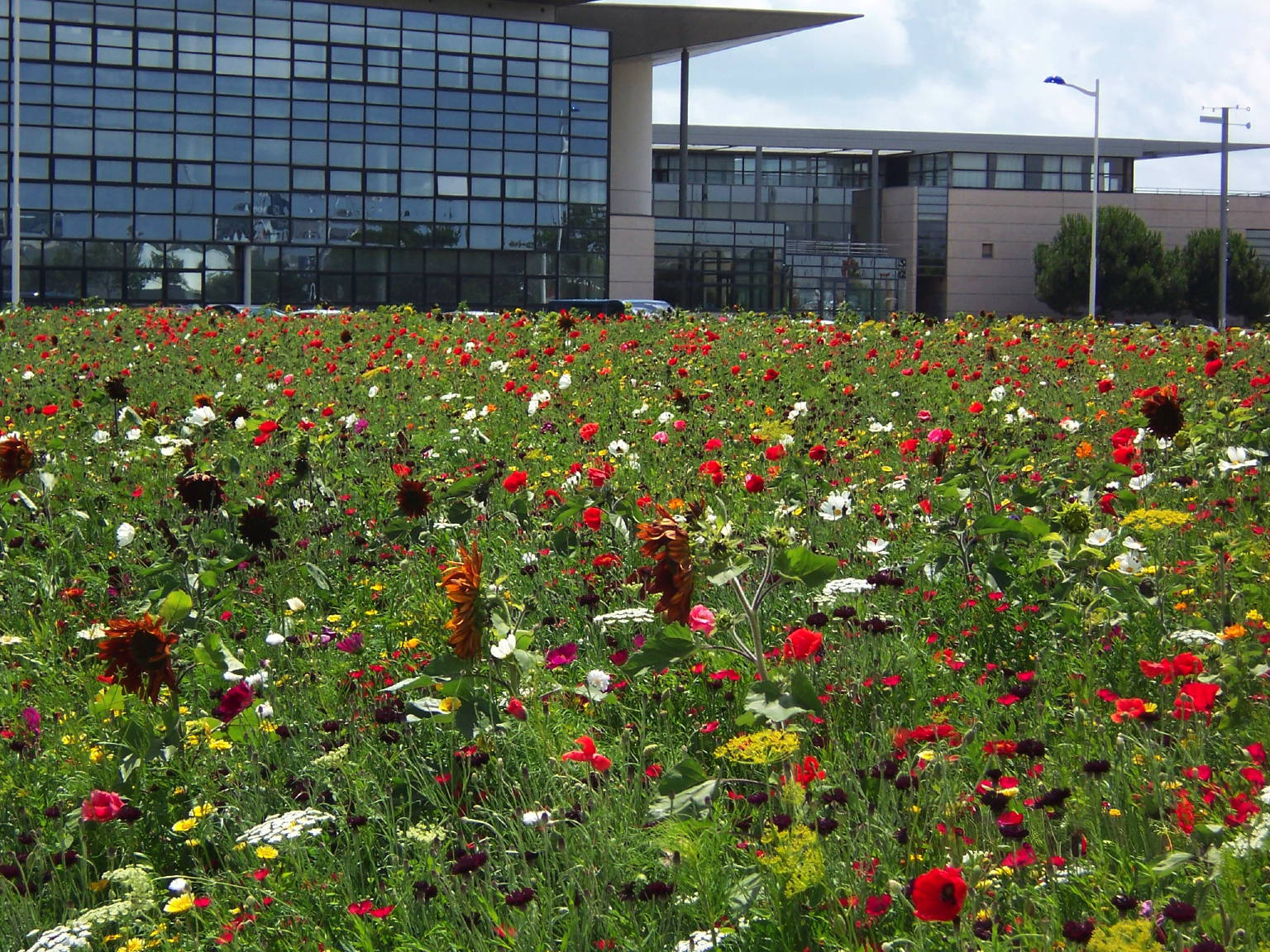
Science and Technology Center at La Rochelle University.

Since the 1990s, Charente-Maritime has transformed economically and socially, modernizing infrastructure with projects like the Martrou viaduct (1991), A837 freeway (1997), and Paris-La Rochelle TGV electrification (1993). La Rochelle University, founded in 1993, bolstered education and research. Tourism drives the economy, making it France’s second most popular destination, with attractions like Royan, La Palmyre Zoo, and La Rochelle Aquarium. Industry includes rail, aircraft, and yachting, alongside La Pallice port activities. Agriculture focuses on cereals, cognac, and pineau, while shellfish farming leads nationally in oysters and mussels. With over 605,000 residents, it’s the most populous and fastest-growing department in Poitou-Charentes. Natural disasters struck with Cyclone Martin (1999, 13 deaths, 197 km/h winds) and Cyclone Xynthia (2010, 12 deaths, coastal flooding), prompting a natural disaster declaration. After the 2015 Charlie Hebdo shooting, 30,000 marched in La Rochelle, with thousands more in Rochefort, Saintes, and Royan, supporting "Je suis Charlie."

== Geography ==
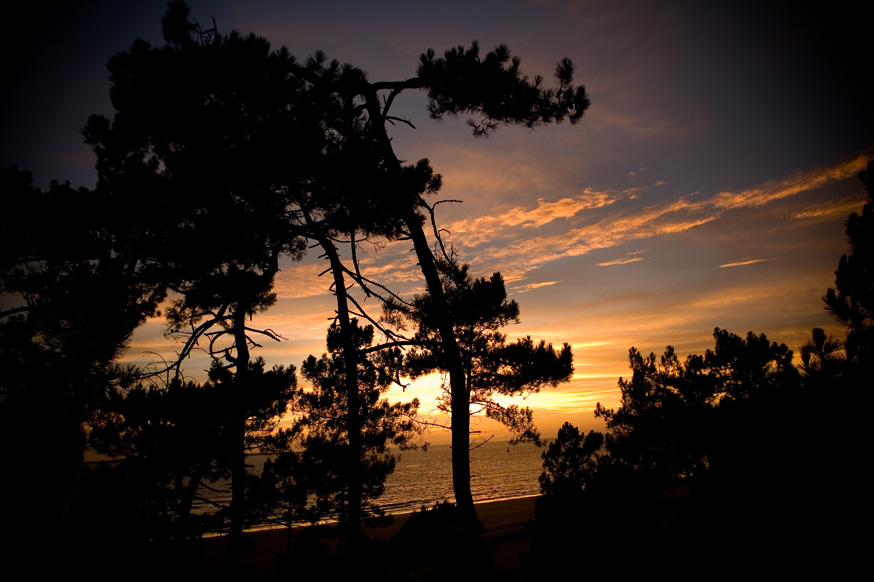
Sunset in Meschers-sur-Gironde in Charente-Maritime

Charente-Maritime is part of the Nouvelle-Aquitaine administrative region. It is bordered by the departments of Gironde, Charente, Deux-Sèvres, Dordogne and Vendée. It has a land area of 6864 km^{2} and 651,358 inhabitants as of 2019.

Major rivers are the Charente and its tributaries, the Boutonne and the Seugne, along with the Sèvre Niortaise, the Seudre and the Garonne, in its downstream part, which is the estuary of the Gironde.

The départment includes the islands of Île de Ré, Île d'Aix, Ile d'Oléron and Île Madame.

The department forms the northern part of the Aquitaine Basin. It is separated from the Massif Armoricain by the Marais Poitevin to the north-west and from the Parisian basin by the Seuil du Poitou to the north-east. The highest point in the department is in the forest of Chantemerlière, near the commune of Contré in the north-east, and rises to 173 m.

=== Administrative borders ===
Direction	Neighbour
North	Vendée of Pays de la Loire and Deux-Sèvres
East	Charente and Dordogne
West	Atlantic Ocean
South	Gironde and Gironde estuary

=== Principal towns ===
The most populous commune is La Rochelle, the prefecture. As of 2023, there are 7 communes with more than 8,000 inhabitants:

Commune	Population (2023)
La Rochelle	79,851
Saintes	25,363
Rochefort	23,460
Royan	19,425
Aytré	9,746
Périgny	8,877
Tonnay-Charente	8,289

== Climate ==
The climate is mild and sunny, with less than 900 mm of precipitation per year and with insolation being remarkably high, in fact, the highest in Western France including southernmost sea resorts such as Biarritz. Average extreme temperatures vary from 39 °C (102 °F) in summer to −5 °C (23 °F) in winter (as of 2022).

== Economy ==
The economy of Charente-Maritime is based on three major sectors: tourism, maritime industry, and manufacturing. Cognac and pineau are two of the major agricultural products with maize and sunflowers being the others.

Charente-Maritime is the headquarters of the major oyster producer Marennes-Oléron. Oysters cultivated here are shipped across Europe.

Rochefort is a shipbuilding site and has been a major French naval base since 1665.

La Rochelle is a seat of major French industry. Just outside the city, in Aytré, is a factory for the French engineering giant Alstom, where the TGV, the cars for the Paris and other metros are manufactured (see fr:Alstom Aytré). It is a popular venue for tourism, with its picturesque medieval harbour and city walls.

== Demographics ==
The inhabitants of the department are called Charentais-Maritimes in France.

Historical population

Year	Pop.	±% p.a.
1791	438,042	—
1801	399,162	−0.93%
1806	405,592	+0.32%
1821	409,477	+0.06%
1831	445,249	+0.84%
1841	460,245	+0.33%
1851	469,992	+0.21%
1861	481,060	+0.23%
1872	465,653	−0.30%
1881	466,416	+0.02%
1891	456,202	−0.22%
1901	452,149	−0.09%
1911	451,044	−0.02%
1921	418,310	−0.75%

Year	Pop.	±% p.a.
1931	415,249	−0.07%
1936	419,021	+0.18%
1946	416,187	−0.07%
1954	447,973	+0.92%
1962	470,897	+0.63%
1968	483,622	+0.45%
1975	497,859	+0.42%
1982	513,220	+0.44%
1990	527,146	+0.34%
1999	557,024	+0.61%
2007	605,410	+1.05%
2012	628,733	+0.76%
2017	644,303	+0.49%
2023	672,279	+0.71%

== Politics ==
=== Departmental Council of Charente-Maritime ===
Political map of the cantons of Charente-Maritime following the 2021 departmental elections.

The President of the Departmental Council has been Dominique Bussereau (LR) since 2008. He was replaced by Sylvie Marcilly after the departmental elections of June 2021.

=== National representation ===
Constituency	Member	Party
Charente-Maritime's 1st constituency	Olivier Falorni	Radical Party of the Left
Charente-Maritime's 2nd constituency	Benoît Biteau	The Ecologists
Charente-Maritime's 3rd constituency	Fabrice Barusseau	Socialist Party
Charente-Maritime's 4th constituency	Pascal Markowsky	National Rally
Charente-Maritime's 5th constituency	Christophe Plassard	Horizons

In the Senate, Charente-Maritime is represented by three members: Daniel Laurent (since 2008), Corinne Imbert (since 2014) and Mickaël Vallet (since 2020).

== Tourism ==
Popular destinations include La Rochelle, Royan, Saintes, Saint-Jean-d'Angély, Rochefort, the Île d'Aix, Île de Ré and Île d'Oléron.

The department is served by the TGV at Surgères and La Rochelle. It can also be reached by motorway by the A10 (E5, Paris-Bordeaux) and A837 (E602, Saintes-Rochefort).

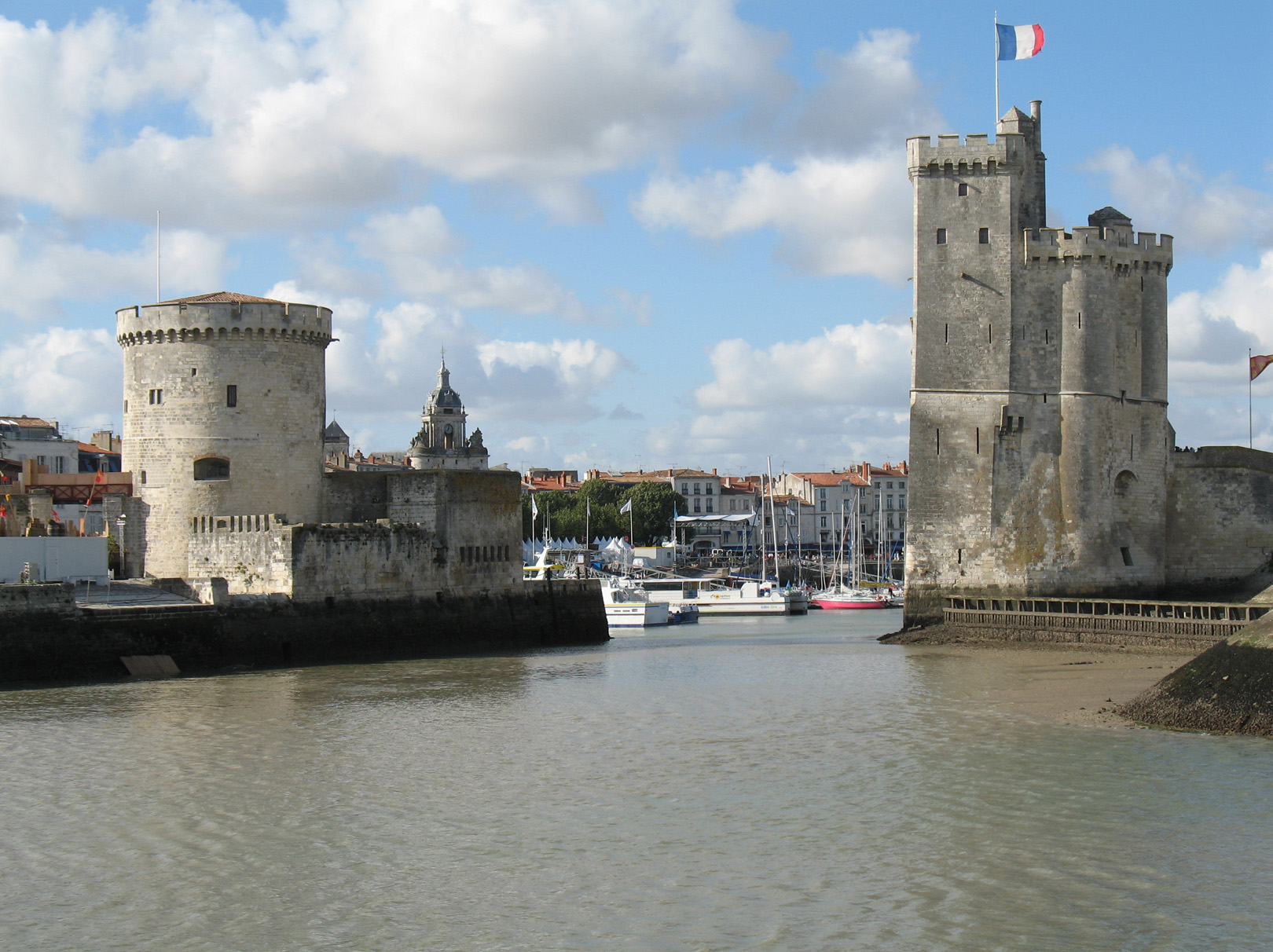
La Rochelle

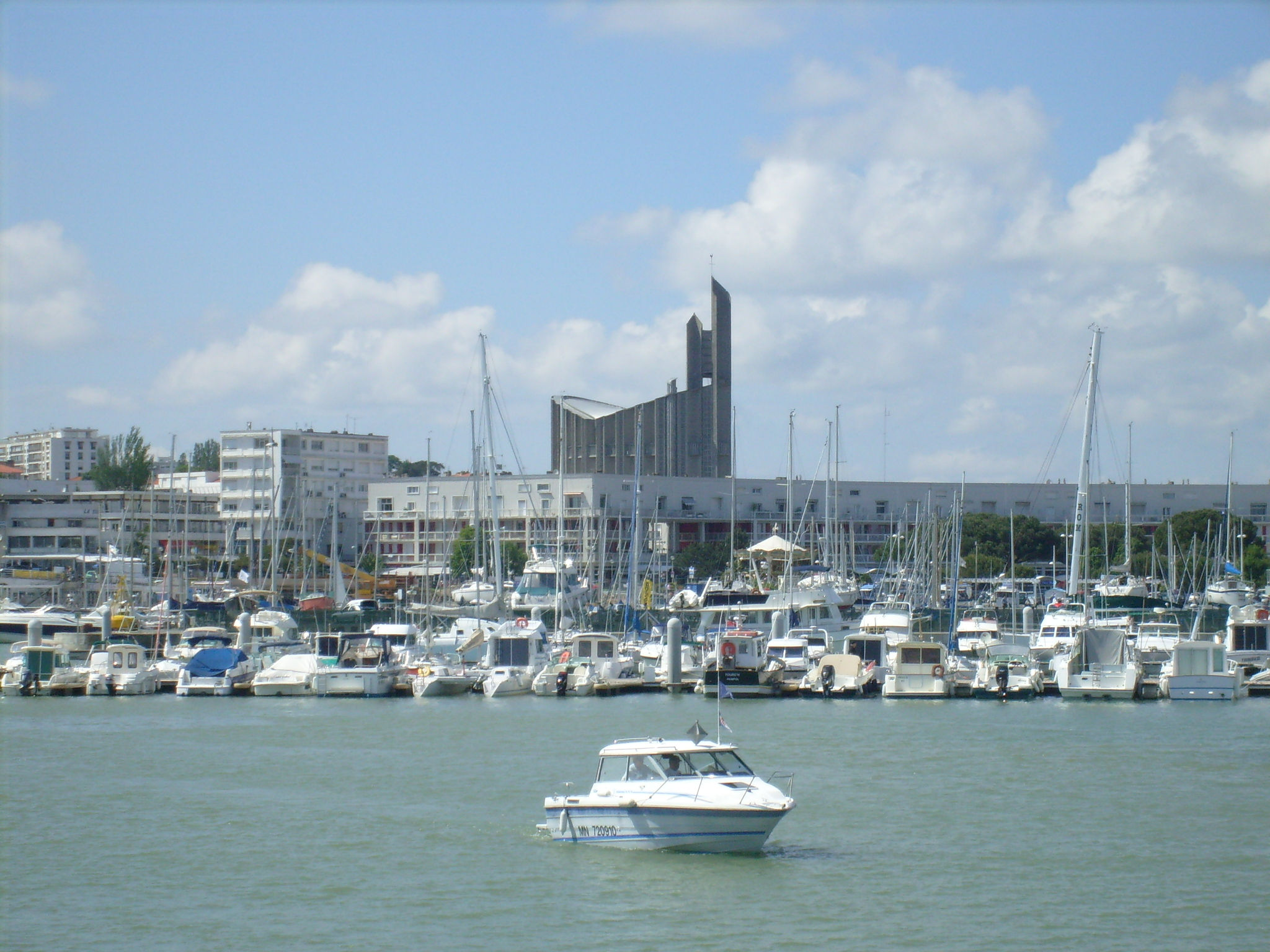
Royan, a seaside resort

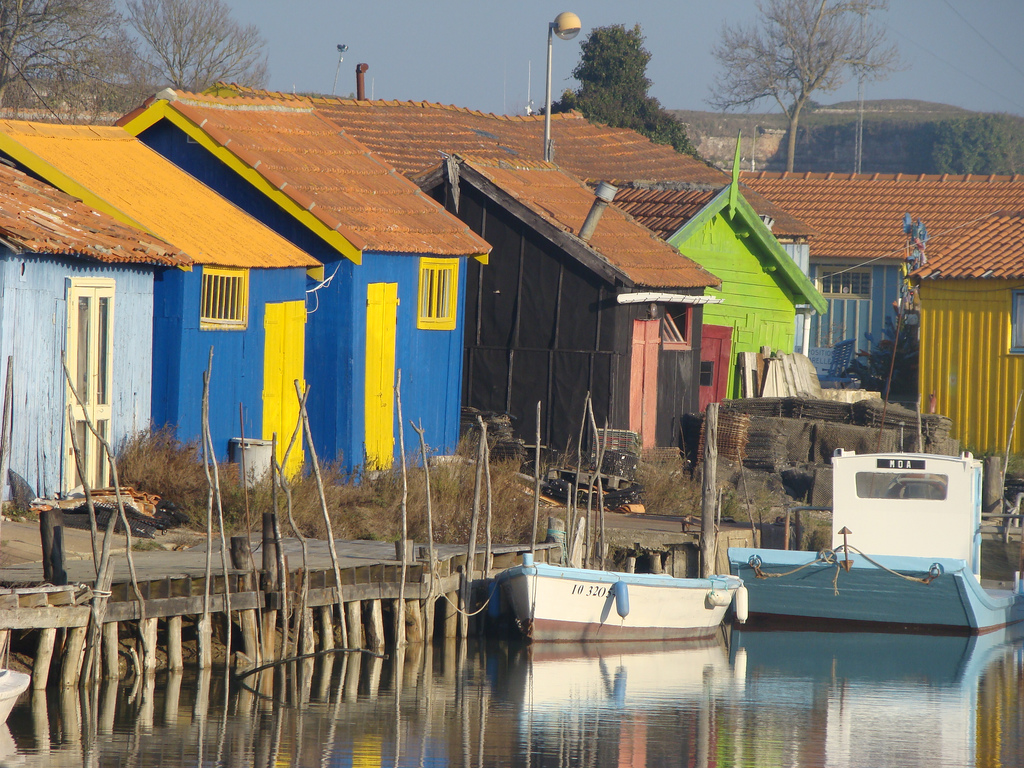
Oyster farms on the island of Oléron

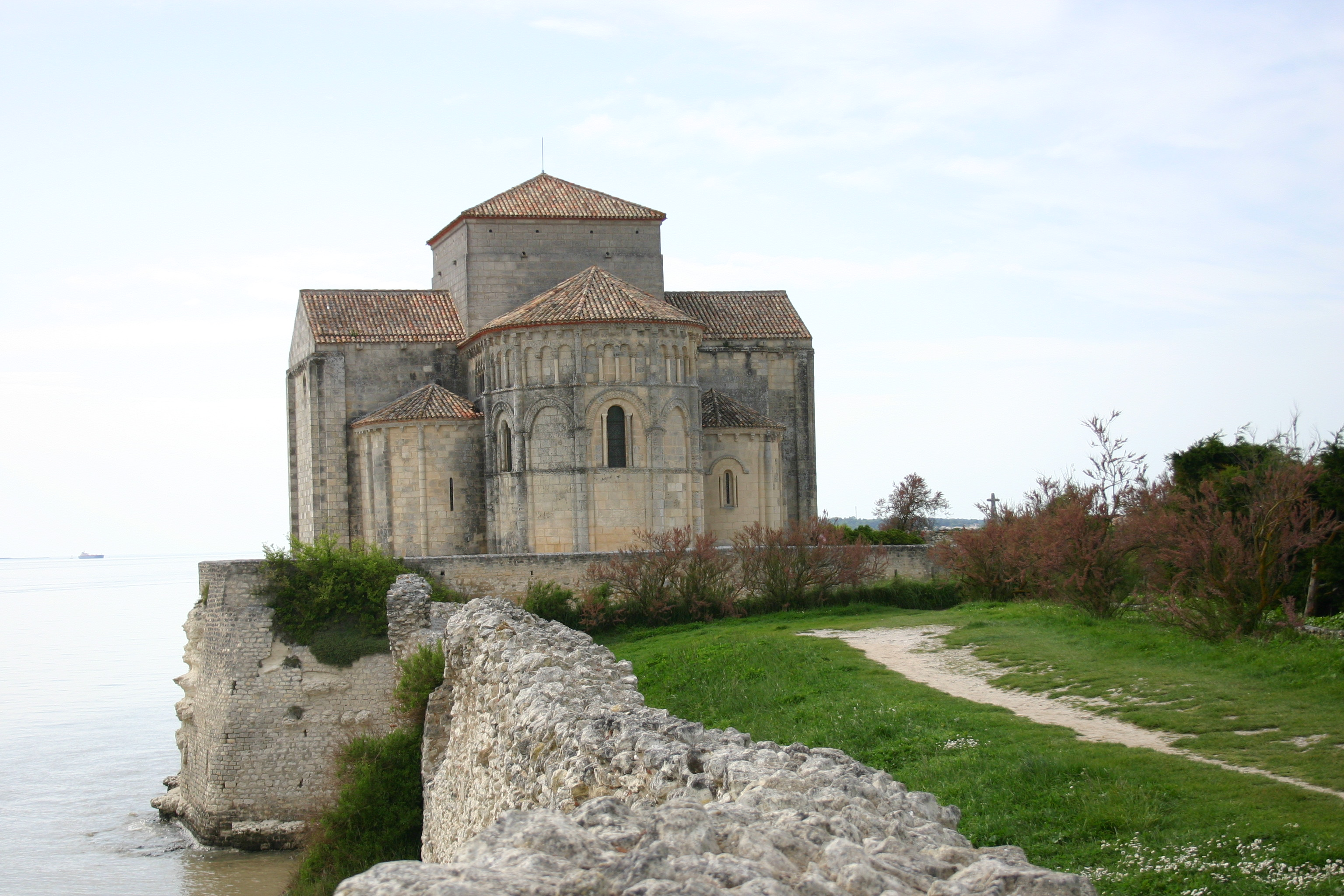
Talmont-sur-Gironde

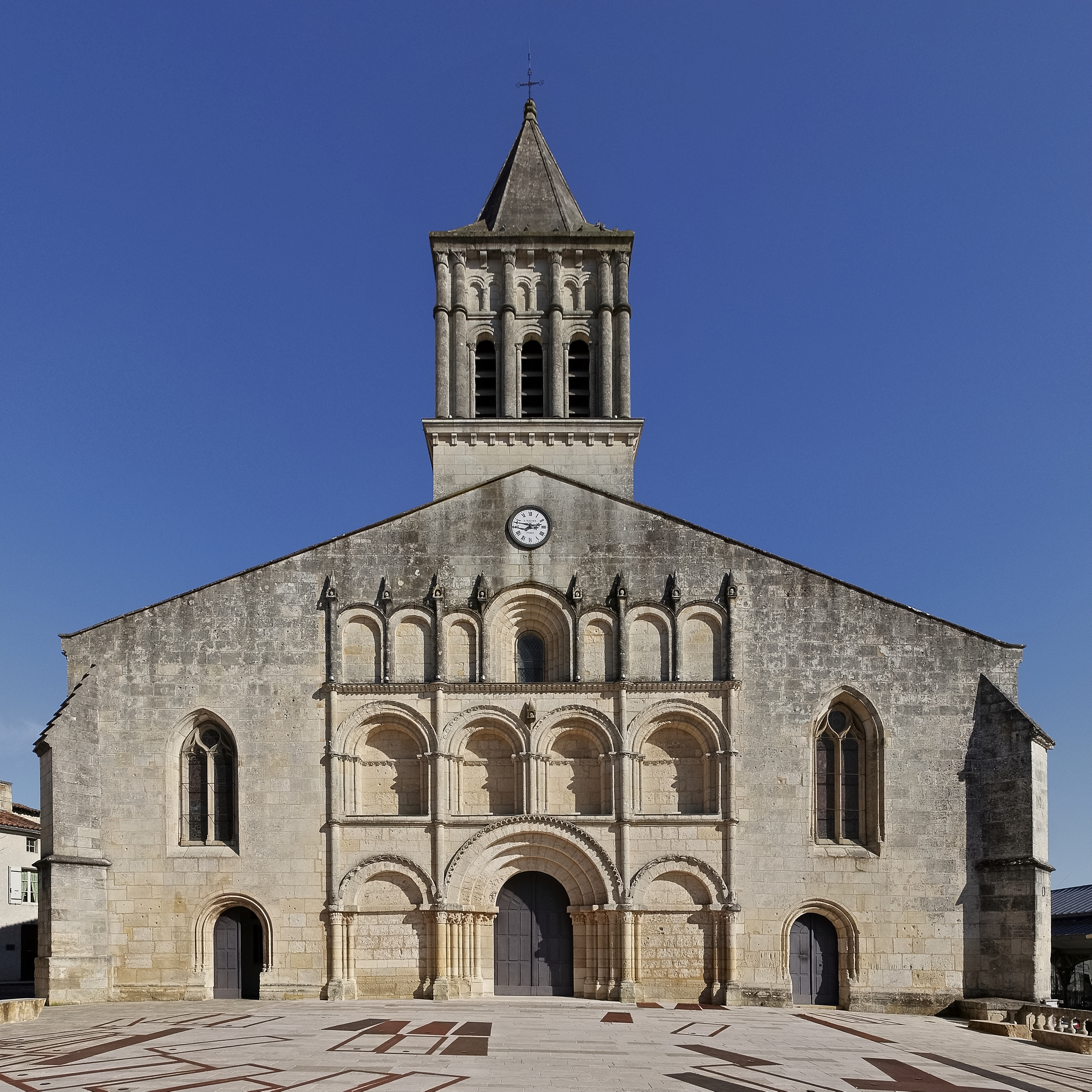
Jonzac

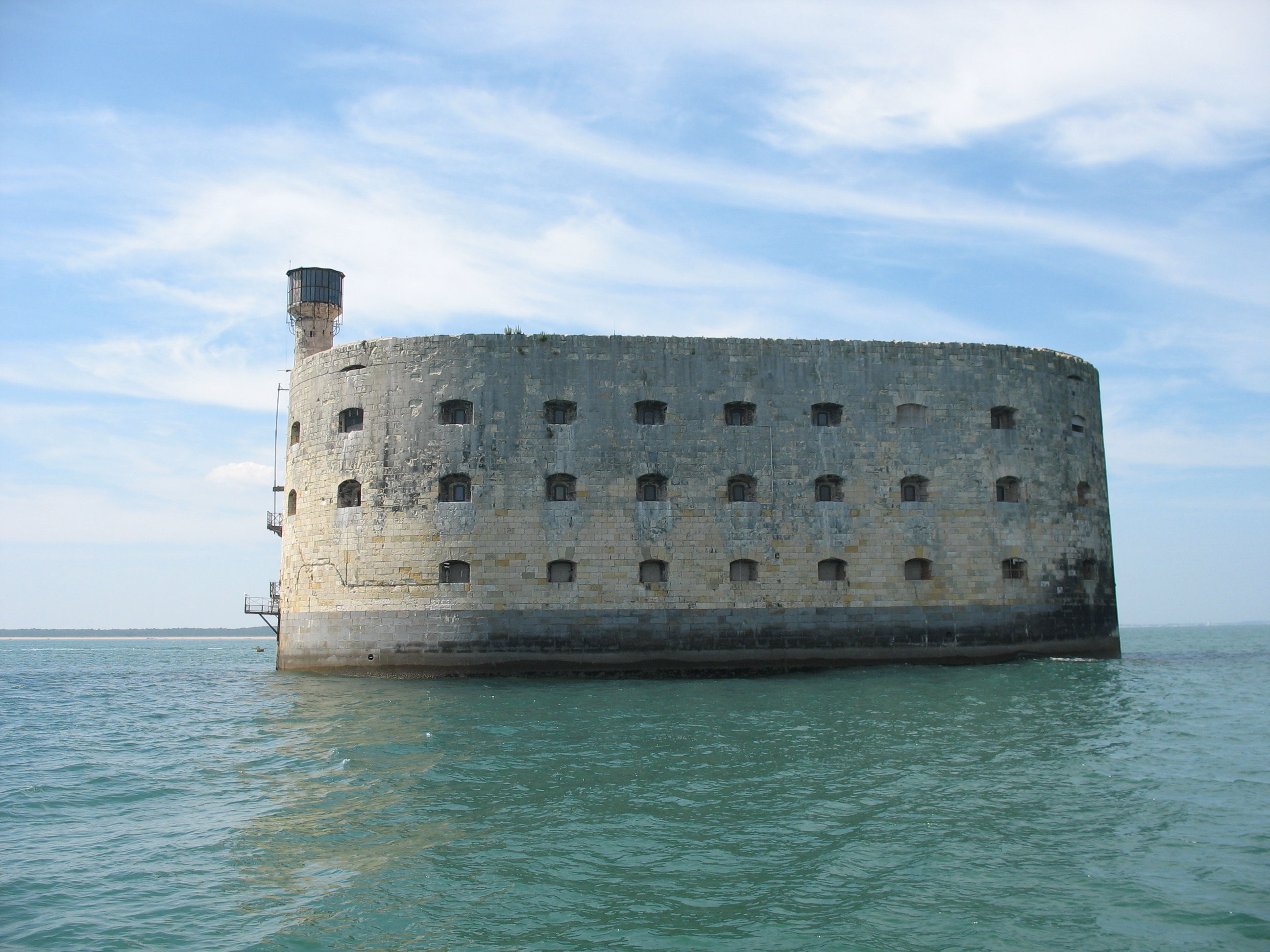
Fort Boyard

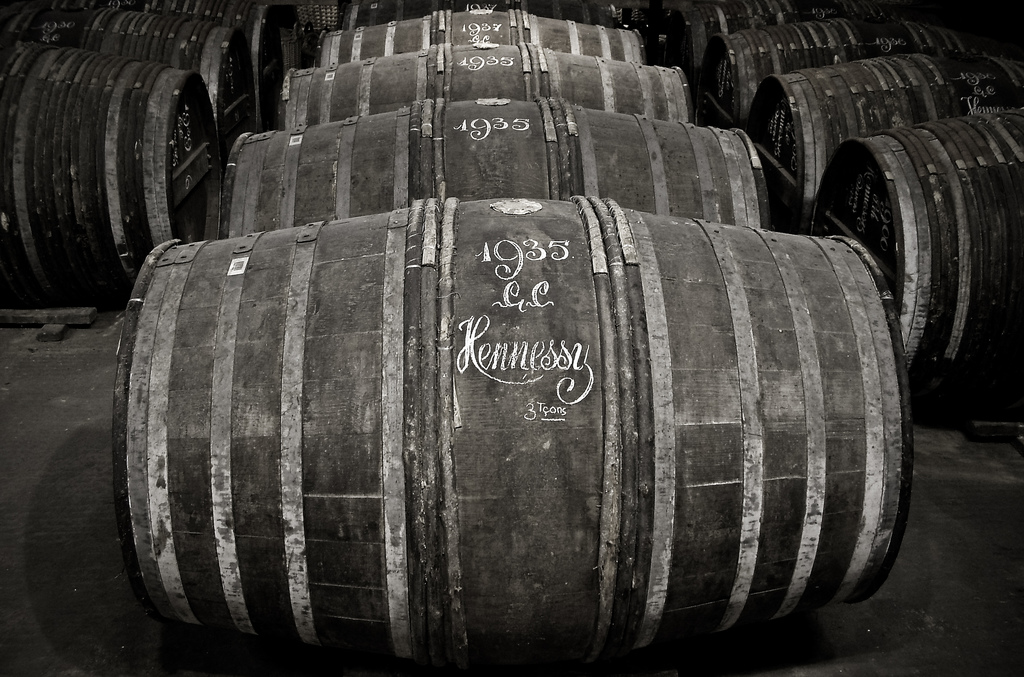
Barrels of Hennessy cognac

== See also ==
- Cantons of the Charente-Maritime department
- Communes of the Charente-Maritime department
- Arrondissements of the Charente-Maritime department
- Éclade des Moules
- Temple of the Moulin du Fâ

== Bibliography ==
- Jacques, Larfeuil; Robert, Brochot; Christian, Lorteau; René, Taillefet (1996). Aytré (in French). Maury Imprimeur. pp. 50–59. ISBN 2-9510454-0-9.
- Blier, Gérard (2003). Histoire des transports en Charente-Maritime [History of transport in Charente-Maritime] (in French). Le Croît vif.
- Canet, Louis (2005). Histoire de l'Aunis et de la Saintonge [History of Aunis and Saintonge] (in French). La Découvrance Editions. ISBN 978-2842653330.
- Combes, Jean; Bernard, Gilles; Daury, Jacques (1985). La Charente Maritime: paysages naturels, histoire, environnement, arts, culture, loisirs, gastronomie [Charente Maritime: natural landscapes, history, environment, arts, culture, leisure, gastronomy] (in French). Editions du Terroir. p. 463.
- Combes, Jean (2001). Histoire du Poitou et des Pays charentais : Deux-Sèvres, Vienne, Charente, Charente-Maritime [History of Poitou and the Charente region: Deux-Sèvres, Vienne, Charente, Charente-Maritime] (in French). Clermont-Ferrand: éditions Gérard Tisserand. p. 334. ISBN 2-84494-084-6.
- Crottet, Alexandre (1841). Histoire des Églises Réformées de Pons, Gémozac et Mortagne en Saintonge [History of the Reformed Churches of Pons, Gémozac and Mortagne in Saintonge] (in French). Bordeaux: A.Castillon. p. 263.
- Delayant, Léopold (1872). Histoire du département de la Charente-Inférieure [History of the department of Charente-Inférieure] (in French). H. Petit. p. 37.
- Delmas, Yves (1991). Royan (in French). Royan: Yves Delmas auteur-éditeur.
- Deveau, Jean-Michel (1974). Histoire de l'Aunis et de la Saintonge [History of Aunis and Saintonge] (in French). Presses universitaires de France. p. 126.
- Dubois, Louis-Marie (1890). Rochefort et les pontons de l'île d'Aix [Rochefort and the pontoons of the island of Aix] (in French). Librairie Catholique Libaros. p. 326.
- Ducluzeau, Francine (2001). Histoire des Protestants charentais (Aunis, Saintonge, Angoumois) [History of the Charente Protestants (Aunis, Saintonge, Angoumois)] (in French). Le Croît vif. p. 370. ISBN 9782907967549.
- Couneau, Émile (1904). La Rochelle disparue [La Rochelle disappeared] (in French).
- Duguet, Jacques; Deveau, Jean-Michel (1977). L'Aunis et la Saintonge : histoire par les documents [Aunis and Saintonge: history through documents] (in French). C.R.D.P.
- Dupont, Édouard (1830). Histoire de la Rochelle [History of La Rochelle] (in French). chez Mareschal, imprimeur de la préfecture. p. 651.
- Flohic, Jean-Louis (2002). Le patrimoine des communes de la Charente-Maritime [The heritage of the communes of Charente-Maritime] (in French). éditions Flohic. ISBN 2-84234-129-5.
- Genet, Christian (2007). Les deux Charentes du XXe siècle : 1945-2000 [The two Charentes of the 20th century: 1945-2000] (in French). Aubin Imprimeur.
- Genet, Christian; Moreau, Louis (1983). Les deux Charentes sous l'occupation et la résistance [The two Charentes under occupation and resistance] (in French). Gémozac: La Caillerie. p. 221.
- Julien-Labruyere, François (1980). "A la recherche de la Saintonge maritime" [In search of maritime Saintonge]. Norois (in French). 114: 140.
- Lebègue, Antoine (1992). Histoire des Aquitains [History of the Aquitains] (in French). éditions Sud-Ouest. p. 317. ISBN 9782879010724.
- Le Grelle, Maxime (1998). Brouage Quebec Foi De Pionniers [Brouage Quebec Pioneer Faith] (in French). Saint-Jean-d'Angély: éditions Bordessoules.
- Lormier, Dominique (2007). La Libération de la France : Aquitaine, Auvergne, Charentes, Limousin, Midi-Pyrénées [The Liberation of France: Aquitaine, Auvergne, Charentes, Limousin, Midi-Pyrénées] (in French). Éditions Lucien Sourny. p. 185. ISBN 978-2848860657.
- Massiou, Daniel (1838). Histoire politique, civile et religieuse de la Saintonge et de l'Aunis, t. I [Political, civil and religious history of Saintonge and Aunis, vol. I] (in French). Paris: Pannier. p. 575.
- Massiou, Daniel (1846a). Histoire politique, civile et religieuse de la Saintonge et de l'Aunis, t. II [Political, civil and religious history of Saintonge and Aunis, vol. II] (in French). Saintes: Charrier. p. 487.
- Massiou, Daniel (1846b). Histoire politique, civile et religieuse de la Saintonge et de l'Aunis, t. III [Political, civil and religious history of Saintonge and Aunis, vol. III] (in French). Saintes: Charrier. p. 517.
- Massiou, Daniel (1836). Histoire politique, civile et religieuse de la Saintonge et de l'Aunis, t. IV [Political, civil and religious history of Saintonge and Aunis, vol. IV] (in French). La Rochelle: F.Lacurie. p. 551.
- Moissan, Joseph (1894). Le Prince Noir en Aquitaine (1355-1356) - (1362-1370) [The Black Prince in Aquitaine (1355-1356) - (1362-1370)] (in French). Paris: A. Picard et fils. p. 294.
- Mounier, Bernard (2004). Talmont et Merveilles sur la Gironde [Talmont and Wonders on the Gironde] (in French). éditions Bonne-Anse.
- Rayssinguier, Pierre (2001). Saintes, plus de 2000 ans d'histoire illustrée [Saintes, more than 2000 years of illustrated history] (in French). Saintes: Société d'archéologie et d'histoire de la Charente-Maritime.
- Soumagne, Jean (1987). "La Charente-Maritime aujourd'hui, Milieu, Économie, Aménagement" [Charente-Maritime today, Environment, Economy, Planning]. Norois (in French). 139: 399.
- Tesseron, Gaston (1955). La Charente sous Louis XIII [Charente under Louis XIII] (in French). Rouillac: Editions Librairie Perriol. p. 256. ISBN 2951471106.
- Foletier, François de Vaux de (1929). Histoire d'Aunis et de Saintonge [History of Aunis and Saintonge] (in French). Princi Negue.
- Boutinet, Jean-Pierre (2001). Charente-Maritime (in French). Bonneton. ISBN 9782862532776.
- Combes, Jean; Luc, Michel (1981). La Charente-Maritime: l'Aunis et la Saintonge des origines à nos jours [Charente-Maritime: Aunis and Saintonge from their origins to the present day] (in French). Editions Bordessoules. ISBN 9782903504038.
- Salles, Catherine (2000). l'Antiquité romaine, des origines à la chute de l'Empire [Roman Antiquity, from the origins to the fall of the Empire] (in French). Larousse-Bordas/HER. p. 504. ISBN 9782402318792.
- Senillou, Pierre (1990). Pons à travers l'histoire [Pons through history] (in French). Éditions Bordessoules. ISBN 9782903504465.
- Grimal, Pierre (1993). L'Empire romain [The Roman Empire] (in French). éditions du Fallois. ISBN 9782253064862.
- Cassagne, Jean-Marie; Korsak, Mariola (2002). Origine des noms de villes et villages [Origin of town and village names] (in French). éditions Bordessoules.
- Rymer, Thomas (1739). Abrégé historique des actes publics d'Angleterre [Historical abridgement of the public acts of England] (in French). apud Joannem Neauline.
- Favier, Jean (1980). La Guerre de Cent Ans [The Hundred Years' War] (in French). éditions Fayard. ISBN 978-2213008981. OCLC 1014769276.
- Malet, Albert (2022). Nouvelle Histoire de France [New History of France] (in French). Legare Street Press. ISBN 978-1019281963.
- Vallée, Sylvain; Nury, Fabien (2007). Il était une fois la France [Once upon a time there was France] (in French). Glénat. ISBN 9782723455800.
- Papy, Louis (1940). Aunis et Saintonge [Aunis and Saintonge]. Revue géographique des Pyrénées et du Sud-Ouest. Sud-Ouest Européen (in French). Vol. 11. Arthaud. pp. 55–57.
- Collectif (1994). Charente-Maritime. Saintonge (in French). Gallimard Loisirs. ISBN 9782742402465.
