= Arrondissements of the Charente-Maritime department =

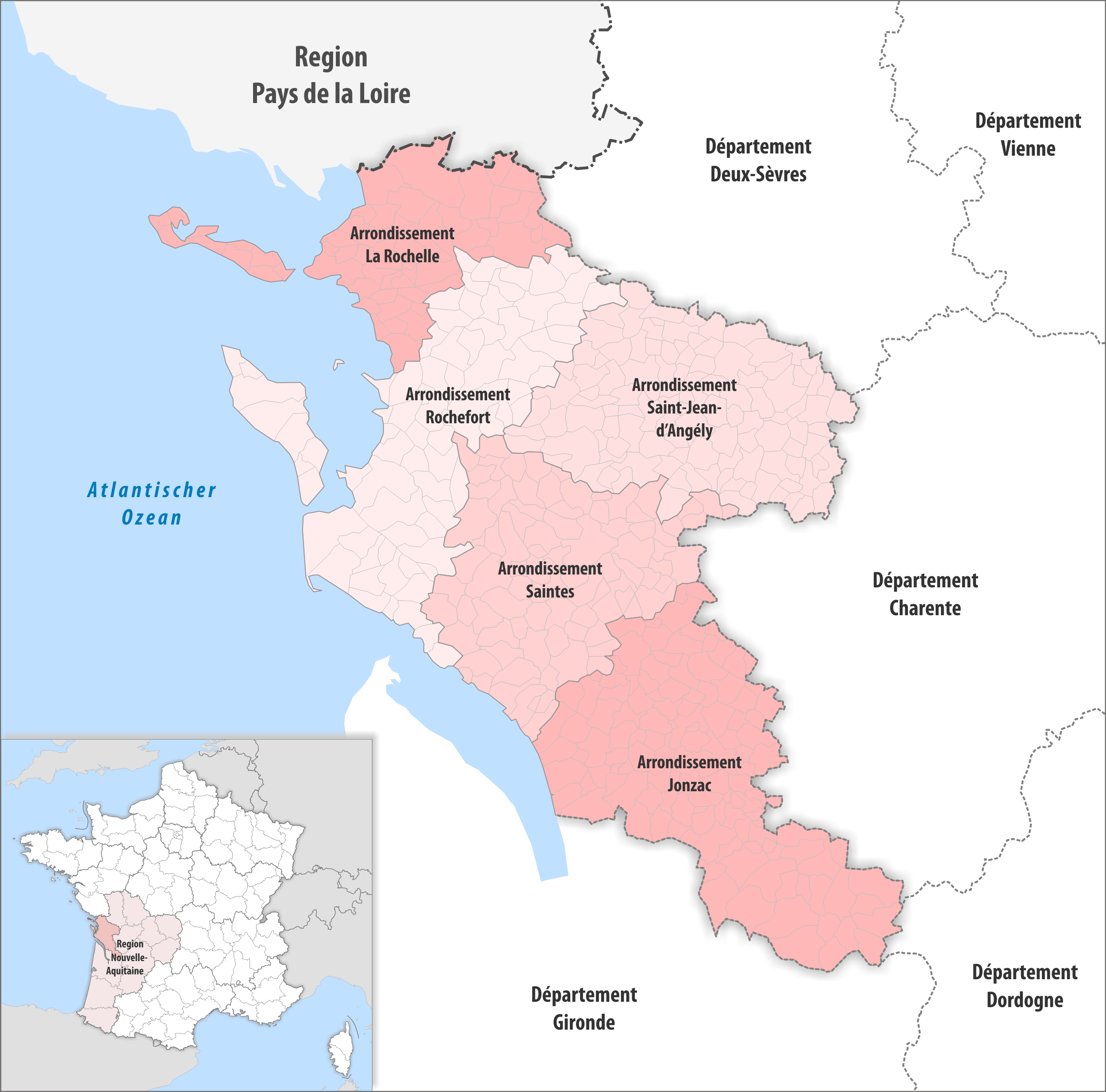
Map of arrondissements of the Charente-Maritime department.

The 5 arrondissements of the Charente-Maritime department are:

1. Arrondissement of Jonzac, (subprefecture: Jonzac) with 129 communes. The population of the arrondissement was 68,476 in 2021.
2. Arrondissement of Rochefort, (subprefecture: Rochefort) with 78 communes. The population of the arrondissement was 194,579 in 2021.
3. Arrondissement of La Rochelle, (prefecture of the Charente-Maritime department: La Rochelle) with 58 communes. The population of the arrondissement was 227,693 in 2021.
4. Arrondissement of Saintes, (subprefecture: Saintes) with 88 communes. The population of the arrondissement was 118,506 in 2021.
5. Arrondissement of Saint-Jean-d'Angély, (subprefecture: Saint-Jean-d'Angély) with 110 communes. The population of the arrondissement was 52,150 in 2021.

== History ==
In 1800 the arrondissements of Saintes, Jonzac, Marennes, Rochefort, La Rochelle and Saint-Jean-d'Angély were established. La Rochelle replaced Saintes as prefecture in 1810. The arrondissements of Marennes and Saint-Jean-d'Angély were disbanded in 1926. The arrondissement of Saint-Jean-d'Angély was restored in 1943.

The borders of the arrondissements of Charente-Maritime were modified in January 2017:

- two communes from the arrondissement of Rochefort to the arrondissement of La Rochelle
- one commune from the arrondissement of La Rochelle to the arrondissement of Rochefort
- 17 communes from the arrondissement of Saintes to the arrondissement of Jonzac
- one commune from the arrondissement of Saintes to the arrondissement of Rochefort
- three communes from the arrondissement of Saint-Jean-d'Angély to the arrondissement of Rochefort
