= Chauffeurs de la Drôme =

French criminal gang

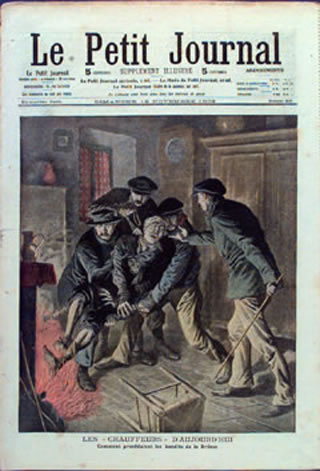
The Chauffeurs de la Drôme torture a victim, Le Petit Journal, 15 November 1908

The Chauffeurs de la Drôme (The Heaters of Drôme) was a gang of four French criminals who were responsible for a wave of theft, torture, and murder in the department of Drôme in southeast France during the early years of the twentieth century.

Three were executed in September 1909; the fourth, captured later, was sentenced to life imprisonment with hard labour at the penal colony on Devil's Island, French Guiana, (tantamount to a death sentence, aka "Dry Guillotine"), and died there.

== Criminal career ==
The four men were Octave-Louis David (b.1873), Pierre-Augustin-Louis Berruyer (b.1873), both shoemakers; Urban-Célestin Liottard (b.1863), a labourer, and Jean Lamarque.

David had a long criminal career and was claimed to be the ringleader. He had met Lamarque in prison, and through him met Berruyer. Beurruyer's house in Romans-sur-Isère was where Lamarque and the fourth man, Liottard, lived as boarders.

The gang typically carried out home invasions on remote, rural dwellings, where they tortured householders into revealing the locations of hidden valuables by burning their feet. This form of banditry was not unknown in France; criminals who did this were widely known as chauffeurs (heaters).

The Chauffeurs de la Drôme were responsible for as many as 18 murders between 1905 and 1908. They were able to avoid suspicion by maintaining their legitimate occupations during the day, carrying out attacks at night.

== Arrest, trial and execution ==
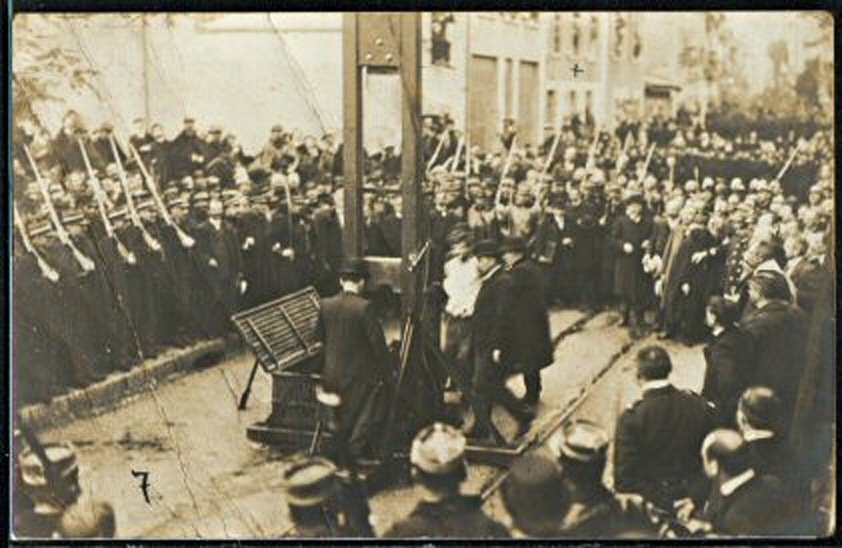
David, the first to be executed, being led to the guillotine. Valence, 22 September 1909

Berruyer was arrested on 22 October 1908 at his house; a search of the house revealed a large cache of stolen items. Liottard and David were arrested soon after but the fourth man, Lamarque, escaped. Their eight-day trial began at Valence, Drôme on 2 July 1909. All four men were convicted and sentenced to death. Armand Fallières, the President of France at the time, was personally opposed to the death penalty, but the strength of public opinion made it impossible for him to accept their pleas for clemency.

The executions by guillotine of David, Berruyer and Liottard took place at Valence, Drôme, on 22 September 1909 at 6 am, within the space of a few minutes and before a cheering crowd. A number of photographs were taken despite this being against the law; postcards were widely sold, and there were newspaper advertisements for public showings of motion pictures of the executions.

Lamarque was captured in 1910. He had been sentenced to death in absentia, but after his capture his sentence was commuted to life imprisonment with hard labour in the penal colony at Devil's Island.
