= Chauffeur (criminal) =

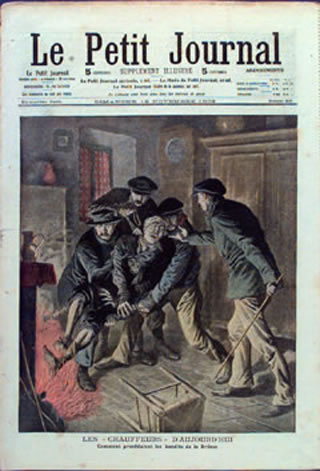
The Chauffeurs de la Drome torture a victim, Le Petit Journal, 15 November 1908

A chauffeur (French pronunciation: [ʃofœʁ]; lit. 'heater upper') was a type of French criminal active from the 18th to the 20th centuries. In gangs, they carried out home invasions on remote rural dwellings, then tortured the householders into revealing the hiding places of savings or valuables. This was often done by burning victims' feet in the fireplace, which gave rise to their name.

Many such gangs were active in the Nord department during the period of the French Directory (1795–1799) when there was widespread violent crime in the French countryside. In the 20th century, a notable gang was the Chauffeurs de la Drôme, who were responsible for eighteen murders between 1905 and 1908.

These attacks continued after the Second World War. Le gang des Romanis was active in Bourgogne and Le Gang d’Albert was active in Picardy until their leaders were separately captured and executed in 1952.
