= List of MPs who lost their seat in the 2017 French legislative election =

This is a list of MPs who lost their seat at the 2017 French legislative election. All of these députés sat in the 14th legislature of the French Fifth Republic but were not returned to Parliament in the elections. In total, incumbent 206 members of the National Assembly were defeated in the landslide victory of Emmanuel Macron and La République En Marche!. 75% of all Members of Parliament elected to the National Assembly are newcomers.

== List ==
Party	Name	Constituency	Year elected	Seat held by party since	Defeated by	Party
Socialist	Karine Berger	Hautes-Alpes's 1st constituency	2012	2012	Pascale Boyer	En Marche!
Socialist	Sabine Buis	Ardèche's 3rd constituency	2012	2012	Fabrice Brun	Republican
Socialist	Christophe Leonard	Ardennes's 2nd constituency	2012	1997	Pierre Cordier	Republican
Socialist	Alain Fauré	Ariège's 2nd constituency	2012	1997	Michel Larive	La France Insoumise
Socialist	Jean-Claude Perez	Aude's 1st constituency	1997	1997	Danièle Hérin	En Marche!
Socialist	Marie-Hélène Fabre	Aude's 2nd constituency	2012	1997	Alain Péréa	En Marche!
Socialist	Patrick Mennucci	Bouches-du-Rhône's 4th constituency	2012	2007	Jean-Luc Mélenchon	La France Insoumise
Socialist	Henri Jibrayel	Bouches-du-Rhône's 7th constituency	2012	1997	Saïd Ahamada	En Marche!
Socialist	Jean-David Ciot	Bouches-du-Rhône's 14th constituency	2012	2012	Anne-Laurence Petel	En Marche!
Socialist	Clotilde Valter	Calvados's 3rd constituency	2012	2012	Sébastien Leclerc	Republican
Socialist	Martine Pinville	Charente's 1st constituency	2012	1997	Thomas Mesnier	En Marche!
Socialist	Yann Galut	Cher's 3rd constituency	2012	2012	Loïc Kervran	En Marche!
Socialist	Philippe Nauche	Corrèze's 2nd constituency	2007	2007	Frédérique Meunier	Republican
Socialist	Michel Lesage	Côtes-d'Armor's 1st constituency	2012	1997	Bruno Joncour	Democratic Movement
Socialist	Viviane Le Dissez	Côtes-d'Armor's 2nd constituency	2012	1981	Hervé Berville	En Marche!
Socialist	Annie Le Houérou (elected as DVG)	Côtes-d'Armor's 4th constituency	2012	1997	Yannick Kerlogot	En Marche!
Socialist	Michel Vergnier	Creuse's constituency	1997	1997	Jean-Baptiste Moreau	En Marche!
Socialist	Colette Langlade	Dordogne's 3rd constituency	2008	2007	Jean-Pierre Cubertafon	Democratic Movement
Socialist	Barbara Romagnan	Doubs's 1st constituency	2012	2012	Fannette Charvier	En Marche!
Socialist	Jean-Jacques Urvoas	Finistère's 1st constituency	2007	2007	Annaïg Le Meur	En Marche!
Socialist	Patricia Adam	Finistère's 2nd constituency	2002	1997	Jean-Charles Larsonneur	En Marche!
Socialist	Gwenegan Bui	Finistère's 4th constituency	2012	1997	Sandrine Le Feur	En Marche!
Socialist	Chantal Guittet	Finistère's 5th constituency	2012	2012	Graziella Melchior	En Marche!
Socialist	Fabrice Verdier	Gard's 4th constituency	2012	2012	Annie Chapelier	En Marche!
Socialist	Catherine Lemorton	Haute-Garonne's 1st constituency	2007	2007	Pierre Cabaré	En Marche!
Socialist	Gérard Bapt	Haute-Garonne's 2nd constituency	1997	1997	Jean-Luc Lagleize	Democratic Movement
Socialist	Martine Martinel	Haute-Garonne's 4th constituency	2007	2007	Mickaël Nogal	En Marche!
Socialist	Christophe Borgel	Haute-Garonne's 9th constituency	2012	2012	Sandrine Mörch	En Marche!
Socialist	Kader Arif	Haute-Garonne's 10th constituency	2012	2012	Sébastien Nadot	En Marche!
Socialist	Michèle Delaunay	Gironde's 2nd constituency	2007	2007	Catherine Fabre	En Marche!
Socialist	Pascale Got	Gironde's 5th constituency	2007	2007	Benoît Simian	En Marche!
Socialist	Marie Récalde	Gironde's 6th constituency	2012	1997	Éric Poulliat	En Marche!
Socialist	Gilles Savary	Gironde's 9th constituency	2012	2007	Sophie Mette	Democratic Movement
Socialist	Fanny Dombre-Coste	Hérault's 3rd constituency	2012	2012	Coralie Dubost	En Marche!
Socialist	Frédéric Roig	Hérault's 4th constituency	2012	2012	Jean-François Eliaou	En Marche!
Socialist	Sébastien Denaja	Hérault's 7th constituency	2012	2012	Christophe Euzet	En Marche!
Socialist	Christian Assaf	Hérault's 8th constituency	2012	2012	Nicolas Démoulin	En Marche!
Socialist	Marie-Anne Chapdelaine	Ille-et-Vilaine's 1st constituency	2012	1981	Mostapha Laabid	En Marche!
Socialist	Jean-Paul Chanteguet	Indre's 1st constituency	2012	2007	François Jolivet	En Marche!
Socialist	Isabelle Bruneau	Indre's 2nd constituency	2012	2012	Nicolas Forissier	Republican
Socialist	Jean-Patrick Gille	Indre-et-Loire's 1st constituency	2007	2007	Philippe Chalumeau	En Marche!
Socialist	Marisol Touraine	Indre-et-Loire's 3rd constituency	2007	2007	Sophie Auconie	Union of Democrats and Independents
Socialist	Laurent Baumel	Indre-et-Loire's 4th constituency	2012	2012	Fabienne Colboc	En Marche!
Socialist	Michel Destot	Isère's 3rd constituency	1988	1988	Émilie Chalas	En Marche!
Socialist	Erwann Binet	Isère's 8th constituency	2012	2012	Caroline Abadie	En Marche!
Socialist	Joëlle Huillier	Isère's 10th constituency	2012	2012	Marjolaine Meynier-Millefert	En Marche!
Socialist	Denys Robiliard	Loir-et-Cher's 1st constituency	2012	2012	Marc Fesneau	Democratic Movement
Socialist	Karine Daniel	Loire-Atlantique's 3rd constituency	2016	1988	Anne-France Brunet	En Marche!
Socialist	Dominique Raimbourg	Loire-Atlantique's 4th constituency	2007	1988	Aude Amadou	En Marche!
Socialist	Michel Ménard	Loire-Atlantique's 5th constituency	2007	2007	Sarah El Haïry	Democratic Movement
Socialist	Valérie Corre	Loiret's 6th constituency	2012	2012	Richard Ramos	Democratic Movement
Socialist	Lucette Lousteau	Lot-et-Garonne's 1st constituency	2012	2012	Michel Lauzzana	En Marche!
Socialist	Matthias Fekl	Lot-et-Garonne's 2nd constituency	2012	2012	Alexandre Freschi	En Marche!
Socialist	Luc Belot	Maine-et-Loire's 1st constituency	2012	2012	Matthieu Orphelin	En Marche!
Socialist	Chaynesse Khirouni	Meurthe-et-Moselle's 1st constituency	2012	2012	Carole Grandjean	En Marche!
Socialist	Hervé Féron	Meurthe-et-Moselle's 2nd constituency	2007	2007	Laurent Garcia	Democratic Movement
Socialist	Christian Eckert	Meurthe-et-Moselle's 3rd constituency	2012	2012	Xavier Paluszkiewicz	En Marche!
Socialist	Jean-Louis Dumont	Meuse's 2nd constituency	1997	1997	Émilie Cariou	En Marche!
Socialist	Aurélie Filippetti	Moselle's 1st constituency	2012	2012	Belkhir Belhaddad	En Marche!
Socialist	Paola Zanetti	Moselle's 7th constituency	2012	2012	Hélène Zannier	En Marche!
Socialist	Christian Paul	Nièvre's 2nd constituency	2012	1997	Patrice Perrot	En Marche!
Socialist	Audrey Linkenheld	Nord's 2nd constituency	2012	1973	Ugo Bernalicis	La France Insoumise
Socialist	Rémi Pauvros	Nord's 3rd constituency	2012	2007	Christophe Di Pompeo	En Marche!
Socialist	Jean-Jacques Cottel	Pas-de-Calais's 1st constituency	2012	2007	Bruno Duvergé	Democratic Movement
Socialist	Yann Capet	Pas-de-Calais's 7th constituency	2012	1997	Pierre-Henri Dumont	Republican
Socialist	Philippe Kemel	Pas-de-Calais's 11th constituency	2012	1988	Marine Le Pen	National Rally
Socialist	Nathalie Chabanne	Pyrénées-Atlantiques's 2nd constituency	2012	2012	Jean-Paul Mattei	Democratic Movement
Socialist	Colette Capdevielle	Pyrénées-Atlantiques's 5th constituency	2012	2012	Florence Lasserre-David	Democratic Movement
Socialist	Sylviane Alaux	Pyrénées-Atlantiques's 6th constituency	2012	2012	Vincent Bru	Democratic Movement
Socialist	Jean Glavany	Hautes-Pyrénées's 1st constituency	2012	1995	Jean-Bernard Sempastous	En Marche!
Socialist	Ségolène Neuville	Pyrénées-Orientales's 3rd constituency	2012	2012	Laurence Gayte	En Marche!
Socialist	Éric Elkouby	Bas-Rhin's 1st constituency	2016	1997	Thierry Michels	En Marche!
Socialist	Philippe Bies	Bas-Rhin's 2nd constituency	2012	1997	Sylvain Waserman	En Marche!
Socialist	Renaud Gauquelin	Rhône's 7th constituency	2016	1997	Anissa Khedher	En Marche!
Socialist	Philippe Baumel	Saône-et-Loire's 3rd constituency	2012	2012	Rémy Rebeyrotte	En Marche!
Socialist	Christophe Sirugue	Saône-et-Loire's 5th constituency	2007	2007	Raphaël Gauvain	En Marche!
Socialist	Françoise Dubois	Sarthe's 1st constituency	2012	2012	Damien Pichereau	En Marche!
Socialist	Bernadette Laclais	Savoie's 4th constituency	2012	2012	Patrick Mignola	Democratic Movement
Socialist	Annick Lepetit	Paris's 3rd constituency	2002	2002	Stanislas Guerini	En Marche!
Socialist	Seybah Dagoma	Paris's 5th constituency	2012	1997	Benjamin Griveaux	En Marche!
Socialist	Patrick Bloche	Paris's 7th constituency	1997	1997	Pacôme Rupin	En Marche!
Socialist	Sandrine Mazetier	Paris's 8th constituency	2007	2007	Laetitia Avia	En Marche!
Socialist	Pascal Cherki	Paris's 11th constituency	2012	2012	Marielle de Sarnez	Democratic Movement
Socialist	Jean-Christophe Cambadélis	Paris's 16th constituency	2012	2012	Mounir Mahjoubi	En Marche!
Socialist	Valérie Fourneyron	Seine-Maritime's 1st constituency	2012	2012	Damien Adam	En Marche!
Socialist	Luce Pane	Seine-Maritime's 3rd constituency	2012	1997	Hubert Wulfranc	Communist
Socialist	Guillaume Bachelay	Seine-Maritime's 4th constituency	2012	1981	Sira Sylla	En Marche!
Socialist	Marie Le Vern	Seine-Maritime's 6th constituency	2015	2012	Sébastien Jumel	Communist
Socialist	Catherine Troallic	Seine-Maritime's 8th constituency	2012	2012	Jean-Paul Lecoq	Communist
Socialist	Estelle Grelier	Seine-Maritime's 9th constituency	2012	2012	Stéphanie Kerbarh	En Marche!
Socialist	Dominique Chauvel	Seine-Maritime's 10th constituency	2012	2012	Xavier Batut	En Marche!
Socialist	Eduardo Rihan Cypel	Seine-et-Marne's 8th constituency	2012	2012	Jean-Michel Fauvergue	En Marche!
Socialist	Françoise Descamps-Crosnier	Yvelines's 8th constituency	2012	2012	Michel Vialay	Republican
Socialist	Benoît Hamon	Yvelines's 11th constituency	2012	2012	Nadia Hai	En Marche!
Socialist	Pascale Boistard	Somme's 1st constituency	2012	2012	François Ruffin	Picardie debout
Socialist	Jean-Claude Buisine	Somme's 3rd constituency	2012	2012	Emmanuel Maquet	Republican
Socialist	Linda Gourjade	Tarn's 3rd constituency	2012	2012	Jean Terlier	En Marche!
Socialist	Sylviane Bulteau	Vendée's 2nd constituency	2012	2012	Patricia Gallerneau	Democratic Movement
Socialist	Hugues Fourage	Vendée's 5th constituency	2012	2012	Pierre Henriet	En Marche!
Socialist	Catherine Beaubatie	Haute-Vienne's 3rd constituency	2012	1997	Marie-Ange Magne	En Marche!
Socialist	Christian Franqueville	Vosges's 4th constituency	2012	2012	Jean-Jacques Gaultier	Republican
Socialist	Jean-Yves Caullet	Yonne's 2nd constituency	2012	2012	André Villiers	Union of Democrats and Independents
Socialist	Michel Pouzol	Essonne's 3rd constituency	2012	2012	Laëtitia Romeiro Dias	En Marche!
Socialist	Maud Olivier	Essonne's 5th constituency	2012	2012	Cédric Villani	En Marche!
Socialist	Romain Colas	Essonne's 9th constituency	2014	2012	Marie Guévenoux	En Marche!
Socialist	Malek Boutih	Essonne's 10th constituency	2012	1988	Pierre-Alain Raphan	En Marche!
Socialist	Alexis Bachelay	Hauts-de-Seine's 1st constituency	2012	2012	Elsa Faucillon	Communist
Socialist	Julie Sommaruga	Hauts-de-Seine's 11th constituency	2012	2012	Laurianne Rossi	En Marche!
Socialist	Jean-Marc Germain	Hauts-de-Seine's 12th constituency	2012	2012	Jean-Louis Bourlanges	Democratic Movement
Socialist	Mathieu Hanotin	Seine-Saint-Denis's 2nd constituency	2012	2012	Stéphane Peu	Democratic Movement
Socialist	Élisabeth Guigou	Seine-Saint-Denis's 6th constituency	2012	1981	Bastien Lachaud	Democratic Movement
Socialist	Razzy Hammadi	Seine-Saint-Denis's 7th constituency	2012	2012	Alexis Corbière	Democratic Movement
Socialist	Élisabeth Pochon	Seine-Saint-Denis's 8th constituency	2012	2012	Sylvie Charrière	En Marche!
Socialist	Daniel Goldberg	Seine-Saint-Denis's 10th constituency	2012	2012	Alain Ramadier	Republican
Socialist	Philippe Doucet	Val-d'Oise's 5th constituency	2012	2012	Fiona Lazaar	En Marche!
Socialist	Dominique Lefebvre	Val-d'Oise's 10th constituency	2012	2012	Aurélien Taché	En Marche!
Socialist	Jean-Jacques Vlody	Réunion's 3rd constituency	2012	2012	Nathalie Bassire	En Marche!
Socialist	Monique Orphé	Réunion's 6th constituency	2012	2012	Nadia Ramassamy	Republican
Socialist	Ibrahim Aboubacar	Mayotte's 2nd constituency	2012	2012	Mansour Kamardine	Republican
Socialist	Axelle Lemaire	Third constituency for French residents overseas	2012	2012	Alexandre Holroyd	En Marche!
Socialist	Philip Cordery	Fourth constituency for French residents overseas	2012	2012	Pieyre-Alexandre Anglade	En Marche!
Socialist	Jérôme Guedj	Essonne's 6th constituency	2012	1997	Amélie De Montchalin	En Marche!
Republican	Stéphanie Pernod-Beaudon	Ain's 3rd constituency	2016	1988	Olga Givernet	En Marche!
Republican	Nicolas Dhuicq	Aube's 1st constituency	2007	1978	Grégory Besson-Moreau	En Marche!
Republican	Yves Censi	Aveyron's 1st constituency	2002	1958	Stéphane Mazars	En Marche!
Republican	Dominique Tian	Bouches-du-Rhône's 2nd constituency	2002	1993	Claire Pitollat	En Marche!
Republican	Christian Kert	Bouches-du-Rhône's 11th constituency	2002	2002	Mohamed Laqhila	Democratic Movement
Republican	Nicole Ameline	Calvados's 4th constituency	1993	1988	Christophe Blanchet	En Marche!
Republican	Camille de Rocca Serra	Corse-du-Sud's 2nd constituency	2002	1978	Paul-André Colombani	For Corsica
Republican	Sauveur Gandolfi-Scheit	Haute-Corse's 1st constituency	2007	2007	Michel Castellani	For Corsica
Republican	Laurence Arribagé	Haute-Garonne's 3rd constituency	2014	2012	Corinne Vignon	En Marche!
Republican	Yves Foulon	Gironde's 8th constituency	2012	2012	Sophie Panonacle	En Marche!
Republican	Élie Aboud	Hérault's 6th constituency	2012	2012	Emmanuelle Ménard	National Rally
Republican	Isabelle Le Callennec	Ille-et-Vilaine's 5th constituency	2012	1958	Christine Cloarec	En Marche!
Republican	Daniel Labaronne	Indre-et-Loire's 2nd constituency	2002	2002	Daniel Labaronne	En Marche!
Republican	Alain Moyne-Bressand	Isère's 6th constituency	1988	1988	Cendra Motin	En Marche!
Republican	Pascal Clément	Loire's 6th constituency	1988	1988	Julien Borowczyk	En Marche!
Republican	Serge Grouard	Loiret's 2nd constituency	2002	1988	Caroline Janvier	En Marche!
Republican	Jean-Louis Costes	Lot-et-Garonne's 3rd constituency	2013	2012	Olivier Damaisin	En Marche!
Republican	Guénhaël Huet	Manche's 2nd constituency	2007	1988	Bertrand Sorre	En Marche!
Republican	Catherine Vautrin	Marne's 2nd constituency	2002	1993	Aina Kuric	En Marche!
Republican	Guillaume Chevrollier	Mayenne's 2nd constituency	2012	1988	Géraldine Bannier	Democratic Movement
Republican	Marie-Jo Zimmermann	Moselle's 3rd constituency	2002	1988	Richard Lioger	En Marche!
Republican	Céleste Lett	Moselle's 5th constituency	2002	2002	Nicole Gries-Trisse	En Marche!
Republican	Thierry Lazaro	Nord's 6th constituency	1993	1993	Charlotte Lecocq	En Marche!
Republican	Bernard Gérard	Nord's 9th constituency	2007	1958	Valérie Petit	En Marche!
Republican	Fernand Siré	Pyrénées-Orientales's 2nd constituency	2012	2002	Louis Aliot	National Rally
Republican	Sophie Rohfritsch	Bas-Rhin's 4th constituency	2007	1958	Martine Wonner	En Marche!
Republican	Dominique Nachury	Rhône's 4th constituency	2012	1988	Anne Brugnera	En Marche!
Republican	Philippe Cochet	Rhône's 5th constituency	2002	1988	Blandine Brocard	En Marche!
Republican	Georges Fenech	Rhône's 11th constituency	2012	2002	Jean-Luc Fugit	En Marche!
Republican	Philippe Meunier	Rhône's 13th constituency	2007	2007	Danièle Cazarian	En Marche!
Republican	Dominique Dord	Savoie's 1st constituency	1997	1993	Typhanie Degois	En Marche!
Republican	Lionel Tardy	Haute-Savoie's 2nd constituency	2007	1988	Frédérique Lardet	En Marche!
Republican	Sophie Dion	Haute-Savoie's 6th constituency	2012	2012	Xavier Roseren	En Marche!
Republican	Philippe Goujon	Paris's 12th constituency	2007	1958	Olivia Grégoire	En Marche!
Republican	Jean-François Lamour	Paris's 13th constituency	2007	1988	Hugues Renson	En Marche!
Republican	Françoise Guégot	Seine-Maritime's 2nd constituency	2007	1993	Annie Vidal	En Marche!
Republican	Yves Albarello	Seine-et-Marne's 7th constituency	2007	1993	Rodrigue Kokouendo	En Marche!
Republican	Guy Geoffroy	Seine-et-Marne's 9th constituency	2002	2002	Michèle Peyron	En Marche!
Republican	Pascal Thévenot	Yvelines's 2nd constituency	2016	1988	Jean-Noël Barrot	Democratic Movement
Republican	Jacques Myard	Yvelines's 5th constituency	1993	1988	Yaël Braun-Pivet	En Marche!
Republican	Pierre Morange	Yvelines's 6th constituency	1999	1988	Natalia Pouzyreff	En Marche!
Republican	Jean-Marie Tétart	Yvelines's 9th constituency	2012	1988	Bruno Millienne	Democratic Movement
Republican	Jean-Frédéric Poisson (As PCD)	Yvelines's 10th constituency	2012	2012	Aurore Bergé	En Marche!
Republican	David Douillet	Yvelines's 12th constituency	2012	1988	Florence Granjus	En Marche!
Republican	Philippe Vitel	Var's 2nd constituency	2002	2002	Cécile Muschotti	En Marche!
Republican	Jean-Sébastien Vialatte	Var's 7th constituency	2002	1988	Émilie Guerel	En Marche!
Republican	Olivier Audibert-Troin	Var's 8th constituency	2012	2012	Fabien Matras	En Marche!
Republican	Alain Lebœuf	Vendée's 1st constituency	2012	1988	Philippe Latombe	Democratic Movement
Republican	Axel Poniatowski	Val-d'Oise's 2nd constituency	2002	2002	Guillaume Vuilletet	En Marche!
Republican	Jérôme Chartier	Val-d'Oise's 7th constituency	2002	2002	Dominique Da Silva	En Marche!
Republican	Frédéric Lefebvre	First constituency for French residents overseas	2013	2013	Roland Lescure	En Marche!
Republican	Claudine Schmid	Sixth constituency for French residents overseas	2012	2012	Joachim Son-Forget	En Marche!
Republican	Alain Marsaud	Tenth constituency for French residents overseas	2012	2012	Amal Amélia Lakrafi	En Marche!
Republican	Thierry Mariani	Eleventh constituency for French residents overseas	2012	2012	Anne Genetet	En Marche!
Union of Democrats and Independents	Rudy Salles	Alpes-Maritimes's 3rd constituency	1988	1988	Cédric Roussel	En Marche!
Union of Democrats and Independents	Franck Reynier (elected as UPM)	Drôme's 2nd constituency	2007	2002	Alice Thourot	En Marche!
Union of Democrats and Independents	François Rochebloine	Loire's 3rd constituency	1988	1988	Valéria Faure-Muntian	En Marche!
Union of Democrats and Independents	Francis Hillmeyer	Haut-Rhin's 6th constituency	2000	1988	Bruno Fuchs	En Marche!
Union of Democrats and Independents	Arnaud Richard (elected as UPM)	Yvelines's 7th constituency	2010	1993	Michèle de Vaucouleurs	Democratic Movement
Miscellaneous left	Marie-Françoise Bechtel(elected as MRC)	Aisne's 4th constituency	2012	1997	Marc Delatte	En Marche!
Miscellaneous left	Isabelle Attard (elected as EELV)	Calvados's 5th constituency	2012	2012	Bertrand Bouyx	En Marche!
Miscellaneous left	Kheira Bouziane-Laroussi (elected as PS)	Côte-d'Or's 3rd constituency	2012	1997	Fadila Khattabi	En Marche!
Miscellaneous left	Jean-Luc Bleunven	Finistère's 3rd constituency	2012	2012	Didier Le Gac	En Marche!
Miscellaneous left	Anne-Yvonne Le Dain (elected as PS)	Hérault's 2nd constituency	2012	2007	Muriel Ressiguier	La France Insoumise
Miscellaneous left	Monique Rabin (elected as PS)	Loire-Atlantique's 9th constituency	2012	2012	Yannick Haury	En Marche!
Miscellaneous left	Serge Bardy	Maine-et-Loire's 6th constituency	2012	2012	Nicole Dubré-Chirat	En Marche!
Miscellaneous left	Philippe Noguès (elected as PS)	Morbihan's 6th constituency	2012	2012	Jean-Michel Jacques	En Marche!
Miscellaneous left	Christian Bataille (elected as PS)	Nord's 12th constituency	2012	1988	Anne-Laure Cattelot	En Marche!
Miscellaneous left	Michel Françaix (elected as PS)	Oise's 3rd constituency	1997	1997	Pascal Bois	En Marche!
Miscellaneous left	Jean-Luc Laurent (elected as MRC)	Val-de-Marne's 10th constituency	2012	2012	Mathilde Panot	La France Insoumise
Miscellaneous left	Chantal Berthelot	French Guiana's 2nd constituency	2007	2007	Lénaïck Adam	En Marche!
Miscellaneous left	Boinali Saïd	Mayotte's 1st constituency	2012	2012	Ramlati Ali	Socialist
Communist	Nicolas Sansu	Cher's 2nd constituency	2012	1997	Nadia Essayan	Democratic Movement
Communist	Patrice Carvalho (elected as FG)	Oise's 6th constituency	2012	2012	Carole Bureau-Bonnard	En Marche!
Europe Ecology – The Greens	Brigitte Allain	Dordogne's 2nd constituency	2012	2012	Michel Delpon	En Marche!
Europe Ecology – The Greens	Christophe Cavard	Gard's 6th constituency	2012	2012	Philippe Berta	En Marche!
Europe Ecology – The Greens	Jean-Louis Roumégas	Hérault's 1st constituency	2012	2012	Patricia Mirallès	En Marche!
Europe Ecology – The Greens	Cécile Duflot	Paris's 6th constituency	2012	2012	Pierre Person	En Marche!
Europe Ecology – The Greens	Véronique Massonneau	Vienne's 4th constituency	2012	2012	Nicolas Turquois	Democratic Movement
Europe Ecology – The Greens	Éva Sas	Essonne's 7th constituency	2012	2012	Robin Reda	Republican
Europe Ecology – The Greens	Laurence Abeille	Val-de-Marne's 6th constituency	2012	2012	Guillaume Gouffier-Cha	En Marche!
Europe Ecology – The Greens	Sergio Coronado	Second constituency for French residents overseas	2012	2012	Paula Forteza	En Marche!
Radical Party of the Left	Dominique Orliac	Lot's 1st constituency	2007	2007	Aurélien Pradié	Republican
Radical Party of the Left	Stéphane Saint-André	Pas-de-Calais's 9th constituency	2012	2012	Marguerite Deprez-Audebert	Democratic Movement

== See also ==
- List of MPs who lost their seat in the 2022 French legislative election
