= Françoise Dubois =

French politician

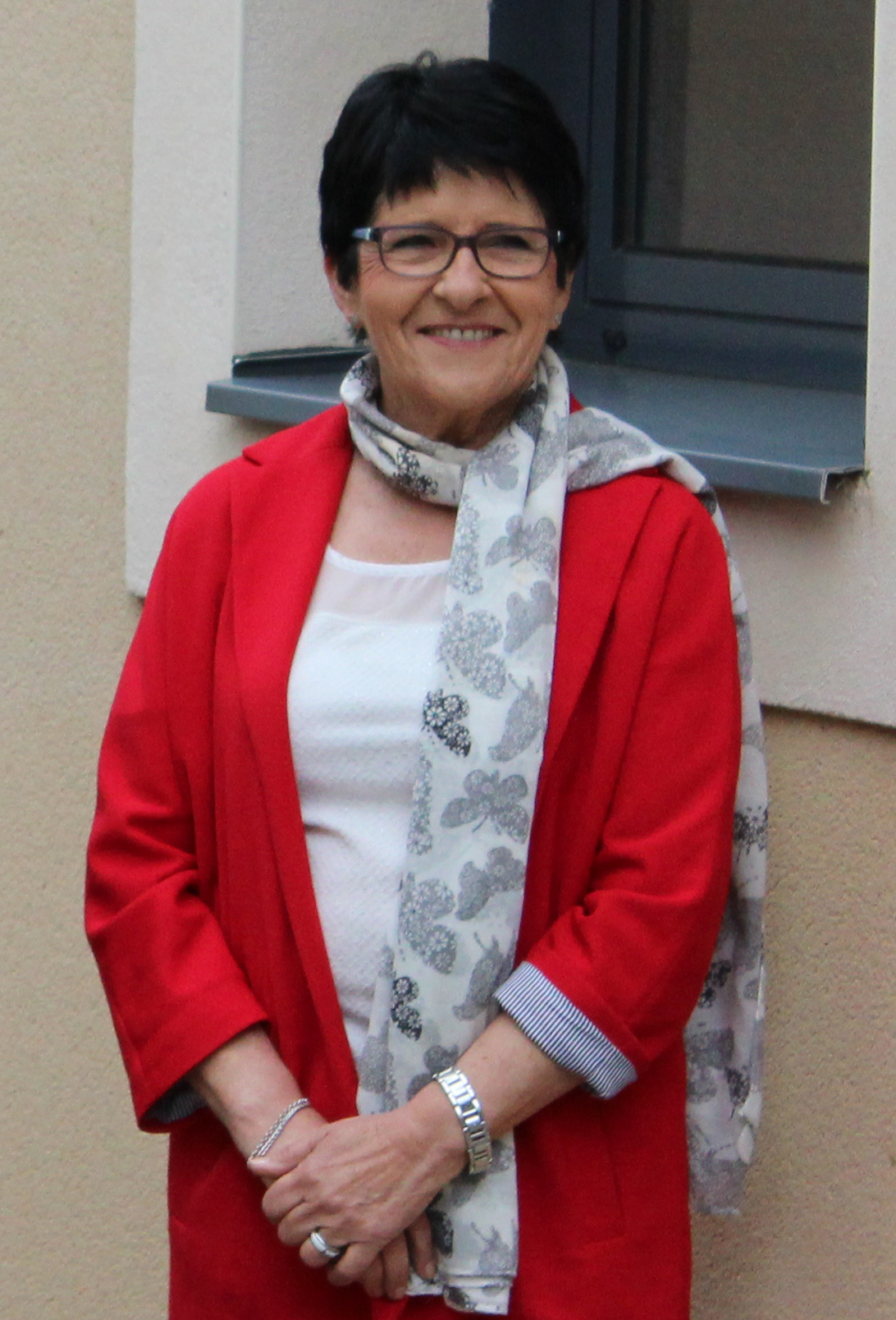
Françoise Dubois in 2017.

Françoise Dubois (born 6 December 1947) is a French Socialist politician who was Member of Parliament for Sarthe's 1st constituency from 2012 until 2017 when she was decisively defeated, losing her seat to Damien Pichereau from En Marche.

== Early life ==
Dubois was born in Coulans-sur-Gée. She worked as a schoolteacher.

== Political career ==
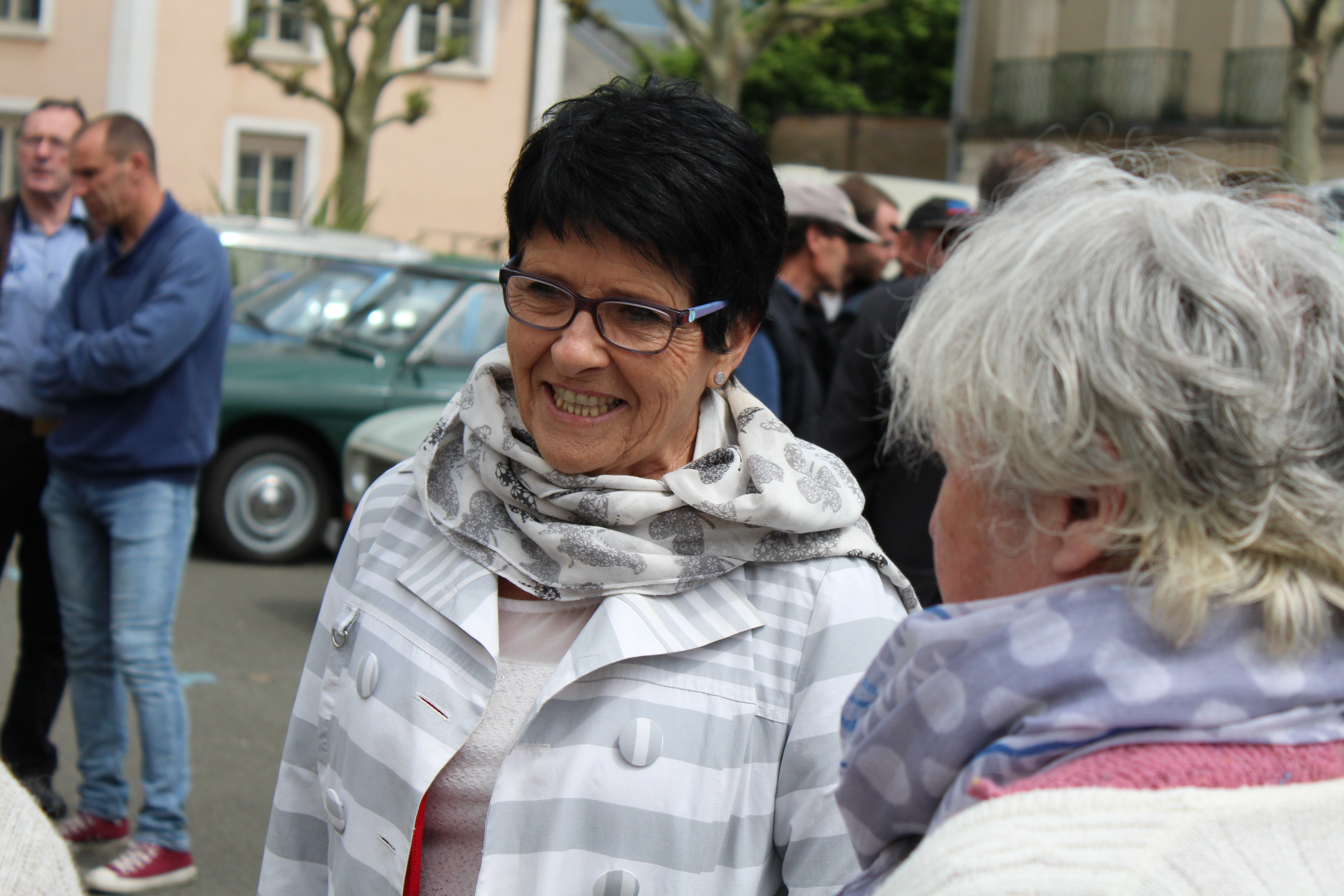
Françoise Dubois during a trip to Sillé-le-Guillaume.

In the 2012 French legislative election, she defeated incumbent Union for a Popular Movement MP Fabienne Labrette-Ménager.

In the 14th legislature of the French Fifth Republic, she was member of the Sustainable Development, Spatial and Regional Planning Committee and of the Commission of Inquiry into the conditions for slaughtering slaughter animals in French slaughterhouses, she attended all of the meetings (317 committee attendances ) and occurred 122 times during these. She wrote with Jean-Pierre Vigier a report on aquatic ecological continuities.

She lost her seat to Damien Pichereau from En Marche in the 2017 parliamentary election, only receiving 12% of the votes in the first round.
