= Results of the 2024 French legislative election in Vienne =

Legislative election results in 2024

Following the first round of the 2024 French legislative election on 30 June 2024, runoff elections in each constituency where no candidate received a vote share greater than 50 percent were scheduled for 7 July. Candidates permitted to stand in the runoff elections needed to either come in first or second place in the first round or achieve more than 12.5 percent of the votes of the entire electorate (as opposed to 12.5 percent of the vote share due to low turnout).

== Vienne ==
=== 1st constituency ===
Candidate	Party or alliance		First round		Second round	
Candidate	Party or alliance		Votes	%	Votes	%
Lisa Belluco	New Popular Front	The Ecologists	18,232	33.14	22,660	40.64
Emmanuelle Darles	National Rally		15,918	28.93	16,858	30.23
Séverine Saint-Pé	Ensemble	Horizons	15,875	28.85	16,244	29.13
Aurélien Tricot	Miscellaneous left	Independent	4,399	7.99		
Ludovic Gaillard	Far-left	Lutte Ouvrière	599	1.09		
Total			55,023	100.00	55,762	100.00
Valid votes			55,023	97.14	55,762	97.45
Invalid votes			577	1.02	409	0.71
Blank votes			1,045	1.84	1,052	1.84
Total votes			56,645	100.00	57,223	100.00
Registered voters/turnout			81,053	69.89	81,069	70.59

=== 2nd constituency ===
Candidate	Party or alliance		First round		Second round	
Candidate	Party or alliance		Votes	%	Votes	%
Sacha Houlie	Ensemble	Renaissance	18,855	33.21	23,895	41.90
Valérie Soumaille	New Popular Front	La France Insoumise	16,254	28.63	18,666	32.73
Estelle Chevallier	National Rally		13,864	24.42	14,473	25.38
Aurélien Bourdier	Miscellaneous left	Independent	5,723	10.08		
Xavier Augay	Miscellaneous right	Independent	1,658	2.92		
Agnès Chauvin	Far-left	Lutte Ouvrière	413	0.73		
Total			56,767	100.00	57,034	100.00
Valid votes			56,767	97.57	57,034	97.43
Invalid votes			516	0.89	430	0.73
Blank votes			896	1.54	1,076	1.84
Total votes			58,179	100.00	58,540	100.00
Registered voters/turnout			80,207	72.54	80,219	72.98

=== 3rd constituency ===
Candidate	Party or alliance		First round		Second round	
Candidate	Party or alliance		Votes	%	Votes	%
Eric Soulat	National Rally		19,887	40.82	21,868	45.59
Pascal Lecamp	Ensemble	Democratic Movement	14,704	30.18	26,100	54.41
Gisèle Jean	New Popular Front	Miscellaneous left	13,020	26.73		
Soizic Jouan	Far-left	Lutte Ouvrière	688	1.41		
Tatiana Gouverneur	Ecologists	Independent	417	0.86		
Total			48,716	100.00	47,968	100.00
Valid votes			48,716	96.15	47,968	94.23
Invalid votes			767	1.51	876	1.72
Blank votes			1,182	2.33	2,060	4.05
Total votes			50,665	100.00	50,904	100.00
Registered voters/turnout			72,419	69.96	72,430	70.28

=== 4th constituency ===
Candidate	Party or alliance		First round		Second round	
Candidate	Party or alliance		Votes	%	Votes	%
Hager Jacquemin	National Rally		19,268	41.04	21,468	46.05
Nicolas Turquois	Ensemble	Democratic Movement	15,076	32.11	25,152	53.95
Yves Trousselle	New Popular Front	Miscellaneous left	9,901	21.09		
Patrick Minot	Miscellaneous centre	Independent	1,263	2.69		
Sabine Bortolotti	Sovereigntist right	Debout la France	752	1.60		
Patrice Villeret	Far-left	Lutte Ouvrière	691	1.47		
Total			46,951	100.00	46,620	100.00
Valid votes			46,951	96.73	46,620	95.39
Invalid votes			640	1.32	708	1.45
Blank votes			945	1.95	1,543	3.16
Total votes			48,536	100.00	48,871	100.00
Registered voters/turnout			73,679	65.87	73,685	66.32
