= Abelin =

Abelin is a surname, and may refer to:

- Jean-Pierre Abelin (born 1950), French politician
- Johann Philipp Abelin (died 1634), German historian
- Ernst Abelin (born 1933), Swiss psychoanalyst and founder of the theory of early triangulation
- Isaak Abelin (1883−1965), Swiss physiologist
- Ludvig Abelin Schou (1838–1867), Danish painter
- Pierre Abelin (1909–1977), French politician, parliamentarian and government minister
