= Bruno Fuchs =

Bruno Fuchs may refer to:

- Bruno Fuchs (politician)
- Bruno Fuchs (footballer)
