= Fabienne Labrette-Ménager =

French politician

Fabienne Labrette-Ménager (born 8 January 1961) was a member of the National Assembly of France. She represented Sarthe's 1st constituency from 2007 to 2012, as a member of the Union for a Popular Movement.

== Biography ==
She made her entry into politics in 2001 while jointly becoming adjunct to the mayor of Fresnay-sur-Sarthe and counselor-general for the canton of Fresnay-sur-Sarthe.

At the time of the regional elections in 2004, she appeared on the list of UDF-UMP led by François Fillon. Although this list was beaten in the 2nd round, she was elected to the district council of the Pays de la Loire. At that time, she relinquished her appointment as counselor for Fresnay-sur-Sarthe.

Fabienne Labrette-Domestic was elected deputy on 17 June 2007 for the XIIIe legislature (2007–2012), in the 1st district of the Sarthe by defeating, in the second round, Françoise Dubois (PS) with 56.55% of the vote. She thereby succeeded Pierre Hellier (UMP) who did not seek re-election. She was a member of the commissions for economic affairs, for the environment and for the region.
