= Louis Cosyns =

French politician

Mayor of Dun-sur-Auron
- Incumbent
- Assumed office 23 June 1995
- Preceded by: Berthe Fiévet

Member of the National Assembly for Cher's 3rd constituency
- In office 19 June 2002 – 19 June 2012
- Preceded by: Yann Galut
- Succeeded by: Yann Galut

Personal details
- Born: 29 September 1952 (age 72); Saint-Amand-Montrond, France
- Political party: UMP; The Republicans

Louis Cosyns (born 29 September 1952 in Saint-Amand-Montrond) was a member of the National Assembly of France. He represented Cher's 3rd constituency from 2002 to 2012, as a member of the Union for a Popular Movement.

On 26 May 2017, while running for the 3rd constituency of Cher, he collided with a motorist in Blet, killing her instantly. He then withdrew from the campaign, declaring that he only wanted to devote himself to his mandate as mayor of Dun-sur-Auron.
