= Michel Castellani =

French politician (born 1945)

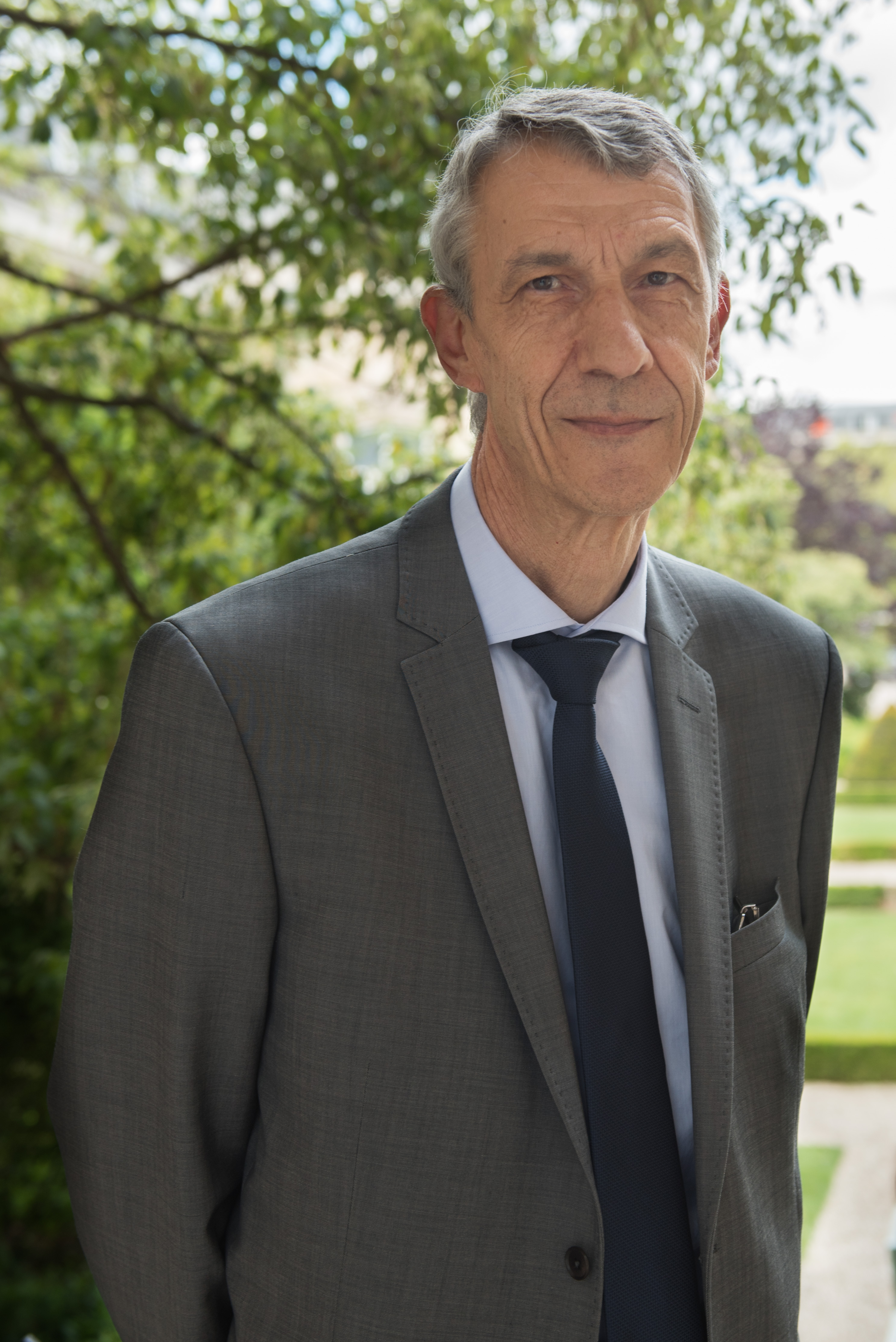
- Michel Castellani in 2017

Member of the National Assembly for Haute-Corse's 1st constituency
- Incumbent
- Assumed office 21 June 2017
- Preceded by: Sauveur Gandolfi-Scheit

Personal details
- Born: 28 September 1945 (age 80) Bastia, Corsica
- Party: Femu a Corsica
- Education: University of Corsica Pasquale Paoli

Michel Castellani (born 28 September 1945) is a French politician who serves in the National Assembly representing Haute-Corse's 1st constituency since 2017. A supporter of Corsican autonomy, he is a member of Femu a Corsica political party and Liberties, Independents, Overseas and Territories group in the National Assembly. Prior to his tenure in the National Assembly he was a member of the Corsican Assembly and active in the local politics of Bastia.

== Early life ==
Michel Castellani was born in Bastia, Corsica, France, on 28 September 1945. He was an economics professor at the University of Corsica Pasquale Paoli.

== Career ==
In 2014, Castellani became the deputy mayor of Bastia. He later became a member of the Corsican Assembly.

As a member of Femu a Corsica and supported by the Régions et Peuples Solidaires alliance, Castellani defeated Sauveur Gandolfi-Scheit, the nominee of The Republicans, in the 2017 election for a seat in the National Assembly representing Haute-Corse's 1st constituency. He was reelected in the 2022 and 2024 elections.

During Castellani's tenure in the National Assembly he served on the Finance and Immigration committees. He is a member of the Liberties, Independents, Overseas and Territories group.

== Political positions ==
Corsican autonomy and decentralization is supported by Castellani. Castellani opposed a 20% value-added tax on wine. He opposed placing children into immigration detention centres. During the 2022 to 2024 legislative session, he unsuccessfully sought the construction of a Sécurité Civile base in Bastia.

== Works cited ==
=== News ===
- "Michel Castellani, ce professeur d'économie devenu député nationaliste de Haute-Corse". France 3 Via Stella. 18 June 2017. Archived from the original on 18 June 2025.
- Mari, Nicole (23 June 2024). "Législatives. Michel Castellani: Je ne fais pas de promesse, je présente un bilan". Corse Net Infos. Archived from the original on 18 June 2025.
- Mari, Nicole (17 June 2022). "Michel Castellani: J'appelle les citoyens à se mobiliser et à conforter la démarche qui est la nôtre depuis sept ans". Corse Net Infos. Archived from the original on 18 June 2025.
- Perelli, Manon (27 July 2023). "Michel Castellani: "Nous sommes face à un Gouvernement qui est quand même sur la réserve". Corse Net Infos. Archived from the original on 18 June 2025.

=== Web ===
- "Haute-Corse's 1st constituency 2017 election results". Minister of the Interior.
- "Haute-Corse's 1st constituency 2022 election results". Minister of the Interior.
- "Haute-Corse's 1st constituency 2024 election results". Minister of the Interior.
- "M. Michel Castellani". National Assembly. Archived from the original on 18 June 2025.
