= Rape of Alexandre Robert =

2007 gang rape case that occurred in Dubai

The Alexandre Robert case concerns an incident of gang rape of a minor that occurred in 2007 in Dubai, United Arab Emirates.

This case was widely publicized in France and around the world and had consequences for diplomatic relations between France and the United Arab Emirates.

== Incident ==
On 14 July 2007, Alexandre Robert, a 15-year-old French boy living in Dubai, was returning from the beach with his 16-year-old French friend and, unable to find a taxi, they decided to accept an offer of a ride from an acquaintance, a teenaged Emirati boy who they did not know well. This acquaintance called two of his friends, men aged 18 and 36, who came to pick them up by car. Alexandre and his friend entered the vehicle with the three Emiratis, but the car was then driven past the exit where he lived. When Robert enquired about where they were going, the men locked the doors of the car. They then drove the two friends towards open desert in the outskirts of the city. Robert called the police emergency phone number using his cellphone and began screaming for help, but the Emirati teen overheard the call and beat him and took away his cellphone and threatened to kill his family if he reported them. Alexandre's friend was then forcibly removed from the car, beaten, and forced to go behind a sand dune where he could not see what was happening when the three Emiratis threatened Robert with a pool stick and a hunting knife and proceeded to gang-rape him.

When the assailants tried to drive the car away after the rape, it became stuck in the sand. They telephoned a relative for help, and a 4×4 vehicle arrived quickly. Robert managed to memorize the license plate of the 4×4, which later led to the arrest of the perpetrators.

Robert and his friend were then brought back to Dubai. During the ride back to the city, Alexandre and his friend were repeatedly threatened that they would be raped again and killed if they tried to report them to the police. They were then hastily thrown out of the car in front of a luxury hotel.

== Controversies ==
=== Minimization of the case by the Dubai authorities ===
This case shed light on part of the judicial system of the United Arab Emirates, particularly on the treatment reserved for rape cases and on the taboo of homosexuality in the country. According to Robert's father, they were received in a rather hostile way by the police who would have done everything to dissuade them from filing a complaint.

At the time of the medical examination, the doctor at the police station pressured Robert to say that he was homosexual and that the incident was not in fact a rape, but instead was a consensual homosexual relationship between him and the three men.

Dubai considers homosexuality a crime, with consensual sodomy punishable by up to 10 years in prison in Dubai. The concept of raping a man is also not widely recognised, with Dubai even preferring to talk about "forced homosexuality" rather than rape in these situations.

Alexandre's mother, Véronique Robert, was quickly made aware of the events. As a journalist, she used her networks and knowledge to ensure that her son's rape was not swept under the carpet by Emirati authorities. She hired a French-speaking Emirati lawyer and had her son undergo a series of medical tests, ensuring that the complaint was taken seriously. She also enlisted the help of the French authorities, in particular the French Consulate in Dubai. Véronique Robert then contacted the French government directly via the Quai d'Orsay and the Secretary General of the Élysée Palace, Claude Guéant. During a meeting at the Élysée Palace in July 2007, French President Nicolas Sarkozy even asked his Emirati counterpart to give "the greatest attention" to the case.

Following the mobilisation of Alexandre's mother, their lawyer contacted the Dubai police so that they could take the young man's statement again, this time more seriously, as it previously had not even been recorded. As a result of this new statement and the number plate that Robert provided them with, the police were able to arrest two of the rapists.

=== Concealment of blood results ===
The Dubai authorities initially announced to Alexander's family that blood tests carried out on the three rapists had provided negative results and that they were therefore not carriers of HIV or other sexually transmitted diseases. Shortly thereafter, contradictory information arrived and the family began to doubt the information and requested new medical tests. Once again they were told that the new tests were negative. It was later learned that the 32-year-old assailant had been carrying HIV for several years and that he was well known to the Emirati authorities, who had even recommended that the man be locked up in a separate room when he was incarcerated. The Emirati authorities are said to have sought to hide this HIV case, as the subject, like that of homosexuality, is very taboo in the country, which seeks to deny the existence of "the virus" on its territory.

Faced with this obvious concealment of information, Véronique Robert accused the Dubai authorities of having lied and endangered her son's life because during this time they had not been able to start using post-exposure preventive therapy. She filed a complaint against the Attorney General, the two chiefs of police, the Sheikh of Dubai and Abu Dhabi for endangering her son's life.

== Trial ==
In the first trial, two of the three rapists in the car were tried, the 18-year-old man and the 36-year-old man. They were accused of "kidnapping with deception" and "forced homosexuality", the latter charge being punishable by life imprisonment or the death penalty in Dubai.

The defendants pleaded not guilty and claimed that Robert had consented during the events. Their lawyers accused Robert of being homosexual, as homosexuality is a crime in Dubai. The Emirati teen who had allegedly offered him a ride, forced him into the car, beat him when he called the police, and participated in the gang rape was expected to later be judged by a court for minors on the same charges as the men, and reportedly could receive a sentence up to 10 years of imprisonment, but the name of the teen and the status of the case was not disclosed.

Ultimately, the two adult men were sentenced to 15 years in prison each. Their names were not publicly disclosed, nor was it revealed what specific crimes they were convicted of. Although Alexandre and his family were pleased that the men were convicted and that the crime did not go unpunished, they did not consider the sentence to be severe enough. In their opinion, the fact that the 36-year-old man had hidden his HIV status was an aggravating factor that should have resulted in a harsher sentence.
