= Véronique Robert =

- Born: Morges, Switzerland
- Died: 24 June 2017 (aged 54); Clamart, France
- Cause of death: Land mine explosion
- Occupation: Journalist
- Spouse: Bruno Fuchs

Véronique Robert (1962 – 24 June 2017) was a Franco-Swiss journalist and war correspondent, who died in a Paris hospital on 24 June 2017, at age 54, after being wounded in an explosion in Mosul, Iraq, five days earlier, on 19 June.

Robert was wounded in the same mine explosion that killed Iraqi journalist Bakhtiyar Haddad and fellow French journalist Stéphan Villeneuve, and wounded Samuel Foley, who works for Le Figaro. Robert and Villeneuve were working for France Télévisions on a report for the French TV documentary show Envoyé spécial.

On 29 June 2017, it was announced that she would be made a Chevalier of the Legion of Honour.

In 2007, one of her sons was raped in Dubai, prompting her to launch a campaign against the authorities.
