= Natalia Pouzyreff =

French politician (born 1961)

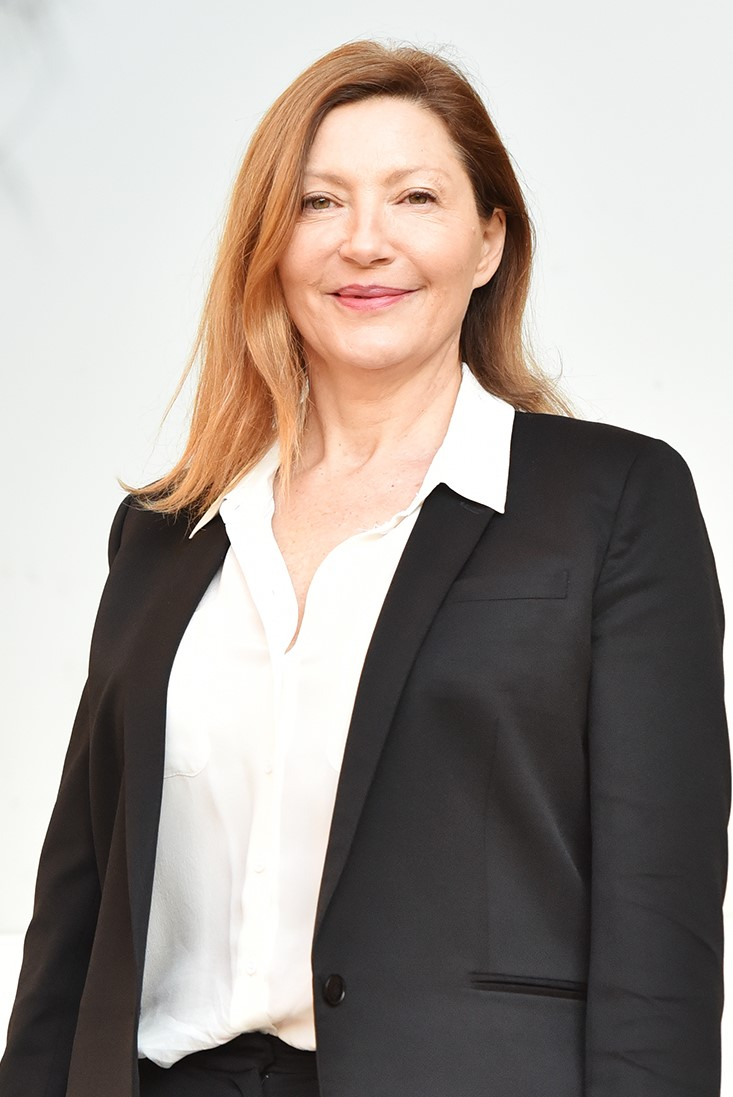

Member of the National Assembly for Yvelines's 6th constituency
- Incumbent
- Assumed office 21 June 2017
- Preceded by: Pierre Morange

Personal details
- Born: 18 February 1961 (age 65) Limoges, France
- Party: La République En Marche!
- Education: Institut d'Optique Graduate School

Natalia Pouzyreff (born 18 February 1961) is a French engineer and politician of La République En Marche! (LREM) who has been serving as a member of the French National Assembly since 2017, representing the department of Yvelines.

== Early career ==
An engineering graduate of the École supérieure d'optique (class of 1986), Pouzyreff worked for over 25 years in the aerospace and defense industry, first at Thales Group for 17 years, then at Airbus for 8 years. A part of her professional career has been spent abroad; she lived in Beijing from 2006 to 2009 as Eurocopter's General Delegate in China. She was subsequently appointed Foreign Trade Advisor for France from 2007 to 2014.

== Political career ==
Pouzyreff joined LREM in 2016. In parliament, Pouzyreff serves on the Defense Committee.

In addition to her committee assignments, Pouzyreff has been a member of the French delegation to the Franco-German Parliamentary Assembly since 2022. She is also a member of the French-Chinese Parliamentary Friendship Group and the French-British Parliamentary Friendship Group.

In late 2019, Pouzyreff was one of 17 members of the committee who co-signed a letter to Prime Minister Édouard Philippe in which they warned that the 365 million euro ($406 million) sale of aerospace firm Groupe Latécoère to U.S. fund Searchlight Capital raised “questions about the preservation of know-how and France’s defense industry base” and urged government intervention.

== See also ==
- 2017 French legislative election
