= Philippe Berta =

French politician

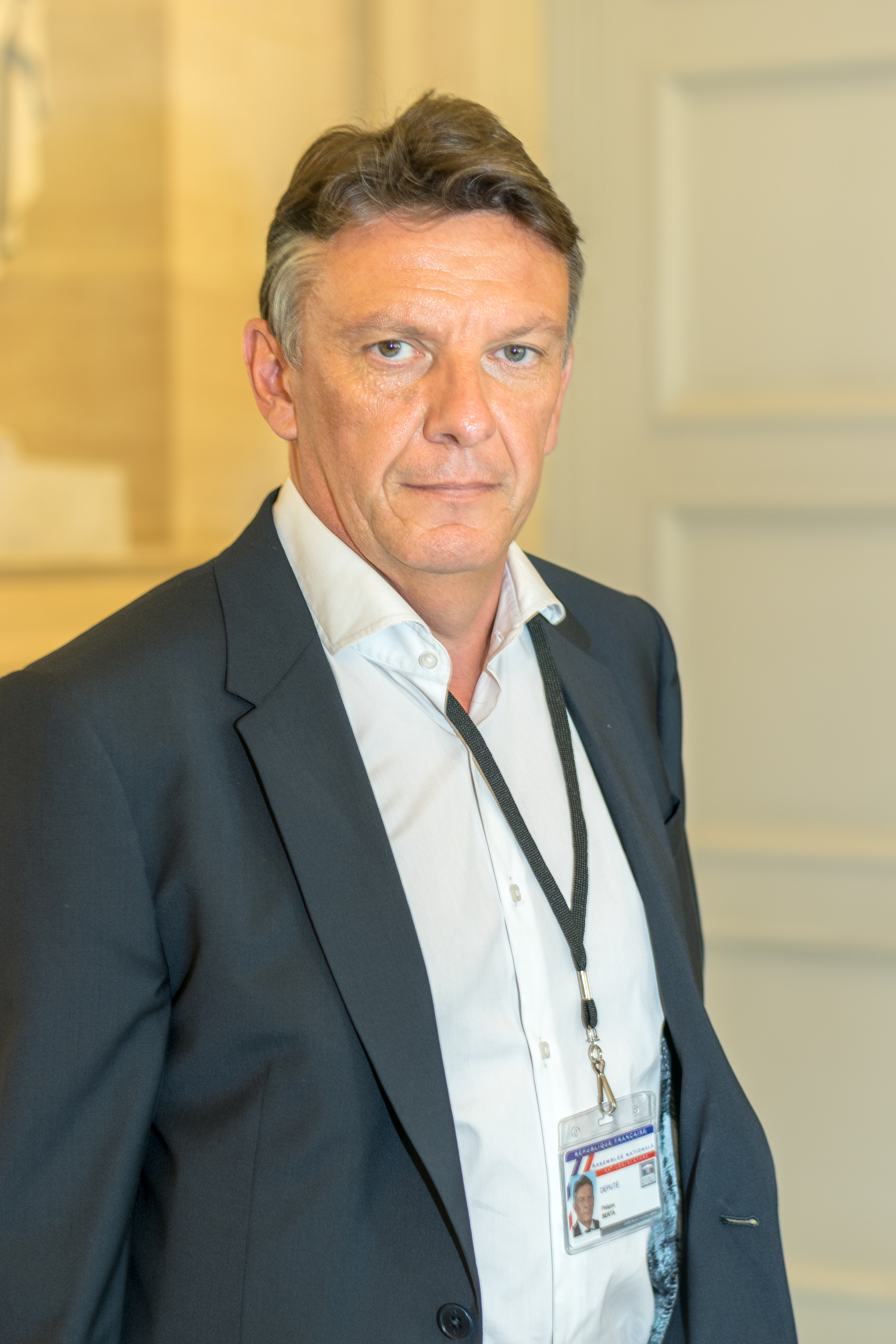

Member of the National Assembly for Gard's 6th constituency
- In office 21 June 2017 – 9 June 2024
- Preceded by: Christophe Cavard
- Succeeded by: Sylvie Josserand

Personal details
- Born: 11 April 1960 (age 66) Besançon, France
- Party: MoDem

Philippe Berta (born 11 April 1960) is a French geneticist and politician of the Democratic Movement (MoDem) who has been serving as member of the French National Assembly since 18 June 2017, representing the department of Gard.

== Political career ==
In parliament, Merta serves as member of the Committee on Cultural Affairs and Education and the Parliamentary Office for the Evaluation of Scientific and Technological Choices. Amid the COVID-19 pandemic in France, he was appointed to chair a parliamentary working group on research into the virus.

In addition to his committee assignments, Merta is a member of the French-Swiss Parliamentary Friendship Group.

== See also ==
- 2017 French legislative election
