= Haut-Rhin's 6th constituency =

Constituency of the National Assembly of France

6th constituency of the Haut-Rhin
- inline Constituency of the National Assembly of France

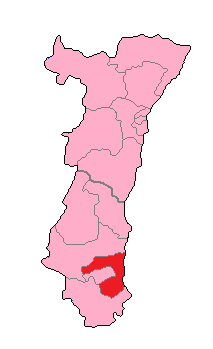
- Haut-Rhin's 6th Constituency shown within Alsace
- Deputy: Bruno Fuchs; MoDem
- Department: Haut-Rhin
- Cantons: Illzach, Mulhouse-Nord, Wittenheim, Sierentz
- Registered voters: 92,477

The 6th constituency of the Haut-Rhin is a French legislative constituency in the Haut-Rhin département.

== Description ==
The constituency is largely composed of the north of Mulhouse and its suburbs of Illzach and Wittenheim, however it also includes the canton of Sierentz to the south east.

In 2012 the constituency was unique among the constituencies of Haut-Rhin by being represented by someone other than the UMP, however the victorious party New Centre was closely allied to them.

== Historic Representation ==
Election	Member	Party
1986	Proportional representation - no election by constituency	
1988	Jean-Jacques Weber	UDF
1993	Jean-Jacques Weber	UDF
1997	Jean-Jacques Weber	UDF
2000	Francis Hillmeyer	UDF
2002	Francis Hillmeyer	UDF
2007	Francis Hillmeyer	NC
2012	Francis Hillmeyer	NC
2017	Bruno Fuchs	LREM
2020	Bruno Fuchs	MoDem
2022	Bruno Fuchs	MoDem

== Election results ==
=== 2024 ===
Legislative Election 2024: Haut-Rhin's 6th constituency
Party	Candidate	Votes	%	±%
DLF	Romuald Lourenco	666	1.14	n/a
DIV	Pablo Roldan-Sanchez	85	0.15	n/a
DVE	Pascal Blum	808	1.38	−0.72
LFI (NFP)	Florence Claudepierre	12,913	22.08	+2.81
LO	Nathalie Mulot	503	0.86	n/a
MoDem (Ensemble)	Bruno Fuchs	17660	30.19	−1.98
RN	Christelle Ritz	23246	39.74	+14.49
REC	Denis Pint	711	1.22	−3.31
UL	Laurent Roth	1898	3.24	−1.38
Turnout		58,490	97.54	+57.12
Registered electors		93,861		
2nd round result
MoDem	Bruno Fuchs (politician)	32,651	55.25	+25.06
RN	Christelle Ritz	26,444	44.75	+5.01
Turnout		93,929	65.34	+1.45
Registered electors		59,095		
MoDem hold		Swing		

=== 2022 ===
Legislative Election 2022: Haut-Rhin's 6th constituency
Party	Candidate	Votes	%	±%
MoDem (Ensemble)	Bruno Fuchs	11,996	32.17	-0.19
RN	Christelle Ritz	9,415	25.25	+7.94
LFI (NUPÉS)	Léonie Hebert	7,186	19.27	+7.25
UL (REG)	Laurent Roth	1,724	4.62	−1.07
REC	Sylvain Marcelli	1,688	4.53	N/A
LC (UDC)	Anne Gerhart	1,618	4.34	−12.23
DVE	Hugo Tarantola	792	2.12	+0.81
DVE	Pascal Blum	785	2.10	+0.25
Others	N/A	2,089	-	−
Turnout		37,293	40.42	−1.45
2nd round result
MoDem (Ensemble)	Bruno Fuchs	18,604	55.31	-8.85
RN	Christelle Ritz	15,030	44.69	+8.85
Turnout		33,634	38.11	+3.69
MoDem hold				

=== 2017 ===
Legislative Election 2017: Haut-Rhin's 6th constituency
Party	Candidate	Votes	%	±%
LREM	Bruno Fuchs	12,519	32.36	
FN	Sylvain Marcelli	6,696	17.31	
UDI	Francis Hillmeyer	6,412	16.57	
LFI	Philippe Duffau	3,432	8.87	
DVD	Lara Million	3,244	8.39	
REG	Laurent Roth (Unser Land)	2,203	5.69	
PS	Pierre Parra	980	2.53	
Others	N/A	3,202		
Turnout		38,688	41.87	
2nd round result
LREM	Bruno Fuchs	20,408	64.16	
FN	Sylvain Marcelli	11,401	35.84	
Turnout		31,809	34.42	
LREM gain from UDI				

Source: Ministry of the Interior

=== 2012 ===
Legislative Election 2012: Haut-Rhin's 6th constituency
Party	Candidate	Votes	%	±%
NM	Francis Hillmeyer	17,417	36.99	
PS	Malika Schmidlin-Ben M'Barek	12,394	26.32	
FN	Martine Binder	11,859	25.19	
EELV	Laurent Boitelle	1,694	3.60	
FG	Hubert Strauel	1,331	2.83	
Others	N/A	2,387		
Turnout		47,082	50.91	
2nd round result
NM	Francis Hillmeyer	20,382	44.11	
PS	Malika Schmidlin-Ben M'Barek	15,045	32.56	
FN	Martine Binder	10,785	23.34	
Turnout		46,212	49.97	
NM hold				

=== 2007 ===
Legislative Election 2007: Haut-Rhin's 6th Constituency 1st round
Party	Candidate	Votes	%	±%
NM	Francis Hillmeyer	19,341	50.36	
PS	Antoine Homé	8848	23.04	
FN	Martine Binder	3,348	8.72	
MoDem	Raphaëlle Vagignay	2,520	6.56	
LV	Cléo Pascale Schweitzer	1,399	3.64	
	Henri Metzger	824	2.15	
MEI	Jean Bitterlin	622	1.62	
MPF	Andréa Mele	612	1.59	
LO	Camille Bailly	563	1.47	
	Gilles Bastos	313	0.81	
MNR	Hélène Jacobi	19	0.05	
Turnout		39,220	52.46	
NM hold		Swing		
