= Yvelines's 6th constituency =

Constituency of the National Assembly of France

6th constituency of Yvelines
- inline Constituency of the National Assembly of France

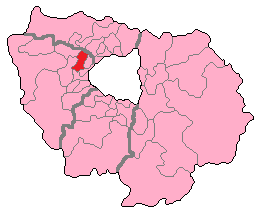
- Yvelines' 6th Constituency shown within Île-de-France
- Deputy: Natalia Pouzyreff; RE
- Department: Yvelines
- Cantons: Le Pecq, Saint-Germain-en-Laye-Nord, Saint-Germain-en-Laye Sud, Poissy-Nord (Part)
- Registered voters: 74,199

The 6th constituency of Yvelines is a French legislative constituency in the Yvelines département.

== Description ==
The 6th constituency of Yvelines consists of the town Saint-Germain-en-Laye and its environs. It also includes the Forest of Saint-Germain-en-Laye which sits within a loop of the Seine.

Like much of Yvelines the seat was staunchly conservative until 2017. Pierre Morange was elected following the death of his predecessor Michel Péricard in 1999.

== Historic Representation ==
Election	Member	Party
1967	Robert Wagner	UDR
1968	Robert Wagner	UDR
1973	Robert Wagner	UDR
1978	Robert Wagner	RPR
1981	Robert Wagner	RPR
1986	Proportional representation – no election by constituency	
1988	Michel Péricard	RPR
1993	Michel Péricard	RPR
1997	Michel Péricard	RPR
1999	Pierre Morange	RPR
2002	Pierre Morange	UMP
2007	Pierre Morange	UMP
2012	Pierre Morange	UMP
2017	Natalia Pouzyreff	LREM
2022	Natalia Pouzyreff	RE

== Election results ==
=== 2024 ===
Candidate	Party	Alliance	First round			Second round		
Candidate	Party	Alliance	Votes	%	+/–	Votes	%	+/–
Natalia Pouzyreff	RE	ENS	20,212	38.33	+0.55	24,322	47.83	+9.50
Mélinda Sauger	LFI	NFP	14,247	27.02	+2.52	14,837	29.18	+2.16
Sophie Lelandais	RN		10,781	20.45	+12.59	11,693	22.99	+2.54
Stéphane Torrez	LR		4,028	7.64	-10.09			
Jean-Luc Suzé	DVE		1,668	3.16	N/A			
Anne-Elisabeth Sild	REC		760	1.44	-5.44			
Claire Coueignas	DLF		533	1.01	-0.57			
Cécile Perraudin	LO		222	0.42	-0.39			
Ken Arméde	NPA		120	0.23	N/A			
Patrice Hernot	DIV		84	0.16	N/A			
Marc Philipot	DIV		71	0.13	N/A			
Leo Müllbacher	DIV		0	0.00	N/A			
Valid votes			52,726	98.40	±0.00	50,852	97.57	-0.83
Blank votes			623	1.16	-0.01	955	1.83	+0.67
Null votes			233	0.43	+0.01	311	0.60	+0.17
Turnout			53,582	69.50	+18.58	52,118	67.58	-1.92
Abstentions			23,514	30.50	-18.58	25,004	32.42	+1.92
Registered voters			77,096			77,122		
Source: Ministry of the Interior, Le Monde
Result						REN HOLD		

=== 2022 ===
Legislative Election 2022: Yvelines's 6th constituency
Party	Candidate	Votes	%	±%
LREM (Ensemble)	Natalia Pouzyreff	14,378	37.78	-10.13
LFI (NUPÉS)	Mélinda Sauger	9,323	24.50	+11.38
LR (UDC)	Thibault De Montbrial	6,747	17.73	−8.72
RN	Maria Macedo De Souza	2,993	7.86	+1.78
REC	Stéphane Boucher	2,617	6.88	N/A
PA	Jean-Luc Suze	890	2.34	N/A
Others	N/A	1,107	2.34	
Turnout		38,055	50.92	+0.21
2nd round result
LREM (Ensemble)	Natalia Pouzyreff	22,244	64.52	+6.18
LFI (NUPÉS)	Mélinda Sauger	12,231	35.48	N/A
Turnout		34,475	48.48	+6.57
LREM hold				

=== 2017 ===
Legislative Election 2017: Yvelines's 6th constituency
Party	Candidate	Votes	%	±%
LREM	Natalia Pouzyreff	18,396	47.91	
LR	Pierre Morange	10,155	26.45	
LFI	Nelly Pascaud	3,295	8.58	
FN	Didier Rouxel	2,333	6.08	
PCF	Josiane Dupé-Suarez	1,744	4.54	
Others	N/A	2,470		
Turnout		38,393	50.71	
2nd round result
LREM	Natalia Pouzyreff	18,510	58.34	
LR	Pierre Morange	13,219	41.66	
Turnout		31,729	41.91	
LREM gain from LR				

=== 2012 ===
Legislative Election 2012: Yvelines's 6th constituency
Party	Candidate	Votes	%	±%
UMP	Pierre Morange	18,525	45.23	
PRG	Eddie Aït	11,411	27.86	
FN	Judith Louvel	3,499	8.54	
FG	Alain Outreman	2,410	5.88	
AC	Franck Chefdor	1,709	4.17	
EELV	Karine Peiger	1,492	3.64	
Others	N/A	1,915		
Turnout		41,377	55.76	
2nd round result
UMP	Pierre Morange	22,486	59.60	
PRG	Eddie Aït	15,245	40.40	
Turnout		38,811	52.31	
UMP hold				

=== 2007 ===
Legislative Election 2007: Yvelines's 6th constituency
Party	Candidate	Votes	%	±%
UMP	Pierre Morange	19,627	54.02	
PS	Patrick Abisseror	4,992	13.74	
MoDem	Stéphane Larcher	4,602	12.67	
PCF	Alain Outreman	2,853	7.85	
FN	Christine Inglebert	1,221	3.36	
LV	Karina Knauss	1,095	3.01	
MPF	Eric de Saint Martin	763	2.10	
Others	N/A	1,178		
Turnout		36,787	60.65	
UMP hold				

=== 2002 ===
Legislative Election 2002: Yvelines's 6th constituency
Party	Candidate	Votes	%	±%
UMP	Pierre Morange	15,907	42.69	
PS	Jean Laurent	7,122	19.12	
DVD	Emmanuel Lamy	6,772	18.18	
FN	Marie-José Tanturri	2,825	7.58	
PCF	Alain Outreman	1,581	4.24	
LV	Nicole Frydman	1,362	3.66	
Others	N/A	1,689		
Turnout		37,625	66.77	
2nd round result
UMP	Pierre Morange	21,518	67.76	
PS	Jean Laurent	10,240	32.24	
Turnout		32,967	58.51	
UMP hold				

=== 1997 ===
Legislative Election 1997: Yvelines's 6th constituency
Party	Candidate	Votes	%	±%
RPR	Michel Péricard	14,969	42.08	
PS	Jean Laurent	6,593	18.54	
FN	Jacques Lecaillon	4,310	12.12	
PCF	Pierre Soulat	3,586	10.08	
DVD	Olvier Podvin	1,694	4.76	
LV	Nicole Frydman	1,450	4.08	
GE	Fulvia Dorosz	861	2.42	
DIV	Jean-Henri Michau	785	2.21	
LO	Jean-Claude Hamon	754	2.12	
Others	N/A	567		
Turnout		36,905	66.66	
2nd round result
RPR	Michel Péricard	21,644	61.47	
PS	Jean Laurent	13,568	38.53	
Turnout		37,242	67.28	
RPR hold				

== Sources ==
Official results of French elections from 2002: "Résultats électoraux officiels en France" (in French).
