= Julie Delpech =

French politician (born 1989)

Deputy of the National Assembly for Sarthe's 1st constituency
- Incumbent
- Assumed office 22 June 2022
- Preceded by: Damien Pichereau

Personal details
- Born: 25 September 1989 (age 36) Le Mans, France
- Party: Renaissance
- Parent(s): Patrick Delpech; Pascale Fontenel-Personne

Julie Delpech (born 25 September 1989) is a French politician from the governing Renaissance party.

== Biography ==
Julie Delpech is the daughter of former member of parliament Pascale Fontenel-Personne and Patrick Delpech who was federal secretary of the Sarthe Socialist Party for several years.

From 2010 to 2014, she was a collaborator of the “Socialist and Republicans” group in the Pays de la Loire region, before working, from 2014 to 2017, as a parliamentary attaché for the Socialist senator-mayor Jean-Claude Boulard and as a collaborator of the mayor of Le Mans until 2018.

After this date, she took on the position of communications manager for the Oui Care group based in Le Mans.

In the 2022 French legislative election she was elected as a Renaissance (ex-LREM) candidate in Sarthe's 1st constituency.

On 28 March 2024, the French National Assembly approved a resolution presented by Greens MP Sabrina Sebaihi and Delpech condemning the Paris massacre of 1961 as a "bloody and murderous repression" of Algerians.

In the 2024 French legislative election, she was re-elected in the second round after coming second in the first.

== See also ==
- List of deputies of the 16th National Assembly of France
- List of deputies of the 17th National Assembly of France
