= Bertrand Sorre =

French politician

Member of the National Assembly for Manche's 2nd constituency
- Incumbent
- Assumed office 21 June 2017
- Preceded by: Guénhaël Huet

Personal details
- Born: 8 May 1965 (age 60) Cherbourg-en-Cotentin, France
- Party: La République En Marche!

Bertrand Sorre (born 8 May 1965) is a French politician of La République En Marche! (LREM) who has been serving as a member of the French National Assembly since the 2017 elections, representing the department of Manche.

== Political career ==
In parliament, Sorre serves as member of the Committee on Cultural Affairs and Education. In addition to his committee assignments, he is part of the French parliamentary friendship groups with Azerbaijan and North Macedonia. He was also a member of the French delegation to the Parliamentary Assembly of the Council of Europe from 2017 until 2019.

== Political positions ==
In July 2019, Sorre voted in favor of the French ratification of the European Union’s Comprehensive Economic and Trade Agreement (CETA) with Canada.

In a joint open letter with Julien Borowczyk and Grégory Galbadon which was published in Le Point in October 2019, Sorre defended the controversial decisions to have the 2019 World Athletics Championships and the 2022 FIFA World Cup take place in Qatar.

== See also ==
- 2017 French legislative election
