= Vienne's 4th constituency =

Constituency of the National Assembly of France

4th constituency of Vienne
- inline Constituency of the National Assembly of France

- Constituency in department

- Vienne in France
- Deputy: Nicolas Turquois; MoDem
- Department: Vienne
- Cantons: Châtellerault Nord, Châtellerault Ouest, Châtellerault Sud, Dangé-Saint-Romain, Lencloître, Loudun, Moncontour, Monts-sur-Guesnes, Pleumartin (without the commune of La Puye), Saint-Gervais-les-Trois-Clochers, Les Trois-Moutiers.

The 4th constituency of Vienne is a French legislative constituency in the Vienne département.

== Deputies ==
Election	Member	Party
1988	Édith Cresson	PS
1993	Jean-Pierre Abelin	UDF
1997	Jean-Pierre Abelin	UDF
2002	Jean-Pierre Abelin	UDF
2007	Jean-Pierre Abelin	NC
2012	Véronique Massonneau	EELV
2017	Nicolas Turquois	MoDem
2022	Nicolas Turquois	MoDem

== Election results ==
=== 2024 ===
Candidate	Party	Alliance	First round		Second round	
Candidate	Party	Alliance	Votes	%	Votes	%
Nicolas Turquois	MoDEM	Ensemble	15,076	32.11	25,152	53.95
Hager Jacquemin	RN		19,268	41.04	21,468	46.05
Yves Trousselle	DVG	NFP	9,901	21.09		
Patrick Minot	Ind	DVC	752	1.60		
Sabine Bortolotti	DLF	DSV	752	1.60		
Patrice Villeret	LO		691	1.47		
Valid votes			46,951	96.73	46,620	95.39
Blank votes			945	1.95	1,543	3.16
Null votes			640	1.32	708	1.45
Turnout			48,536	65.87	48,871	66.32
Abstentions			25,143	34.13	24,814	33.68
Registered voters			73,679		73,685	
Result			MoDEM HOLD			

=== 2022 ===
Legislative Election 2022: Vienne's 4th constituency
Party	Candidate	Votes	%	±%
MoDem (Ensemble)	Nicolas Turquois	12,919	37.62	+6.78
RN	Marion Latus	9,739	28.36	+11.07
PS (NUPÉS)	Flavien Cartier	7,937	23.11	+10.44
REC	Alain Verdin	1,434	4.18	N/A
LO	Patrice Villeret	891	2.59	N/A
Others	N/A	1,421	4.14	
Turnout		34,341	48.04	+0.55
2nd round result
MoDem (Ensemble)	Nicolas Turquois	16,938	54.58	+3.24
RN	Marion Latus	14,098	45.42	N/A
Turnout		31,036	46.10	+8.75
MoDem hold				

=== 2017 ===
Legislative Election 2017: Vienne's 4th constituency
Party	Candidate	Votes	%	±%
MoDem	Nicolas Turquois	11,089	30.84	
UDI	Anne-Florence Bourat	6,799	18.91	
FN	Alain Verdin	6,215	17.29	
PÉ	Véronique Massonneau	5,031	13.99	
LFI	Aurélie Saulnier	3,554	9.88	
PCF	Clarice Pereira	1,002	2.79	
Others	N/A	2,264		
Turnout		35,954	47.49	
2nd round result
MoDem	Nicolas Turquois	14,508	51.34	
UDI	Anne-Florence Bourat	13,752	48.66	
Turnout		28,260	37.35	
MoDem gain from PÉ				

=== 2012 ===
Legislative Election 2012: Vienne's 4th constituency
Party	Candidate	Votes	%	±%
NM	Jean-Pierre Abelin	14,195	33.75	
EELV	Véronique Massonneau	8,404	19.98	
DVG	Christian Michaud	7,483	17.79	
FN	Eric Audebert	6,158	14.64	
PCF	Pierre Baraudon	2,694	6.41	
MoDem	Nicolas Turquois	1,099	2.61	
Others	N/A	2,026		
Turnout		42,059	55.38	
2nd round result
EELV	Véronique Massonneau	21,330	50.67	
NM	Jean-Pierre Abelin	20,769	49.33	
Turnout		42,099	55.43	
EELV gain from NM				

=== 2007 ===
Legislative Election 2007: Vienne's 4th constituency
Party	Candidate	Votes	%	±%
NM	Jean-Pierre Abelin	20,237	46.16	
PS	Bigitte Tondusson	11,296	25.77	
LV	Véronique Massonneau	2,173	4.96	
FN	Eric Audebert	2,124	4.84	
PCF	Paul Fromonteil	2,023	4.61	
CPNT	Sylvie Gaillard	1,242	2.83	
MPF	Pierre-Claude Fouquenet	1,122	2.56	
Far left	Patrice Villeret	1,052	2.40	
Others	N/A	2,573		
Turnout		45,382	59.80	
2nd round result
NM	Jean-Pierre Abelin	24,282	56.62	
PS	Bigitte Tondusson	18,605	43.38	
Turnout		45,265	59.65	
NM hold				

=== 2002 ===
Legislative Election 2002: Vienne's 4th constituency
Party	Candidate	Votes	%	±%
UDF	Jean-Pierre Abelin	21,671	46.44	
PS	Brigitte Tondusson	11,488	24.62	
FN	Eric Audebert	4,393	9.41	
LV	Véronique Massonneau	2,174	4.66	
PCF	Chantal Vacheron	1,749	3.75	
CPNT	Catherine Brillault	1,555	3.33	
LO	Patrice Villeret	992	2.13	
Others	N/A	2,641		
Turnout		47,990	64.68	
2nd round result
UDF	Jean-Pierre Abelin	26,010	59.97	
PS	Brigitte Tondusson	17,364	40.03	
Turnout		45,490	61.31	
UDF hold				

=== 1997 ===
Legislative Election 1997: Vienne's 4th constituency
Party	Candidate	Votes	%	±%
UDF	Jean-Pierre Abelin	15,350	33.37	
PS	Brigitte Tondusson	11,346	24.67	
FN	Françoise Couturier	6,510	14.15	
PCF	Paul Fromonteil	4,529	9.85	
LV	Marcel Doreau	2,674	5.81	
LO	Patrice Vuilleret	1,851	4.02	
DVD	Patrick Texier	1,618	3.52	
DIV	Joël Quéméner	1,218	2.65	
Others	N/A	901		
Turnout		49,398	68.21	
2nd round result
UDF	Jean-Pierre Abelin	24,484	50.02	
PS	Brigitte Tondusson	24,469	49.98	
Turnout		52,640	72.69	
UDF hold				
