= Manche's 2nd constituency =

Constituency of the National Assembly of France

2nd constituency of Manche
- inline Constituency of the National Assembly of France

- Deputy: Bertrand Sorre; RE
- Department: Manche
- Cantons: Avranches - Barenton - Brécey - Ducey - Granville - La Haye-Pesnel - Isigny-le-Buat - Juvigny-le-Tertre - Mortain - Pontorson - Saint-Hilaire-du-Harcouët - Saint-James - Saint-Pois - Sartilly - Sourdeval - Le Teilleul
- Registered voters: 128,459

The 2nd constituency of Manche is a French legislative constituency in the Manche département. Like the other 576 French constituencies, it elects one MP using the two-round system, with a run-off if no candidate receives over 50% of the vote in the first round.

== Deputies ==
Election	Member	Party
1958	Pierre Hénault	CNIP
1962	Émile Bizet	UNR
1967	Émile Bizet	UDR
1968	Émile Bizet	UDR
1973	Émile Bizet	UDR
1978	Émile Bizet	RPR
1981	Émile Bizet	RPR
1986	Proportional representation – no election by constituency	
1988	René André	RPR
1993	René André	RPR
1997	René André	RPR
2002	René André	UMP
2007	Guénhaël Huet	DVD
2012	Guénhaël Huet	UMP
2017	Bertrand Sorre	LREM
2022	Bertrand Sorre	RE

== Election results ==
=== 2024 ===
Legislative Election 2024: Manche's 2nd constituency
Party	Candidate	Votes	%	±%
REC	Hervé Retailleau	721	1.08	−2.33
RE (Ensemble)	Bertrand Sorre	26,555	39.91	−2.71
LO	Mai Tran	811	1.22	N/A
LFI (NFP)	Patrick Grimbert	11,529	17.33	−1.17
RN	Marie-Françoise Kurdziel	21,186	31.84	+13.86
DVD	Jule Barenton-Guillas	5,739	8.62	N/A
Turnout		66541	97.48	46.24
Registered electors		96,780		
2nd round result
RE	Bertrand Sorre	40,472	62.90	+22.99
RN	Marie-Françoise Kurdziel	23,870	37.10	+5.26
Turnout		64,342	95.14	−2.34
Registered electors		64,342		
RE hold		Swing		

=== 2022 ===
Legislative Election 2022: Manche's 2nd constituency
Party	Candidate	Votes	%	±%
LREM (Ensemble)	Bertrand Sorre	20,620	42.62	-2.29
LFI (NUPÉS)	Patrick Grimbert	8,949	18.50	+6.50
RN	Marie-Françoise Kurdziel	8,700	17.98	+8.12
LR (UDC)	Erwan Toullec Dufour	3,860	7.98	−19.28
REC	Denis Feret	1,648	3.41	N/A
DVE	Florence Filuzeau	1,466	3.03	N/A
DIV	Anne-Marie Lair	1,155	2.39	N/A
Others	N/A	1,980	4.09	
Turnout		48,378	51.24	−3.55
2nd round result
LREM (Ensemble)	Bertrand Sorre	28,279	64.44	+3.44
LFI (NUPÉS)	Patrick Grimbert	15,602	35.56	N/A
Turnout		43,881	49.06	+0.54
LREM hold				

=== 2017 ===
Candidate	Label	First round		Second round	
Candidate	Label	Votes	%	Votes	%
Bertrand Sorre	REM	22,954	44.91	26,190	61.00
Guénhaël Huet	LR	13,929	27.26	16,747	39.00
Marie-Françoise Kurdziel	FN	5,038	9.86		
Patrick Grimbert	FI	3,236	6.33		
Miloud Mansour	PCF	1,610	3.15		
Nicolas Ferreira	DVG	1,542	3.02		
Sophie Nicklaus	ECO	1,290	2.52		
Amélia Bertrand	DIV	411	0.80		
Laurence Derrey	EXG	371	0.73		
Quentin Douté	EXD	312	0.61		
Jean-François Hème	ECO	298	0.58		
Régis Breux	DVG	115	0.23		
Votes		51,106	100.00	42,937	100.00
Valid votes		51,106	97.68	42,937	92.69
Blank votes		871	1.66	2,504	5.41
Null votes		341	0.65	884	1.91
Turnout		52,318	54.79	46,325	48.52
Abstentions		43,173	45.21	49,156	51.48
Registered voters		95,491		95,481	
Source: Ministry of the Interior, L'Express

=== 2012 ===
Legislative Election 2012: Manche's 2nd constituency
Party	Candidate	Votes	%	±%
UMP	Guénhaël Huet	24,483	42.86	
PRG	Gérard Sauré	9,449	16.54	
DVG	Gérard Dieudonne	7,839	13.72	
FN	Marie-Françoise Kurdziel	5,592	9.79	
MoDem	Bernard Trehet	4,740	8.30	
EELV	Jean Leguelinel	1,933	3.38	
FG	Patrice Cella	1,876	3.28	
Others	N/A	1,216		
Turnout		57,127	60.38	
2nd round result
UMP	Guénhaël Huet	31,814	60.71	
PRG	Gérard Sauré	20,586	39.29	
Turnout		52,400	55.37	
UMP gain from DVD				

=== 2007 ===
Legislative Election 2007: Manche 2nd - 2nd round
Party	Candidate	Votes	%	±%
DVD	Guénhaël Huet	25,528	57.86	
UMP	Philippe Bas	18,593	42.14	
Turnout		47,655	62.69	
DVD hold		Swing		

== Sources and References ==
- French Interior Ministry results website: "Résultats électoraux officiels en France" (in French).
- "Résultats électoraux officiels en France" (in French). 2017.
