= Sylvie Josserand =

French politician of the National Rally (born 1968)

Sylvie Josserand MEP
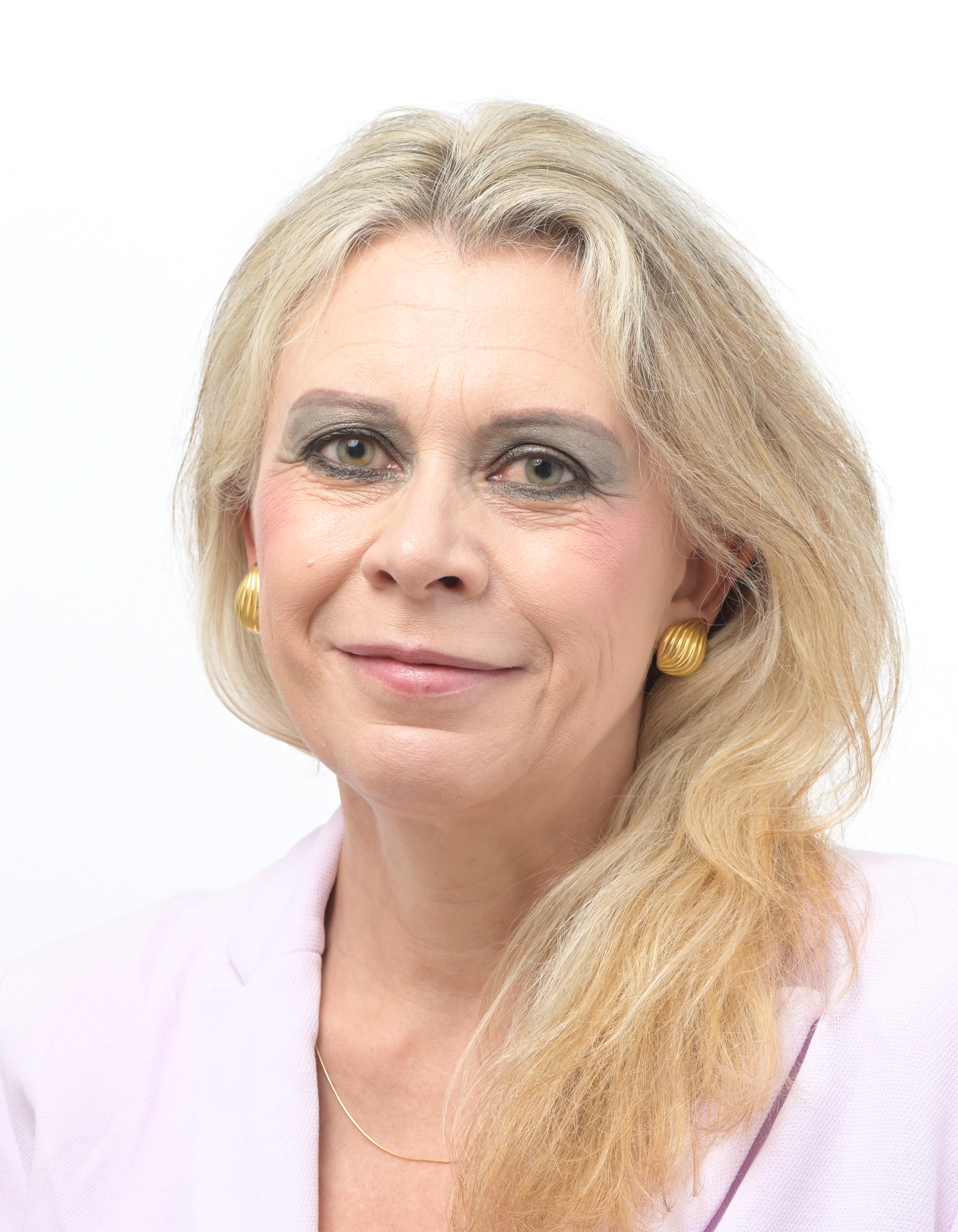

Member of the European Parliament for France
- In office 16 July 2024 – 27 September 2024

Personal details
- Born: 23 August 1968 (age 57)
- Party: National Rally
- Other political affiliations: Identity and Democracy Party

Sylvie Josserand (born 23 August 1968) is a French politician of the National Rally who was elected member of the European Parliament in 2024.

In the 2024 French legislative election, she was elected Member of Parliament for Gard's 6th constituency.

== See also ==
- List of deputies of the 17th National Assembly of France
- List of members of the European Parliament (2024–2029)
