= Gard's 6th constituency =

Constituency of the National Assembly of France

6th constituency of Gard
- inline Constituency of the National Assembly of France

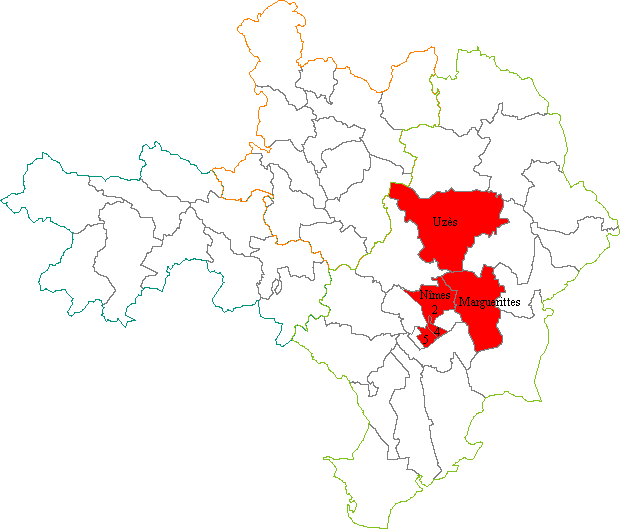
- Location of constituency in Department

- Deputy: Sylvie Josserand; RN
- Department: Gard

The 6th constituency of Gard is a French legislative constituency in the Gard département.

== Deputies ==
Election	Member	Party
2012	Christophe Cavard	EELV
2017	Philippe Berta	MoDem
2022	Philippe Berta	MoDem
2024	Sylvie Josserand	RN

== Election results ==
=== 2024 ===
Candidate	Party	Alliance	First round			Second round		
Candidate	Party	Alliance	Votes	%	+/–	Votes	%	+/–
Sylvie Josserand	RN		23,382	42.07	+17.93	26,838	51.40	new
Nicolas Cadène	LE	NFP	15,992	28.77	-3.12	25,381	48.60	new
Aurélien Colson	MoDEM	Ensemble	11,521	20.73	-3.65			
Clément Stevant	LR	UDC	3,202	5.76	-3.45			
Laura Affortit	REG		1,110	2.00				
Aïcha Terbeche	LO		377	0.68	-0.01			
Votes			55,584	100.00		52,219	100.00	
Valid votes			55,584	98.02	-0.14	52,219	92.39	+2.46
Blank votes			793	1.40	+0.06	3,232	5.72	+1.97
Null votes			330	0.58	+0.08	1,070	1.89	+1.52
Turnout			56,707	66.27	+21.26	56,521	66.04	+22.91
Abstentions			28,866	33.73	-21.26	29,071	33.96	-22.91
Registered voters			85,573			85,592		
Result			RN GAIN FROM MoDEM					

=== 2022 ===
Legislative Election 2022: Gard's 6th constituency
Party	Candidate	Votes	%	±%
EELV (NUPÉS)	Nicolas Cadene	9,582	25.65	+0.84
MoDem (Ensemble)	Philippe Berta	9,107	24.38	-9.14
RN	Laurence Gardet	9,018	24.14	+2.40
LR (UDC)	François Courdil	3,439	9.21	−4.01
REC	Stéphane Guillemin	2,779	7.44	N/A
FGR	Jean-Claude Maurin	1,109	2.97	N/A
Others	N/A	2,318	6.21	
Turnout		37,352	45.01	−1.39
2nd round result
MoDem (Ensemble)	Philippe Berta	16,921	52.17	-8.18
EELV (NUPÉS)	Nicolas Cadene	15,514	47.83	N/A
Turnout		32,435	43.13	+2.57
MoDem gain from LREM				

=== 2017 ===
Candidate	Label	First round		Second round	
Candidate	Label	Votes	%	Votes	%
Philippe Berta	REM	12,397	33.52	17,879	60.35
Laurence Gardet	FN	8,040	21.74	11,747	39.65
Karine Voinchet	FI	4,910	13.28		
Richard Flandin	LR	4,890	13.22		
Christophe Cavard	ECO	2,990	8.08		
Philippe Gasser	PCF	1,275	3.45		
Sibylle Jannekeyn	ECO	823	2.23		
Jacques Armando	DLF	666	1.80		
Jérémy Delapierre	DVD	291	0.79		
Jean-Paul Elisseieff	ECO	260	0.70		
Laurent Charpy	DIV	259	0.70		
Aïcha Terbèche	EXG	179	0.48		
Jean-Claude Boussouf	DVG	4	0.01		
Votes		36,984	100.00	29,626	100.00
Valid votes		36,984	98.22	29,626	89.99
Blank votes		497	1.32	2,325	7.06
Null votes		175	0.46	972	2.95
Turnout		37,656	46.40	32,923	40.56
Abstentions		43,499	53.60	48,253	59.44
Registered voters		81,155		81,176	
Source: Ministry of the Interior

=== 2012 ===
2012 legislative election in Gard's 6th constituency
Candidate	Party	First round		Second round	
Candidate	Party	Votes	%	Votes	%
Christophe Cavard	EELV–PS	13,517	30.53%	19,444	43.09%
Franck Proust	UMP	11,804	26.66%	14,366	31.84%
Sylvie Vignon	FN	11,405	25.76%	11,310	25.07%
Martine Gayraud	FG	3,666	8.28%		
Philippe Berta	MoDem	1,027	2.32%		
Silvain Pastor	EELV dissident	576	1.30%		
Valérie Pezet	PRG	521	1.18%		
Camille Benezech	DLR	454	1.03%		
Mireille Ribanier	UDN	364	0.82%		
Mélinda Ceccchinato	??	355	0.80%		
Bruno Castel	NPA	226	0.51%		
Aïcha Terbeche	LO	125	0.28%		
Olivier Roudier		118	0.27%		
Jeremiah Guiraud	AEI	111	0.25%		
Valid votes		44,269	98.76%	45,120	98.41%
Spoilt and null votes		554	1.24%	729	1.59%
Votes cast / turnout		44,823	57.72%	45,849	59.05%
Abstentions		32,829	42.28%	31,793	40.95%
Registered voters		77,652	100.00%	77,642	100.00%
