= Loïc Kervran =

French politician

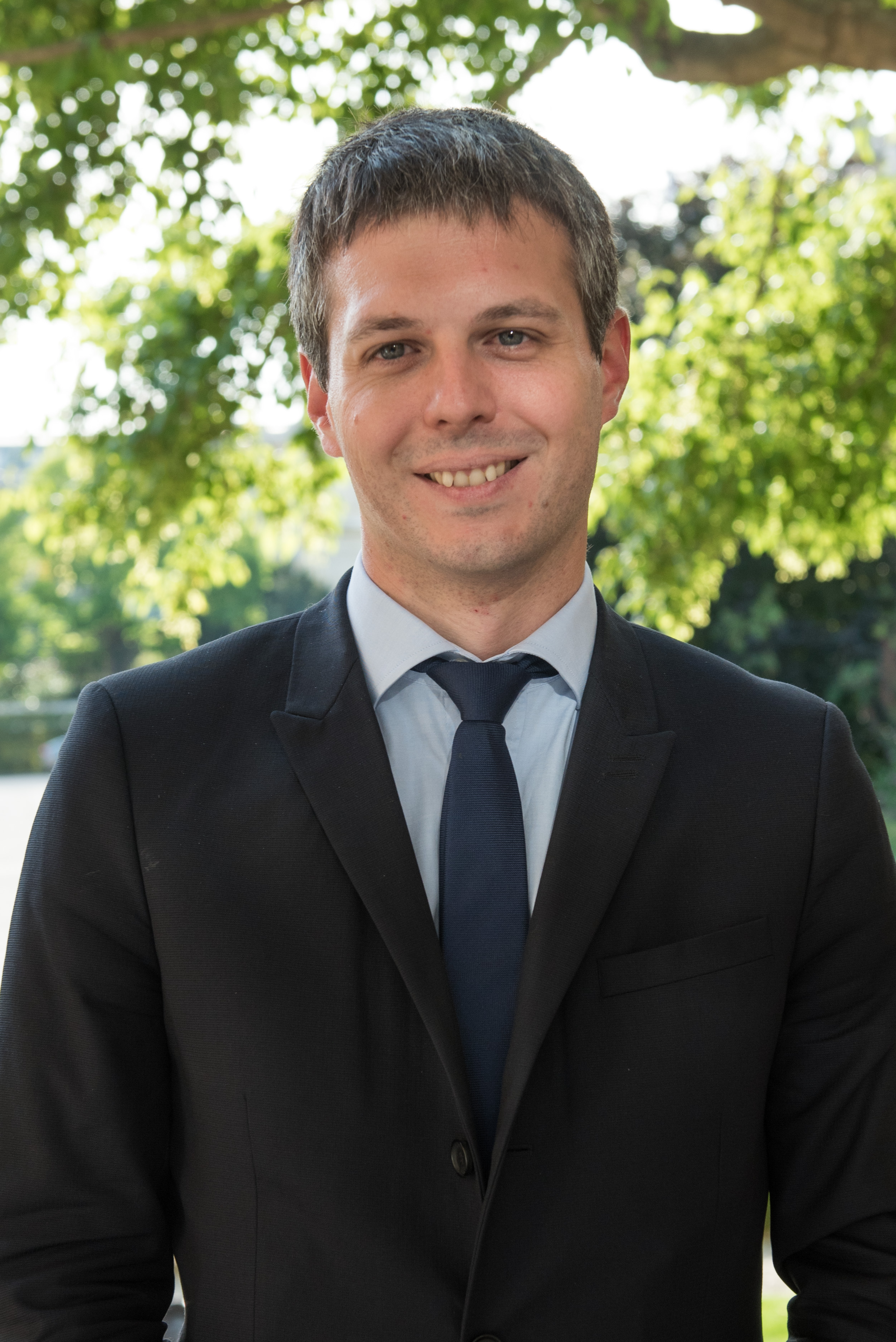

Member of the French National Assembly for Cher's 3rd constituency
- Incumbent
- Assumed office 21 June 2017
- Preceded by: Yann Galut

Personal details
- Born: 11 February 1984 (age 42) Moulins, France
- Party: Horizons (since 2021)
- Other political affiliations: La République En Marche! (2017-2020); Agir (2020-2021)
- Education: Sciences Po; London School of Economics

Loïc Kervran (born 11 February 1984) is a French politician of Horizons who was elected to the French National Assembly on 18 June 2017, representing the department of Cher.

== Political career ==
In parliament, Kervran serves as a member of the Committee on National Defense and the Armed Forces. In addition to his committee assignments, he is part of the parliamentary friendship groups with Jordan, Lebanon and Yemen.

In July 2019, Kervran decided not to align with his parliamentary group's majority and became one of 52 LREM members who abstained from voting on the French ratification of the European Union’s Comprehensive Economic and Trade Agreement (CETA) with Canada.

== See also ==
- 2017 French legislative election
