= Yann Galut =

French politician (born 1966)

Mayor of Bourges
- Incumbent
- Assumed office 3 July 2020
- Preceded by: Pascal Blanc

Member of the French National Assembly for Cher's 3rd constituency
- In office 20 June 2012 – 20 June 2017
- Preceded by: Louis Cosyns
- Succeeded by: Loïc Kervran
- In office 12 June 1997 – 21 April 2002
- Preceded by: Serge Lepeltier
- Succeeded by: Louis Cosyns

Personal details
- Born: 14 March 1966 (age 60)
- Party: Independent
- Other political affiliations: Socialist Party (1987–2021)

Yann Galut (born 14 March 1966) is a French politician serving as mayor of Bourges since 2020. He was a member of the National Assembly from 1997 to 2002 and from 2007 to 2012.
