= Cher's 3rd constituency =

Constituency of the National Assembly of France

- Constituency for the National Assembly
- Boundary of Cher's 3rd constituency in Cher

- Location of Cher within France
- Department: Cher
- Region: Centre-Val de Loire
- Population: 116,666 (2013)
- Electorate: 86,159 (2017)

Current constituency
- Deputy: Loïc Kervran
- Political party: H
- Parliamentary group: HOR

Cher's 3rd constituency is one of three French legislative constituencies in the department of Cher. It is currently represented by Loïc Kervran of Horizons.

== Historic representation ==
Legislature	Start of mandate	End of mandate	Deputy	Party
1st	9 December 1958	9 October 1962	Ferdinand Roques	UNR
2nd	6 December 1962	2 April 1967	Ferdinand Roques	UNR
3rd	3 April 1967	30 May 1968	Laurent Bilbeau	PCF
4th	11 July 1968	1 April 1973	Maurice Papon	UDR
5th	2 April 1973	2 April 1978	Maurice Papon	UDR
6th	3 April 1978	6 May 1978	Maurice Papon	RPR
6th	7 May 1978	22 May 1981	René Dubreuil	RPR
7th	2 July 1981	1 April 1986	Berthe Fiévet	PS
8th	2 April 1986	14 May 1988	Proportional representation	
9th	23 June 1988	1 April 1993	Alain Calmat	DVG
10th	2 April 1993	21 April 1997	Serge Lepeltier	RPR
11th	12 June 1997	18 June 2002	Yann Galut	PS
12th	19 June 2002	19 June 2007	Louis Cosyns	UMP
13th	20 June 2007	19 June 2012	Louis Cosyns	UMP
14th	20 June 2012	20 June 2017	Yann Galut	PS
15th	21 June 2017	18 December 2020	Loïc Kervran	LREM
15th	18 December 2020	21 June 2022	Loïc Kervran	Agir
16th	22 June 2022	9 June 2024	Loïc Kervran	H
16th	7 July 2024	ongoing	Loïc Kervran	H

== Elections ==
=== 2024 ===
Candidate	Party	Alliance	First round			Second round		
Candidate	Party	Alliance	Votes	%	+/–	Votes	%	+/–
Pierre Gentillet	RN		23,501	43.15	+15.63	25,578	47.21	+2.14
Loïc Kervran	HOR	Ensemble	16,991	31.20	-1.40	28,602	52.79	-2.14
Emma Moreira	LFI	NFP	9,334	17.14	-4.68			
Bénédicte de Choulot	LR	UDC	3,178	5.84	-1.93			
Eric Lougnon	REC		599	1.10	-3.11			
Eric Bellet	LO		568	1.04	-0.82			
Christa Chartier	DLF		290	0.53	-1.74			
Votes			54,461	100.00		54,180	100.00	
Valid votes			54,461	97.03	+0.13	54,180	95.59	+4.10
Blank votes			1,215	2.16	-0.14	1,883	3.32	-3.29
Null votes			450	0.80	-0.01	619	1.09	-0.82
Turnout			56,126	67.10	+17.29	56,682	67.75	+19.63
Abstentions			27,519	32.90	-17.29	26,984	32.25	-19.63
Registered voters			83,645			83,666		
Result			HOR HOLD					

=== 2022 ===
Legislative Election 2022: Cher's 3rd constituency
Party	Candidate	Votes	%	±%
HOR (Ensemble)	Loïc Kervran	13,299	32.60	-0.16
RN	Thibaut de La Tocnaye	11,226	27.52	+11.90
LFI (NUPÉS)	Aliénor Garcia-Bosch-de Morales	8,901	21.82	−13.10
LR (UDC)	Bénédicte de Choulot	3,171	7.77	−1.01
REC	Nathalie Marteel	1,717	4.21	N/A
DLF (UPF)	Frédéric Dumay	924	2.27	−0.65
Others	N/A	1,551	-	−
Turnout		40,789	49.81	−0.34
2nd round result
HOR (Ensemble)	Loïc Kervran	20,435	54.93	+4.01
RN	Thibaut de La Tocnaye	16,767	45.07	N/A
Turnout		37,202	48.12	+2.54
HOR gain from LREM				

=== 2017 ===
Candidate	Label	First round		Second round	
Candidate	Label	Votes	%	Votes	%
Loïc Kervran	REM	13,703	32.76	17,775	50.92
Yann Galut	PS	8,120	19.41	17,136	49.08
Jordan Le Goïc	FN	6,534	15.62		
Jean Riffet	FI	4,140	9.90		
Olivier Beatrix	UDI	3,504	8.38		
Magali Bessard	PCF	1,392	3.33		
Samuel Vaisson	DIV	1,358	3.25		
Éric Thevenin	DLF	1,222	2.92		
Catherine Menguy	ECO	954	2.28		
Alain Rodric	DIV	466	1.11		
Éric Bellet	EXG	267	0.64		
Louis Cosyns	LR	168	0.40		
Votes		41,828	100.00	34,911	100.00
Valid votes		41,828	96.77	34,911	88.91
Blank votes		1,056	2.44	3,103	7.90
Null votes		340	0.79	1,253	3.19
Turnout		43,224	50.15	39,267	45.58
Abstentions		42,957	49.85	46,892	54.42
Registered voters		86,181		86,159	
Source: Ministry of the Interior

=== 2012 ===
2012 legislative election in Cher's 3rd constituency
Candidate	Party	First round		Second round	
Candidate	Party	Votes	%	Votes	%
Yann Galut	PS	19,979	38.83%	27,644	55.46%
Louis Cosyns	UMP	15,380	29.89%	22,204	44.54%
Erwan Le Mintier	FN	7,962	15.47%		
Nadine Mechin	FG	3,825	7.43%		
Michel Mrozek	MoDem	2,040	3.96%		
Jorge Roig	EELV	1,293	2.51%		
Mireille Maury	DLR	662	1.29%		
Eric Bellet	LO	313	0.61%		
Valid votes		51,454	98.08%	49,848	95.46%
Spoilt and null votes		1,006	1.92%	2,370	4.54%
Votes cast / turnout		52,460	60.17%	52,218	59.95%
Abstentions		34,727	39.83%	34,879	40.05%
Registered voters		87,187	100.00%	87,097	100.00%

=== 2007 ===
Legislative Election 2007: Cher's 3rd constituency
Party	Candidate	Votes	%	±%
UMP	Louis Cosyns	21,706	41.39	
PS	Yann Galut	16,289	31.06	
MoDem	Michel Mrozek	4,493	8.57	
FN	Sabine de Villeroche	2,770	5.28	
DVG	Eliane Pessel	1,403	2.68	
EXG	Marie-Pierre Regnault	1,215	2.32	
LV	Joël Crotte	1,092	2.08	
Others	N/A	3,472		
Turnout		53,748	61.45	
2nd round result
UMP	Louis Cosyns	26,559	50.43	
PS	Yann Galut	26,104	49.57	
Turnout		54,682	62.53	
UMP hold				

=== 2002 ===
Legislative Election 2002: Cher's 3rd constituency
Party	Candidate	Votes	%	±%
PS	Yann Galut	21,043	38.52	
UMP	Louis Cosyns	15,529	28.42	
UDF	Alain Tanton	7,514	13.75	
FN	Sabine de Villeroche	6,088	11.14	
LO	Colette Cordat	1,517	2.78	
PR	Denis Durand	1,166	2.13	
Others	N/A	1,778		
Turnout		56,023	65.50	
2nd round result
UMP	Louis Cosyns	25,825	50.45	
PS	Yann Galut	25,295	49.55	
Turnout		54,047	63.20	
UMP gain from PS				

=== 1997 ===
Legislative Election 1997: Cher's 3rd constituency
Party	Candidate	Votes	%	±%
RPR	Serge Lepeltier	17,615	32.36	
PS	Yann Galut	13,726	25.22	
PCF	Rémy Perrot	8,141	14.96	
FN	François Drougard	6,826	12.54	
MRC	Denis Durand	2,700	4.96	
LO	Colette Cordat	2,261	4.15	
MPF	Henri Deffontaines	1,899	3.49	
DIV	Gisèle Neron	1,264	2.32	
Turnout		58,047	69.20	
2nd round result
PS	Yann Galut	31,553	53.88	
RPR	Serge Lepeltier	27,008	46.12	
Turnout		61,977	73.90	
PS gain from RPR				
