= Guénhaël Huet =

French politician

Member of the National Assembly for Manche's 2nd constituency
- In office 19 June 2007 – 19 June 2017
- Preceded by: René André
- Succeeded by: Bertrand Sorre

Mayor of Avranches
- In office 18 March 2001 – 28 March 2014
- Preceded by: René André
- Succeeded by: David Nicolas

Personal details
- Born: 30 July 1956 (age 70) Locmariaquer, France
- Party: UMP (2007-2015); The Republicans (2015-2017)
- Education: Paris-Panthéon-Assas University

Guénhaël Huet (born 30 July 1956) is a French politician. He was a member of the National Assembly of France from 2007 to 2017, representing Manche's 2nd constituency. He was a member of the Union for a Popular Movement, then the Republicans.
