= Haute-Corse's 1st constituency =

Constituency of the National Assembly of France

1st constituency of Haute-Corse
- inline Constituency of the National Assembly of France

- The two constituencies of Haute-Corse

- Haute-Corse in France
- Deputy: Michel Castellani; FaC
- Department: Haute-Corse
- Cantons: Bastia-1, Bastia-2, Bastia-3, Bastia-4, Bastia-6, Bastia-7, Borgo, Capobianco, La Conca-d'Oro, Le Haut-Nebbio, Sagro-di-Santa-Giulia, San-Martino-di-Lota
- Registered voters: 93,429

The 1st constituency of Haute-Corse is a French legislative constituency in the Haute-Corse département, taking in the most northerly part of Corsica.

== Deputies ==
Election	Member	Party
1988	Émile Zuccarelli	MRG
1993	Émile Zuccarelli	MRG
1997	Émile Zuccarelli	PRS
2002	Émile Zuccarelli	PRG
2007	Sauveur Gandolfi-Scheit	UMP
2012	Sauveur Gandolfi-Scheit	UMP
2017	Michel Castellani	PaC
2022	Michel Castellani	FaC

== Election results ==
=== 2024 ===
Candidate	Party	Alliance	First round		Second round	
Candidate	Party	Alliance	Votes	%	Votes	%
Michel Castellani	FaC	REG	11,962	31.74	24,667	64.33
Jean-Michel Marchal	RN		10,855	28.80	13,677	35.67
Julien Morganti	Ind	DVC	5,436	14.42		
Sacha Bastelica	LFI	NPF	3,353	8.90		
Céline Caravellazi	PRV	DVC	2,045	5.43		
Jean-Baptiste Lucciardi	Ind	REG	1,471	3.90		
Jean-Michel Lamberti	R!		370	0.98		
Olivier Josué	LO		203	0.54		
Valid votes			37,691	97.76	38,344	95.56
Blank votes			499	1.29	1,160	2.89
Null votes			363	0.94	664	1.65
Turnout			38,553	62.07	40,168	64.66
Abstentions			23,557	62.07	21,950	35.er
Registered voters			62,110		62,118	
Result			FaC HOLD			

=== 2022 ===
Legislative Election 2022: Haute-Corse's 1st constituency
Party	Candidate	Votes	%	±%
Femu a Corsica (REG)	Michel Castellani	8,316	33.77	+3.35
DVC	Julien Morganti	3,352	13.61	+5.21
RN	Alexis Fernandez	2,996	12.17	+6.77
PRV (Ensemble)	Jean-François Paoli	2,944	11.96	−8.68
CL	Petru Antone Tomasi	1,818	7.38	N/A
LFI	Dominique Mauny	1,533	6.23	+2.04
PCF	Michel Stefani	1,416	5.75	+0.45
REC	Jean Lamberti	1,179	4.79	N/A
PA	Michel Staelens	646	2.62	−0.27
Others	N/A	424	-	−
Turnout		24,624	40.93	−6.49
2nd round result
Femu a Corsica (REG)	Michel Castellani	13,747	63.12	+2.31
DVC	Julien Morganti	8,032	36.88	N/A
Turnout		21,779	38.39	−10.83
Femu a Corsica hold				

=== 2017 ===
Candidate	Label	First round		Second round	
Candidate	Label	Votes	%	Votes	%
Michel Castellani	REG	8,290	30.42	16,279	60.81
Sauveur Gandolfi-Scheit	LR	5,922	21.73	10,490	39.19
François Orlandi	REM	5,626	20.64		
Julien Morganti	DVG	2,289	8.40		
Michel Stefani	PCF	1,445	5.30		
René Cordoliani	FN	1,200	4.40		
Catherine Laurenti	FI	1,143	4.19		
Florence Juralina	DIV	783	2.87		
Christophe Canioni	EXD	316	1.16		
Romain Padovani	DIV	128	0.47		
Olivier Josué	EXG	112	0.41		
Votes		27,254	100.00	26,769	100.00
Valid votes		27,254	97.80	26,769	92.53
Blank votes		354	1.27	1,315	4.55
Null votes		259	0.93	846	2.92
Turnout		27,867	47.42	28,930	49.22
Abstentions		30,905	52.58	29,842	50.78
Registered voters		58,772		58,772	
Source: Ministry of the Interior

=== 2012 ===
Legislative Election 2012: Haute-Corse 1st - 2nd round
Party	Candidate	Votes	%	±%
UMP	Sauveur Gandolfi-Scheit	13,297	38.07	
Party of the Corsican Nation	Gilles Simeoni	10,906	31.22	
PRG	Jean Zuccarelli	10,728	30.71	
Turnout		35,837	65.57	
UMP hold		Swing		

=== 2007 ===
Legislative Election 2007: Haute-Corse 1st - 2nd round
Party	Candidate	Votes	%	±%
UMP	Sauveur Gandolfi-Scheit	18,481	53.89	
PRG	Émile Zuccarelli	15,812	46.11	
Turnout		35,866	69.57	
UMP hold		Swing		

== Sources ==
- *"Résultats électoraux officiels en France" (in French). 2012.
- "Résultats électoraux officiels en France" (in French). 2007.
- "Résultats électoraux officiels en France" (in French). 2002.
