= Bruno Fuchs (politician) =

French politician (born 1959)

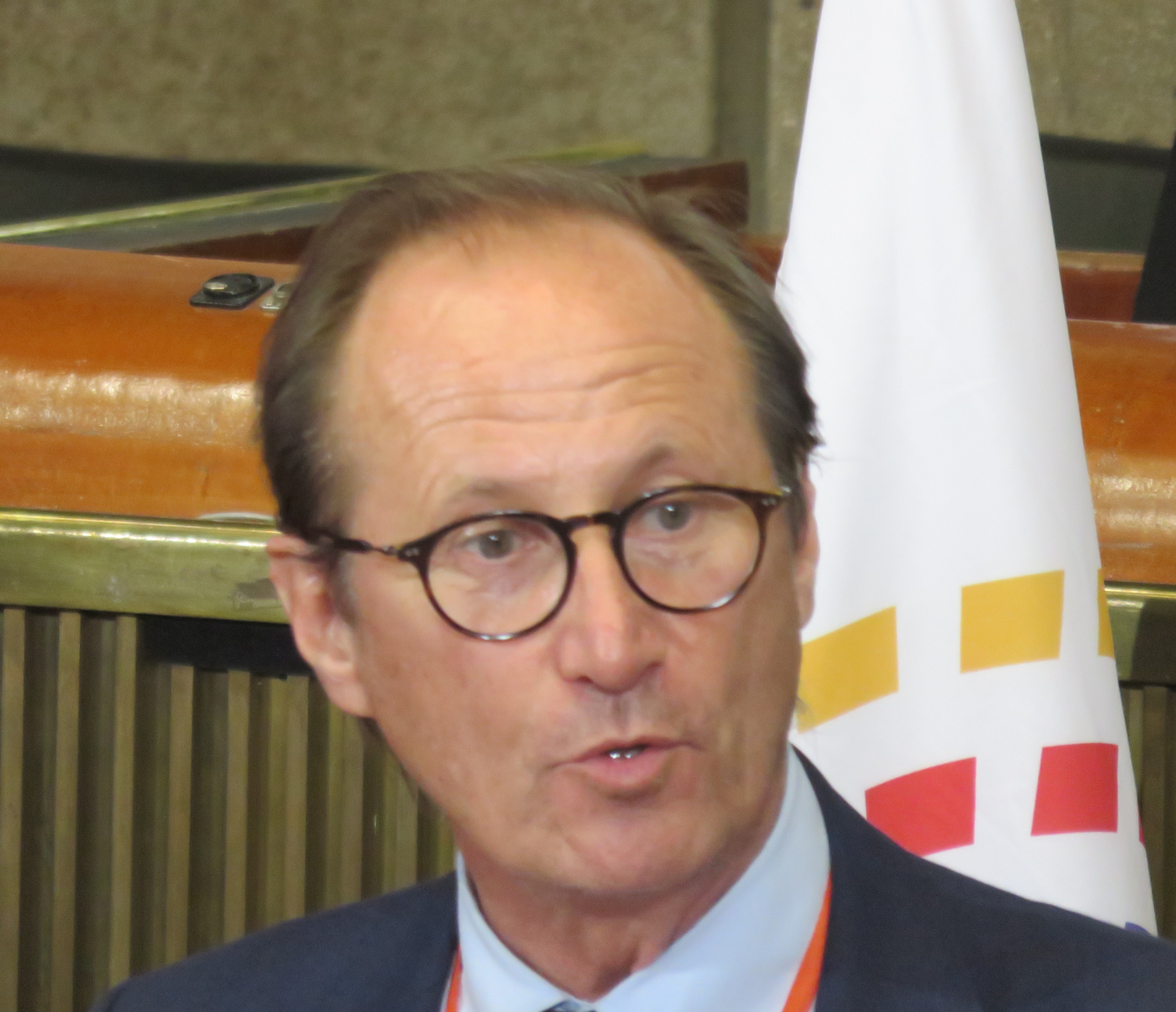
- Fuchs in 2024

President of the Foreign Affairs Committee of the National Assembly
- Incumbent
- Assumed office 9 October 2024
- Preceded by: Jean-Noël Barrot

Member of the National Assembly for Haut-Rhin's 6th constituency
- Incumbent
- Assumed office 21 June 2017
- Preceded by: Francis Hillmeyer

Personal details
- Born: 7 April 1959 (age 67) Colmar, France
- Party: La République En Marche!
- Spouse: Véronique Robert
- Education: ISG Business School

Bruno Fuchs (French pronunciation: [bʁyno fyks]; born 7 April 1959) is a French politician of La République En Marche! (LREM) who has been serving as a member of the French National Assembly since the 2017 elections, representing the department of Haut-Rhin.

== Political career ==
In parliament, Fuchs serves as a member of the Committee on Foreign Affairs and the Committee on European Affairs. He is also a member of the French parliamentary friendship groups with Cuba and Turkey.

In addition to his committee assignments, Fuchs has been a member of the French delegation to the Parliamentary Assembly of the Council of Europe since 2017. In this capacity, he serves on the Committee on Equality and Non-Discrimination.

He was elected to a second term in the 2022 legislative election, winning 55% of the vote in the runoff against National Rally candidate Christelle Ritz.

In the 2024 snap election, he defeated Ritz again in a rematch after left-wing candidate Florence Claudepierre, who had also qualified for the runoff, withdrew to prevent the National Rally from winning the seat.

In October 2024, he was elected to lead Foreign Affairs Committee of the National Assembly after its president Jean-Noël Barrot was appointed as Minister for Europe and Foreign Affairs.

== Political positions ==
In July 2019, Fuchs voted in favour of the French ratification of the European Union’s Comprehensive Economic and Trade Agreement (CETA) with Canada.

== See also ==
- 2017 French legislative election
