= Jean-Pierre Abelin =

French politician

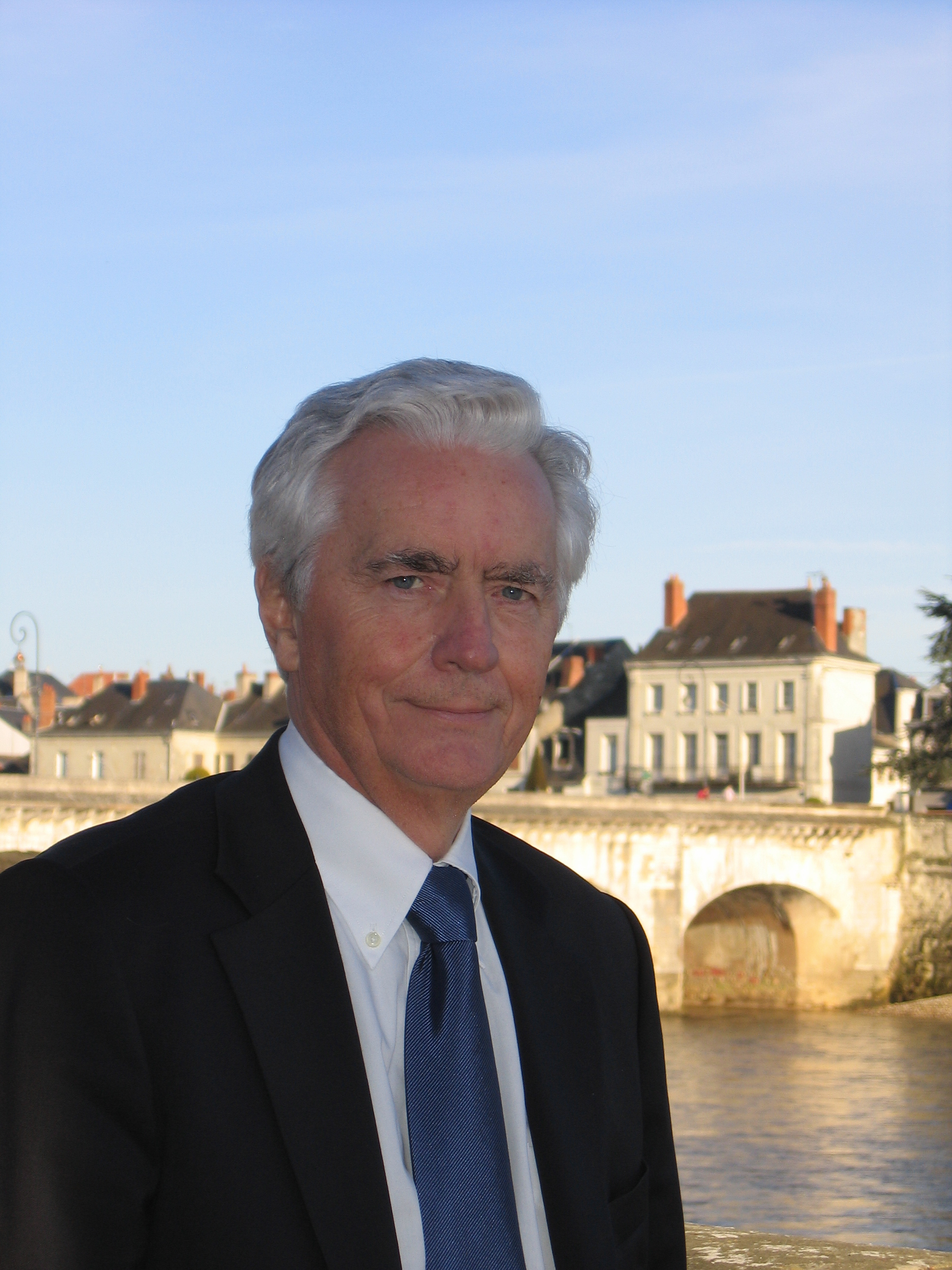

Member of the National Assembly of France for 4th Constituency of Vienne
- In office 2 April 1993 – 19 June 2012
- Preceded by: Guy Monjalon
- Succeeded by: Véronique Massonneau (EELV)

Mayor of Châtellerault
- Incumbent
- Assumed office 16 March 2008
- Preceded by: Joël Tondusson

President of the Communauté d'agglomération du Pays Châtelleraudais

Municipal councillor of Châtellerault
- In office 14 March 1983 – 30 September 2000

Member of the European Parliament
- In office 24 July 1984 – 25 May 1989

Member of the National Assembly of France for 2nd Constituency of Vienne
- In office 1978–1981

Member of the National Assembly of France for Vienne (proportional representation)
- In office 1986–1988

Personal details
- Born: 3 September 1950 (age 75) Poitiers, Vienne, France
- Party: Nouveau Centre

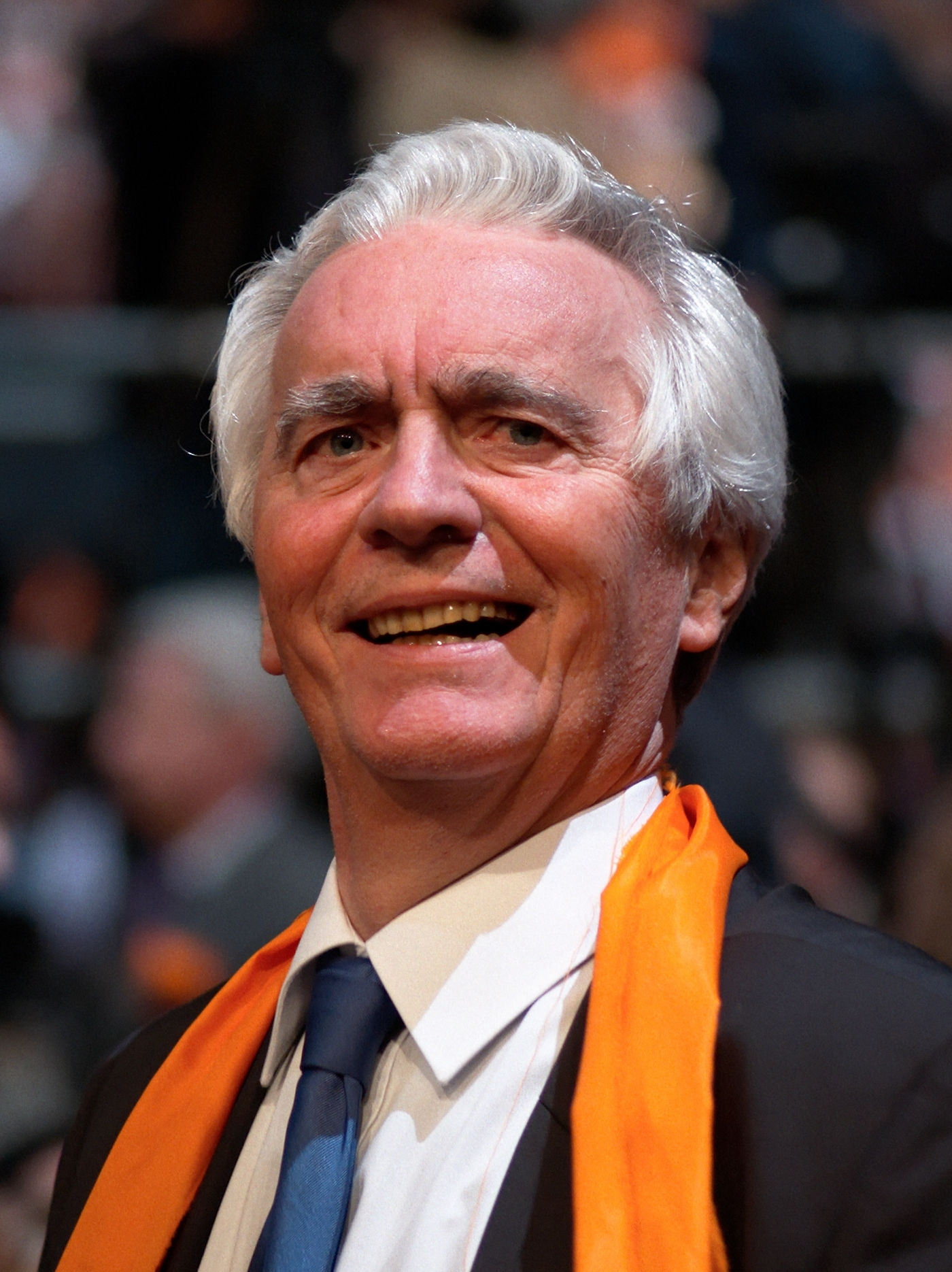
Jean-Pierre Abelin at a rally for François Bayrou, April 18, 2007

Jean-Pierre Abelin (French pronunciation: [ʒɑ̃ pjɛʁ ab(ə)lɛ̃]; born 3 September 1950) is a French politician.

Jean-Pierre Abelin is the son of Pierre Abelin.

== French National Assembly ==
He was a member of the French National Assembly from 1978 to 1981, then 1986 to 1988, and from 1993 to 2012, for various constituencies of Vienne, most recently the 4th constituency.

He was a member of the New Centre.

He was a member of the Economic, Environmental and Regional Planning Committee.

== European Parliament ==
Abelin also was a Member of the European Parliament, between 1984 and 1989, in the European People's Party.
