= Sarthe's 1st constituency =

Constituency of the National Assembly of France

1st constituency of the Sarthe
- inline Constituency of the National Assembly of France

- The constituency in Sarthe
- Deputy: Julie Delpech; RE
- Department: Sarthe
- Cantons: Beaumont-sur-Sarthe, Conlie, Fresnay-sur-Sarthe, Le Mans-Centre, Le Mans-Nord-Ouest, Saint-Paterne, Sillé-le-Guillaume
- Registered voters: 105,947

The 1st constituency of the Sarthe is a French legislative constituency in the Sarthe département.

== Deputies ==
Election	Member	Party
1988	Gérard Chasseguet	RPR
1993	Pierre Hellier	UDF
1997	Pierre Hellier	UDF
2002	Pierre Hellier	UMP
2007	Fabienne Labrette-Ménager	UMP
2012	Françoise Dubois	PS
2017	Damien Pichereau	LREM
2022	Julie Delpech	RE

== Election results ==
=== 2024 ===
Candidate	Party	Alliance	First round		Second round	
Candidate	Party	Alliance	Votes	%	Votes	%
Julie Delpech	REN	Ensemble	15,111	30.84	29,050	60.91
Céline de Cossé Brissac	RN		16,465	33.60	18,646	39.09
Ghislaine Bonnet	LFI	NFP	12,258	25.01		
Clément Coulon	LR		4,459	9.10		
Sylvie Maillet	LO		710	1.45		
Valid votes			49,003	96.78	47,696	94.15
Blank votes			1,213	2.40	2,481	4.90
Null votes			419	0.83	482	0.95
Turnout			50,635	68.64	50,659	68.66
Abstentions			23,131	31,36	23,127	31,34
Registered voters			73,766		73,786	
Result			REN HOLD			

=== 2022 ===
Legislative Election 2022: Sarthe's 1st constituency
Party	Candidate	Votes	%	±%
LREM (Ensemble)	Julie Delpech	8,517	24.75	-6.31
LFI (NUPÉS)	Ghislaine Bonnet	7,903	22.97	-4.82
RN	Edwige Picouleau	6,150	17.87	+7.60
LR (UDC)	Fabienne Fabrette-Menager	6,000	17.44	−7.46
PS	Dylan Benaud*	2,903	8.44	N/A
REC	Brigitte Dujardin	1,247	3.62	N/A
Others	N/A	1,686	4.90	
Turnout		34,406	48.13	−2.40
2nd round result
LREM (Ensemble)	Julie Delpech	17,300	54.90	+4.81
LFI (NUPÉS)	Ghislaine Bonnet	14,213	45.10	N/A
Turnout		31,513	47.40	+9.28
LREM hold				

* PS dissident

=== 2017 ===
Legislative Election 2017: Sarthe's 1st constituency
Party	Candidate	Votes	%	±%
LREM	Damien Pichereau	11,264	31.06	
LR	Christelle Morancais	9,031	24.90	
PS	Françoise Dubois	4,238	11.69	
LFI	Loic Morisot	4,175	11.51	
FN	Marie Genevrey	3,725	10.27	
EELV	Isabelle Severe	1,663	4.59	
Others	N/A	2,172		
Turnout		36,268	50.53	
2nd round result
LREM	Damien Pichereau	13,704	50.09	
LR	Christelle Morancais	13,657	49.91	
Turnout		27,361	38.12	
LREM gain from PS				

=== 2012 ===
Legislative Election 2012: Sarthe's 1st constituency
Party	Candidate	Votes	%	±%
PS	Françoise Dubois	16,477	39.26	
UMP	Fabienne Labrette-Menager	15,859	37.79	
FN	Jean-François Le Gras	4,450	10.60	
FG	Thierry Samain	1,633	3.89	
EELV	Catherine Gouhier	1,454	3.46	
Others	N/A	2,092		
Turnout		41,965	57.83	
2nd round result
PS	Françoise Dubois	21,284	51.76	
UMP	Fabienne Labrette-Menager	19,836	48.24	
Turnout		41,120	56.67	
PS gain from UMP				

=== 2007 ===
Legislative Election 2007: Sarthe 1st - 2nd round
Party	Candidate	Votes	%	±%
UMP	Fabienne Labrette-Ménager	22,156	56.55	
PS	Françoise Dubois	17,025	43.45	
Turnout		40,405	56.55	
UMP hold		Swing		

== Sources ==
- French Interior Ministry results website: "Résultats électoraux officiels en France" (in French).
