= Damien Pichereau =

French politician (born 1988)

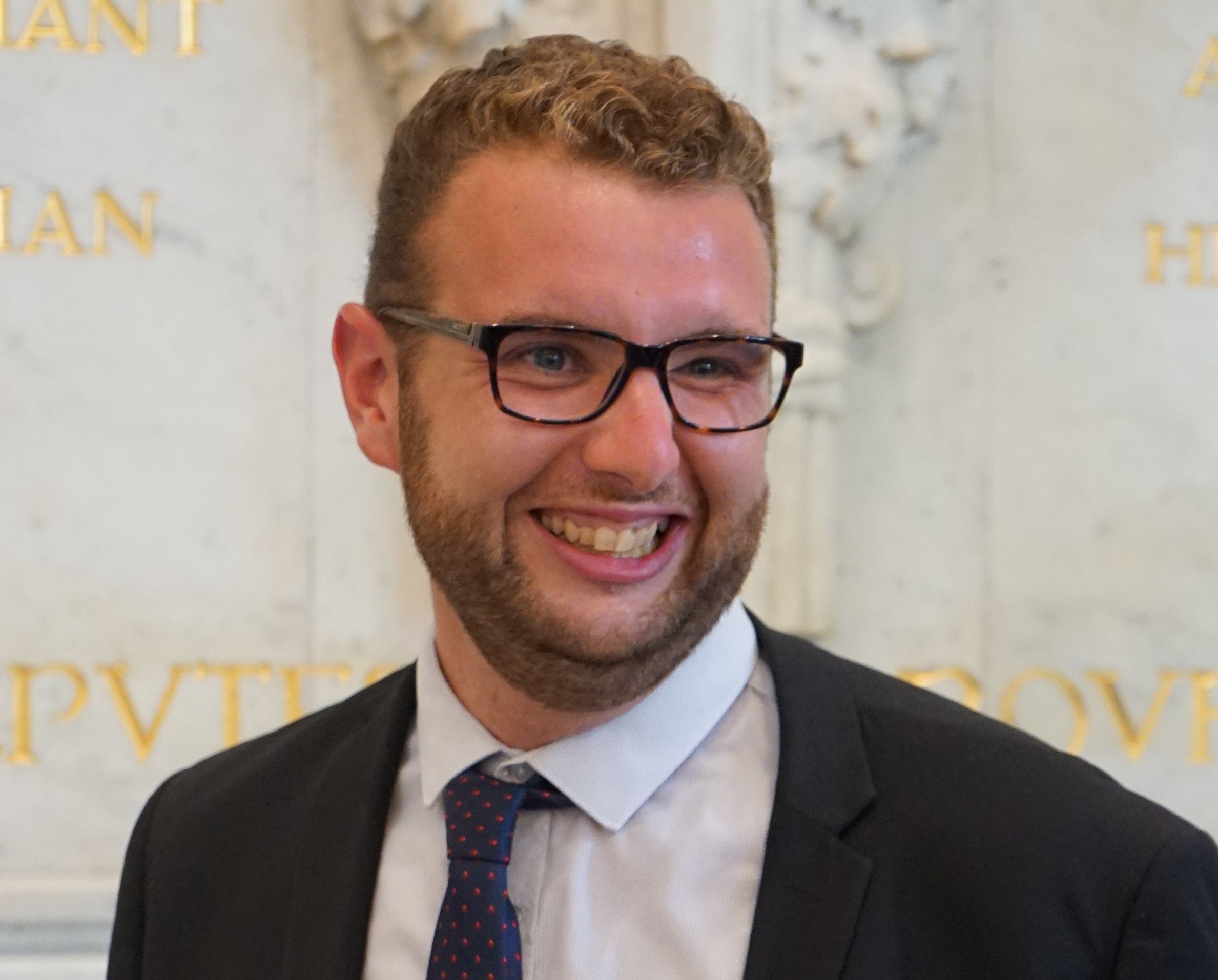
Damien Pichereau (2017).

Damien Pichereau (born 28 January 1988) is a French politician representing La République En Marche! He was elected to the French National Assembly on 18 June 2017, representing the 1st constituency of the department of Sarthe. He did not seek re-election at the 2022 French legislative election. He was succeeded by Julie Delpech.

== See also ==
- 2017 French legislative election
