= Nicolas Turquois =

French politician (born 1972)

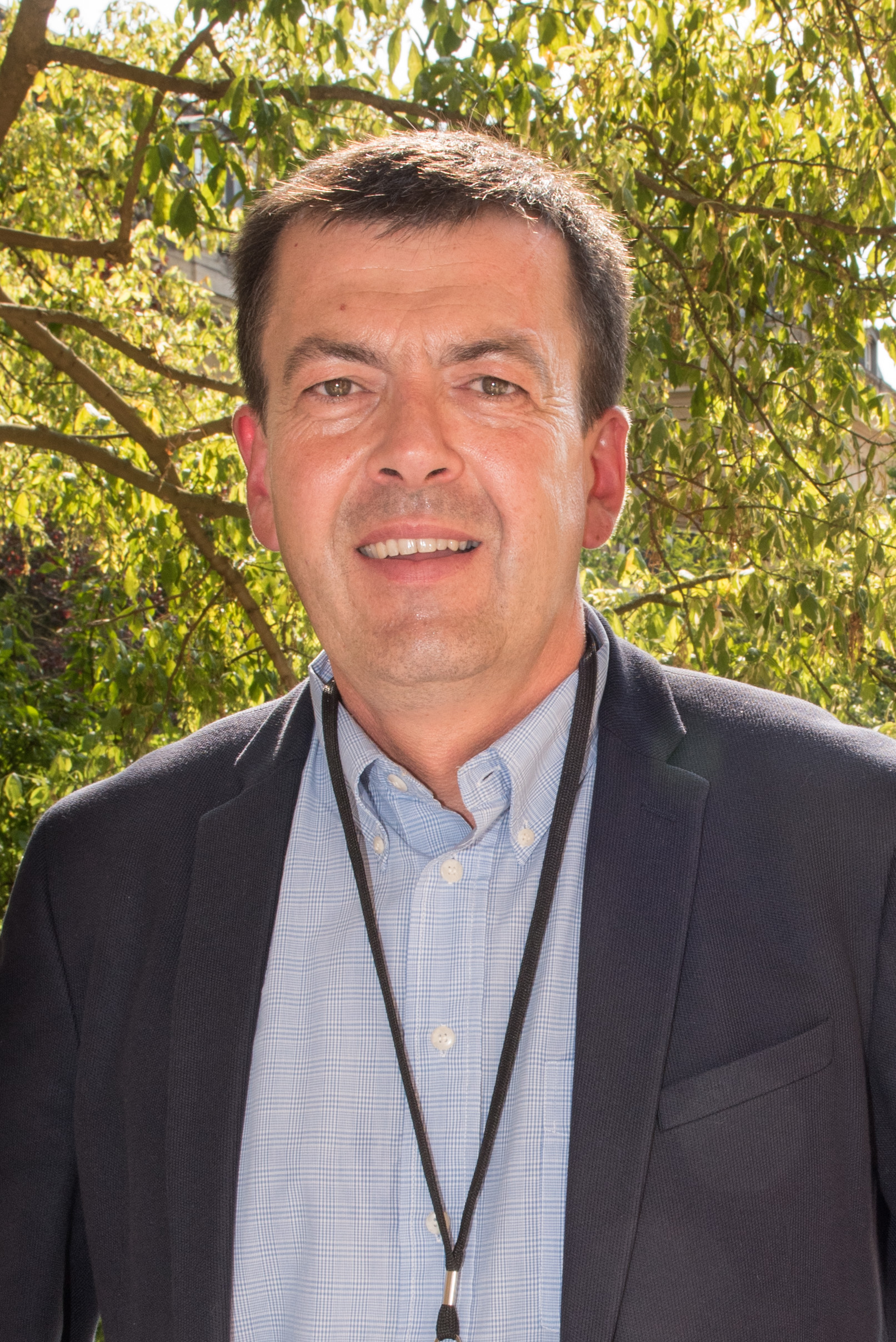

Member of the National Assembly of France for 4th Constituency of Vienne
- Incumbent
- Assumed office 21 June 2017
- Preceded by: Véronique Massonneau

Personal details
- Born: 26 July 1972 (age 53) Tours, France
- Party: MoDem
- Occupation: Politician, farmer

Nicolas Turquois (born 27 July 1972) is a French politician of the Democratic Movement (MoDem) who has been serving as a member of the French National Assembly since the 2017 elections, representing the department of Vienne.

A former farmer and deputy mayor of Ouzilly-Vignolles, Turquois resigned from his post in 2006 after a disagreement with the local president of the Loudun intermunicipal network, after which he joined the Union for French Democracy, which later became MoDem.

In March 2019, Turquois became a member of the French Commission on the Energy transition. Since 2020, he has been serving as his parliamentary group's co-rapporteur on the government's pension reform plans.
