= Sauveur Gandolfi-Scheit =

French politician

Sauveur Gandolfi-Scheit (born 19 January 1947 in Bastia, Haute-Corse) was a member of the National Assembly of France. He represented Haute-Corse's 1st constituency from 2007 to 2017, as a member of the Union for a Popular Movement.
