= Pierre Morange =

French politician

Pierre Morange (born September 8, 1956, at Clermont-Ferrand, in Puy-de-Dôme) is a French politician.

He has been elected deputy of the 6th division of the Yvelines. From February 2, 1999, to June 6, 2002, Morange operated as a deputy of the French National Assembly, becoming re-elected on June 10, 2007.

Pierre Morange runs under the Union for a Popular Movement (UMP), political party of the President of France Nicolas Sarkozy.

From June 25, 1995, to March 18, 2001, he served as Mayor of Chambourcy, in the Yvelines.
