= Francis Hillmeyer =

French politician

Francis Hillmeyer (born September 9, 1946, in Mulhouse, Haut-Rhin) is a member of the National Assembly of France. He represents the Haut-Rhin department, and is a member of the New Centre.
