= List of MPs who lost their seat in the 2024 French legislative election =

This is a list of members of Parliament (MPs) who lost their seat in the 2024 French legislative election. All of these deputies sat in the 16th legislature of the French Fifth Republic but were not returned to the French Parliament in the election.

== List ==
Alliance	Party	Name	Constituency	Year elected	Seat held by party since	Defeated by	Party	Alliance
	Debout la France	Nicolas Dupont-Aignan	Essonne's 8th constituency	1997	1997			
	LFI	Rachel Keke	Val-de-Marne's 7th constituency	2022	2022	Vincent Jeanbrun	LR	
	LR	Pierre-Henri Dumont	Pas-de-Calais's 7th constituency	2017	2017	Marc de Fleurian	RN	LR-RN
Ensemble	MoDEM	Sarah El Haïry	Loire-Atlantique's 5th constituency	2017	2017	Fabrice Roussel	PS	NFP
Ensemble	LREM	Marjolaine Meynier-Millefert	Isère's 10th constituency	2017	2017	Thierry Perez	RN	LR-RN
Ensemble	LREM	Damien Adam	Seine-Maritime's 1st constituency	2017	2017	Florence Hérouin-Léautey	PS	NFP

== See also ==
- List of MPs who lost their seat in the 2022 French legislative election
