= Results of the 2024 French legislative election in Seine-Maritime =

2024 French legislative election in Seine-Maritime
← 2022	30 June 2024 (first round); 7 July 2024 (second round)	Next →

All 10 Seine-Maritime seats to the National Assembly
- Turnout: 67.67% (▲18.8 pp) (1st round); 67.68% (▲20.7 pp) (2nd round)
Alliance	NFP	Ensemble
Last election	5	5
Seats won	5	3
Seat change	Steady	▼2
1st round %	178,687; 30.81% ▲1.15%	132,504; 22.85% ▼3.86%
2nd round %	165,918; 29.48% ▼10.69%	156,157; 27.75% ▼3.79%
	Third party	Fourth party
Party	RN	LR/LC
Last election	0	0
Seats won	2	0
Seat change	▲2	Steady
1st round %	214,320; 36.96% ▲13.91%	34,531; 5.95% ▲0.24%
2nd round %	240,654; 42.77% ▲14.47%

Following the first round of the 2024 French legislative election on 30 June 2024, runoff elections in each constituency where no candidate received a vote share greater than 50 percent were scheduled for 7 July. Candidates permitted to stand in the runoff elections needed to either come in first or second place in the first round or achieve more than 12.5 percent of the votes of the entire electorate (as opposed to 12.5 percent of the vote share due to low turnout).

== Seine-Maritime ==
=== 1st constituency ===
Candidate	Party or alliance		First round		Second round	
Candidate	Party or alliance		Votes	%	Votes	%
Florence Herouin-Léautey	New Popular Front	Socialist Party	20,040	44.44	22,790	51.23
Damien Adam	Ensemble	Renaissance	12,456	27.62	12,690	28.52
Grégoire Houdan	National Rally		8,567	19.00	9,009	20.25
Patrick Chabert	Miscellaneous right	The Republicans	2,606	5.78		
Christian Savey	Reconquête		465	1.03		
Valérie Foissey	Far-left	Lutte Ouvrière	454	1.01		
Marie-Hélène Duverger	Far-left	Independent	271	0.60		
Jody Horcholle	Miscellaneous centre	Ecologists	122	0.27		
Richard Vacquer	Miscellaneous left	Independent	111	0.25		
Mikhail Stachkov	Independent		3	0.01		
Total			45,095	100.00	44,489	100.00
Valid votes			45,095	98.27	44,489	97.89
Invalid votes			208	0.45	248	0.55
Blank votes			585	1.27	709	1.56
Total votes			45,888	100.00	45,446	100.00
Registered voters/turnout			66,601	68.90	66,621	68.22

=== 2nd constituency ===
Candidate	Party or alliance		First round		Second round	
Candidate	Party or alliance		Votes	%	Votes	%
Vanessa Lancelot	National Rally		23,135	33.77	26,594	40.08
Annie Vidal	Ensemble	Renaissance	18,996	27.73	39,754	59.92
Vincent Decorde	New Popular Front	Socialist Party	16,753	24.46		
Jonas Haddad	The Republicans		7,429	10.85		
Jean-Claude Garault	Far-left	Lutte Ouvrière	877	1.28		
Marie-Françoise Accard	Sovereigntist right	Independent	666	0.97		
Frédéric Mazier	Reconquête		643	0.94		
Soren Petiot	Miscellaneous left	Independent	0	0.00		
Total			68,499	100.00	66,348	100.00
Valid votes			68,499	97.65	66,348	95.22
Invalid votes			386	0.55	655	0.94
Blank votes			1,266	1.80	2,679	3.84
Total votes			70,151	100.00	69,682	100.00
Registered voters/turnout			95,776	73.24	95,777	72.75

=== 3rd constituency ===
Candidate	Party or alliance		First round		Second round	
Candidate	Party or alliance		Votes	%	Votes	%
Edouard Benard	New Popular Front	Communist Party	21,000	48.64	27,329	66.88
Pauline Daniel	National Rally		12,194	28.24	13,533	33.12
Annie Vidal	Ensemble	Horizons	5,951	13.78		
Alexis Coppein	Miscellaneous right	The Republicans	2,757	6.39		
Pascal Le Manach	Far-left	Lutte Ouvrière	705	1.63		
Anthony Vanhese	Reconquête		566	1.31		
Total			43,173	100.00	40,862	100.00
Valid votes			43,173	97.56	40,862	93.52
Invalid votes			299	0.68	608	1.39
Blank votes			781	1.76	2,224	5.09
Total votes			44,253	100.00	43,694	100.00
Registered voters/turnout			70,623	62.66	70,633	61.86

=== 4th constituency ===
Candidate	Party or alliance		First round		Second round	
Candidate	Party or alliance		Votes	%	Votes	%
Guillaume Pennelle	National Rally		20,748	39.08	23,693	47.49
Alma Dufour	New Popular Front	La France Insoumise	17,335	32.65	26,194	52.51
Laurent Bonnaterre	Ensemble	Horizons	13,120	24.71		
Frédéric Podguszer	Far-left	Lutte Ouvrière	1,152	2.17		
Ingrid Losfeld	Reconquête		736	1.39		
Total			53,091	100.00	49,887	100.00
Valid votes			53,091	97.13	49,887	91.21
Invalid votes			420	0.77	1,041	1.90
Blank votes			1,146	2.10	3,764	6.88
Total votes			54,657	100.00	54,692	100.00
Registered voters/turnout			86,287	63.34	86,229	63.43

=== 5th constituency ===
Candidate	Party or alliance		First round		Second round	
Candidate	Party or alliance		Votes	%	Votes	%
Jean-Cyril Montier	National Rally		21,281	33.36	29,908	48.32
Gérard Leseul	New Popular Front	Socialist Party	26,406	41.40	31,994	51.68
Jean Delalandre	Ensemble	Horizons	14,259	22.35		
Simon Sulkowski	Far-left	Lutte Ouvrière	963	1.51		
Jean-Marc Bled	Reconquête		880	1.38		
Total			63,789	100.00	61,902	100.00
Valid votes			63,789	97.67	61,902	94.32
Invalid votes			367	0.56	771	1.17
Blank votes			1,156	1.77	2,955	4.50
Total votes			65,312	100.00	65,628	100.00
Registered voters/turnout			94,874	68.84	94,907	69.15

=== 6th constituency ===
Candidate	Party or alliance		First round		Second round	
Candidate	Party or alliance		Votes	%	Votes	%
Patrice Martin	National Rally		32,235	44.91	36,281	51.21
Sébastien Jumel	New Popular Front	Communist Party	24,763	34.50	34,571	48.79
Stéphane Accard	The Republicans		12,916	17.99		
Olivier Cleland	Reconquête		1,009	1.41		
Éric Moisan	Far-left	Lutte Ouvrière	861	1.20		
Total			71,784	100.00	70,852	100.00
Valid votes			71,784	97.37	70,852	94.44
Invalid votes			500	0.68	884	1.18
Blank votes			1,436	1.95	3,287	4.38
Total votes			73,720	100.00	75,023	100.00
Registered voters/turnout			109,261	67.47	109,275	68.66

=== 7th constituency ===
Candidate	Party or alliance		First round		Second round	
Candidate	Party or alliance		Votes	%	Votes	%
Agnès Firmin Le Bodo	Ensemble	Horizons	19,734	34.83	36,050	66.18
Anaïs Thomas	National Rally		16,221	28.63	18,423	33.82
Florence Martin Péréon	New Popular Front	Socialist Party	16,211	28.62		
Jacques Forestier	The Republicans		1,489	2.63		
Catherine Omont	Miscellaneous left	Independent	1,292	2.28		
Jean-Paul Macé	Far-left	Lutte Ouvrière	610	1.08		
Isabelle Ducoeurjoly	Reconquête		553	0.98		
Véronique De La Brosse	Sovereigntist right	Independent	541	0.95		
Total			56,651	100.00	54,473	100.00
Valid votes			56,651	97.36	54,473	94.35
Invalid votes			119	0.20	253	0.44
Blank votes			1,419	2.44	3,009	5.21
Total votes			58,189	100.00	57,735	100.00
Registered voters/turnout			85,533	68.03	85,544	67.49

=== 8th constituency ===
Candidate	Party or alliance		First round		Second round	
Candidate	Party or alliance		Votes	%	Votes	%
Jean-Paul Lecoq	New Popular Front	Communist Party	16,205	42.81	23,040	63.08
Isabelle Le Coz	Union of the far right	The Republicans	11,855	31.32	13,485	36.92
Régis Debons	Ensemble	Horizons	8,040	21.24		
Benoît Naous	The Republicans		1,245	3.29		
Magali Cauchois	Far-left	Lutte Ouvrière	504	1.33		
Total			37,849	100.00	36,525	100.00
Valid votes			37,849	97.44	36,525	93.69
Invalid votes			41	0.11	86	0.22
Blank votes			955	2.46	2,373	6.09
Total votes			38,845	100.00	38,984	100.00
Registered voters/turnout			64,476	60.25	64,491	60.45

=== 9th constituency ===
Candidate	Party or alliance		First round		Second round	
Candidate	Party or alliance		Votes	%	Votes	%
Douglas Potier	National Rally		28,528	44.58	31,122	49.66
Marie-Agnès Poussier-Winsback	Ensemble	Horizons	20,528	32.08	31,548	50.34
Christiane Rouxel	New Popular Front	La France Insoumise	11,845	18.51		
René Pinato	Far-left	Lutte Ouvrière	1,122	1.75		
Patrick Bucourt	Sovereigntist right	Debout la France	967	1.51		
Christophe Ros	Reconquête		615	0.96		
Aude de Castet	Miscellaneous centre	Independent	392	0.61		
Solène Morel	Miscellaneous left	Independent	1	0.00		
Total			63,998	100.00	62,670	100.00
Valid votes			63,998	97.03	62,670	94.97
Invalid votes			408	0.62	785	1.19
Blank votes			1,553	2.35	2,534	3.84
Total votes			65,959	100.00	65,989	100.00
Registered voters/turnout			95,433	69.12	95,448	69.14

=== 10th constituency ===
Candidate	Party or alliance		First round		Second round	
Candidate	Party or alliance		Votes	%	Votes	%
Robert Le Bourgeois	National Rally		34,431	45.29	38,606	51.67
Xavier Batut	Ensemble	Horizons	19,420	25.55	36,115	48.33
Handy Barré	New Popular Front	Communist Party	13,254	17.44		
Jean-Nicolas Rousseau	Miscellaneous right	Independent	6,089	8.01		
Alain Rivière	Far-left	Lutte Ouvrière	1,033	1.36		
Nicolas Dumas	Reconquête		901	1.19		
Rémy Lecuyer	Sovereigntist right	Debout la France	890	1.17		
Total			76,018	100.00	74,721	100.00
Valid votes			76,018	97.06	74,721	95.13
Invalid votes			607	0.78	853	1.09
Blank votes			1,694	2.16	2,971	3.78
Total votes			78,319	100.00	78,545	100.00
Registered voters/turnout			100,885	77.63	110,887	70.83
