= Michel Menard =

Michel Menard or Michel Ménard may refer to:

- Michel Ménard (born 1961), member of the National Assembly of France
- Michel Branamour Menard (1805-1856), Canadian-born trader and founder of Galveston, Texas
