= Alma Dufour =

French politician (born 1990)

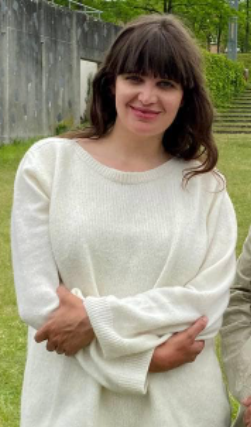
- Alma Dufour in 2022.

Member of the National Assembly for Seine-Maritime's 4th constituency
- Incumbent
- Assumed office 22 June 2022
- Preceded by: Sira Sylla

Personal details
- Born: 6 May 1990 (age 36) Auch, Gers, France
- Party: La France Insoumise; NFP
- Education: Paris 1 Panthéon-Sorbonne University; AgroParisTech

Alma Dufour (French pronunciation: [alma dyfuʁ]; born 6 May 1990) is a French politician. She is a member of the France Insoumise party and has been a Member of Parliament for 4th electoral district for the Seine Maritime department of France since 2022.

== Biography ==
=== Youth and early career ===
Dufour was born on 6 May 1990 in Auch, Gers. She grew up in the 20th arrondissement of Paris, where her parents lived in low-income housing.

In 2012, she graduated with a law degree from Paris-Panthéon-Sorbonne University, which she completed with a master's degree in geopolitics, then in environmental sciences at AgroParisTech until 2015. She earned her living as an employee of Suez, then as a waitress, while working for the European Environmental Bureau (EEB) in Brussels on the circular economy (Negotiation of the Waste Framework Directive).

=== Environmental commitments ===
In 2015, during COP21 in Paris, she joined the Alternatiba/Action non-violente COP21 movement. She was then hired by Friends of the Earth France, and went on to become spokesperson for this NGO from 2017 to January 2021. From late 2018, Alma Dufour took part in the Yellow Vests movement, during which she was the victim of police violence.

Alongside this activism, Alma Dufour has also carried out institutional lobbying. Under her impetus, Friends of the Earth supported local struggles against a dozen Amazon mega-warehouse projects in France, including the Petit-Couronne project in Seine-Maritime. It was involved in actions to block Amazon sites and occupied the land of future projects between 2019 and 2022 until the multinational abandoned five of these warehouse projects. She also highlighted the study by economists Ano Kuhanathan and Florence Mouradian, which argued that e-commerce multinationals are responsible for the loss of 82,000 jobs in France.

Following her experience in the fight against Amazon, Alma Dufour decided to specialize in the interaction between ecology and employment. She combatted the idea that ecology could be a cause of job destruction, and also fought against the relocation of activities. She is an active member of the Plus Jamais ça! (Never Again) collective, which brings together Greenpeace, Friends of the Earth, ATTAC and trade unions: CGT, Confédération paysanne, Solidaires, FSU.

=== Member of Parliament ===
In January 2021, she decided to leave her position as campaign manager and spokesperson for Friends of the Earth to join La France Insoumise and to support Jean-Luc Mélenchon's presidential campaign.

In May 2022, she was nominated as candidate for NUPES, in the fourth constituency of Seine-Maritime, and was elected deputy. She becomes a member of the National Assembly's Finance Committee.

Within LFI, she has been in charge of communications, public engagement, and mobilisation efforts since December 2022.

In the 2024 July snap election, she was re-elected as the NFP candidate in Seine-Maritime's fourth constitucency. Seating again in the LFI group, she is a member of the National Assembly's National Defence and Armed Forces Committee.
