= Seine-Maritime's 4th constituency =

Constituency of the National Assembly of France

4th constituency of Seine-Maritime
- inline Constituency of the National Assembly of France

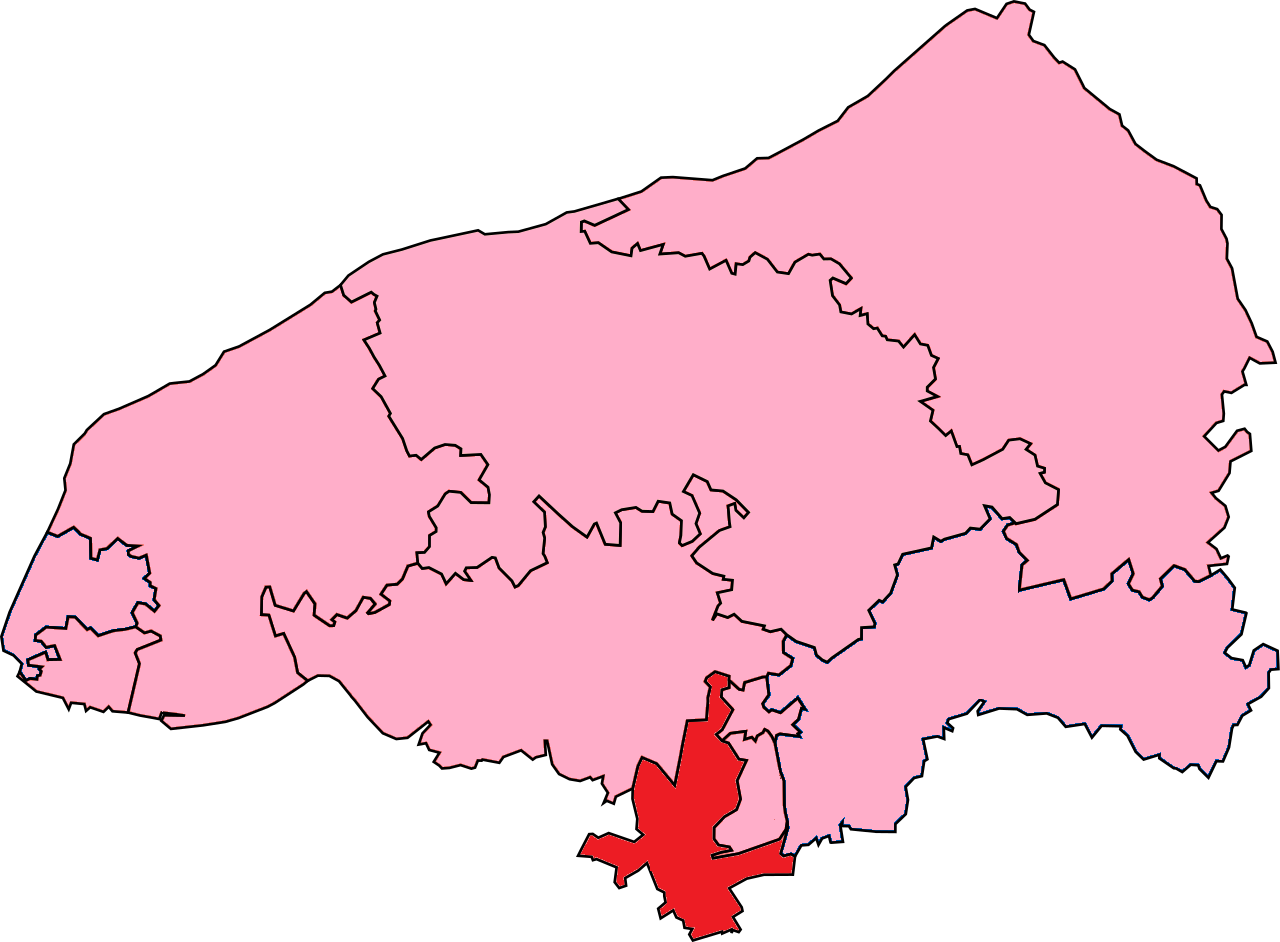
- Seine-Maritime's 4th Constituency shown within Seine-Maritime
- Deputy: Alma Dufour; LFI
- Department: Seine-Maritime
- Cantons: Caudebec-lès-Elbeuf, Elbeuf, Grand-Couronne, Le Grand-Quevilly, Maromme
- Registered voters: 88359

The 4th constituency of the Seine-Maritime (French: Quatrième circonscription de la Seine-Maritime) is a French legislative constituency in the Seine-Maritime département. Like the other 576 French constituencies, it elects one MP using the two-round system, with a run-off if no candidate receives over 50% of the vote in the first round.

== Description ==
The 4th Constituency of the Seine-Maritime covers some southern suburbs of Rouen the largest of which being Le Grand-Quevilly. The seat also includes the town of Elbeuf which is separated from the city by the now much reduced ancient Forest of Rouvray.

Between its creation in its current form in 1988 until 2017 the seat was a bastion of the centre left Socialist Party. It returned former Prime Minister, President of the National Assembly and Foreign Minister Laurent Fabius at every election between 1988 and 2007.

At the 2017 election the PS incumbent Guillaume Bachelay trailed in third place behind both the La République En Marche! and National Front candidates.

== Assembly Members ==
Election	Member	Party	Notes
1958	André Marie	SE	
1962	André Chérasse	UNR	
1967	Colette Privat	PCF	
1968	Olivier de Sarnez	UDR	
1973	André Martin	MR	
1978	Colette Privat	PCF	
1981	Jean-Claude Bateux	PS	
1986	Proportional representation by department		
1988	Laurent Fabius	PS	
1993	Laurent Fabius	PS	
1997	Laurent Fabius	PS	
2002	Laurent Fabius	PS	
2007	Laurent Fabius	PS	
2012	Guillaume Bachelay	PS	
2017	Sira Sylla	LREM	
2022	Alma Dufour	LFI	

== Election results ==
=== 2024 ===
Legislative Election 2024: Seine-Maritime's 4th constituency
Party	Candidate	Votes	%	±%
RN	Guillaume Pennelle	20,748	39.08	+13.12
HOR (Ensemble)	Laurent Bonnaterre	13,120	24.71	N/A
LFI (NFP)	Alma Dufour	17,335	32.65	+8.75
REC	Ingrid Losfeld	736	1.39	−2.76
LO	Frédéric Podguszer	1,152	2.17	N/A
Turnout		53,091	97.13	+51.22
Registered electors		86,287		
2nd round result
LFI	Alma Dufour	26,194	52.51	−1.21
RN	Guillaume Pennelle	23,693	47.49	+1.21
Turnout		49,887	91.21	+47.51
Registered electors		86,229		
LFI hold		Swing		

=== 2022 ===
Legislative Election 2022: Seine-Maritime's 4th constituency
Party	Candidate	Votes	%	±%
RN	Guillaume Pennelle	10,105	25.96	+6.71
LFI (NUPÉS)	Alma Dufour	9,303	23.90	-18.85
PS	Djoudé Merabet*	9,136	23.47	N/A
LREM (Ensemble)	Sira Sylla	7,004	17.99	−7.94
REC	Eve Froger	1,615	4.15	N/A
DIV	Jennifer Jezequel	1,017	2.61	N/A
Others	N/A	746		
Turnout		39,998	45.91	−1.54
2nd round result
LFI (NUPÉS)	Alma Dufour	17,764	53.72	N/A
RN	Guillaume Pennelle	15,301	46.28	+7.01
Turnout		33,065	43.70	+2.89
LFI gain from LREM				

* PS dissident

=== 2017 ===
Legislative Election 2017: Seine-Maritime's 4th constituency
Party	Candidate	Votes	%	±%
LREM	Sira Sylla	10,588	25.93	N/A
FN	Nicolas Goury	7,861	19.25	+0.89
PS	Guillaume Bachelay	7,738	18.95	−33.86
LFI	Laura Thieblemont	5,576	13.65	N/A
PCF	Patrice Dupray	3,219	7.88	−2.70
LR	Marie-Hélène Roux	3,004	7.36	N/A
EELV	David Cormand	928	2.27	−0.14
Others	N/A	1,926		
Turnout		41,926	47.45	−7.82
2nd round result
LREM	Sira Sylla	19,271	60.73	N/A
FN	Nicolas Goury	12,461	39.27	N/A
Turnout		36,060	40.81	N/A
LREM gain from PS		Swing		

=== 2012 ===
Legislative Election 2012: Seine-Maritime's 4th constituency
Party	Candidate	Votes	%	±%
PS	Laurent Fabius	25,978	52.81	+2.94
FN	Nicolas Bay	9,029	18.36	+13.84
NM	Franck Meyer	6,910	14.05	N/A
FG	Patrice Dupray	5,206	10.58	+3.63
EELV	Claire Lutz	1,183	2.41	+0.30
Others	N/A	881		
Turnout		49,187	55.27	−5.70
PS hold				

=== 2007 ===
Legislative Election 2007: Seine-Maritime's 4th constituency
Party	Candidate	Votes	%	±%
PS	Laurent Fabius	21,599	49.87	+0.80
UMP	Marie-Hélène Roux	11,000	25.40	+3.88
PCF	Patrice Dupray	3,010	6.95	−0.36
MoDem	Régine Marre	2,069	4.78	N/A
FN	Jean-Luc Bigot	1,959	4.52	−7.82
Far left	Zahia Ait Bachir	959	2.21	N/A
LV	Françoise Lesconnec	915	2.11	−0.97
Others	N/A	1,800		
Turnout		44,164	60.97	−2.18
2nd round result
PS	Laurent Fabius	27,536	67.54	+4.39
UMP	Marie-Hélène Roux	13,236	32.46	−4.39
Turnout		42,076	58.09	+0.79
PS hold				

=== 2002 ===
Legislative Election 2002: Seine-Maritime's 4th constituency
Party	Candidate	Votes	%	±%
PS	Laurent Fabius	21,079	49.07	+7.34
UMP	Marie-Hélène Roux	9,244	21.52	N/A
FN	Alain Garant	5,300	12.34	−5.51
PCF	Patrice Dupray	3,139	7.31	−5.46
LV	Claire Dumontier	1,321	3.08	+0.42
LCR	Regis Louail	955	2.22	N/A
Others	N/A	1,920		
Turnout		44,071	63.15	−7.83
2nd round result
PS	Laurent Fabius	26,064	68.15	−4.76
UMP	Marie-Hélène Roux	12,183	31.85	N/A
Turnout		39,979	57.30	−13.51
PS hold				

=== 1997 ===
Legislative Election 1997: Seine-Maritime's 4th constituency
Party	Candidate	Votes	%	±%
PS	Laurent Fabius	19,525	41.73	
FN	Guillaume de Tarle	8,353	17.85	
UDF	Eric Reboli	6,500	13.89	
PCF	Patrice Dupray	5,976	12.77	
GE	Daniel Doare	1,501	3.21	
LV	Jean-Pierre Girod	1,243	2.66	
LO	Jean-Luc Robin	1,214	2.59	
Others	N/A	2,476		
Turnout		48,964	70.98	
2nd round result
PS	Laurent Fabius	31,615	72.91	
FN	Guillaume de Tarle	11,749	27.09	
Turnout		48,820	70.81	
PS hold				
