= Sira Sylla =

French politician

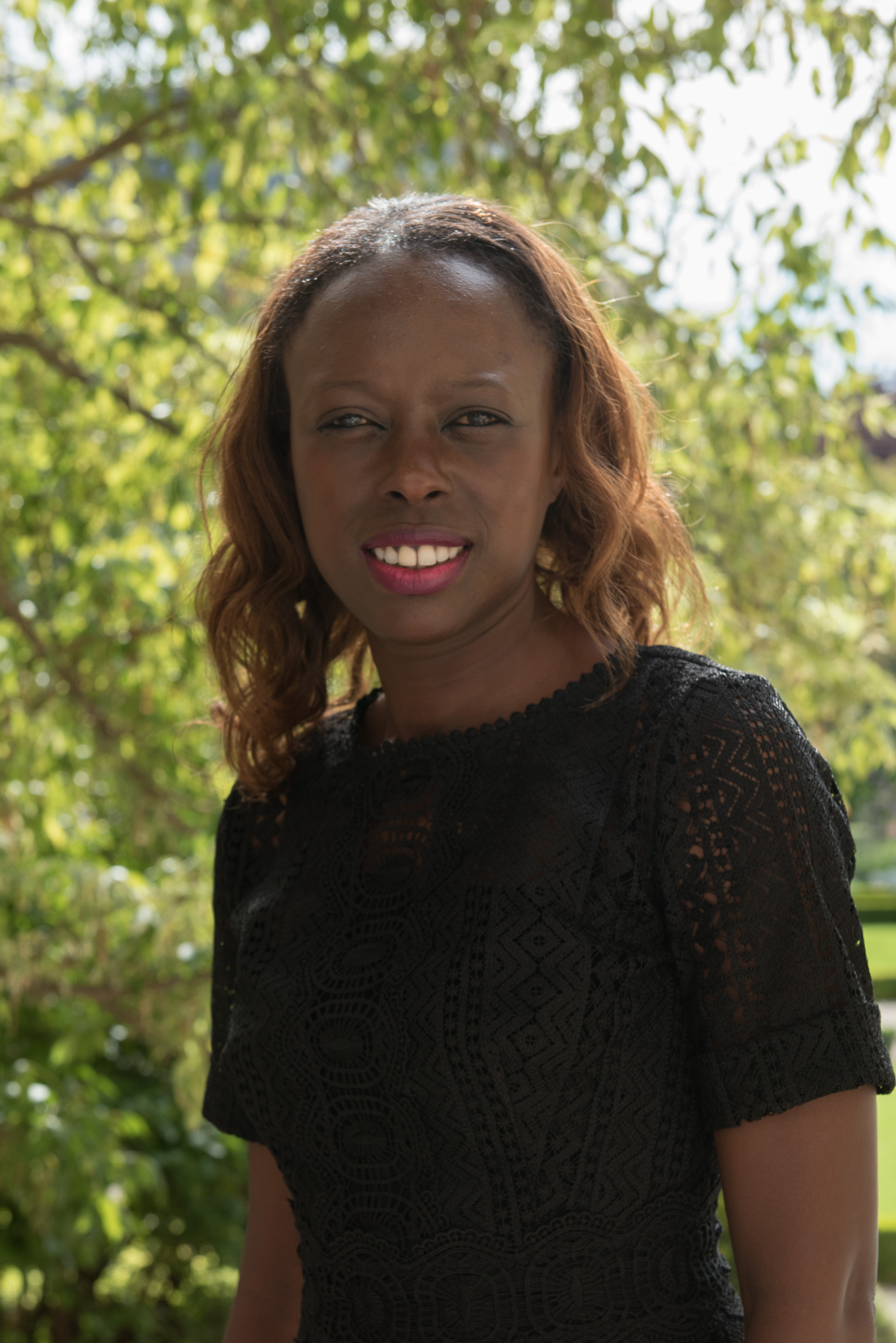
- Sira Sylla in June 2017

Member of the National Assembly for Seine-Maritime's 4th constituency
- In office 21 June 2017 – June 2022
- Preceded by: Guillaume Bachelay
- Succeeded by: Alma Dufour

Personal details
- Born: 14 March 1980 (age 46) Rouen, France
- Party: La République En Marche!
- Education: University of Rouen

Sira Sylla (born 14 March 1980) is a French politician of La République En Marche! (LREM) who served as a member of the French National Assembly from 2017 to 2022, representing the department of Seine-Maritime.

== Political career ==
In parliament, Sylla served as member of the Committee on Foreign Affairs. In addition to her committee assignments, she was part of the parliamentary friendship groups with the Burundi, Rwanda, Senegal and Turkey. In July 2019, Sylla voted in favour of the French ratification of the European Union’s Comprehensive Economic and Trade Agreement (CETA) with Canada.

Sylla lost her seat in the 2022 French legislative election, coming in fourth place in the first round.

== See also ==
- 2017 French legislative election
