= Pierre Albertini (politician) =

French politician

Mayor of Rouen
- In office 25 March 2001 – 15 March 2008
- Preceded by: Yvon Robert
- Succeeded by: Valérie Fourneyron

Mayor of Mont-Saint-Aignan
- In office 13 June 1980 – 18 March 2001
- Preceded by: Alain Brajeux
- Succeeded by: Françoise Guégot

Member of the National Assembly for Seine-Maritime's 2nd constituency
- In office 2 April 1993 – 20 June 2007
- Preceded by: Dominique Gambier
- Succeeded by: Françoise Guégot

Personal details
- Born: 22 November 1944 (age 81) Batna, Algeria
- Party: UDF
- Education: University of Caen; University of Rouen
- Profession: Jurist

Pierre Albertini (born 22 November 1944) was the mayor of Rouen, France between 2001 and 2008 and a former deputy to the National Assembly of France (1993–2007), both on behalf of the Union for French Democracy.
