= Alfred Trassy-Paillogues =

French politician

Alfred Trassy-Paillogues (born 15 July 1950 in Rouen) is a member of the National Assembly of France. He represents the Seine-Maritime department, and is a member of the Union for a Popular Movement.

== Biography ==
Alfred Trassy-Paillogues was born on July 15, 1950, in Rouen.He studied at the Thomas Corneille high school in Barentin and the Pierre-Corneille high school in Rouen, in the Seine-Maritime department, then in Paris at the École nationale des ponts et chaussées, where he obtained a degree in civil engineering.

Head of a public works company until 1993, he began his political career in 1982 by becoming a general councilor for the canton of Yerville in Seine-Maritime. A year later, he was elected mayor of the municipality of Yerville.

Elected to the Haute-Normandie Regional Council in 1986, he served there until 1993, when he became a member of parliament for the tenth Seine-Maritime's 10th constituency.

At the same time, he continued his work with the Commission for Economic Development, Ports, Tourism, and European Affairs, which he had chaired since 1994 within the Departmental Council of Seine-Maritime, and was entrusted until March 2004 with responsibility for Seine-Maritime Expansion, the department's secular arm for business support and local development.

Defeated in 1997 by the socialist Gérard Fuchs, he was re-elected as deputy for the tenth Seine-Maritime's 10th constituency on June 16, 2002, and re-elected in June 2007 with over 55% of the vote.

In the National Assembly (France), he was a member of the Union for a Popular Movement group.

He was narrowly defeated in the second round of the legislative elections on June 17, 2012, by Socialist candidate Dominique Chauvel.
