= Damien Adam =

French politician

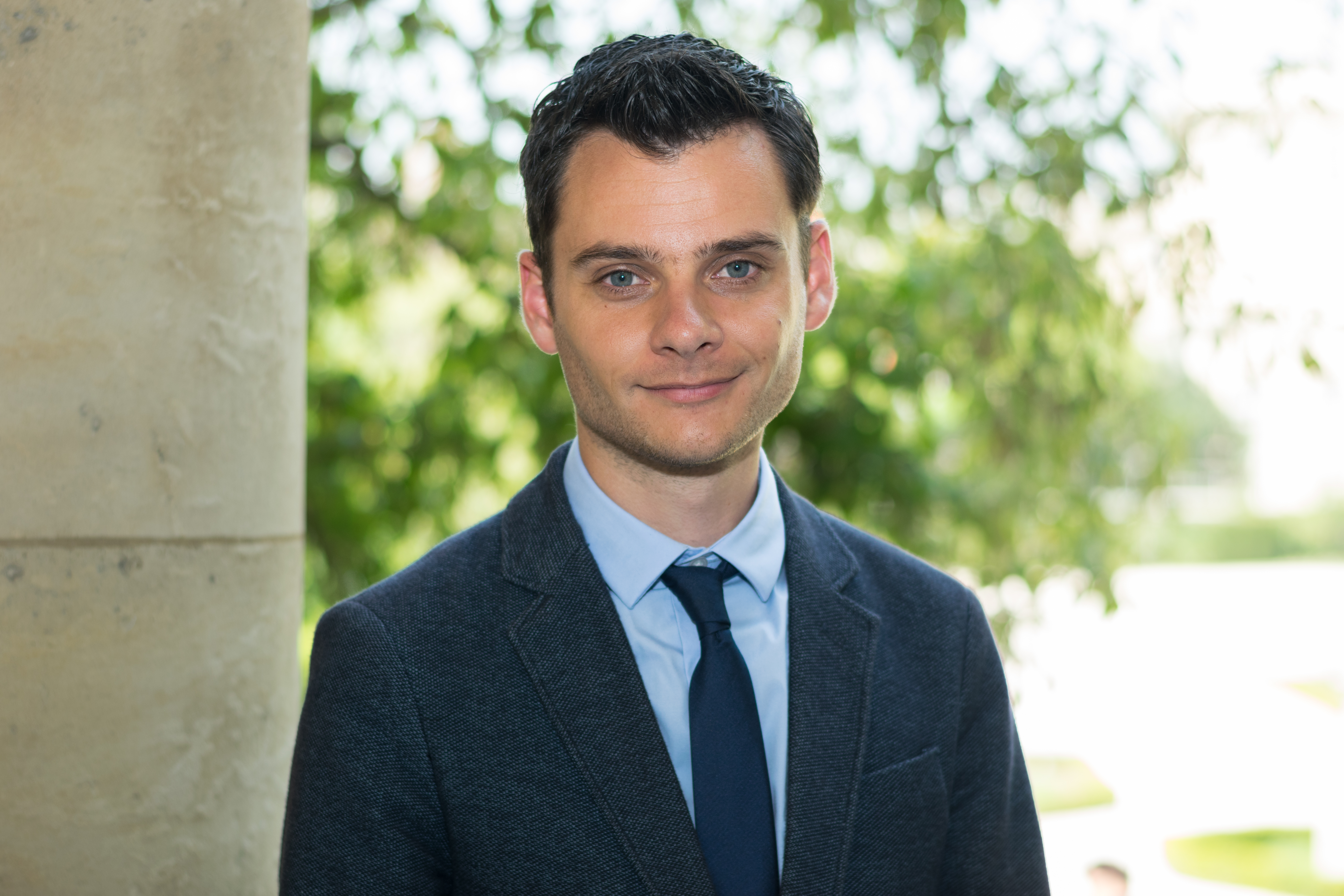
- Damien Adam in 2017

Member of the National Assembly for Seine-Maritime's 1st constituency
- In office 21 June 2017 – 9 June 2024
- Preceded by: Valérie Fourneyron
- Succeeded by: Florence Hérouin-Léautey

Personal details
- Born: 28 June 1989 (age 37) Orléans, France
- Party: Renaissance
- Education: Toulouse Business School

Damien Adam (born 28 June 1989) is a French politician of Renaissance (RE) who was a member of the National Assembly from 2017 to 2024, representing the 1st constituency of the department of Seine-Maritime.

== Political career ==
In parliament, Adam served as member of the Committee on Economic Affairs. In addition to his committee assignments, he is part of the parliamentary friendship groups with China and the Netherlands.

In 2021, Adam became one eight rapporteurs on climate change legislation introduced by the government of Prime Minister Jean Castex.

In the 2024 French legislative election, he was unseated by Florence Hérouin-Léautey from the Socialist Party.

== Political positions ==
In July 2019, Adam voted in favor of the French ratification of the European Union’s Comprehensive Economic and Trade Agreement (CETA) with Canada.

== Other activities ==
- Conseil national de l’industrie, Member

== See also ==
- 2017 French legislative election
