= Vincent Chriqui =

French politician (born 1971)

Mayor of Bourgoin-Jallieu
- Incumbent
- Assumed office 4 April 2014
- Preceded by: Alain Cottalorda

Personal details
- Born: 2 December 1971 (age 54)
- Party: The Republicans (since 2015)

Vincent Chriqui (born 2 December 1971) is a French politician serving as mayor of Bourgoin-Jallieu since 2014. He was a member of the Regional Council of Rhône-Alpes from 2010 to 2015, and was elected member of the departmental council of Isère in 2015. From 2010 to 2013, he served as director general of the Centre d'Analyse Stratégique. Ahead of the 2017 presidential election, he served as campaign manager for François Fillon. He was a candidate for Isère's 10th constituency in the 2012 and 2017 legislative elections.
