= Luc Geismar =

French politician (born 1966)

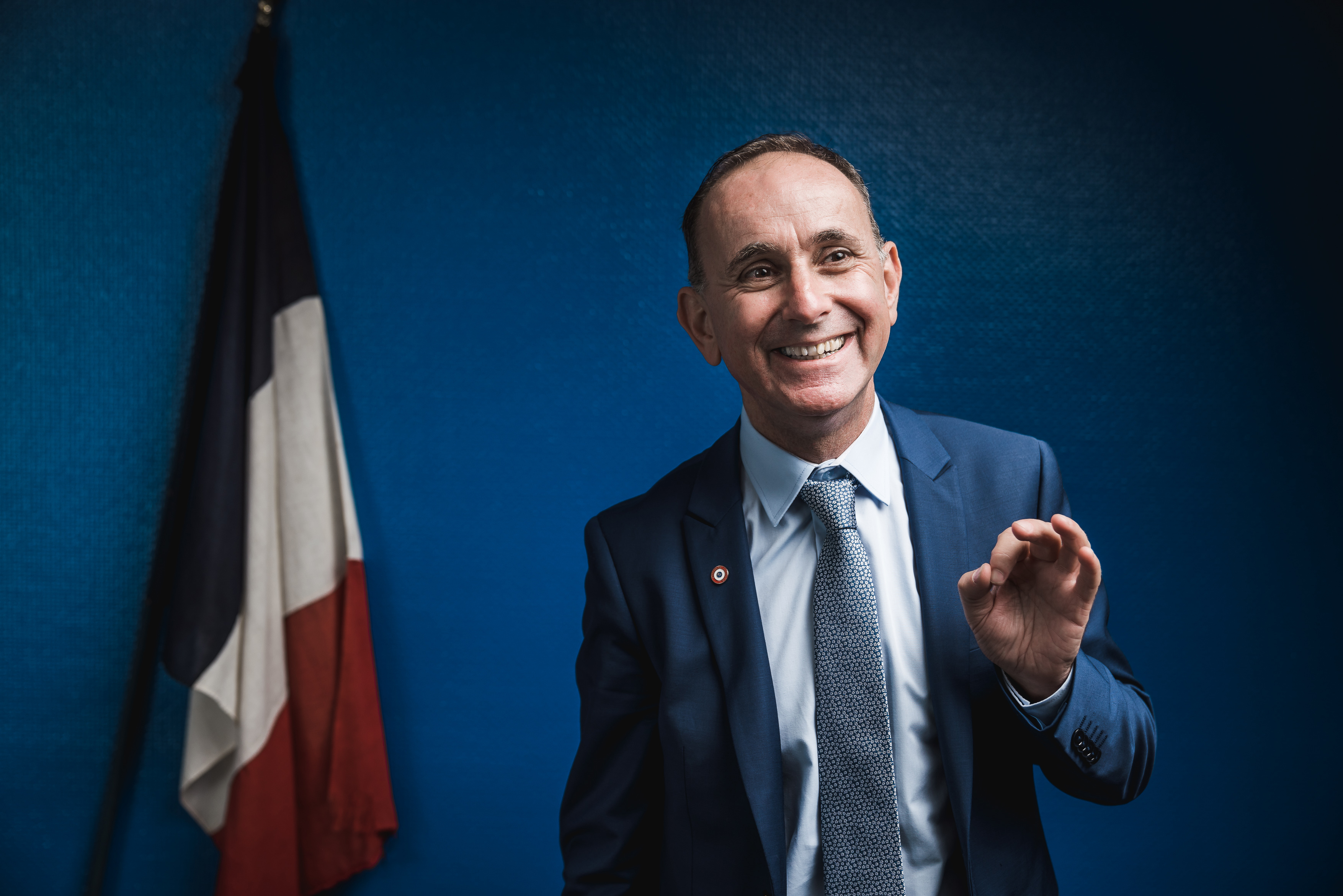
- Geismar in 2020

Deputy of Loire-Atlantique's 5th constituency
- In office 5 August 2022 – 9 June 2024
- Preceded by: Sarah El Haïry
- Succeeded by: Fabrice Roussel
- In office 27 August 2020 – 20 June 2022
- Preceded by: Sarah El Haïry
- Succeeded by: Sarah El Haïry

Personal details
- Born: 1 November 1966 (age 58); Colmar, France
- Political party: Democratic Movement
- Education: Lycée Alfred-Kastler

Luc Geismar (born 1 November 1966) is a French politician served as a member of the National Assembly for Loire-Atlantique's 5th constituency from 2020 to June 2022 and August 2022 to 2024.

He was the substitute candidate for Sarah El Haïry in the 2017 French legislative election, and replaced her when she was appointed for secretarial and ministerial roles. He was her substitute again at the 2022 election and replaced her in the 16th Assembly.
