= Joëlle Huillier =

French politician

- Parliamentary group: PS

Deputy for Isère's 10th constituency in the National Assembly of France
- In office 20 June 2012 – 20 June 2017
- Preceded by: New constituency
- Succeeded by: Marjolaine Meynier-Millefert

Personal details
- Born: October 6, 1948 (age 77)

Joëlle Huillier (born 6 October 1948 in Lyon), was a deputy in the 14th legislature of the French Fifth Republic for Isère's 10th constituency from 2012 to 2017 as a member of the Socialist Party. She was the first woman national assembly deputy from the north of Isère.

She is a City Councilor for Villefontaine, and was Deputy Mayor from March 19, 2001, to March 16, 2008.

She was made a Chevalier of the Legion of Honour on 31 December 2019.
