= Seine-Maritime's 2nd constituency =

Constituency of the National Assembly of France

2nd constituency of Seine-Maritime
- inline Constituency of the National Assembly of France

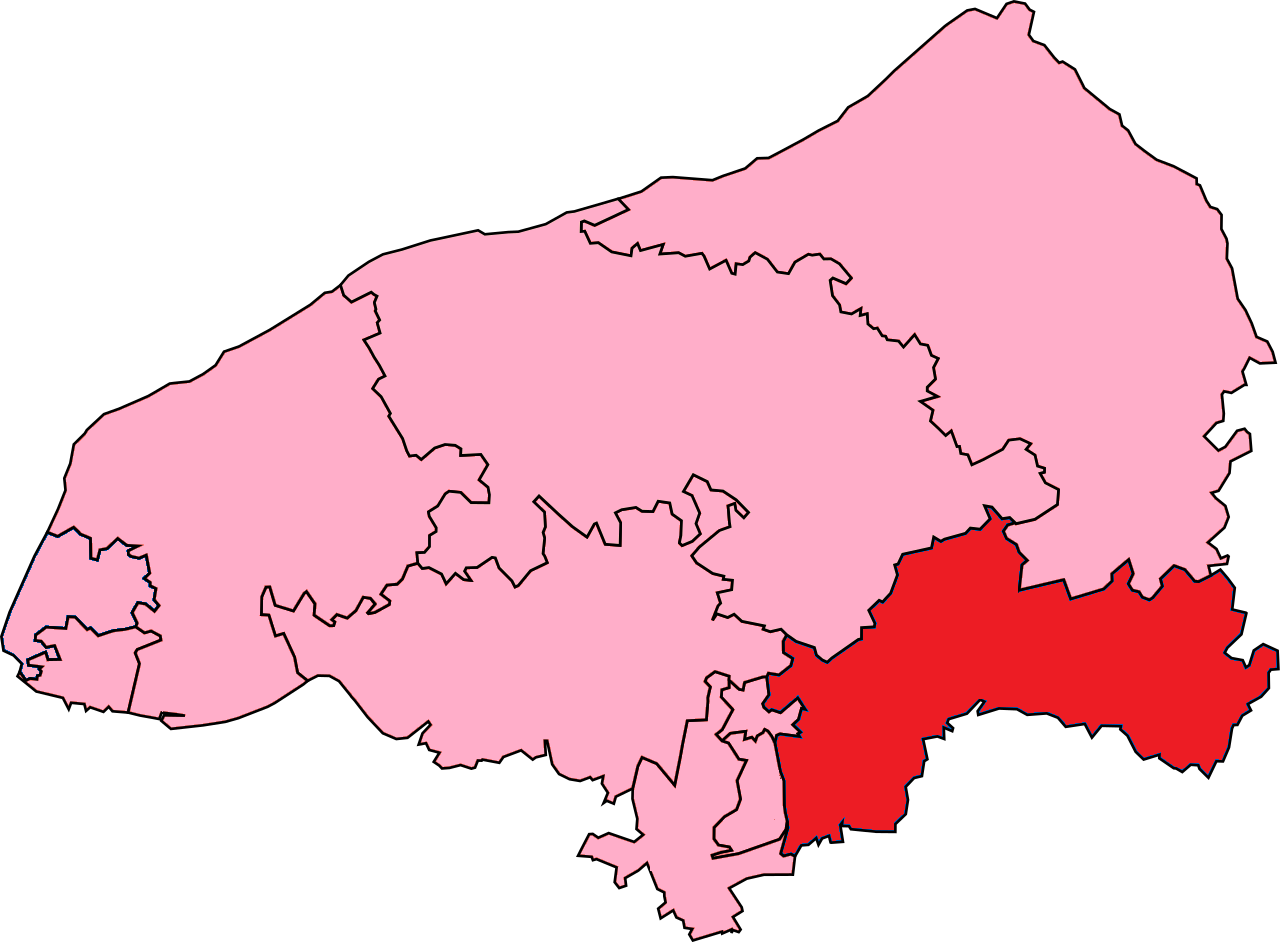
- Seine-Maritime's 2nd Constituency shown within Seine-Maritime
- Deputy: Annie Vidal; RE
- Department: Seine-Maritime
- Cantons: Argueil, Bois-Guillaume, Boos, Buchy, Darnétal, Gournay-en-Bray
- Registered voters: 94797

The 2nd constituency of the Seine-Maritime (French: Deuxième circonscription de la Seine-Maritime) is a French legislative constituency in the Seine-Maritime département. Like the other 576 French constituencies, it elects one MP using the two-round system, with a run-off if no candidate receives over 50% of the vote in the first round.

== Description ==
The 2nd Constituency of the Seine-Maritime covers the south east portion of the department to the east of Rouen. With exception of 1988 the constituency had supported the centre right UDF and UMP parties until 2017 when it succumbed to the En Marche! landslide.

The winning candidate Annie Vidal of En Marche! secured the seat with over 60% of the second round vote having secured twice the vote of the incumbent Françoise Guégot of the Republicans in the first round.

== Assembly Members ==
Election	Member	Party
1958	Tony Larue	SFIO
1962	Tony Larue	SFIO
1967	Tony Larue	SFIO
1968	Tony Larue	PS
1973	Tony Larue	PS
1978	Laurent Fabius	PS
1981	Laurent Fabius	PS
1981	Marc Massion	PS
1986	Proportional representation – no election by constituency	
1988	Dominique Gambier	PS
1993	Pierre Albertini	UDF
1997	Pierre Albertini	UDF
2002	Pierre Albertini	UDF
2007	Françoise Guégot	UMP
2012	Françoise Guégot	UMP
2017	Annie Vidal	LREM
2022	Annie Vidal	RE

== Election results ==
=== 2024 ===
Legislative Election 2024: Seine-Maritime's 2nd constituency
Party	Candidate	Votes	%	±%
LO	Jean-Claude Garault	877	1.28	N/A
REC	Frédéric Mazier	643	0.94	−3.08
DIV	Marie-Françoise Accard	666	0.97	N/A
PS (NFP)	Vincent Decorde	16,753	24.46	N/A
RE (Ensemble)	Annie Vidal	18,996	27.73	−4.80
DIV	Soren Petiot	0	0.00	N/A
RN	Vanessa Lancelot	23,135	33.77	+14.38
LR	Jonas Haddad	7,429	10.85	−2.28
Turnout		68,499	97.65	+45.69
Registered electors		95,776		
2nd round result
RE	Annie Vidal	39,754	59.92	+0.28
RN	Vanessa Lancelot	26,594	40.08	N/A
Turnout		66,348	95.22	+43.26
Registered electors		95,777		
RE hold		Swing		

=== 2022 ===
Legislative Election 2022: Seine-Maritime's 2nd constituency
Party	Candidate	Votes	%	±%
LREM (Ensemble)	Annie Vidal	16,332	32.53	-7.48
LFI (NUPÉS)	Sébastien Duval	11,113	22.13	+3.96
RN	Bastien Holingue	9,733	19.39	+5.86
LR (UDC)	Jonas Haddad	6,591	13.13	−5.76
REC	Maxence Briquet	2,016	4.02	N/A
DVG	Catherine Depitre	1,992	3.97	N/A
Others	N/A	2,429		
Turnout		51,262	53.79	+0.90
2nd round result
LREM (Ensemble)	Annie Vidal	26,856	59.64	-0.90
LFI (NUPÉS)	Sébastien Duval	18,175	40.36	N/A
Turnout		45,031	51.96	+12.38
LREM hold				

=== 2017 ===
Legislative Election 2017: Seine-Maritime's 2nd constituency
Party	Candidate	Votes	%	±%
LREM	Annie Vidal	20,058	40.01	N/A
LR	Françoise Guégot	9,470	18.89	−17.94
FN	Gilles Patitucci	6,781	13.53	−0.77
LFI	Alain Ninauve	5,546	11.06	N/A
PS	Jacques-Antoine Philippe	3,564	7.11	N/A
DVG	Yves Soret	1,254	2.50	N/A
Others	N/A	3,458		
Turnout		50,131	52.89	−6.87
2nd round result
LREM	Annie Vidal	22,716	60.54	N/A
LR	Françoise Guégot	14,805	39.46	−12.77
Turnout		37,521	39.58	−18.24
LREM gain from LR				

=== 2012 ===
Legislative Election 2012: Seine-Maritime's 2nd constituency
Party	Candidate	Votes	%	±%
UMP	Françoise Guégot	20,144	36.83	+3.17
EELV	Véronique Moinet	19,563	35.77	+31.32
FN	Elizabeth Lalanne De Haut	7,819	14.30	+10.63
FG	Christian Gauthier	3,422	6.26	+3.41
MoDem	Alain Ternisien	2,110	3.86	N/A
Others	N/A	1,632		
Turnout		54,690	59.76	−3.90
2nd round result
UMP	Françoise Guégot	27,635	52.23	+0.99
EELV	Véronique Moinet	25,275	47.77	N/A
Turnout		52,910	57.82	−4.60
UMP hold				

=== 2007 ===
Legislative Election 2007: Seine-Maritime's 2nd constituency
Party	Candidate	Votes	%	±%
UMP	Françoise Guégot	18,480	33.66	N/A
PS	François Zimeray	16,607	30.25	+6.18
NM	Pascal Houbron	9,270	16.88	N/A
LV	Stéphanie Taleb-Tranchard	2,444	4.45	−3.46
FN	Anne Dauvergne	2,015	3.67	−5.61
PCF	Claudine Duval	1,565	2.85	+0.29
Far left	Christine Gauchet	1,548	2.82	N/A
Others	N/A	2,975		
Turnout		55,910	63.66	−2.60
2nd round result
UMP	Françoise Guégot	27,311	51.24	N/A
PS	François Zimeray	25,994	48.76	+6.84
Turnout		54,818	62.42	−0.04
UMP gain from UDF				

=== 2002 ===
Legislative Election 2002: Seine-Maritime's 2nd constituency
Party	Candidate	Votes	%	±%
UDF	Pierre Albertini	25,163	46.48	+11.45
PS	Dominique Gambier	13,032	24.07	−4.06
FN	Muriel Poindefer	5,023	9.28	−4.65
LV	Philippe Vue	4,280	7.91	N/A
PCF	Annette Gallot	1,387	2.56	−5.75
Others	N/A	5,250		
Turnout		55,122	66.26	−2.01
2nd round result
UDF	Pierre Albertini	29,119	58.08	+6.09
PS	Dominique Gambier	21,014	41.92	−6.09
Turnout		51,966	62.46	−9.58
UDF hold				

=== 1997 ===
Legislative Election 1997: Seine-Maritime's 2nd constituency
Party	Candidate	Votes	%	±%
UDF	Pierre Albertini	18,015	35.03	
PS	Dominique Gambier	14,465	28.13	
FN	Josette Bossart	7,166	13.93	
PCF	Annette Gallot	4,275	8.31	
DVE	Christine Rambaud	2,585	5.03	
GE	Juliette Labroutil	1,981	3.85	
DVD	Bernard Dujardin	1,883	3.66	
Far left	Charles Soubeyran	1,053	2.05	
Others	N/A	2		
Turnout		53,802	68.27	
2nd round result
UDF	Pierre Albertini	27,970	51.99	
PS	Dominique Gambier	25,830	48.01	
Turnout		56,776	72.04	
UDF hold				
