= International Testing Agency =

Independent anti-doping organisation

- Abbreviation: ITA
- Formation: 2018; 8 years ago
- Type: Non-profit
- Headquarters: Lausanne, Switzerland
- Region served: International
- Official languages: English, French
- Key people: Benjamin Cohen·Valérie Fourneyron
- Affiliations: International Olympic Committee·World Anti-Doping Agency
- Website: www.ita.sport

The International Testing Agency, often referred to by the acronym ITA, is an independent organisation constituted as a non-profit foundation which implements anti-doping programmes for international sports federations, major event organisers or any other anti-doping organisation requiring support. The organisation was created in 2018 under the supervision of the World Anti-Doping Agency (WADA) and the International Olympic Committee (IOC) to promote independence, expertise and transparency in the global fight against doping. Its headquarters are located in the city of Lausanne in Switzerland.

== History ==
The need to create an independent supervisory body in the area of anti-doping arose following the discovery of a systemic doping system in Russia in 2014–2015 established with the alleged collaboration of the Russian Anti-Doping Agency. Therefore, the International Olympic Committee and the Olympic Movement as a whole wanted to address the risk of a conflict of interest arising from a national anti-doping agency testing its own country's athletes, or from an international sport federation or sporting event organiser being both responsible for sanctioning athletes from their field and promoting the sport or the event.

At the Olympic summit of October 2015, the IOC proposed that an independent testing system be created in the area of anti-doping. Subsequently, in March 2017, a focus on anti-doping became one of the IOC's twelve key principles. The proposed solution was to create an independent organisation to outsource the testing procedures to. This new body would no longer be handled by the sports organisations themselves, in order to ensure that all athletes from every nation and every sport would be subject to an independently-run testing programme.

In November 2017, an agreement was made between the IOC and the Global Association of International Sports Federations (GAISF) so that the Doping Free Sport Unit (DFSU), which made up the GAISF's anti-doping body, would become the operational nucleus of the International Testing Agency. In January 2018, the ITA board chaired by former French Sport Minister Valérie Fourneyron held its first meeting, and appointed its director general the following month. The agency, based in Lausanne, took the form of a non-profit foundation under Swiss law. These events took place in parallel with the 2018 winter Olympics in PyeongChang, during which the DFSU managed the anti-doping programme. The ITA became fully operational in July 2018.

Since then, the International Testing Agency's activities have grown across large-scale sporting events. The ITA also oversaw the anti-doping programme at the 2018 Summer Youth Olympics, the 2019 Winter Universiade, and 2020 Winter Youth Olympics. The agency was then duly appointed by the IOC to carry out the programme of anti-doping tests before and during the Tokyo 2020 Olympics. The agency has also carried out the re-analysis of the samples taken for the Olympic competitions preceding its creation. In June 2020, re-examining the samples collected at the London 2012 Olympics resulted in the detection of over 80 cases of anti-doping rule violations which had been undetected up until this point. The ITA independently prosecuted these positive cases, which led to medals being reassigned.

In July 2020, the ITA launched a training and certification programme for International Doping Control Officers (IDCO) that allows existing national-level Doping Control Officers to acquire advanced professional knowledge that enables them to work at top-level international events such as the Olympic games.

== Activities ==
The organisation manages anti-doping programmes for international sporting federations, Major Event Organisers, and any other organisations requiring support. These bodies are encouraged to outsource their anti-doping programmes to the ITA to take advantage of its neutral and independent expertise in this subject, whatever sport is played. The national anti-doping organisations (NADOs), being generally government-funded agencies, are invited to collaborate with the ITA on a voluntary basis, as it is not legally possible to mandate them to join the organisation

Since 2018, a growing number of international sporting federations have delegated their anti-doping programme to the ITA, either entirely or partially. In August 2018, around thirty federations had delegated their anti-doping test procedures to the ITA, with figures increasing to 41 international federations in November 2019. These include most notably the International Table Tennis Federation, the International Boxing Association (amateur), as well as the Judo, Handball, Gymnastics or Weightlifting Federations.

In 2020, the Union cycliste internationale (UCI) announced that it was transferring its anti-doping programme to the ITA from the 1st January 2021. The UCI constitutes one of the main international sporting federations in the field of antidoping, alongside FIFA, the World Athletics, and the International Tennis Federation. The International Testing Agency does not yet collaborate with these other three associations, but has engaged in discussions to persuade them to delegate their anti-doping test procedures to them, against a backdrop of recurrent debates on the effectiveness of the screenings performed for the sport.

The ITA is also supporting university sports through a cooperation agreement with the International Federation for University sports.

=== Structure and financing ===
The agency consists of a supervisory Foundation Board which is competent to appoint the director general of the body. When the ITA was created, the board was made up of Valérie Fourneyron, acting as independent chair, Uğur Erdener, vice-president of the IOC, Francesco Ricci Bitti, president of the Association of Summer Olympic International Federations, Kirsty Coventry, chair of the IOC Athlete Commission, and Peijie Chen, president of the Institute of Physical Education of Shanghai. In 2020, two additional independent board members were appointed. In addition, the World Anti-Doping Agency (WADA) has an ex officio non-voting representative in the board. The first director general, elected in February 2018, is Benjamin Cohen. In November 2019, the organisation had 41 employees of twenty different nationalities.

The organisation is financed through the services it provides to the sport organisations. The initial setup costs of the ITA were covered by the International Olympic Committee, which has planned to contribute 30 million dollars over five years to support its activities.
