= Colette Privat =

French politician (1925–2021)

Member of the French National Assembly
- In office 3 April 1978 – 22 May 1981
- Preceded by: André Martin
- Succeeded by: Jean-Claude Bateux
- Constituency: Seine-Maritime's 4th constituency
- In office 3 April 1967 – 30 May 1968
- Preceded by: André Chérasse
- Succeeded by: Olivier de Sarnez
- Constituency: Seine-Maritime's 4th constituency

Mayor of Maromme
- In office 1977–1998

General Councillor of the Canton of Maromme
- In office 1967–2004

Personal details
- Born: Colette Élisabeth Moat; 14 November 1925 Paris, France
- Died: 7 April 2021 (aged 95) Rouen, France
- Party: PCF

Colette Privat (14 November 1925 – 7 April 2021) was a French politician. A member of the French Communist Party, she represented the Seine-Maritime department in the National Assembly.

== Biography ==
After earning an agrégation in literature in 1949, Privat began teaching at the Lycée Jeanne-d'Arc in 1968. She then served as an assistant professor in 1978.

Privat joined the French Communist Party in 1946. She became the first female General Councillor of the Canton of Maromme, serving from 1967 to 2004, as she was re-elected five times. Her platform centered around education.

Privat was elected to represent Seine-Maritime's 4th constituency in the National Assembly, serving from 1967 to 1968 and again from 1978 to 1981. During the events of May 68, she put forth a motion to condemn the Gaullist regime in which she stated ""ten years after taking power […] Refusing any real dialogue, forced students, teachers, peasants, workers and unemployed youth to resort to street demonstrations of an exceptional scale."

Privat was elected Mayor of Maromme in 1977 and was re-elected continuously until 1998. During her tenure, she rebuilt the city center and expanded the commune's cultural, sporting, social, and educational facilities. She also approved the development of two industrial complexes.

On 1 February 2014, Privat became a friend of L'Humanité newspaper along with Charles Silvestre, Régine Deforges, Daniel Herrero, Axel Kahn, and Gérard Mordillat.

Colette Privat died on 7 April 2021 at the age of 95.
