= Florence Hérouin-Léautey =

French politician

Member of the National Assembly for Seine-Maritime's 1st constituency
- Incumbent
- Assumed office 8 July 2024
- Preceded by: Damien Adam

Personal details
- Born: 28 December 1972 (age 52) Paris, France
- Political party: Socialist; NFP

Florence Hérouin-Léautey (born 28 December 1972) is a French politician from the Socialist Party. She was elected a member of parliament in the 2024 French legislative election.

== Biography ==
She is the daughter of Pierre Léautey the former mayor of Mont-Saint-Aignan and former MP. Before becoming a local elected official, she was a territorial attaché.

A member of the Socialist Party, she is a municipal councillor in Rouen and from 2020 to 2024, deputy to mayor Nicolas Mayer-Rossignol, with the delegation “Schools and early childhood”. She also sits on the community council of the Rouen Normandy Metropolis.

In the 2024 French legislative election, she was elected MP for Seine-Maritime's 1st constituency with 51.23% of the vote in the second round, and with Nicolas Mayer-Rossignol as her substitute.

== Controversy ==
The day after her victory in the legislative elections, during an interview on France Bleu Normandie, she considered that the constituency of which she was the new representative had been "stolen" from the socialist Valérie Fourneyron by Damien Adam in the 2017 election.

== Electoral record ==
=== Legislative election ===
Year	Party	Constituency	1st ^{round}			2nd ^{round}			Issue
Year	Party	Constituency	Votes	%	Place	Votes	%	Place	Issue
2024	PS (NFP)	Seine-Maritime's 1st constituency	20,040	44.44	1st	22,790	51.23	1st	Elected

== See also ==
- List of deputies of the 17th National Assembly of France
