= Seine-Maritime's 10th constituency =

Constituency of the National Assembly of France

10th constituency of Seine-Maritime
- inline Constituency of the National Assembly of France

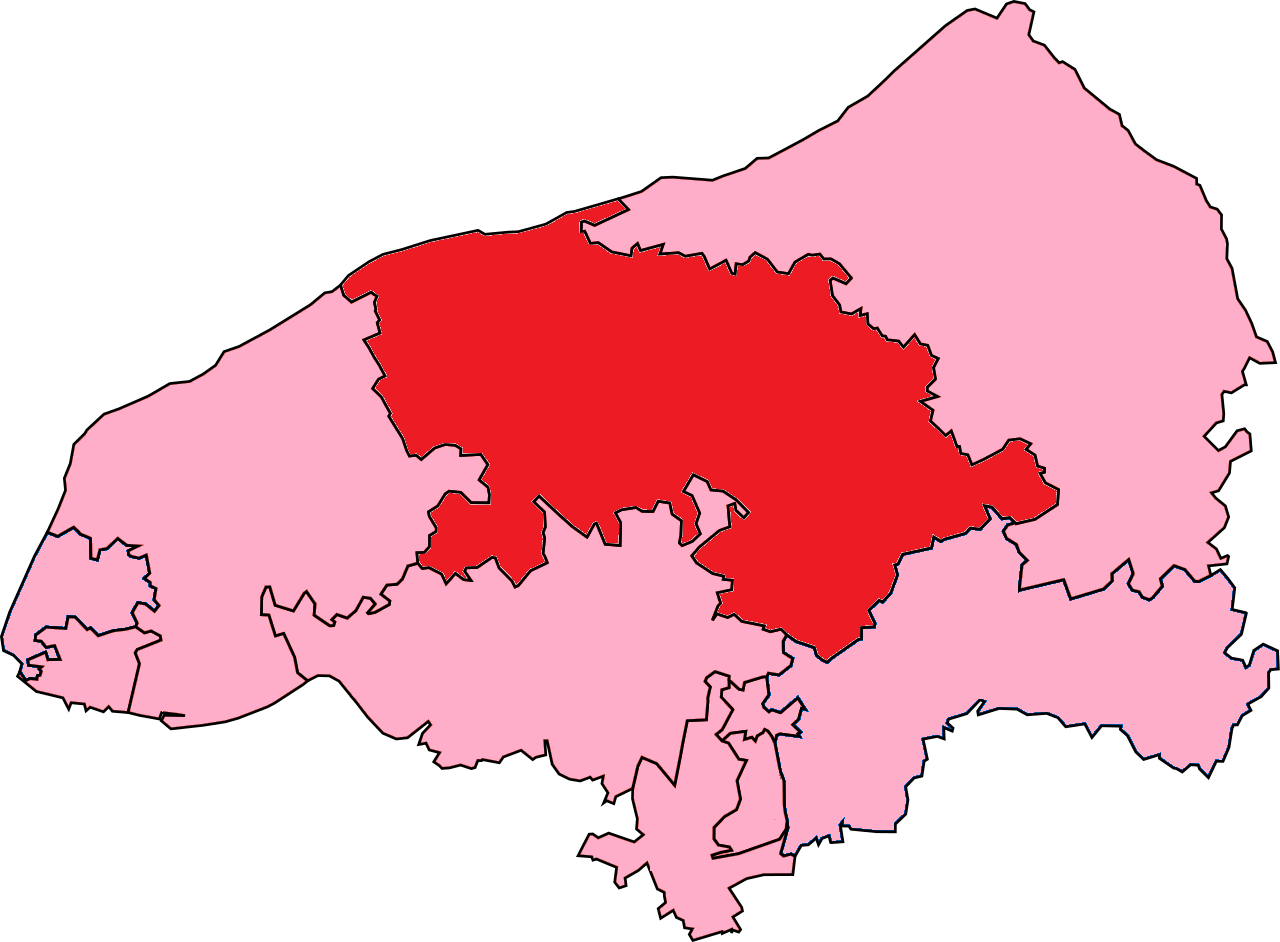
- Seine-Maritime's 10th Constituency shown within Seine-Maritime
- Deputy: Robert Le Bourgeois; RN
- Department: Seine-Maritime
- Cantons: Bacqueville-en-Caux, Bellencombre, Cany-Barville, Clères, Doudeville, Fontaine-le-Dun, Longueville-sur-Scie, Ourville-en-Caux, Saint-Saëns, Saint-Valery-en-Caux, Tôtes, Yerville, Yvetot
- Registered voters: 108745

The 10th constituency of the Seine-Maritime (French: Dixième circonscription de la Seine-Maritime) is a French legislative constituency in the Seine-Maritime département. Like the other 576 French constituencies, it elects one MP using the two-round system, with a run-off if no candidate receives over 50% of the vote in the first round.

== Description ==
The 10th Constituency of the Seine-Maritime expanded significantly as a result of the 2010 redistricting of French legislative constituencies covering a large central swathe of the department as well as a portion of its English Channel coast.

Following a similar patter to Seine-Maritime's 9th constituency the seat has swung between left and right since 1988 broadly in line with the national picture. In 2017 keeping with this pattern the constituency elected the candidate of Emmanuel Macron's En Marche! party. Mirroring the 9th constituency, Xavier Batut defeated a National Front opponent in the 2nd round run off. The seat elected the National Rally candidate in 2024.

== Assembly Members ==
Election	Member	Party
1958	Claude Heuillard	PRV
1962	Georges Delatre	UNR
1967	Georges Delatre	UDR
1968	Georges Delatre	UDR
1973	Georges Delatre	RPR
1978	Georges Delatre	RPR
1981	Georges Delatre	RPR
1986	Proportional representation – no election by constituency	
1988	Jean-Marie Leduc	PS
1993	Alfred Trassy-Paillogues	RPR
1997	Gérard Fuchs	PS
2002	Alfred Trassy-Paillogues	UMP
2007	Alfred Trassy-Paillogues	UMP
2012	Dominique Chauvel	PS
2017	Xavier Batut	LREM
2022	Xavier Batut	RE
2024	Robert Le Bourgeois	RN

== Election results ==
=== 2024 ===
Legislative Election 2024: Seine-Maritime's 10th constituency
Party	Candidate	Votes	%	±%
REC	Nicolas Dumas	901	1.19	−2.37
DLF	Rémy Lecuyer	890	1.17	N/A
PCF (NFP)	Handy Barré	13,254	17.44	N/A
RN	Robert Le Bourgeois	34,431	45.29	+15.87
HOR (Ensemble)	Xavier Batut	19,420	25.55	−5.03
LO	Alain Rivière	1,033	1.36	N/A
DIV	Jean-Nicola Rousseau	6,089	8.01	N/A
Turnout		76,018	97.06	+45.15
Registered electors		110,885		
2nd round result
RN	Robert Le Bourgeois	38,606	51.67	+2.72
HOR	Xavier Batut	36,115	48.33	−2.72
Turnout		74,721	95.13	+44.95
Registered electors		110,887		
RN gain from HOR				

=== 2022 ===
Legislative Election 2022: Seine-Maritime's 10th constituency
Party	Candidate	Votes	%	±%
LREM (Ensemble)	Xavier Batut	17,046	30.58	-3.64
RN	Anaïs Thomas	16,399	29.42	+9.78
EELV (NUPÉS)	Véronique Bérégovoy	11,710	21.01	−2.97
DVD (UDC)	Pascale Kéradec-Dujardin	3,981	7.14	N/A
REC	Nicolas Dumas	1,987	3.56	N/A
DIV	Jérôme Huvey	1,516	2.72	N/A
PA	Marine Lercier	1,226	2.20	N/A
Others	N/A	1,873		
Turnout		57,261	51.91	−1.29
2nd round result
LREM (Ensemble)	Xavier Batut	25,900	51.05	-10.67
RN	Anaïs Thomas	24,836	48.95	+10.67
Turnout		50,736	50.18	+2.86
LREM hold				

=== 2017 ===
Legislative Election 2017: Seine-Maritime's 10th constituency
Party	Candidate	Votes	%	±%
LREM	Xavier Batut	19,219	34.22	N/A
FN	Stacy Blondel	11,028	19.64	+6.16
LR	Charles D'Anjou	9,299	16.56	−22.46
LFI	Anne Lecoq-Cherblanc	5,987	10.66	N/A
PS	Jean-Pierre Thevenot	4,343	7.73	−31.15
EELV	Annette Roussel	1,745	3.11	+0.64
PCF	Isabelle Dujardin	1,393	2.48	−2.13
DLF	Frédéric Mazier	1,265	2.25	N/A
Others	N/A	1,886		
Turnout		57,853	53.20	−8.42
2nd round result
LREM	Xavier Batut	28,569	61.72	N/A
FN	Stacy Blondel	17,720	38.28	N/A
Turnout		51,463	47.32	−14.54
LREM gain from PS		Swing		

=== 2012 ===
Legislative Election 2012: Seine-Maritime's 10th constituency
Party	Candidate	Votes	%	±%
UMP	Alfred Trassy-Paillogues	25,458	39.02	−10.34
PS	Dominique Chauvel	25,372	38.88	+10.38
FN	Isabelle Gilbert	8,799	13.48	+10.00
FG	Aline Flaux	3,006	4.61	+2.39
EELV	Jolanta Avril	1,611	2.47	+0.19
Others	N/A	1,005		
Turnout		65,251	61.62	−3.60
2nd round result
PS	Dominique Chauvel	33,358	50.93	+6.08
UMP	Alfred Trassy-Paillogues	32,137	49.07	−6.08
Turnout		65,495	61.86	−2.87
PS gain from UMP				

=== 2007 ===
Legislative Election 2007: Seine-Maritime's 10th constituency
Party	Candidate	Votes	%	±%
UMP	Alfred Trassy-Paillogues	26,749	49.36	+20.83
PS	Dominique Chauvel	15,442	28.50	−2.78
MoDem	Jacques Rollet	3,339	6.16	N/A
FN	Jean Lebrun	1,885	3.48	−4.81
Far left	Aimericque Deregnaucourt	1,398	2.58	N/A
LV	Malka Kreizel-Debleds	1,237	2.28	+0.06
PCF	Aline Flaux	1,205	2.22	N/A
Others	N/A	2,933		
Turnout		55,328	65.22	−2.16
2nd round result
UMP	Alfred Trassy-Paillogues	29,554	55.15	+3.84
PS	Dominique Chauvel	24,034	44.85	−3.84
Turnout		54,904	64.73	−0.82
UMP hold				

=== 2002 ===
Legislative Election 2002: Seine-Maritime's 10th constituency
Party	Candidate	Votes	%	±%
PS	Gerard Fuchs	16,690	31.28	−0.99
UMP	Alfred Trassy-Paillogues	15,226	28.53	−7.28
UDF	Pascal Martin	10,986	20.59	N/A
FN	Michel Benard	4,422	8.29	−4.89
LV	Cecile Legendre	1,183	2.22	−0.62
Others	N/A	4,859		
Turnout		54,411	67.38	−6.96
2nd round result
UMP	Alfred Trassy-Paillogues	26,100	51.31	+3.92
PS	Gerard Fuchs	24,763	48.69	−3.92
Turnout		52,933	65.55	−12.08
UMP gain from PS				

=== 1997 ===
Legislative Election 1997: Seine-Maritime's 10th constituency
Party	Candidate	Votes	%	±%
RPR	Alfred Trassy-Paillogues	18,944	35.81	
PS	Gérard Fuchs	17,070	32.27	
FN	Béatrice Gosse	6,974	13.18	
PCF	Michel Tierursin	3,866	7.31	
GE	Véronique Turpin	2,121	4.01	
LV	François Ciesielski	1,502	2.84	
DVD	Michel Thourot	1,246	2.36	
Others	N/A	1,182		
Turnout		55,759	74.34	
2nd round result
PS	Gérard Fuchs	29,279	52.61	
RPR	Alfred Trassy-Paillogues	26,371	47.39	
Turnout		58,372	77.63	
PS gain from RPR				
