= Marjolaine Meynier-Millefert =

French politician (born 1982)

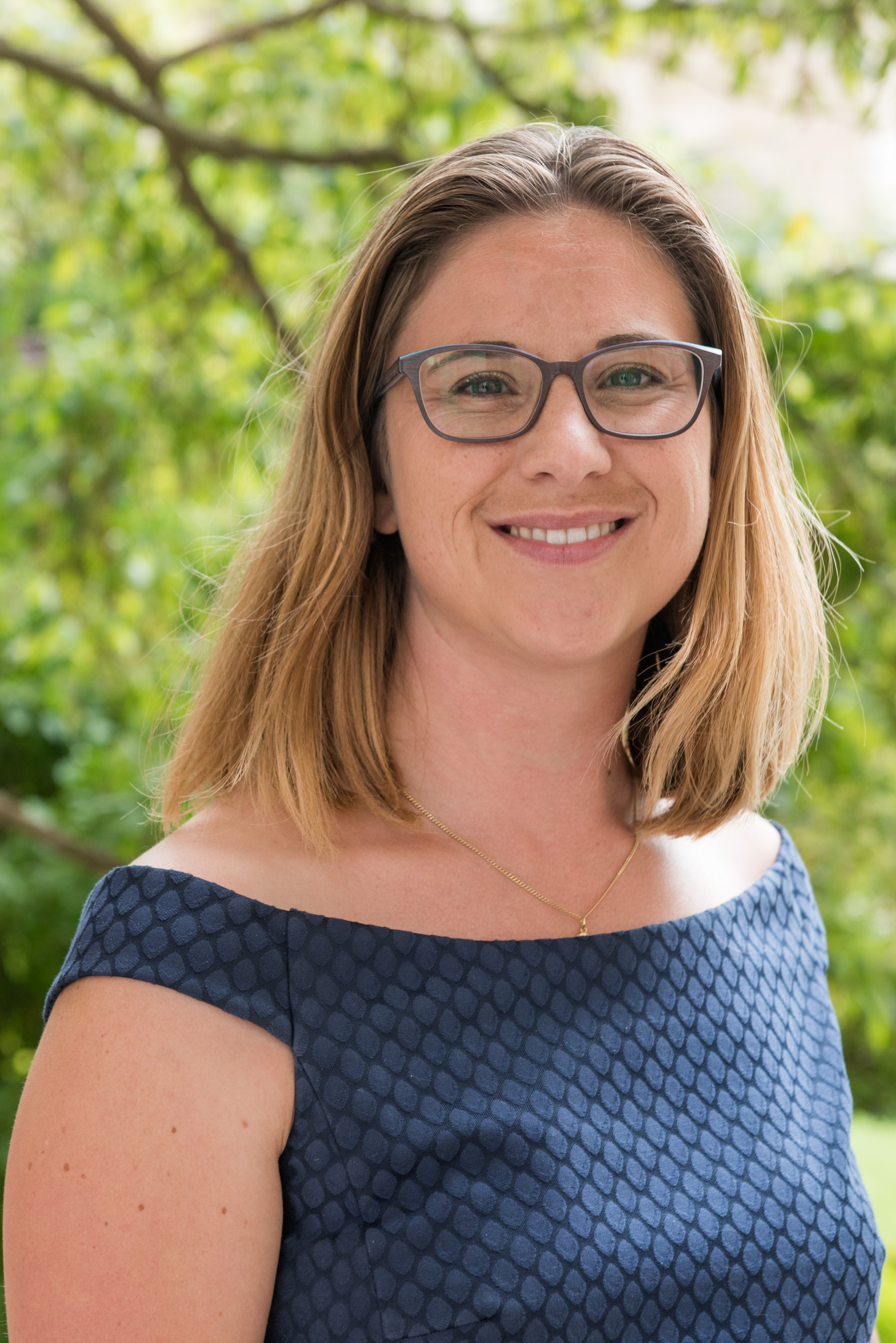
- Meynier-Millefert in June 2017

Member of the National Assembly for Isère's 10th constituency
- In office 21 June 2017 – 9 June 2024
- Preceded by: Joëlle Huillier
- Succeeded by: Thierry Perez

Personal details
- Born: 30 September 1982 (age 44) Échirolles, France
- Party: Renaissance (2016–present); Territories of Progress (2020–present)
- Education: University Grenoble-3

Marjolaine Meynier-Millefert (born 30 September 1982) is a French politician who has represented the 10th constituency of the Isère department in the National Assembly since 2017. She is a member of both of Renaissance (RE, formerly La République En Marche!) and Territories of Progress (TdP).

== Early life and career ==
Born in September 1982 in Échirolles, to a Dutch mother, Meynier-Millefert grew up in Montagnieu, then continued her studies in Lyon, Paris, and Grenoble. She then became a teacher of English.

In 2013, Meynier-Millefert created a communication company for small and medium-sized businesses.

== Political career ==
=== Early beginnings ===
In December 2015, Meynier-Millefert ran in the regional council elections on the list of socialist Jean-Jack Queyranne, without herself being a member of the Socialist Party, and was elected.

=== Member of the National Assembly, 2017–present ===
In 2016, Meynier-Millefert coordinated the En Marche Committees in the north of Isère, and was selected by this movement as a candidate for legislative elections in the tenth constituency of this department. In the second round, she was elected with 64.62% of the votes cast, against the FN candidate.

In her parliamentary work, Meynier-Millefert specializes in the subject of energy renovation. She was appointed rapporteur of the Commission of Inquiry on the economic, industrial and environmental impact of renewable energies, on the transparency of financing and on the social acceptability of energy transition policies, on March 7, 2019. She represents the French National Assembly to the Higher Council for Building and Energy Efficiency.

In March 2021, Meynier-Millefert was appointed president of the Alliance HQE-GBC, a non-profit association that brings together building professionals and promotes sustainable construction.

In the 2022 election, Meynier-Millefert survived a swing to National Rally and retained her seat.

In the 2024 election, was unseated in the first round. Her seat was won by Thierry Perez from National Rally in the second round.
