= Françoise Guégot =

French politician

3rd Vice-President of the Regional Council of Normandy in charge of Higher education
- In office 18 December 2015 – 1 July 2021
- President: Hervé Morin
- Succeeded by: Julie Barenton Guillas

Member of the National Assembly for Seine-Maritime's 2nd constituency
- In office 20 June 2007 – 20 June 2017
- Preceded by: Pierre Albertini
- Succeeded by: Annie Vidal

Mayor of Mont-Saint-Aignan
- In office 19 March 2001 – 16 March 2008
- Preceded by: Pierre Albertini
- Succeeded by: Pierre Léautey

Personal details
- Born: 11 August 1962 (age 64) Oullins, France
- Party: UMP; The Republicans
- Education: École Polytechnique Féminine; Paris Dauphine University

Françoise Guégot (French: [fʁɑ̃swaz ɡeɡo]; born 11 August 1962) was a member of the National Assembly of France. She represented Seine-Maritime's 2nd constituency, as a member of the Union for a Popular Movement from 2007 to 2017.
