= Isère's 10th constituency =

Constituency of the National Assembly of France

10th constituency of Isère
- inline Constituency of the National Assembly of France

- Constituency in Department

- Location of Isère in France
- Deputy: Thierry Perez; RN
- Department: Isère

The 10th constituency of Isère is one of ten French legislative constituencies in the Isère département.

It was created in the 2010 redistricting of French legislative constituencies and consists of the (pre-2015 cantonal re-organisation) cantons of Bourgoin-Jallieu-Sud, La Verpillière, L'Isle-d'Abeau, La Tour-du-Pin and Pont-de-Beauvoisin.

== Deputies ==
Election	Member	Party
2012	Joëlle Huillier	PS
2017	Marjolaine Meynier-Millefert	LREM
2022	Marjolaine Meynier-Millefert	RE
2024	Thierry Perez	RN

== Election results ==
=== 2024 ===
Candidate	Party	Alliance	First round			Second round		
Candidate	Party	Alliance	Votes	%	+/–	Votes	%	+/–
Thierry Perez	RN		28,348	42.83	+15.83	33,413	55.40	+7.91
Joëlle Richol	LFI	NFP	16,833	25.43	+1.48	26,904	44.60	new
Marjolaine Meynier-Millefert	REN	Ensemble	14,688	22.19	-3.73	withdrew		
Aurélien Lepretre	LR	UDC	5,318	8.03	-0.79			
Clément Bordes	LO		999	1.51	+0.74			
Votes			66,186	100.00		60,317	100.00	
Valid votes			66,186	97.74	-0.48	60,317	89.04	-2.38
Blank votes			1,152	1.70	+0.38	6,119	9.03	+2.21
Null votes			380	0.56	+0.10	1,308	1.93	+0.17
Turnout			67,718	68.13	+23.02	67,744	68.14	+25.39
Abstentions			31,677	31.87	-23.02	31,672	31.86	-25.39
Registered voters			99,395			99,416		
Result			RN GAIN FROM RE					

=== 2022 ===
Legislative Election 2022: Isère's 10th constituency
Party	Candidate	Votes	%	±%
RN	Nathalie Germain	11,817	27.00	+8.33
LREM (Ensemble)	Marjolaine Meynier-Millefert	11,347	25.92	-8.46
LFI (NUPÉS)	Allan Brunon	10,485	23.95	−1.99
LR (UDC)	Aurélien Lepretre	3,861	8.82	−6.58
REC	Stéphane Blanchon	2,007	4.59	N/A
FGR	Elodie Jammot Schwander	1,179	2.69	N/A
DVE	Estelle Merino	1,099	2.51	N/A
Others	N/A	1,978		
Turnout		43,773	45.11	−0.07
2nd round result
LREM (Ensemble)	Marjolaine Meynier-Millefert	20,282	52.51	-12.11
RN	Nathalie Germain	18,345	47.49	+12.11
Turnout		38,627	42.75	+3.52
LREM hold		Swing	-12.11	

=== 2017 ===
Candidate	Label	First round		Second round	
Candidate	Label	Votes	%	Votes	%
Marjolaine Meynier-Millefert	REM	14,324	34.38	21,566	64.62
Alain Breuil	FN	7,778	18.67	11,806	35.38
Vincent Chriqui	LR	6,415	15.40		
Thierry Monchatre-Jacquot	FI	4,731	11.36		
Joëlle Huillier	PS	3,923	9.42		
Frédéric Espinoza	ECO	1,352	3.25		
Nicolas Monin-Veyret	DLF	1,084	2.60		
Mehdi Sahraoui	PCF	794	1.91		
Clément Bordes	EXG	349	0.84		
Clément Volle	DIV	275	0.66		
Vincent Gobert	DVG	272	0.65		
Valérie Eynard	ECO	182	0.44		
Laurent Favre	DVG	179	0.43		
Nourredine Bouricha	ECO	0	0.00		
Votes		41,658	100.00	33,372	100.00
Valid votes		41,658	98.31	33,372	90.74
Blank votes		534	1.26	2,622	7.13
Null votes		181	0.43	785	2.13
Turnout		42,373	45.18	36,779	39.23
Abstentions		51,414	54.82	56,982	60.77
Registered voters		93,787		93,761	
Source: Ministry of the Interior

=== 2012 ===
2012 legislative election in Isere's 10th constituency
Candidate	Party	First round		Second round	
Candidate	Party	Votes	%	Votes	%
Joëlle Huillier	PS	15,493	32.26%	22,688	50.98%
Vincent Chriqui	UMP	12,868	26.80%	21,812	49.02%
Antonin Sabatier	FN	10,257	21.36%		
Nicole Varas	FG	3,174	6.61%		
René Vial	UMP dissident	1,626	3.39%		
Patricia Andre-Constantin	EELV	1,606	3.34%		
Denis Thevenon	MoDem	683	1.42%		
Danielle Alphand	UMP dissident	600	1.25%		
Jennifer Fournier	??	372	0.77%		
Eric Glaume	MRC	327	0.68%		
Nourredine Bouricha	AEI	276	0.57%		
Christianne Bordes	LO	195	0.41%		
Claude Ageron	POI	188	0.39%		
Marc Nauroy	NPA	186	0.39%		
Pierre-André Fontaine	CNIP	171	0.36%		
Valid votes		48,022	98.69%	44,500	96.78%
Spoilt and null votes		639	1.31%	1,481	3.22%
Votes cast / turnout		48,661	55.44%	45,981	52.39%
Abstentions		39,106	44.56%	41,785	47.61%
Registered voters		87,767	100.00%	87,766	100.00%
