= Thierry Perez =

French politician (born 1966)

Member of the French National Assembly for Isère's 10th constituency
- Incumbent
- Assumed office 18 July 2024
- Preceded by: Marjolaine Meynier-Millefert

Personal details
- Born: 19 November 1966 (age 58); Paris, France
- Political party: National Rally

Thierry Perez (born 19 November 1966) is a French politician of the National Rally who was elected member of the National Assembly for Isère's 10th constituency in 2024.
