= Allan Brunon =

French politician

- Born: June 24, 1999 (age 27); Grenoble, France
- Education: Grenoble Institute of Political Studies
- Occupation: Politician
- Known for: Municipal councillor in Grenoble
- Political party: La France Insoumise
- Movement: Anti-fascism

Allan Brunon or Allan Adel-Brunon (born 24 June 1999) is a French politician. As member of La France Insoumise (LFI), he has been a municipal councillor in Grenoble since 2026 and serves as president of the LFI group in the city council. He is also a former mixed martial arts (MMA) practitioner.

== Early life and education ==
Born and raised in Grenoble, notably in the Villeneuve district, Brunon studied at Sciences Po Grenoble and at the Université Jean Moulin Lyon 3, where he focused on law and history. Before entering politics full-time, he competed in combat sports. He became French champion in kempo and signed a professional MMA contract in 2020, but his career was cut short by hand injuries and a cerebral concussion.

== Political career ==
Brunon joined the left-wing movement as a teenager, first with the Left Party and then La France Insoumise. He worked as a parliamentary assistant to deputy Gabriel Amard.In the 2022 French legislative election, he stood as the LFI–NUPES candidate in the 10th constituency of Isère, receiving 10,485 votes (10.61%) in the first round. A prominent anti-far-right activist, he co-leads the national "Réseau Insoumis Antifasciste" within LFI and is a member of the Observatoire national de l'extrême-droite. In 2025, Brunon led the autonomous LFI list "Faire mieux pour Grenoble" in the 2026 Grenoble municipal election. His list won 14.59% in the first round and formed a technical alliance with the ecologist list of Laurence Ruffin for the second round. Following the election, he was elected municipal councillor and became president of the LFI group in the Grenoble city council (with 13 elected representatives). In March 2026, shortly after the election, Brunon was involved in a controversy after a video showed him using the homophobic insult "sale tapette" during a confrontation with supporters of Alain Carignon; he publicly apologised for the remark. He lives in the Grenoble area.
