= Seine-Maritime's 1st constituency =

Constituency of the National Assembly of France

1st constituency of Seine-Maritime
- inline Constituency of the National Assembly of France

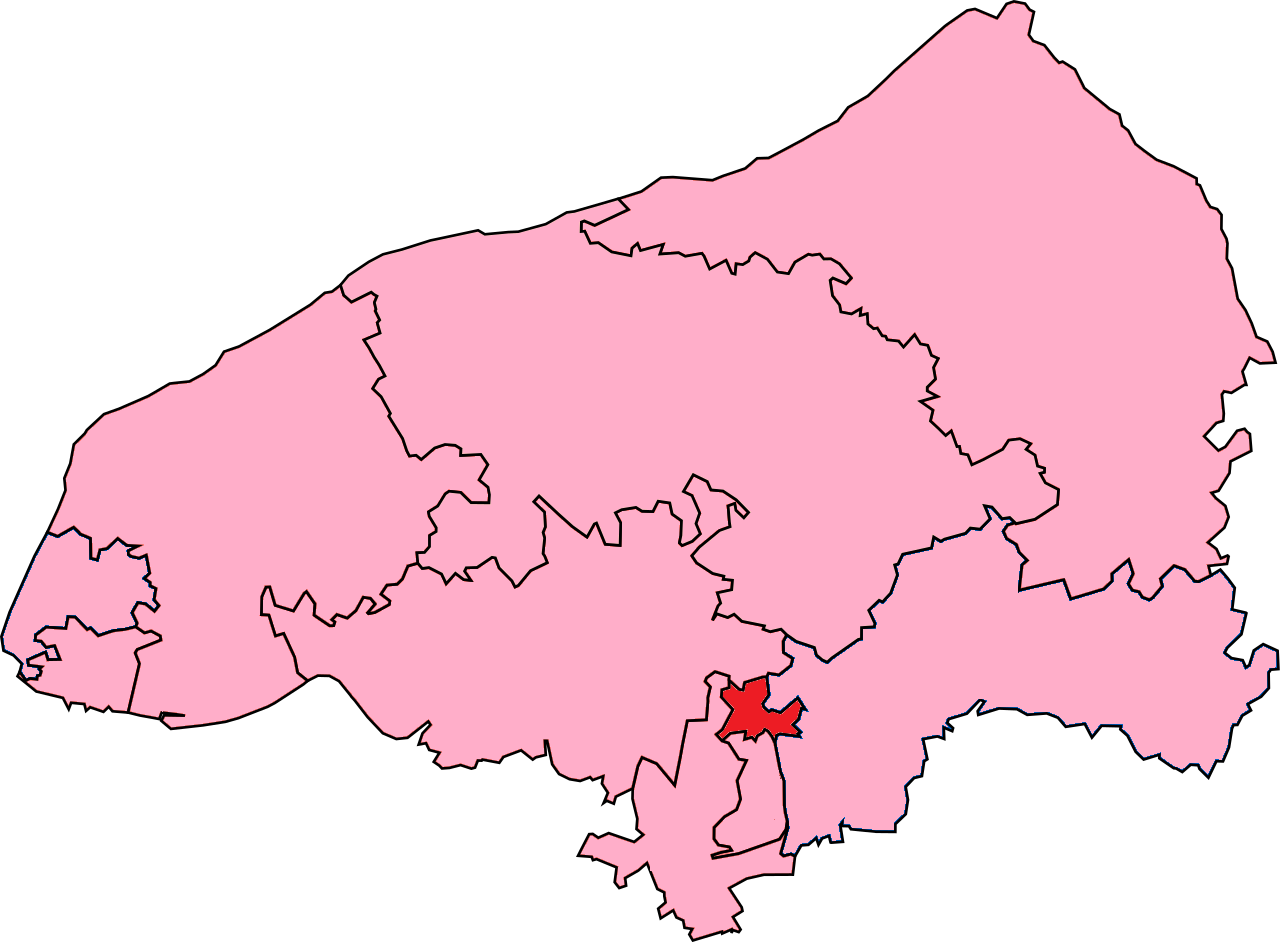
- Seine-Maritime's 1st Constituency shown within Seine-Maritime
- Deputy: Florence Hérouin-Léautey; PS
- Department: Seine-Maritime
- Cantons: Mont-Saint-Aignan, Rouen I, Rouen II, Rouen III, Rouen IV, Rouen V, Rouen VII
- Registered voters: 64488

The 1st constituency of the Seine-Maritime (French: Première circonscription de la Seine-Maritime) is a French legislative constituency in the Seine-Maritime département. Like the other 576 French constituencies, it elects one MP using the two-round system, with a run-off if no candidate receives over 50% of the vote in the first round.

== Description ==
The 1st Constituency of the Seine-Maritime covers the historic city of Rouen; the 2010 redistricting has widened it to include Mont-Saint-Aignan, a northern suburb of the city which has a large student population as home to the University of Rouen and the NEOMA Business School.

After 19 years of centre right representation the seat swung back to the Socialist Party (PS) in 2012 before then falling to the centrist En Marche! for two terms, reverting to a PS deputé (winning candidate) in 2024.

== Assembly Members ==
| Election | Member | Party |
|---|---|---|
| 1958 | Roger Dusseaulx | UNR |
| 1962 | François Codet | UNR |
| 1962 | Roger Dusseaulx | UNR |
| 1967 | Roger Dusseaulx | UDR |
| 1968 | Roger Dusseaulx | UDR |
| 1973 | Jean Lecanuet | CD |
| 1974 | Pierre Damamme | CD |
| 1978 | Henri Colombier | UDF |
| 1981 | Michel Bérégovoy | PS |
| 1986 | Proportional representation – no election by constituency | |
| 1988 | Michel Bérégovoy | PS |
| 1993 | Jeanine Bonvoisin | UDF |
| 1996 | Patrick Herr | UDF |
| 1997 | Patrick Herr | UDF |
| 2002 | Patrick Herr | UMP |
| 2007 | Valérie Fourneyron | PS |
| 2012 | Valérie Fourneyron | PS |
| 2012 | Pierre Léautey | PS |
| 2014 | Valérie Fourneyron | PS |
| 2017 | Damien Adam | LREM |
| 2022 | Damien Adam | RE |
| 2024 | Florence Hérouin-Léautey | PS |

== Election results ==
=== 2024 ===
Legislative Election 2024: Seine-Maritime's 1st constituency
| Party | Candidate | Votes | % | ±% |
|---|---|---|---|---|
| LR | Patrick Chabert | 2,606 | 5.78 | −2.84 |
| EXG | Marie-Hélène Duverger | 271 | 0.60 | N/A |
| DIV | Mikhail Stachkov | 3 | 0.01 | N/A |
| REC | Christian Savey | 465 | 1.03 | −3.07 |
| DVG | Richard Vacquer | 111 | 0.25 | N/A |
| ÉAC | Jody Horcholle | 122 | 0.27 | N/A |
| PS (NFP) | Florence Hérouin-Léautey | 20,040 | 44.44 | +33.32 |
| RN | Grégoire Houdan | 8,567 | 19.00 | +9.74 |
| RE (Ensemble) | Damien Adam | 12,456 | 27.62 | −0.58 |
| LO | Valérie Foissey | 454 | 1.01 | N/A |
| Turnout | | 45,095 | 98.27 | +47.54 |
| Registered electors | | 66,601 | | |
2nd round result
| PS | Florence Hérouin-Léautey | 22,790 | 51.23 | N/A |
| RE | Damien Adam | 12,690 | 28.52 | −21.60 |
| RN | Grégoire Houdan | 9,009 | 20.25 | N/A |
| Turnout | | 44,489 | 97.89 | +47.77 |
| Registered electors | | 66,621 | | |
| PS gain from RE | | | | |

=== 2022 ===
Legislative Election 2022: Seine-Maritime's 1st constituency
| Party | Candidate | Votes | % | ±% |
|---|---|---|---|---|
| LFI (NUPÉS) | Maxime Da Silva | 11,045 | 33.05 | -2.86 |
| LREM (Ensemble) | Damien Adam | 9,424 | 28.20 | -5.56 |
| PS | Christine De Cintre* | 3,718 | 11.12 | N/A |
| RN | Mélanie Crosnier | 3,094 | 9.26 | +1.50 |
| LR (UDC) | Marie-Hélène Roux | 2,886 | 8.62 | −7.10 |
| REC | Olivier Cleland | 1,372 | 4.10 | N/A |
| DVE | Pierre-Alexander Besson | 864 | 2.59 | N/A |
| Others | N/A | 1,020 | | |
| Turnout | | 33,824 | 50.73 | −1.28 |
2nd round result
| LREM (Ensemble) | Damien Adam | 15,823 | 50.12 | -4.56 |
| LFI (NUPÉS) | Maxime Da Silva | 15,745 | 49.88 | +4.56 |
| Turnout | | 31,568 | 50.12 | +7.82 |
| LREM hold | | | | |

* PS dissident, not endorsed by NUPES alliance.

=== 2017 ===
Legislative Election 2017: Seine-Maritime's 1st constituency
| Party | Candidate | Votes | % | ±% |
|---|---|---|---|---|
| LREM | Damien Adam | 11,471 | 34.64 | N/A |
| PS | Valérie Fourneyron | 5,702 | 17.22 | −24.28 |
| LR | Jean-François Bures | 5,302 | 16.01 | N/A |
| LFI | Lionel Descamps | 4,416 | 13.33 | N/A |
| FN | Claire Pradel | 2,667 | 8.05 | −2.04 |
| EELV | Véronique Beregovoy | 2,118 | 6.40 | +1.89 |
| Others | N/A | 1,440 | | |
| Turnout | | 33,543 | 52.01 | −4.67 |
2nd round result
| LREM | Damien Adam | 13,271 | 54.68 | N/A |
| PS | Valérie Fourneyron | 11,000 | 45.32 | −12.64 |
| Turnout | | 27,276 | 42.30 | −10.41 |
| LREM gain from PS | | Swing | | |

=== 2012 ===
Legislative Election 2012: Seine-Maritime's 1st constituency
| Party | Candidate | Votes | % | ±% |
|---|---|---|---|---|
| PS | Valérie Fourneyron | 15,235 | 41.50 | +6.40 |
| NM | Cyrille Grenot | 10,704 | 29.16 | N/A |
| FN | Guillaume Pennelle | 3,703 | 10.09 | +7.44 |
| FG | Carine Goupil | 2,891 | 7.88 | +5.45 |
| EELV | Stéphane Martot | 1,657 | 4.51 | −0.53 |
| MoDem | Didier Polin | 1,303 | 3.55 | −5.81 |
| Others | N/A | 1,216 | | |
| Turnout | | 36,709 | 56.68 | −2.34 |
2nd round result
| PS | Valérie Fourneyron | 19,784 | 57.96 | +2.80 |
| NM | Cyrille Grenot | 14,352 | 42.04 | N/A |
| Turnout | | 34,136 | 52.71 | −5.72 |
| PS hold | | | | |

=== 2007 ===
Legislative Election 2007: Seine-Maritime's 1st constituency
| Party | Candidate | Votes | % | ±% |
|---|---|---|---|---|
| UMP | Bruno Devaux | 13,672 | 38.35 | N/A |
| PS | Valérie Fourneyron | 12,512 | 35.10 | +2.63 |
| MoDem | Laure Leforestier | 3,338 | 9.36 | N/A |
| LV | Jean-Michel Beregovoy | 1,798 | 5.04 | −0.11 |
| FN | Catherine Salagnac | 945 | 2.65 | −6.19 |
| Far left | Yolande Heredia | 926 | 2.60 | N/A |
| PCF | Hélène Klein | 865 | 2.43 | −0.27 |
| Others | N/A | 1,592 | | |
| Turnout | | 36,082 | 59.02 | −5.51 |
2nd round result
| PS | Valérie Fourneyron | 19,289 | 55.16 | +5.95 |
| UMP | Bruno Devaux | 15,681 | 44.84 | N/A |
| Turnout | | 35,733 | 58.45 | −2.96 |
| PS gain from UDF | | | | |

=== 2002 ===
Legislative Election 2002: Seine-Maritime's 1st constituency
| Party | Candidate | Votes | % | ±% |
|---|---|---|---|---|
| UDF | Patrick Herr | 14,739 | 41.86 | +8.86 |
| PS | Valérie Fourneyron | 11,432 | 32.47 | +7.17 |
| FN | Dominique Chaboche | 3,112 | 8.84 | −5.27 |
| LV | Veronique Beregovoy | 1,813 | 5.15 | −0.63 |
| PCF | Hélène Klein | 950 | 2.70 | N/A |
| LCR | Christine Poupin | 777 | 2.21 | +0.18 |
| Others | N/A | 2,389 | | |
| Turnout | | 35,711 | 64.53 | +0.40 |
2nd round result
| UDF | Patrick Herr | 16,782 | 50.79 | +0.68 |
| PS | Valérie Fourneyron | 16,262 | 49.21 | −0.68 |
| Turnout | | 33,985 | 61.41 | −6.99 |
| UDF hold | | | | |

=== 1997 ===
Legislative Election 1997: Seine-Maritime's 1st constituency
| Party | Candidate | Votes | % | ±% |
|---|---|---|---|---|
| UDF | Patrick Herr | 11,592 | 33.00 | |
| PS | Laurent Logiou | 8,887 | 25.30 | |
| FN | Dominique Chaboche | 4,956 | 14.11 | |
| MRC | Patrice Siard | 2,847 | 8.10 | |
| LV | Jean-Pierre Lancry | 1,588 | 4.52 | |
| LO | Gisèle Lapeyre | 1,070 | 3.05 | |
| DVD | Hubert de Bailliencourt | 1,008 | 2.87 | |
| GE | Jean-François Fargnier | 917 | 2.61 | |
| LCR | Franck Prouet | 713 | 2.03 | |
| Others | N/A | 1,554 | | |
| Turnout | | 36,477 | 64.13 | |
2nd round result
| UDF | Patrick Herr | 18,567 | 50.11 | |
| PS | Laurent Logiou | 18,485 | 49.89 | |
| Turnout | | 38,910 | 68.40 | |
| UDF hold | | | | |
