= Robert Le Bourgeois =

French politician (born 1969)

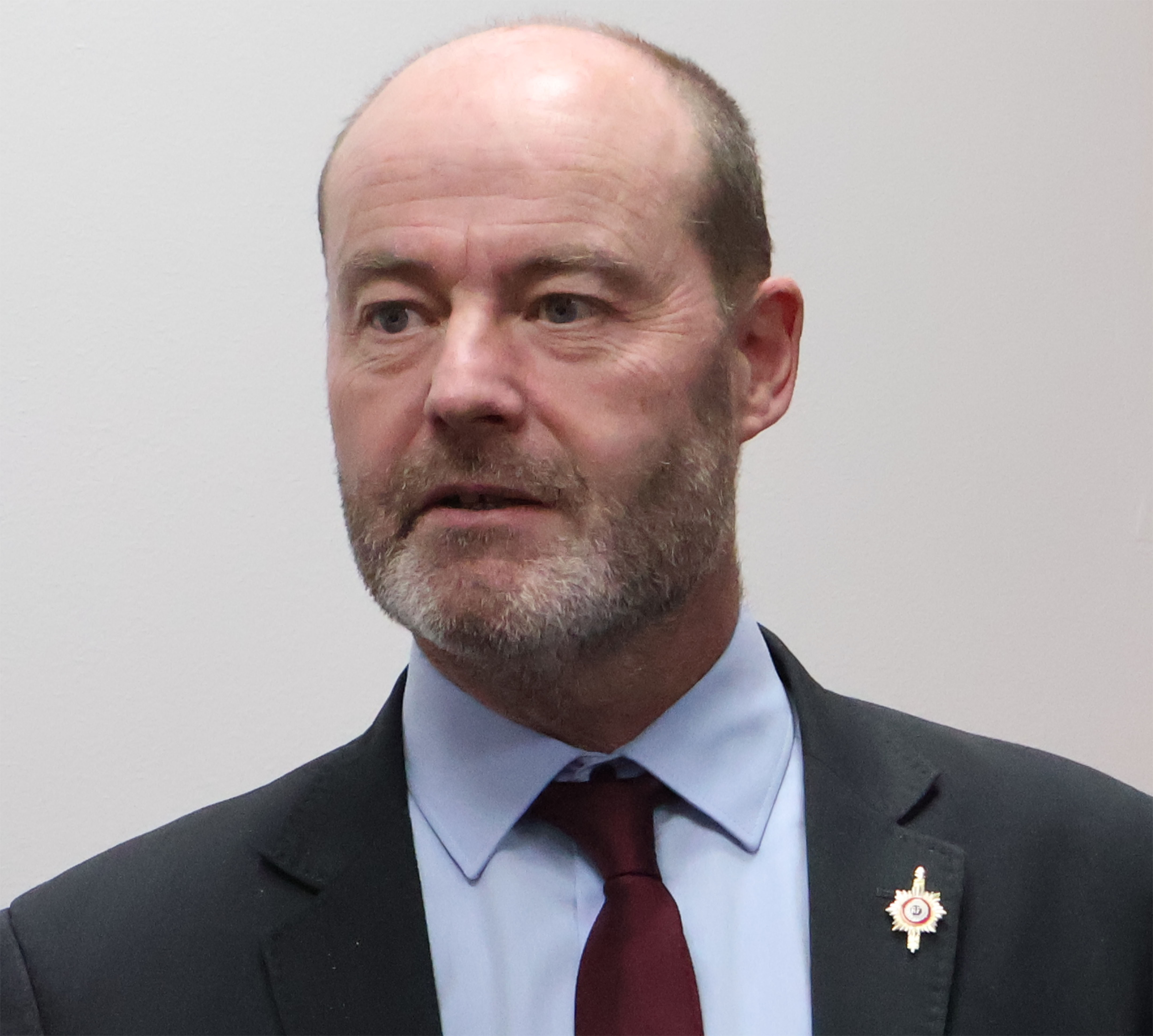

Member of the National Assembly for Seine-Maritime's 10th constituency
- Incumbent
- Assumed office 8 July 2024
- Preceded by: Xavier Batut

Personal details
- Born: 12 November 1969 (age 56) Dieppe, France
- Party: National Rally
- Education: Sciences Po

Robert Le Bourgeois (born 12 November 1969) is a French politician from the National Rally and deputy for the Seine-Maritime's 10th constituency.

== Biography ==
=== Training and professional background ===
Robert Le Bourgeois was born in Dieppe on 12 November 1969 and is the son of a farmer and a nurse.

Graduated from Sciences-Po Pari in 1992. He devoted himself to a professional career as a sales executive in financial services (financing of SMEs and local authorities).

=== Political career ===
During the 1995 French municipal elections, he led the National Front list in Dieppe.

He sat on the regional council of Haute-Normandie between 2003 and 2004 following the death of his running mate.

He was a candidate for the 2024 French legislative election in Seine-Maritime's 10th constituency, he won in the second round against the outgoing Horizons candidate Xavier Batut with 51.66% of the votes cast.

== See also ==
- List of deputies of the 17th National Assembly of France
