= Sarah El Haïry =

French politician (born 1989)

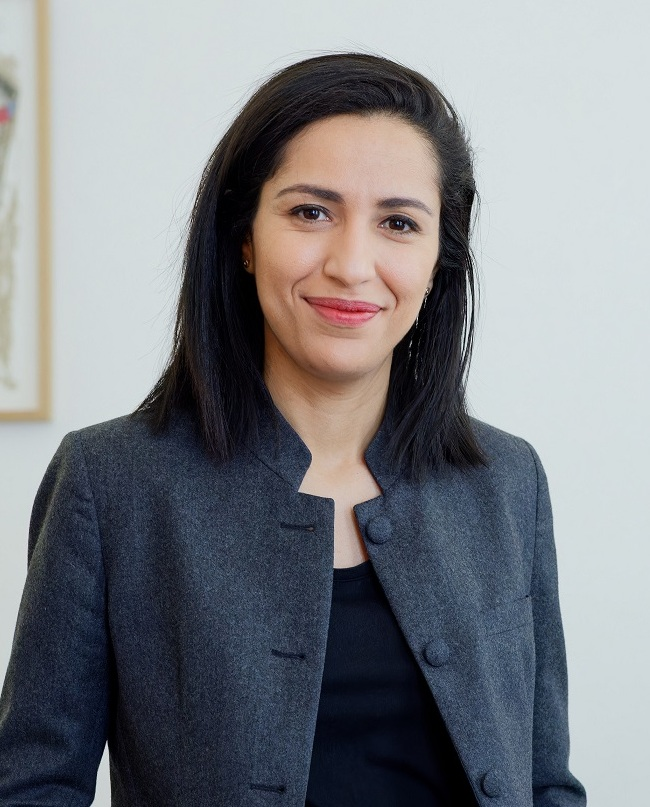
- Official portrait, 2023

Minister Delegate for Youth, Childhood, and Family
- In office 8 February 2024 – 21 September 2024
- Prime Minister: Gabriel Attal
- Preceded by: Charlotte Caubel (Childhood); Prisca Thevenot (Youth); Aurore Bergé (Family)
- Succeeded by: Gil Avérous (Youth); Agnès Canayer (Family and Childhood)

Secretary of State for Biodiversity
- In office 20 July 2023 – 11 January 2024
- Prime Minister: Élisabeth Borne
- Preceded by: Bérangère Couillard (Ecology)
- Succeeded by: Hervé Berville

Secretary of State for Youth and the National Universal Service
- In office 4 July 2022 – 20 July 2023
- Prime Minister: Élisabeth Borne
- Preceded by: Herself
- Succeeded by: Prisca Thevenot
- In office 27 July 2020 – 20 May 2022
- Prime Minister: Jean Castex
- Preceded by: Gabriel Attal
- Succeeded by: Herself

Member of the National Assembly for Loire-Atlantique's 5th constituency
- In office 22 June 2022 – 4 August 2022
- Preceded by: Luc Geismar
- Succeeded by: Luc Geismar
- In office 21 June 2017 – 26 August 2020
- Preceded by: Michel Ménard
- Succeeded by: Luc Geismar

Member of the Municipal council of Nantes
- Incumbent
- Assumed office 3 July 2020
- Mayor: Johanna Rolland

Personal details
- Born: 16 March 1989 (age 37) Romorantin-Lanthenay, France
- Party: Democratic Movement (since 2010)
- Other political affiliations: Union for a Popular Movement (until 2010)
- Children: 1
- Education: Nantes University
- Profession: Sales Executive

Sarah El Haïry (born 16 March 1989) is a French politician of the Democratic Movement (MoDem). She most recently served as Minister Delegate for Youth, Childhood, and Family in the Attal government in 2024. Previously, she was Secretary of State for Biodiversity from 2023 to 2024 in the Borne government.

El Haïry has also held the position of Secretary of State for Youth and the National Universal Service in two separate terms: first in the Castex government from 2020 to 2022, and then in the Borne government from 2022 to 2023. A former member of the National Assembly, she represented Loire-Atlantique's 5th constituency from 2017 to 2020 and briefly again in 2022.

== Early life and education ==
Born to Franco-Moroccan parents, El Haïry attended school in Metz and graduated from Lycée Lyautey high school in Casablanca in Morocco.

El Haïry studied law in Nantes and stayed in Canada before becoming a trader in a cooperative.

== Political career ==
Initially active within the Union for a Popular Movement (UMP), El Haïry left the party and joined Democratic Movement (MoDem) in 2010.

In parliament, El Haïry served as member of the Finance Committee from 2017 until 2020 and on the Committee on Legal Affairs from 2018 until 2019. In this capacity, she was the parliament's rapporteur on a 2018 bill aimed at improving the financial situation of associations and authored a 2019 report on philanthropy in France. In addition to her committee assignments, she was part of the French-Cypriot Parliamentary Friendship Group.

Since February 2018, El Haïry has been serving as MoDem's spokesperson, alongside Jean-Noël Barrot.

In July 2020, El Haïry was appointed Secretary of State for the Youth to the Minister of National Education, Youth and Sports Jean-Michel Blanquer.

== Political positions ==
El Haïry opposed the Aéroport du Grand Ouest project.

== Personal life ==
In April 2023, El Haïry outed herself in an interview as a lesbian woman, making her the first cabinet member in French history to do so.
