= Michel Ménard =

French politician

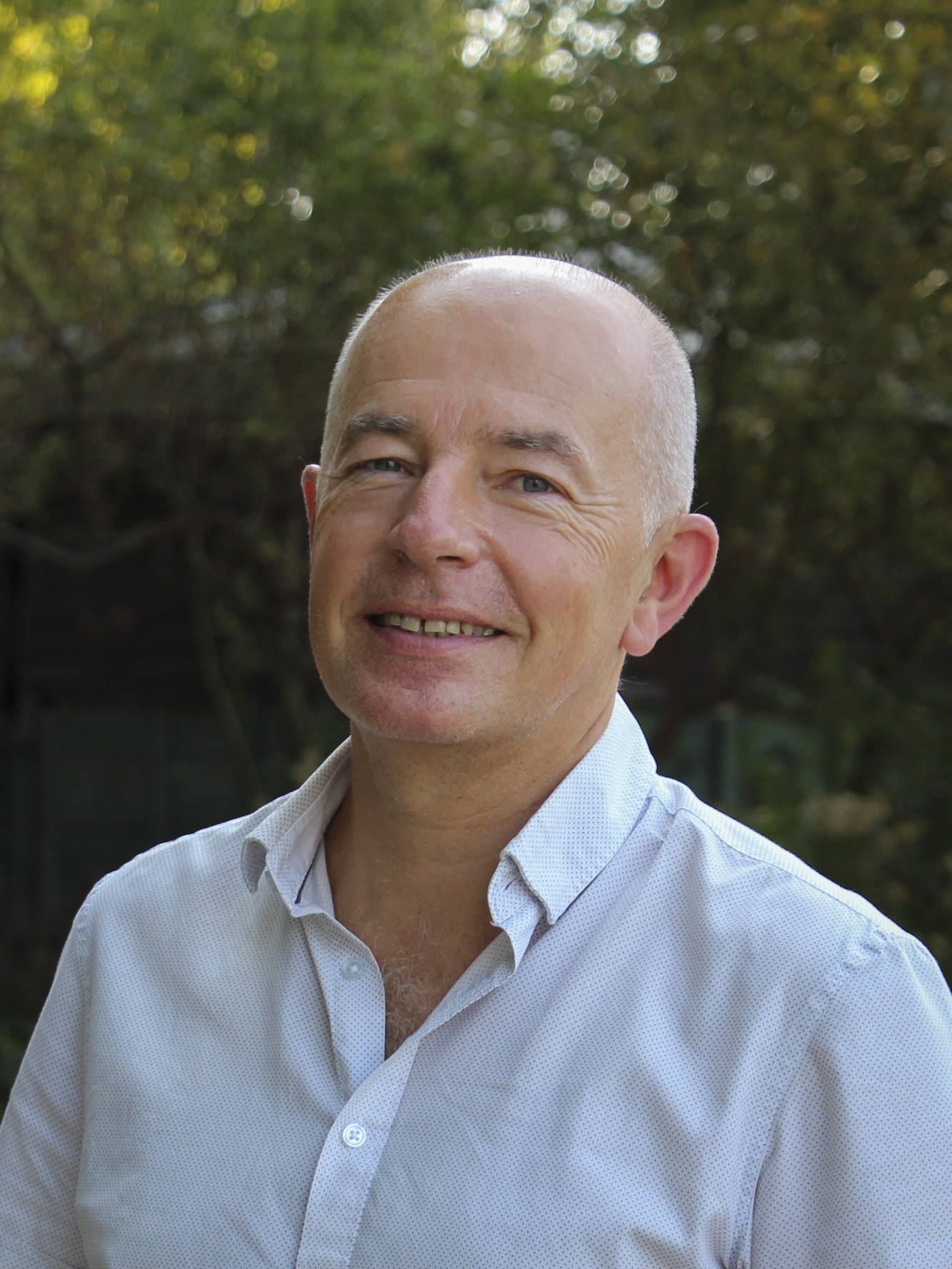
- Michel Ménard in 2020

Deputy for Loire-Atlantique's 5th constituency in the National Assembly of France
- In office 2007–2017
- Preceded by: Édouard Landrain
- Succeeded by: Sarah El Haïry

Personal details
- Born: May 20, 1961 (age 64)

Michel Ménard (born 20 May 1961) was a member of the National Assembly of France. He represented Loire-Atlantique's 5th constituency from 2007 to 2017, as a member of the Socialiste, radical, citoyen et divers gauche.
