= Loire-Atlantique's 5th constituency =

Constituency of the National Assembly of France

5th constituency of Loire-Atlantique
- inline Constituency of the National Assembly of France

- Constituency in Department

- Location of Loire-Atlantique in France
- Deputy: Fabrice Roussel; PS
- Department: Loire-Atlantique
- Cantons: Ancenis, Carquefou, La Chapelle-sur-Erdre, Ligné, Nantes VIII, Riaillé, Saint-Mars-la-Jaille, Varades

The 5th constituency of Loire-Atlantique is a French legislative constituency in the Loire-Atlantique département. Like the other 576 French constituencies, it elects one MP using the two-round system, with a run-off if no candidate receives over 50% of the vote in the first round.

== Historic representation ==
Election	Member	Party
1988	Édouard Landrain	UDF
1993	Édouard Landrain	UDF
1997	Édouard Landrain	UDF
2002	Édouard Landrain	UMP
2007	Michel Ménard	PS
2012	Michel Ménard	PS
2017	Sarah El Haïry	MoDem
2020	Luc Geismar (Note: Replaced Sarah El Haïry in August 2020 when she was appointed Secretary of State in charge of Youth and Engagement in the Jean Castex government in August 2020)	MoDem
2022	Sarah El Haïry	MoDem
2022	Luc Geismar (Note: Sarah El Haïry was re-elected, and then re-appointed Secretary of State for Youth and Engagement, and replaced by her substitute, Luc Geismar)	MoDem
2024	Fabrice Roussel	PS

== Election results ==
=== 2024 ===
Candidate	Party	Alliance	First round			Second round		
Candidate	Party	Alliance	Votes	%	+/–	Votes	%	+/–
Fabrice Roussel	PS	NFP	34,673	37.73	+5.01	36,774	39.91	-5.68
Sarah El Haïry	MoDEM	Ensemble	33,241	36.17	-1.28	34,441	37.38	-17.03
Bruno Comby	LR-RN	UXD	22,722	24.73	+13.18	20,918	22.70	new
Emmanuelle Clopeau	LO		1,261	1.37	+0.40			
Votes			91,897	100.00		92,133	100.00	
Valid votes			91,897	97.38	-0.61	92,133	97.75	+3.49
Blank votes			1,820	1.93	+0.37	1,642	1.74	-2.45
Null votes			649	0.69	+0.24	478	0.51	-1.04
Turnout			94,366	73.74	+21.28	94,253	73.63	+21.24
Abstentions			33,612	26.26	-21.28	33,757	26.37	-21.24
Registered voters			127,978			128,010		
Result			PS GAIN FROM MoDEM					

=== 2022 ===
Legislative Election 2022: Loire-Atlantique's 5th constituency
Party	Candidate	Votes	%	±%
MoDem (Ensemble)	Sarah El Haïry	24,235	37.45	-3.90
LFI (NUPÉS)	Sabine Lalande	21,174	32.72	-0.30
RN	Millà Karcher	7,475	11.55	+5.19
LC (UDC)	Didier Garnier	2,741	4.24	−9.53
DVE	Jérôme Debuire	2,686	4.15	N/A
REC	Arnaud Clemence	2,394	3.70	N/A
Others	N/A	4,005	6.19	
Turnout		64,710	52.46	−3.27
2nd round result
MoDem (Ensemble)	Sarah El Haïry	33,834	54.41	-6.61
LFI (NUPÉS)	Sabine Lalande	28,348	45.59	+6.61
Turnout		62,182	52.39	+8.52
MoDem hold				

=== 2017 ===
Candidate	Label	First round		Second round	
Candidate	Label	Votes	%	Votes	%
Sarah El Haïry	MoDem	26,346	41.35	27,613	61.02
Michel Ménard	PS	8,886	13.95	17,636	38.98
Frédéric Maindron	UDI	8,774	13.77		
Katell Andromaque	FI	8,723	13.69		
Arnaud de Rigné	FN	4,052	6.36		
Franco Fedele	ECO	2,965	4.65		
Solange Dalifard	DLF	862	1.35		
Pierre-Emmanuel Marais	REG	654	1.03		
Dominique Anée	DVD	479	0.75		
Michel Laboureur	PCF	465	0.73		
Didier Lefebvre	REG	434	0.68		
Hugo Sonnier	DIV	392	0.62		
Josette Bioret	DVG	352	0.55		
Stéphane Pellegrini	EXG	337	0.53		
Votes		63,721	100.00	45,249	100.00
Valid votes		63,721	98.29	45,249	88.66
Blank votes		793	1.22	4,284	8.39
Null votes		317	0.49	1,506	2.95
Turnout		64,831	55.73	51,039	43.87
Abstentions		51,504	44.27	65,292	56.13
Registered voters		116,335		116,331	
Source: Ministry of the Interior

=== 2012 ===
2012 legislative election in Loire-Atlantique's 5th constituency
Candidate	Party	First round		Second round	
Candidate	Party	Votes	%	Votes	%
Michel Ménard	PS	29,193	45.08%	36,040	60.23%
Maurice Perrion	AC	19,020	29.37%	23,796	39.77%
Anne Etourneau	FN	5,542	8.56%		
Geneviève Lebouteux	EELV	4,034	6.23%		
Françoise Thibaud Mesle	FG	2,786	4.30%		
Noura Moreau	DVD	1,030	1.59%		
Annie Le Gal La Salle	MEI	917	1.42%		
Marie Levrel	UDB	663	1.02%		
Loic Maurice	CNIP	661	1.02%		
Jean-François Lajeunesse	MRC	560	0.86%		
Patricia Peillon	LO	192	0.30%		
Jean-Pierre Bréus	POI	159	0.25%		
Valid votes		64,757	98.81%	59,836	97.67%
Spoilt and null votes		783	1.19%	1,426	2.33%
Votes cast / turnout		65,540	62.02%	61,262	57.97%
Abstentions		40,129	37.98%	44,414	42.03%
Registered voters		105,669	100.00%	105,676	100.00%

=== 2007 ===
Legislative Election 2007: Loire-Atlantique's 5th constituency
Party	Candidate	Votes	%	±%
UMP	Robert Diat	28,973	38.75	
PS	Michel Ménard	23,791	31.82	
MoDem	Maurice Perrion	10,603	14.18	
LV	Dominique Trichet-Allaire	3,297	4.41	
Far left	Christine Moiselet	1,695	2.27	
Others	N/A	3,951		
Turnout		76,029	66.15	
2nd round result
PS	Michel Ménard	36,891	51.11	
UMP	Robert Diat	35,292	48.89	
Turnout		73,861	64.27	
PS gain from UMP				

=== 2002 ===
Legislative Election 2002: Loire-Atlantique's 5th constituency
Party	Candidate	Votes	%	±%
UMP	Edouard Landrain	32,537	45.39	
LV	Patrick Cotrel	22,040	31.72	
FN	Monique Juguet	3,813	5.49	
PRG	Alexandre Mazzorana	2,895	4.17	
MPF	Sandra Bureau	1,679	2.42	
Others	N/A	7,514		
Turnout		71,073	68.16	
2nd round result
UMP	Edouard Landrain	34,171	54.24	
LV	Patrick Cotrel	28,831	45.76	
Turnout		64,791	62.13	
UMP gain from UDF				

=== 1997 ===
Legislative Election 1997: Loire-Atlantique's 5th constituency
Party	Candidate	Votes	%	±%
UDF	Edouard Landrain	24,378	39.86	
PRG	Alexandre Mazzorana	16,885	27.61	
FN	Christophe Bouhier	5,674	9.28	
PCF	Patricia Morinière	3,344	5.47	
Far left	Patrick Coterel	2,992	4.89	
DVD	Sandra Bureau	2,580	4.22	
GE	Thomas Limeul	1,553	2.54	
MRC	Jean-François Lajeunesse	1,460	2.39	
Others	N/A	2,287		
Turnout		64,876	70.07	
2nd round result
UDF	Edouard Landrain	33,569	53.28	
PRG	Alexandre Mazzorana	29,439	46.72	
Turnout		66,378	71.69	
UDF hold				

== Sources ==
- Official results of French elections from 1998: "Résultats électoraux officiels en France" (in French). Archived from the original on 20 December 2011.
