= Xavier Batut =

French politician (born 1976)

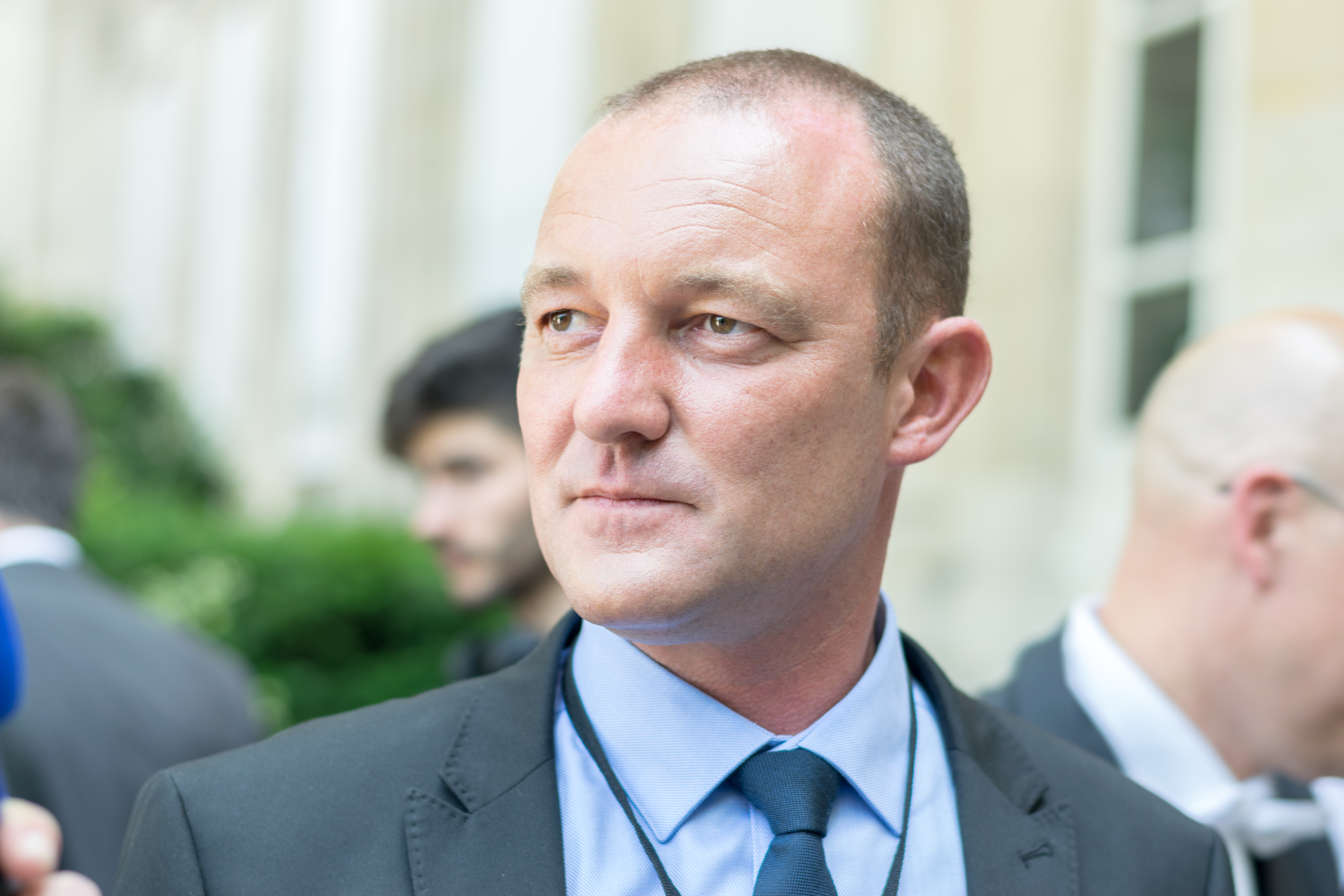

Member of the National Assembly for Seine-Maritime's 10th constituency
- In office 21 June 2017 – 9 June 2024
- Preceded by: Pascale Crozon
- Succeeded by: Robert Le Bourgeois

Personal details
- Born: 26 December 1976 (age 49) Créteil, France
- Party: Horizons (2023-2024)
- Other political affiliations: La République En Marche! (previously)

Xavier Batut (born 26 December 1976) is a French politician who was elected to the French National Assembly on 18 June 2017, representing the department of Seine-Maritime. From 2017 until 2020, he was a member of La République En Marche! (LREM).

== Early life and career ==
Batut was born in Créteil, in the Val-de-Marne. After studying industrial science and technology in Rouen, he worked as a sales executive in several Citroën establishments. He has lived in Cany-Barville since 2002.

== Political career ==
In parliament, Batut serves on the Defense Committee. In addition to his committee assignments, he is a member of the French-Slovak Parliamentary Friendship Group, the French-Hungarian Parliamentary Friendship Group, and the French-Polish Parliamentary Friendship Group.

In February 2020, Batut decided to leave LREM.

== Political positions ==
In July 2019, Batut abstained from a vote on the French ratification of the European Union’s Comprehensive Economic and Trade Agreement (CETA) with Canada.

== See also ==
- List of deputies of the 15th National Assembly of France
- List of deputies of the 16th National Assembly of France
