= Fabrice Roussel =

French politician (born 1973)

Member of the French National Assembly for Loire-Atlantique's 5th constituency
- Incumbent
- Assumed office 18 July 2024
- Preceded by: Luc Geismar

Personal details
- Born: 11 April 1973 (age 51)
- Political party: Socialist Party

Fabrice Roussel (born 11 April 1973) is a French politician of the Socialist Party who was elected member of the National Assembly for Loire-Atlantique's 5th constituency in 2024. From 2008 to 2024, he served as mayor of La Chapelle-sur-Erdre. He was elected to the Regional Council of Pays de la Loire in 2010, and was appointed first vice president of the Nantes Metropolis in 2016.
