= Annie Vidal =

French politician

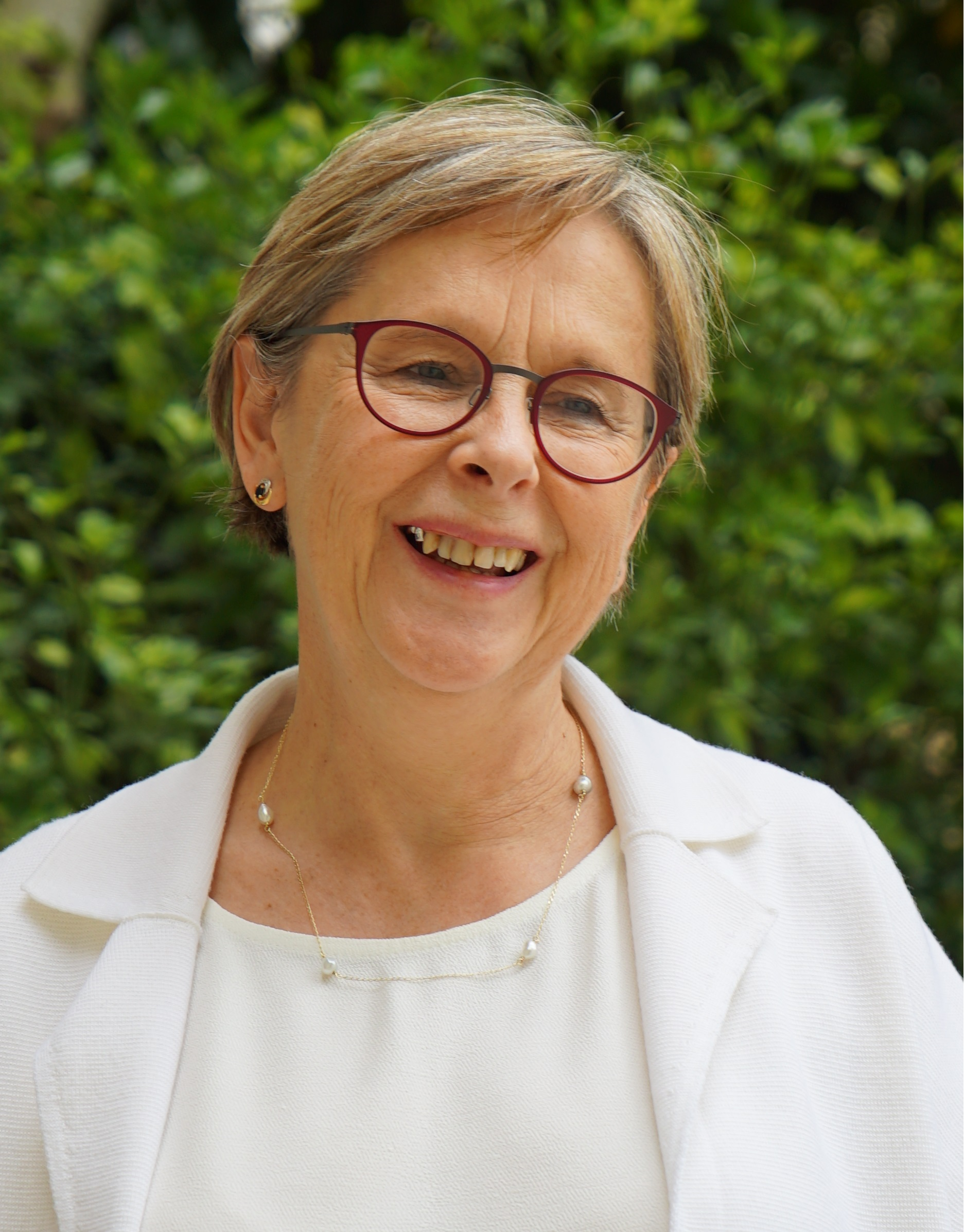
- Annie Vidal in 2017

Member of the National Assembly for Seine-Maritime's 2nd constituency
- Incumbent
- Assumed office 21 June 2017
- Preceded by: Françoise Guégot

Personal details
- Born: 17 September 1956 (age 68); La Bohalle, France
- Political party: Renaissance

Annie Vidal (born 17 September 1956) is a French politician of Renaissance who has been a member of the National Assembly since 18 June 2017, representing the department of Seine-Maritime.

== Political career ==
Vidal was first elected in the 2017 French legislative election. In parliament, Vidal serves on the Committee on Social Affairs.

She was re-elected in 2022 and 2024.

== Political positions ==
In July 2019, Vidal voted in favor of the French ratification of the European Union’s Comprehensive Economic and Trade Agreement (CETA) with Canada.

== See also ==
- List of deputies of the 15th National Assembly of France
- List of deputies of the 16th National Assembly of France
- List of deputies of the 17th National Assembly of France
