= Valérie Fourneyron =

French politician

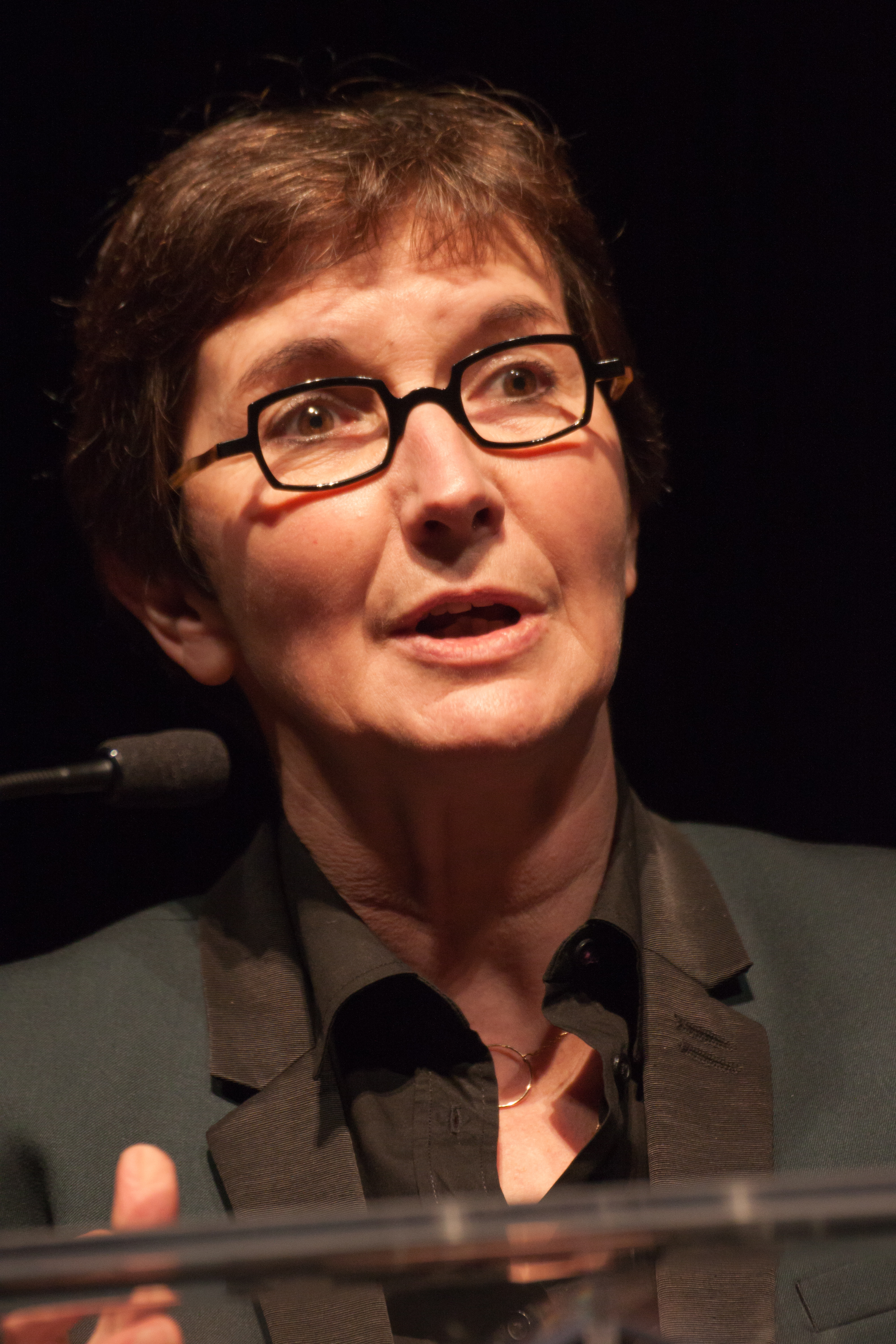
- Fourneyron in 2013

State Secretary for Crafts, Trade, Tourism and Social Economy
- In office 9 April 2014 – 14 May 2017
- President: François Hollande
- Prime Minister: Manuel Valls
- Preceded by: Sylvia Pinel (Crafts, Trade and Tourism); Benoît Hamon (Social Economy)

Minister of Sports, Youth, Popular Education and Community Life
- In office 16 May 2012 – 31 March 2014
- President: François Hollande
- Prime Minister: Jean-Marc Ayrault
- Preceded by: David Douillet (Sports); Luc Chatel (Youth and Community Life)
- Succeeded by: Najat Vallaud-Belkacem

Member of the National Assembly for Seine-Maritime's 1st constituency
- In office 20 June 2007 – 21 July 2012
- Preceded by: Patrick Herr
- Succeeded by: Pierre Léautey

Mayor of Rouen
- In office 9 March 2008 – 27 June 2012
- Preceded by: Pierre Albertini
- Succeeded by: Yvon Robert

General Councillor for the administrative district of Rouen-5
- In office 29 March 2004 – 16 March 2008
- Preceded by: Richard Picot
- Succeeded by: Christine Rambaud

Regional Councillor of Upper Normandy Regional Council
- In office 16 March 1998 – 1 July 2007
- Succeeded by: Laurence Tison

Personal details
- Born: Valérie Absire; 4 October 1959 (age 66) Le Petit-Quevilly, France
- Party: Socialist Party
- Profession: Physician

Valérie Fourneyron (French pronunciation: [valeʁi fuʁneʁɔ̃]; born 4 October 1959) is a French former politician of the Socialist Party (PS) who has been serving as chair of the board of the International Testing Agency (ITA) since 2017. She previously served as Junior Minister for Crafts, Trade, Tourism and Social Economy in the government of Prime Minister Manuel Valls from 2014 until 2017. She was also a member of the National Assembly and the Mayor of Rouen.

== Early life ==
Born to a middle-class tanner family of the area of Rouen, Valérie Absire grew up in a family with conservative views, which she shared as a teenager. At 14, she supported Valéry Giscard d'Estaing during the 1974 presidential campaign. This support was later used against her on various occasions by local political opponents. In the 1980s, her political views shifted to the left.

According to the French National Medical Council (Conseil National de l'Ordre des Médecins), Fourneyron is a medical practitioner. From 1984 to 1989, she was a sport doctor in the teaching hospital of Rouen (CHU de Rouen) and then she became a medical inspector (Médecin Inspecteur Régional Jeunesse et Sports – MIRJS).

In 1989, Fourneyron joined the Ministry of Sports where she was in charge of both the organisation and monitoring of the national sports medicine program and of the co-ordination of the Team Physicians of national sports teams. As part of her duties, Valérie Fourneyron helped draft the 1989 Anti-Doping Act. From 1991 to 1995, she was head physician of the regional center of sport medicine in Sotteville-lès-Rouen and Team physician of the French volleyball team. She was also Team Physician of the Rouen Hockey Élite 76.

== Political career ==
Fourneyron became politically active in 1995 when Yvon Robert, the Socialist candidate for the Rouen City Council, asked her to join his team. From 1995 to 2001, Valérie Fourneyron was first deputy-mayor in charge of sports and then first deputy-mayor in charge of city policy, health and security. In 1998, she was a member of an interdepartmental group that prepared a report on sports medicine and doping and she collaborated with the working group in charge of writing the new legislation regarding doping.

During the 1998 regional election, Fourneyron became vice-president of sports when she was elected to the Upper Normandy Regional Council as part of the left-wing coalition led by Alain Le Vern. She was re-elected in 2004 and remained vice-president. When she was elected to the National Assembly, she resigned from her seat in the Regional Council on 1 July 2007. She represented the French Socialist Party in the 2002 legislative election. She faced the outgoing MP Patrick Herr, representing the right party UMP, in Seine-Maritime's first constituency. She narrowly lost in the second round by 520 votes. After the campaign, she said that she was hurt by the harsh attacks against her: “I was accused of being a bad mother because I didn't stop my political career when I lost one of my sons in a scooter accident. But my children are the reasons why I decided to keep going.”

After the 2004 General Council election, Fourneyron was general councillor for the canton of Rouen-5. She resigned from her position as a municipal representative.

Fourneyron was chosen for a second time by the French Socialist Party for the 2007 legislative election. She beat the UMP candidate Bruno Devaux in the second round and she was elected with 55.16% of votes. The former MP Patrick Herr had decided not to campaign for this election. At the National Assembly, she became vice-president of the SRC in charge of sports.

In 2008, Fourneyron campaigned for the municipal election in Rouen. On 9 March, she led a left-wing coalition and won against outgoing mayor Pierre Albertini in the first round, with 55.79% of the votes. On this occasion, she became one of the few women to lead a city of more than 100,000 inhabitants. Other women who are mayors of cities this large include Hélène Mandroux, Maryse Joissains, Martine Aubry, Adeline Hazan, Dominique Voynet, and Huguette Bello. She joined the association of mayors of major French cities (Association des Maires de Grandes Villes de France – AMGVF) where she was in charge of sports-related issues.

In July 2011, Fourneyron joined Martine Aubry's campaign team, representing the French Socialist Party in the 2012 presidential election. Along with athlete Yohann Diniz, Valérie Fourneyron was responsible for sports-related issues. After the primary election, François Hollande included her in his campaign team, putting her in charge of sports-related issues for the 2012 presidential election.

On 16 May 2012, Fourneyron was appointed Minister of Sports, Youth, Popular Education and Community Life. Pierre Léautey replaced her as alternate MP after her re-election on 17 June 2012. One of François Hollande's 60 campaign promises was to prohibit MPs from holding multiple elected positions simultaneously, so this forced Fourneyron to resign from the Rouen city council. Yvon Robert took over her position on 27 June 2012.

After Jean-Marc Ayrault's resignation as a prime minister, Fourneyron was appointed as Junior Minister for Crafts, Trade, Tourism and Social Economy in Manuel Valls's Cabinet on 9 April 2014.

== World Anti-Doping Agency ==
In December 2017 the International Olympic Committee's World Anti-Doping Agency appointed Fourneyron as chair of the board of the International Testing Agency (ITA). In this capacity, she was in charge of screening Russians to judge if they can participate in the Pyeongchang Olympics. In 2016 she campaigned for a blanket ban of all Russians from international sports events.
