= 2024 French legislative election in Bouches-du-Rhône =

Following the first round of the 2024 French legislative election on 30 June 2024, runoff elections in each constituency where no candidate received a vote share greater than 50 percent were scheduled for 7 July. Candidates permitted to stand in the runoff elections needed to either come in first or second place in the first round or achieve more than 12.5 percent of the votes of the entire electorate (as opposed to 12.5 percent of the vote share due to low turnout).

== Bouches-du-Rhône ==
=== 1st constituency ===
Candidate	Party or alliance		First round		Second round	
Candidate	Party or alliance		Votes	%	Votes	%
Monique Griseti	National Rally		24,276	45.54	28,304	55.86
Pascaline Léchorché	New Popular Front	Place Publique	14,340	26.90	22,367	44.14
Sabrina Agresti-Roubache	Ensemble	Renaissance	12,585	23.61		
Salomé Moyal	Reconquête		867	1.63		
Céline Caravellazi	Sovereigntist right	Miscellaneous right	842	1.58		
Marc Cecone	Far-left	Lutte Ouvrière	402	0.75		
Total			53,312	100.00	50,671	100.00
Valid votes			53,312	97.70	50,671	93.80
Invalid votes			327	0.60	660	1.22
Blank votes			927	1.70	2,688	4.98
Total votes			54,566	100.00	54,019	100.00
Registered voters/turnout			82,792	65.91	82,816	65.23

=== 2nd constituency ===
Candidate	Party or alliance		First round		Second round	
Candidate	Party or alliance		Votes	%	Votes	%
Olivier Rioult	National Rally		18,836	32.06	24,789	46.36
Laurent Lhardit	New Popular Front	Socialist Party	16,740	28.49	28,677	53.64
Claire Pitollat	Ensemble	Renaissance	15,870	27.01		
Laure-Agnès Caradec	The Republicans		5,100	8.68		
Jean-Marc Graffeo	Reconquête		1,130	1.92		
Hugo Roche Poggi	Miscellaneous left	Independent	847	1.44		
Claudine Rodinson	Far-left	Lutte Ouvrière	229	0.39		
Total			58,752	100.00	53,466	100.00
Valid votes			58,752	98.63	53,466	92.55
Invalid votes			230	0.39	684	1.18
Blank votes			585	0.98	3,617	6.26
Total votes			59,567	100.00	57,767	100.00
Registered voters/turnout			84,440	70.54	84,461	68.39

=== 3rd constituency ===
Candidate	Party or alliance		First round		Second round	
Candidate	Party or alliance		Votes	%	Votes	%
Gisèle Lelouis	National Rally		19,938	42.75	22,869	50.93
Amine Kessaci	New Popular Front	The Ecologists	16,642	35.68	22,034	49.07
Céline Aycard-Diteste	Ensemble	Horizons	5,417	11.61		
Pierre-Olivier Koubi-Flotte	The Republicans		2,664	5.71		
Bernard Fournier	Reconquête		937	2.01		
Jacqueline Grandel	Far-left	Lutte Ouvrière	402	0.86		
Alexa de Montgolfier	Ecologists	Independent	381	0.82		
Juliette Coleou	Far-left	Independent	262	0.56		
Total			46,643	100.00	44,903	100.00
Valid votes			46,643	97.60	44,903	94.70
Invalid votes			331	0.69	531	1.12
Blank votes			817	1.71	1,982	4.18
Total votes			47,791	100.00	47,416	100.00
Registered voters/turnout			77,838	61.40	77,883	60.88

=== 4th constituency ===
Candidate	Party or alliance		Votes	%
Manuel Bompard	New Popular Front	La France Insoumise	26,712	67.49
Aurélie Quinquis	National Rally		5,973	15.09
Malika Torchi	Ensemble	Renaissance	4,370	11.04
Carime Igo	The Republicans		830	2.10
Anthony Demont	Ecologists	Independent	723	1.83
Florian Trevisan	Reconquête		323	0.82
Isabelle Bonnet	Far-left	Lutte Ouvrière	256	0.65
Leila Behairi	Ecologists	Independent	204	0.52
Stéphane Pernice	Far-left	Independent	178	0.45
Kylian Jacky Jean-Luc Visage	Independent		11	0.03
Léa Felice Ferrandi	Regionalists	Independent	1	0.00
Eva-Françoise Faye	Miscellaneous right	Independent	0	0.00
Total			39,581	100.00
Valid votes			39,581	98.10
Invalid votes			308	0.76
Blank votes			459	1.14
Total votes			40,348	100.00
Registered voters/turnout			67,303	59.95

=== 5th constituency ===
Candidate	Party or alliance		First round		Second round	
Candidate	Party or alliance		Votes	%	Votes	%
Franck Liquori	National Rally		12,938	25.77	15,638	34.05
Hendrik Davi	Miscellaneous left	Ecosocialist Left (Note: Dissident who ran without the backing of the New Popular Front)	12,271	24.44	30,287	65.95
Allan Popelard	New Popular Front	La France Insoumise	11,706	23.32		
Maxime Boudet	Ensemble	Renaissance	8,985	17.90		
Ambroise Malinconi	The Republicans		2,576	5.13		
Barthélémy Plez	Ecologists	Independent	865	1.72		
Marcel Blanc	Reconquête		598	1.19		
Nathalie Malhole	Far-left	Lutte Ouvrière	264	0.53		
Pierre-Frédéric Zieba	Independent		3	0.01		
Pauline Papazian	Regionalists	Independent	0	0.00		
Total			50,206	100.00	45,925	100.00
Valid votes			50,206	98.49	45,925	93.53
Invalid votes			297	0.58	634	1.29
Blank votes			472	0.93	2,543	5.18
Total votes			50,975	100.00	49,102	100.00
Registered voters/turnout			75,461	67.55	75,491	65.04

=== 6th constituency ===
Candidate	Party or alliance		First round		Second round	
Candidate	Party or alliance		Votes	%	Votes	%
Olivier Fayssat	Union of the far right	The Republicans	19,151	38.27	24,745	52.33
Christine Juste	New Popular Front	The Ecologists	14,119	28.22	22,537	47.67
Lionel Royer-Perreaut	Ensemble	Renaissance	12,575	25.13		
Serena Zouaghi	The Republicans		2,231	4.46		
Jeanne Astolfi	Reconquête		862	1.72		
Stéphanie Brun	Miscellaneous right	Independent	348	0.70		
Caroline Couronne	Ecologists	Independent	276	0.55		
Corinne Morel	Far-left	Lutte Ouvrière	250	0.50		
Sébastien Peretti	Independent		217	0.43		
Alain Slama	Far-right	Independent	4	0.01		
Tess Jannon	Miscellaneous centre	Independent	3	0.01		
Sylvie Giovannini	Regionalists	Independent	1	0.00		
Total			50,037	100.00	47,282	100.00
Valid votes			50,037	97.97	47,282	93.67
Invalid votes			278	0.54	603	1.19
Blank votes			757	1.48	2,594	5.14
Total votes			51,072	100.00	50,479	100.00
Registered voters/turnout			79,685	64.09	79,715	63.32

=== 7th constituency ===
Candidate	Party or alliance		Votes	%
Sébastien Delogu	New Popular Front	La France Insoumise	21,124	59.67
Arezki Selloum	National Rally		9,632	27.21
Hayat Atia	Ensemble	Renaissance	3,186	9.00
Hakim Benamrane	Miscellaneous left	Independent	660	1.86
Ines Albacete	Reconquête		481	1.36
Danièle Pécout	Far-left	Lutte Ouvrière	319	0.90
Total			35,402	100.00
Valid votes			35,402	97.87
Invalid votes			245	0.68
Blank votes			527	1.46
Total votes			36,174	100.00
Registered voters/turnout			69,089	52.36

=== 8th constituency ===
Candidate	Party or alliance		First round		Second round	
Candidate	Party or alliance		Votes	%	Votes	%
Romain Tonussi	National Rally		30,987	44.63	34,269	50.24
Jean-Marc Zulesi	Ensemble	Renaissance	18,563	26.73	33,940	49.76
Alexandre Beddock	New Popular Front	La France Insoumise	13,938	20.07		
Stéphanie Volpini	The Republicans		3,105	4.47		
Céline Fanfan	Ecologists	Independent	1,882	2.71		
Jeanne Vigier	Reconquête		617	0.89		
Rémy Bazzali	Far-left	Lutte Ouvrière	342	0.49		
Total			69,434	100.00	68,209	100.00
Valid votes			69,434	98.01	68,209	96.07
Invalid votes			516	0.73	743	1.05
Blank votes			897	1.27	2,049	2.89
Total votes			70,847	100.00	71,001	100.00
Registered voters/turnout			103,683	68.33	103,695	68.47

=== 9th constituency ===
Candidate	Party or alliance		First round		Second round	
Candidate	Party or alliance		Votes	%	Votes	%
Joëlle Mélin	National Rally		30,188	45.20	36,052	58.04
Bernard Ougourlou-Oglou	New Popular Front	Socialist Party	15,867	23.76	26,066	41.96
Bertrand Mas-Fraissinet	Ensemble	Renaissance	12,465	18.66		
Aurélien Michel	The Republicans		5,128	7.68		
Boualam Aksil	Ecologists	Independent	1,790	2.68		
Robert Santunione	Reconquête		979	1.47		
Jean-Marie Clorec	Far-left	Lutte Ouvrière	319	0.48		
Isabelle Mazzoni	Independent		50	0.07		
Total			66,786	100.00	62,118	100.00
Valid votes			66,786	97.91	62,118	92.33
Invalid votes			438	0.64	1,090	1.62
Blank votes			985	1.44	4,073	6.05
Total votes			68,209	100.00	67,281	100.00
Registered voters/turnout			101,433	67.25	101,449	66.32

=== 10th constituency ===
Candidate	Party or alliance		First round		Second round	
Candidate	Party or alliance		Votes	%	Votes	%
Jose Gonzalez	National Rally		37,672	48.83	41,372	55.66
Véronique Bourcet-Giner	Ensemble	Democratic Movement	16,619	21.54	32,960	44.34
Jimmy Bessaih	New Popular Front	La France Insoumise	16,050	20.80		
Stéphan Pierraccini	The Republicans	Independent	2,642	3.42		
Lucie Desblancs	Ecologists	Independent	2,613	3.39		
Jean-Philippe Courtaro	Reconquête		1,031	1.34		
Frédéric Kechra	Far-left	Lutte Ouvrière	314	0.41		
Hassan Tahiri	Independent		208	0.27		
Total			77,149	100.00	74,332	100.00
Valid votes			77,149	97.58	74,332	95.21
Invalid votes			625	0.79	958	1.23
Blank votes			1,286	1.63	2,782	3.56
Total votes			79,060	100.00	78,072	100.00
Registered voters/turnout			110,764	71.38	110,783	70.47

=== 11th constituency ===
Candidate	Party or alliance		First round		Second round	
Candidate	Party or alliance		Votes	%	Votes	%
Hervé Fabre-Aubrespy	National Rally		24,524	38.87	29,299	49.77
Marc Pena	New Popular Front	Socialist Party	17,374	27.54	29,570	50.23
Mohamed Laqhila	Ensemble	Democratic Movement	16,581	26.28		
Fayçal Zerguine	The Republicans		2,562	4.06		
Michel Bayle	Sovereigntist right	Independent	837	1.33		
Jean-François Mebtouche	Reconquête		835	1.32		
Charlotte Maria	Far-left	Lutte Ouvrière	382	0.61		
Total			63,095	100.00	58,869	100.00
Valid votes			63,095	97.67	58,869	92.19
Invalid votes			392	0.61	905	1.42
Blank votes			1,111	1.72	4,084	6.40
Total votes			64,598	100.00	63,858	100.00
Registered voters/turnout			93,649	68.98	93,657	68.18

=== 12th constituency ===
Candidate	Party or alliance		Votes	%
Franck Allisio	National Rally		33,086	54.07
Maryline Czurka	New Popular Front	Socialist Party	14,746	24.10
Axel Breton	Ensemble	Democratic Movement	8,508	13.90
Maxime Aghemo	The Republicans		3,456	5.65
Raymonde Zini	Reconquête		836	1.37
François Roche	Far-left	Lutte Ouvrière	561	0.92
Total			61,193	100.00
Valid votes			61,193	97.41
Invalid votes			330	0.53
Blank votes			1,296	2.06
Total votes			62,819	100.00
Registered voters/turnout			95,365	65.87

=== 13th constituency ===
Candidate	Party or alliance		First round		Second round	
Candidate	Party or alliance		Votes	%	Votes	%
Emmanuel Fouquart	National Rally		27,908	47.53	31,084	52.87
Pierre Dharréville	New Popular Front	Communist Party	21,147	36.02	27,707	47.13
Lila Lokmane	Ensemble	Renaissance	7,239	12.33		
Hervé Delespaul	Sovereigntist right	Debout la France	934	1.59		
Olympe Scheredre	Reconquête		876	1.49		
Cyril Metral	Far-left	Lutte Ouvrière	613	1.04		
Total			58,717	100.00	58,791	100.00
Valid votes			58,717	96.63	58,791	94.90
Invalid votes			714	1.18	910	1.47
Blank votes			1,332	2.19	2,249	3.63
Total votes			60,763	100.00	61,950	100.00
Registered voters/turnout			94,838	64.07	94,828	65.33

=== 14th constituency ===
Candidate	Party or alliance		First round		Second round	
Candidate	Party or alliance		Votes	%	Votes	%
Gérault Verny	Union of the far right	The Republicans	21,734	31.65	25,880	37.26
Jean-David Ciot	New Popular Front	Socialist Party	20,242	29.48	25,022	36.03
Anne-Laurence Petel	Ensemble	Renaissance	19,853	28.91	18,553	26.71
Gaëtan Muselet	The Republicans		3,869	5.63		
Dominique Sassoon	Ecologists	Independent	1,010	1.47		
Charles Moyal	Reconquête		827	1.20		
Mireille Dufay	Sovereigntist right	Debout la France	635	0.92		
Anne Roche	Far-left	Lutte Ouvrière	470	0.68		
Baptiste Bouckenhove	Miscellaneous right	Independent	30	0.04		
Total			68,670	100.00	69,455	100.00
Valid votes			68,670	97.78	69,455	97.88
Invalid votes			439	0.63	389	0.55
Blank votes			1,118	1.59	1,116	1.57
Total votes			70,227	100.00	70,960	100.00
Registered voters/turnout			99,986	70.24	99,995	70.96

=== 15th constituency ===
Candidate	Party or alliance		First round		Second round	
Candidate	Party or alliance		Votes	%	Votes	%
Stéphane Hermelin	National Rally		37,493	49.48	43,745	65.18
Wassila Aïdarous	New Popular Front	La France Insoumise	15,314	20.21	23,368	34.82
Solange Ponchon	Ensemble	Renaissance	12,202	16.10		
Stéphane Hermelin	The Republicans		8,272	10.92		
Martine Elesikian	Reconquête		1,414	1.87		
Anne Testut	Far-left	Lutte Ouvrière	617	0.81		
Christophe Ptak	Independent		457	0.60		
Total			75,769	100.00	67,113	100.00
Valid votes			75,769	96.98	67,113	87.86
Invalid votes			634	0.81	2,007	2.63
Blank votes			1,726	2.21	7,270	9.52
Total votes			78,129	100.00	76,390	100.00
Registered voters/turnout			110,706	70.57	110,725	68.99

=== 16th constituency ===
Candidate	Party or alliance		First round		Second round	
Candidate	Party or alliance		Votes	%	Votes	%
Emmanuel Taché de la Pagerie	National Rally		28,179	47.12	32,359	56.13
Nicolas Koukas	New Popular Front	Communist Party	17,896	29.92	25,296	43.87
Marion Biscione	Ensemble	Renaissance	8,900	14.88		
Alain Bernardet	The Republicans		3,217	5.38		
Florent Seddik	Reconquête		712	1.19		
Guy Dubost	Far-left	Lutte Ouvrière	505	0.84		
Samir Bouziani	Ecologists	Independent	396	0.66		
Total			59,805	100.00	57,655	100.00
Valid votes			59,805	97.15	57,655	92.74
Invalid votes			667	1.08	1,233	1.98
Blank votes			1,088	1.77	3,283	5.28
Total votes			61,560	100.00	62,171	100.00
Registered voters/turnout			91,707	67.13		
