= 2008 Marseille municipal election =

Municipal and mayoral elections were held in Marseille in March 2008, at the same time as other French municipal elections. The incumbent mayor of the city, Jean-Claude Gaudin (UMP) faced Socialist candidate and Senator Jean-Noël Guérini. While polls in January and February indicated that Gaudin was safe, later polls showed the race tied and the 3rd sector of the city, a marginal UMP area, was likely to decide the election. Elections in Marseille depend not on the number of votes polled but the number of sectors won (there are eight sectors). The same system applies in Lyon and Paris.

Gaudin was re-elected and served as mayor until 2020.

== Results ==
=== 1st Sector ===
Municipal election 2008: 1st Sector
Party	Candidate	Votes	%	±%
UMP	Jean Roatta	10,069	39.94%	
PS	Patrick Mennucci	9,886	39.21%	
LCR	Armelle Chevassu	1,909	7.57%	
FN	Jackie Blanc	1,671	6.63%	
MoDem	Childeric Muller	1,533	6.08%	
DVD	Stéphanie Brun Pothin	145	0.58%	
Turnout		25,801		
PS	Patrick Mennucci	13,949	50.74%	
UMP	Jean Roatta	13,544	49.26%	
Turnout		28,300		
PS gain from UMP		Swing		

=== 2nd Sector ===
Municipal election 2008: 2nd Sector
Party	Candidate	Votes	%	±%
PS	Lisette Narducci	8,892	54.90%	
UMP	Jacques Rocca-Serra	4,262	26.32%	
FN	Roland Lombardi	1,439	8.88%	
LCR	Emmanuel Arvois	987	6.09%	
MoDem	Florence Bistagne	616	3.80%	
Turnout		16,664		
PS hold		Swing		

=== 3rd Sector ===
Municipal election 2008: 3rd Sector
Party	Candidate	Votes	%	±%
UMP	Renaud Muselier	13,630	42.16%	
PS	Jean-Noël Guérini	12,127	37.51%	
MoDem	Christophe Madrolle	2,038	6.30%	
FN	Gilda Mih	2,030	6.28%	
LCR	Camille Roux-Moumane	1,867	5.77%	
MNR	Hubert Savon	316	0.98%	
MPF	Nicole Cantrel	197	0.61%	
Workers' Party	Corinne Raynaud	131	0.41%	
Turnout		33,022		
UMP	Renaud Muselier	17,761	51.43%	
PS	Jean-Noël Guérini	16,776	48.57%	
Turnout		35,590		
UMP hold		Swing		

=== 4th Sector ===
Municipal election 2008: 4th Sector
Party	Candidate	Votes	%	±%
UMP	Jean-Claude Gaudin	23,600	52.09%	
PS	François Franceschi	12,895	28.46%	
MoDem	Jean-Luc Bennahmias	3,511	7.75%	
FN	Mireille Barde	2,927	6.46%	
LCR	Louis-Michel Pirrottina	2,376	5.24%	
Turnout		46,290		
UMP hold		Swing		

=== 5th Sector ===
Municipal election 2008: 5th Sector
Party	Candidate	Votes	%	±%
UMP	Guy Teissier	21,493	48.81%	
PS	René Olmeta	14,097	32.01%	
FN	Laurent Comas	4,116	9.35%	
MoDem	Patrick Zaoui	2,546	5.78%	
LCR	Nicole Colomb	1,784	4.05%	
Turnout		44,841		
UMP	Guy Teissier	27,343	58.68%	
PS	René Olmeta	19,257	41.32%	
Turnout		47,905		
UMP hold		Swing		

=== 6th Sector ===
Municipal election 2008: 6th Sector
Party	Candidate	Votes	%	±%
UMP	Roland Blum	18,014	43.38%	
PS	Christophe Masse	15,874	38.22%	
FN	Stéphane Durbec	3,627	8.73%	
MoDem	Jeanne Nobile	2,064	4.97%	
LCR	Bruno Malvezin	1,514	3.65%	
MNR	Francis Belotti	292	0.70%	
Workers' Party	Jacky Rouviere	144	0.35%	
Turnout		42,391		
UMP	Roland Blum	24,661	54.39%	
PS	Christophe Masse	20,676	45.61%	
Turnout		46,673		
UMP hold		Swing		

=== 7th Sector ===
Municipal election 2008: 7th Sector
Party	Candidate	Votes	%	±%
PS	Sylvie Andrieux	19,462	47.38%	
UMP	Valérie Boyer	13,250	32.26%	
FN	Stéphane Ravier	4,847	11.80%	
MoDem	Mohamed Laqhila	1,579	3.84%	
LCR	Babette Joshua	1,459	3.55%	
MPF	Jean-Claude Le Page	477	1.16%	
Turnout		42,135		
PS	Sylvie Andrieux	24,525	54.06%	
UMP	Valérie Boyer	17,200	37.91%	
FN	Stéphane Ravier	3,642	8.03%	
Turnout		46,357		
PS hold		Swing		

=== 8th Sector ===
Municipal election 2008: 8th Sector
Party	Candidate	Votes	%	±%
PS	Samia Ghali	11,643	52.30%	
UMP	Bernard Susini	5,612	25.21%	
FN	Bernard Marandat	2,818	12.66%	
LCR	Henri Saint-Jean	1,021	4.59%	
MoDem	Saïd Ahamada	957	4.30%	
Workers' Party	Daniel Rogier	209	0.94%	
Turnout		23,007		
PS gain from PCF		Swing		

== See also ==
- 2008 French municipal elections
- 2008 Paris municipal election
- 2008 Lyon municipal election
