= Bouches-du-Rhône's 7th constituency =

Constituency of the National Assembly of France

7th constituency of Bouches-du-Rhône
- inline Constituency of the National Assembly of France

- Constituency in Bouches-du-Rhône Department (white area is the Étang de Berre lagoon)

- Bouches-du-Rhône in France
- Deputy: Sébastien Delogu; LFI
- Department: Bouches-du-Rhône

The 7th constituency of Bouches-du-Rhône is a French legislative constituency in Bouches-du-Rhône.

== Deputies ==
Election	Member	Party
1997	Sylvie Andrieux	PS
2002	Sylvie Andrieux	PS
2007	Sylvie Andrieux	PS
2012	Henri Jibrayel	PS
2017	Saïd Ahamada	LREM
2022	Sébastien Delogu	LFI
2024	Sébastien Delogu	LFI

== Elections ==
=== 2024 ===
Candidate	Party	Alliance	First round			Second round		
Candidate	Party	Alliance	Votes	%	+/–	Votes	%	+/–
Sébastien Delogu	LFI	NFP	21,124	59.67	+21.79			
Arezki Selloum	RN		9,632	27.21	+4.02			
Hayat Atia	RE	Ensemble	3,186	9.00	-6.80			
Hakim Benamrane	DVG		660	1.86	new			
Ines Albacete	REC		481	1.36	-3.56			
Danièle Pécout	LO		319	0.90	-0.11			
Votes			35,402	100.00				
Valid votes			35,402	97.87	+0.21			
Blank votes			527	1.46	-0.13			
Null votes			245	0.68	-0.07			
Turnout			36,174	52.36	+24.56			
Abstentions			32,915	47.64	-24.56			
Registered voters			69,089					
Result			LFI HOLD					

=== 2022 ===
Legislative Election 2022: Bouches-du-Rhône's 7th constituency
Party	Candidate	Votes	%	±%
LFI (NUPÉS)	Sébastien Delogu	6,904	37.88	-4.43
RN	Arezki Selloum	4,226	23.19	+0.13
LREM (Ensemble)	Saïd Ahamada	2,879	15.80	−4.06
DIV	Nourdine Chabouni	1,058	5.81	N/A
REC	Lorenzo Longo	897	4.92	N/A
DVG	Ali Amouche	730	4.01	N/A
DVE	Sandrine Bove	421	2.31	N/A
Others	N/A	1,110		
Turnout		18,662	27.80	−4.81
2nd round result
LFI (NUPÉS)	Sébastien Delogu	11,960	64.68	N/A
RN	Arezki Selloum	6,531	35.32	−6.29
Turnout		18,491	28.89	+1.25
LFI gain from LREM				

=== 2017 ===
Candidate	Label	First round		Second round	
Candidate	Label	Votes	%	Votes	%
Sophie Grech	FN	4,789	23.06	6,996	41.61
Saïd Ahamada	REM	4,125	19.86	9,818	58.39
Henri Jibrayel	PS	3,511	16.91		
Ouali Brinis	FI	3,064	14.75		
Jean-Marc Coppola	PCF	1,661	8.00		
Arlette Fructus	UDI	1,121	5.40		
Lydia Frentzel	ECO	551	2.65		
Haouaria Hadj-Chikh	DVG	533	2.57		
Jean-Marc Corteggiani	DLF	362	1.74		
Nadia Zidane	DIV	288	1.39		
Emea-Brigitte Vlaemynck	ECO	235	1.13		
Danièle Pécout	EXG	188	0.91		
Albert Voguie	ECO	112	0.54		
Youssouf Mohamed	ECO	102	0.49		
Martine Dupuy	EXG	95	0.46		
Katia Yakoubi	DVG	31	0.15		
Votes		20,768	100.00	16,814	100.00
Valid votes		20,768	97.32	16,814	92.94
Blank votes		446	2.09	967	5.35
Null votes		127	0.60	310	1.71
Turnout		21,341	32.61	18,091	27.64
Abstentions		44,109	67.39	47,353	72.36
Registered voters		65,450		65,444	
Source: Ministry of the Interior

=== 2012 ===
Summary of the 10 June and 17 June 2012 French legislative election in Bouches-du-Rhône’s 7th Constituency
Candidate	Party		1st round		2nd round	
Candidate	Party		Votes	%	Votes	%
Henri Jibrayel	Socialist Party	PS	8,244	27.51%	17,034	62.34%
Bernard Marandat	Front National	FN	7,098	23.69%	10,292	37.66%
Karim Zeribi	Europe Ecology – The Greens	EELV	6,450	21.53%		
Jean-Marc Coppola	Left Front	FG	3,482	11.62%		
Sonia Leon	New Centre-Presidential Majority	NCE	2,484	8.29%		
Claude Nassur	Miscellaneous Left	DVG	493	1.65%		
Salim Laïbi	Other	AUT	241	0.80%		
Zoubida Meguenni	Far Left	EXG	230	0.77%		
Nadia Maoudj	Ecologist	ECO	213	0.71%		
Michèle Carayon	Far Right	EXD	199	0.66%		
Eddy Camilleri	Other	AUT	150	0.50%		
Michèle Latil		CEN	144	0.48%		
Danièle Pecout	Far Left	EXG	138	0.46%		
Pierre Bonnet	Miscellaneous Left	DVG	96	0.32%		
Mourad Goual	Miscellaneous Right	DVD	93	0.31%		
Ayette Boudelaa	Ecologist	ECO	76	0.25%		
Claire Aymes	Miscellaneous Right	DVD	68	0.23%		
Chérif Fahem	Miscellaneous Left	DVG	63	0.21%		
Madga Hadji	Miscellaneous Left	DVG	1	0.00%		
Nabil Kadri	Radical Party of the Left	PRG	0	0.00%		
Total			29,963	100%	27,326	100%
Registered voters			63,082		63,071	
Blank/Void ballots			477	1.57%	1,227	4.30%
Turnout			30,440	48.25%	28,553	45.27%
Abstentions			32,642	51.75%	34,518	54.73%
Result					PS HOLD	

=== 2007 ===
Summary of the 10 June and 17 June 2007 French legislative election in Bouches-du-Rhône’s 7th Constituency
Candidate	Party		1st round		2nd round	
Candidate	Party		Votes	%	Votes	%
Sylvie Andrieux	Socialist Party	PS	10,002	38.59%	14,874	57.79%
Nora Remadnia Preziosi	Union for a Popular Movement	UMP	7,865	30.34%	10,866	42.21%
Stéphane Ravier	Front National	FN	3,066	11.83%		
Haouaria Hadj Chikh	Communist	PCF	1,373	5.30%		
Mohamed Laqhila	Democratic Movement	MoDem	969	3.74%		
Camille Roux	Far Left	EXG	507	1.96%		
Nicole Cantrel	Movement for France	MPF	460	1.77%		
Claude Nassur	Miscellaneous Left	DVG	332	1.28%		
Flora Boulay	The Greens	VEC	329	1.27%		
Alain Vauzelle	Far Right	EXD	295	1.14%		
Josiane Giordano	Ecologist	ECO	201	0.78%		
Hassan Benamar	Miscellaneous Right	DVD	185	0.71%		
Danièle Pecout	Far Left	EXG	167	0.64%		
Aimé Guenoun	Ecologist	ECO	102	0.39%		
Isabelle Kurbetz	Independent	DIV	66	0.25%		
Total			25,919	100%	25,740	100%
Registered voters			52,038		52,030	
Blank/Void ballots			484	1.83%	792	2.99%
Turnout			26,403	50.74%	26,532	50.99%
Abstentions			25,635	49.26%	25,498	49.01%
Result					PS HOLD	

=== 2002 ===
Legislative Election 2002: Bouches-du-Rhône's 7th constituency
Party	Candidate	Votes	%	±%
PS	Sylvie Andrieux	9,514	36.01	
FN	Stephane Ravier	6,869	26.00	
UMP	Marie-Jeanne Fay Bocognani	4,984	18.87	
Far left	Charles Hoareau	1,117	4.23	
MNR	Hubert Fayard	1,108	4.19	
DVG	Lucien Weygand	781	2.96	
Others	N/A	2,044		
Turnout		26,871	57.60	
2nd round result
PS	Sylvie Andrieux	14,105	63.07	
FN	Stephane Ravier	8,259	36.93	
Turnout		23,516	50.42	
PS hold				

=== 1997 ===
Legislative Election 1997: Bouches-du-Rhône's 7th constituency
Party	Candidate	Votes	%	±%
FN	Maurice Gros	8,744	31.23	
PS	Sylvie Andrieux	6,614	23.62	
PCF	Francis Caccinttolo	5,309	18.96	
RPR	Bernard Leccia	4,357	15.56	
GE	Sylvie Ingoglia	900	3.21	
LO	Danièle Pecout	626	2.24	
Others	N/A	1,449		
Turnout		28,735	61.17	
2nd round result
PS	Sylvie Andrieux	16,730	57.62	
FN	Maurice Gros	12,305	42.38	
Turnout		30,810	65.59	
PS hold				
