= Marc Pena =

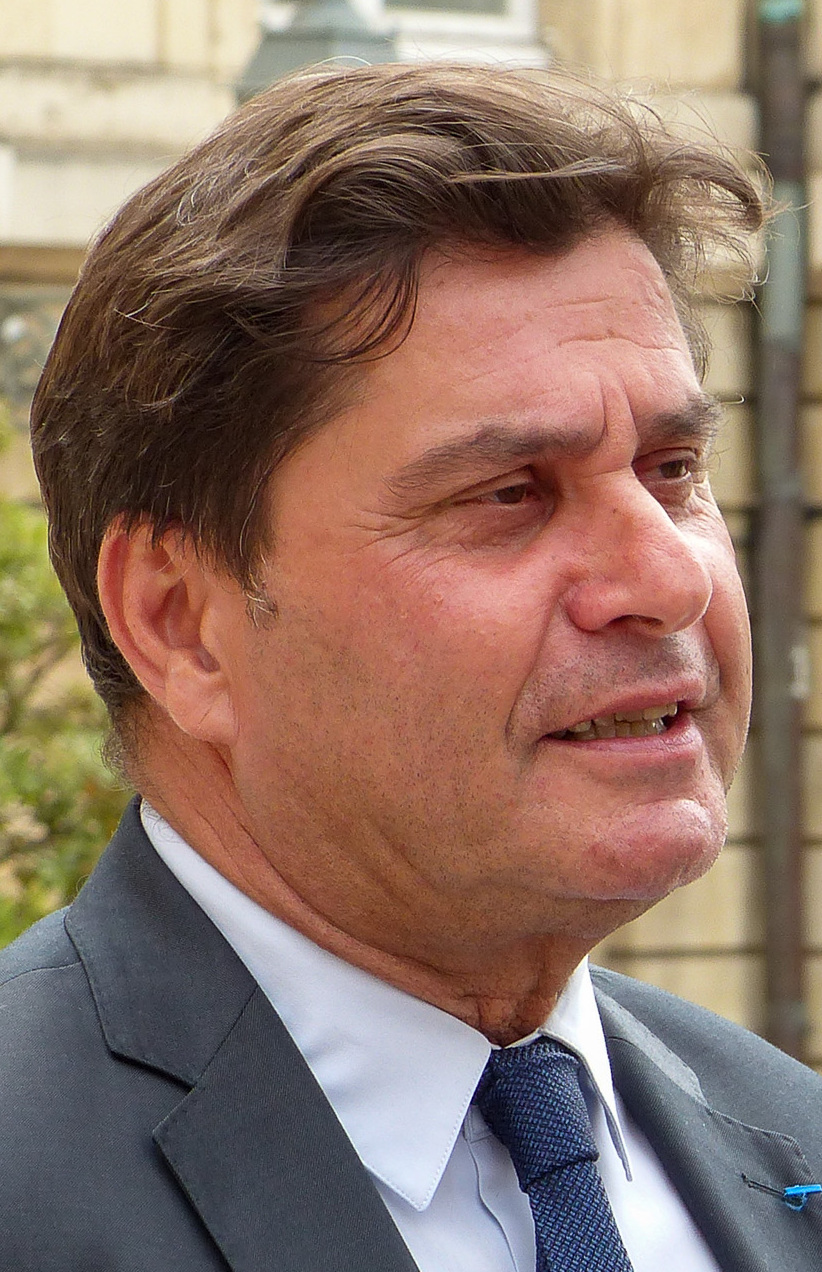

Member of the National Assembly for Bouches-du-Rhône's 11th constituency
- Incumbent
- Assumed office 8 July 2024
- Preceded by: Mohamed Laqhila

Personal details
- Born: 7 May 1960 (age 66) Marseille, France
- Party: Socialist
- Education: Aix-Marseille University

Marc Pena (born 7 May 1960) is a French academic and politician. During the 2020 French municipal elections, he led the "Aix en Partage" list, supported by the PS, of which he is a member, the PCF, LFI and Génération·s. Coming third in the second round, he was elected municipal and metropolitan councilor of Aix-en-Provence.

In 2024, during the early legislative elections he was elected deputy for Bouches-du-Rhône's 11th constituency. He sits on the Law Committee of the National Assembly.

== Biography ==
=== Youth and professional career ===
Marc Pena is from Marseille.

His parents were Spanish immigrants. His paternal grandfather and grandmother were Republicans and fought against Francoism in the Spanish Civil War. His grandmother was imprisoned.

He studied law at the Faculty of Aix, where he was active in the UNEF, and became a legal historian. He obtained his doctorate in 1989 and his agrégation in 1996.

As the Dean of the Faculty of Law of Aix-Marseille from 2004, he contributed with his peers to the establishment of the single university (Aix-Marseille University) and was, during the transition period, president of the Paul-Cezanne University (2008-2012) and of the Research and Higher Education Center bringing together the three entities within the framework of the merger. In 2012, Yvon Berland was preferred to him to take the presidency of the new University of Aix-Marseille. Marc Pena is however vice-president until 2016.

He still teaches the History of Law at the University of Aix-Marseille.

=== Political involvement ===
His first political fight after his student years was elected to the UNEF, which he led in 2002 by supporting Jean-Pierre Chevènement's campaign for the 2002 French presidential election. He was the departmental representative of the Citizens' Movement.

During the 2020 municipal campaign in Aix-en-Provence, the "Aix en Partage" collective - including the PS, the PCF, Génération.s and LFI - designated him as leader as a non-party representative of civil society. The list he led came third in the first round, with 15.88% of the vote. Between the two rounds, he refused an alliance with La République en Marche against the outgoing mayor of Les Républicains, Maryse Joissains-Masini, and maintained his candidacy. Maryse Joissains-Masini was re-elected with 43.5% of the vote, ahead of Anne-Laurence Petel (LREM at 32.12%) and Marc Pena (24.34%). Marc Pena then became a municipal and metropolitan councilor, sitting in the ranks of the opposition.

In the 2024 French legislative election in Bouches-du-Rhône, Marc Pena was the candidate of the New Popular Front in Bouches-du-Rhône's 11th constituency, which includes part of Aix-en-Provence. In the first round, he gathered 27.54% of the votes, behind Hervé Fabre-Aubrespy of the National Rally (38.87%) but ahead of the outgoing deputy of Ensemble Mohamed Laqhila (26.38%). Benefiting from the latter's withdrawal due to the triangular election, he was narrowly elected deputy with 50.23% of the votes. The day after his election, he joined the Socialist Party.

In the National Assembly, he sits on the Committee on Constitutional Laws, Legislation and General Administration of the Republic.

== Election results ==
=== Municipal elections ===
Year	Party	Commune	1st ^{round}			2nd ^{round}		
Year	Party	Commune	Votes	%	Rank	Votes	%	Issue
2020	Aix en partage (UG)	Aix-en-Provence	4,986	15.88	3rd	7,250	24.34	3rd

=== Legislative elections ===
Year	Party	Commune	1st ^{round}			2nd ^{round}		
Year	Party	Commune	Votes	%	Rank	Votes	%	Issue
2024	NFP-PS	Bouches-du-Rhône's 11th constituency	17,374	27.54	2nd	29,570	50.23	Elected

== See also ==
- List of deputies of the 17th National Assembly of France
