= Roatta =

Roatta is an Italian surname.

== Geographical distribution ==
As of 2014, 34.3% of all known bearers of the surname Roatta were residents of France (frequency 1:240,969), 33.7% of Italy (1:225,589), 26.3% of Argentina (1:201,620), 2.2% of the United States (1:20,069,515) and 2.0% of Brazil (1:12,782,012).

In Italy, the frequency of the surname was higher than national average (1:225,589) in the following regions:

1. Piedmont (1:21,281)
2. Liguria (1:28,704)

In Argentina, the frequency of the surname was higher than national average (1:201,620) in the following provinces:

1. Santa Fe Province (1:38,558)
2. Córdoba Province (1:42,842)
3. Mendoza Province (1:168,800)
4. Catamarca Province (1:197,372)

In France, the frequency of the surname was higher than national average (1:240,969) only in one region: Provence-Alpes-Côte d'Azur (1:22,113).

== People ==
- Jean Roatta, French politician
- Mario Roatta, Italian general
