= Bouches-du-Rhône's 3rd constituency =

Constituency of the National Assembly of France

3rd constituency of Bouches-du-Rhône
- inline Constituency of the National Assembly of France

- Constituency in Bouches-du-Rhône Department (white area is the Étang de Berre lagoon)

- Bouches-du-Rhône in France
- Deputy: Gisèle Lelouis; RN
- Department: Bouches-du-Rhône

The 3rd constituency of Bouches-du-Rhône is a French legislative constituency in Bouches-du-Rhône. It covers the area to the north east of the city of Marseille

== Deputies ==
Election	Member	Party	Notes
1993	Jean Roatta	UDF	
1997	Jean Roatta	UDF	
2002	Jean Roatta	UMP	
2007	Jean Roatta	UMP	
2012	Sylvie Andrieux	PS	
2013	Sylvie Andrieux	NI	Excluded from PS after conviction of misappropriation of public funds. Excluded from assembly in November 2016.
2017	Alexandra Louis	LREM	
2022	Gisèle Lelouis	RN	
2024	Gisèle Lelouis	RN	

== Elections ==
=== 2024 ===
Candidate	Party	Alliance	First round			Second round		
Candidate	Party	Alliance	Votes	%	+/–	Votes	%	+/–
Gisèle Lelouis	RN		19,938	42.75	+17.41	22,869	50.93	-4.03
Amine Kessaci	LE	NFP	16,642	35.68	+7.95	22,034	49.07	+4.03
Céline Aycard-Dieste	HOR	Ensemble	5,417	11.61	-10.26			
Pierre-Olivier Koubi-Flotte	LR	UDC	2,664	5.71	+2.12			
Bernard Fournier	REC		937	2.01	-13.21			
Jacqueline Grandel	LO		402	0.86	-0.18			
Alexia de Montgolfier	ECO		381	0.82				
Juliette Coleou	EXG		262	0.56				
Votes			46,643	100.00		44,903	100.00	
Valid votes			46,643	97.60	-0.52	44,903	94.70	+2.55
Blank votes			817	1.71	+0.31	1,982	4.18	-2.01
Null votes			331	0.69	+0.21	531	1.12	-0.54
Turnout			47,791	61.40	+24.26	47,416	60.88	+23.72
Abstentions			30,047	38.60	-24.26	30,467	39.12	-23.72
Registered voters			77,838			77,883		
Result			RN HOLD					

=== 2022 ===
Legislative Election 2022: Bouches-du-Rhône's 3rd constituency
Party	Candidate	Votes	%	±%
LFI (NUPÉS)	Mohamed Bensaada	7,678	27.73	+3.12
RN	Gisèle Lelouis	7,016	25.34	−5.50
Agir (Ensemble)	Alexandra Louis	6,056	21.87	−3.02
REC	Sandrine D'Angio	4,215	15.22	N/A
LR (UDC)	Patrick Pappalardo	995	3.59	−9.32
DVE	Nadia Si Ahmed	672	2.43	+0.73
Others	N/A	1,054		
Turnout		28,216	37.14	−3.53
2nd round result
RN	Gisèle Lelouis	14,300	54.96	+7.38
LFI (NUPÉS)	Mohamed Bensaada	11,718	45.04	N/A
Turnout		26,018	37.16	+1.67
RN gain from LREM				

=== 2017 ===
Candidate	Label	First round		Second round	
Candidate	Label	Votes	%	Votes	%
Stéphane Ravier	FN	9,024	30.84	11,641	47.58
Alexandra Louis	REM	7,284	24.89	12,826	52.42
Sarah Soilihi	FI	5,403	18.47		
Richard Miron	LR	3,778	12.91		
Anne Di Marino	PS	1,306	4.46		
Karim Mouaci	ECO	493	1.68		
Sabrina Morganti	ECO	467	1.60		
Antoine Maggio	EXD	364	1.24		
Simone Charin	DLF	314	1.07		
Jacqueline Grandel	EXG	244	0.83		
Farid Zidane	DIV	206	0.70		
Victor Hugo Espinosa	DVG	120	0.41		
Fatou Moumini	DVG	82	0.28		
Karine Harouche	EXD	79	0.27		
Anne Ceccaldi	REG	77	0.26		
Djara Sali	ECO	19	0.06		
Christophe Masse	DVG	0	0.00		
Votes		29,260	100.00	24,467	100.00
Valid votes		29,260	97.89	24,467	93.80
Blank votes		421	1.41	1,219	4.67
Null votes		211	0.71	398	1.53
Turnout		29,892	40.67	26,084	35.49
Abstentions		43,611	59.33	47,413	64.51
Registered voters		73,503		73,497	
Source: Ministry of the Interior

=== 2012 ===
Summary of the 10 June and 17 June 2012 French legislative election in Bouches-du-Rhône’s 3rd Constituency
Candidate	Party		1st round		2nd round	
Candidate	Party		Votes	%	Votes	%
Sylvie Andrieux	Socialist Party	PS	10,948	29.80%	17,962	50.99%
Stéphane Ravier	National Front	FN	10,975	29.87%	17,263	49.01%
Nora Preziosi	Union for a Popular Movement	UMP	7,425	20.21%		
Marie Batoux	Left Front	FG	4,110	11.19%		
Michèle Poncet-Ramade	The Greens	VEC	1,120	3.05%		
Anne-Marie Tapiero		CEN	474	1.29%		
Gisèle Auriemma	Ecologist	ECO	418	1.14%		
Mohyiddine Alabane	Other	AUT	282	0.77%		
Hubert Savon	Far Right	EXD	276	0.75%		
Victor Hugo Espinosa	Far Left	EXG	188	0.51%		
Nouriati Djambae	Ecologist	ECO	181	0.49%		
Isabelle Bonnet	Far Left	EXG	179	0.49%		
Simone Charin	Miscellaneous Right	DVD	163	0.44%		
Total			36,739	100%	35,225	100%
Registered voters			70,351		70,329	
Blank/Void ballots			679	1.81%	2,066	5.54%
Turnout			37,418	53.19%	37,291	53.02%
Abstentions			32,933	46.81%	33,038	46.98%
Result					PS GAIN	

=== 2007 ===
Summary of the 10 June and 17 June 2007 French legislative in Bouches-du-Rhône’s 3rd Constituency election results
Candidate	Party		1st round		2nd round	
Candidate	Party		Votes	%	Votes	%
Jean Roatta	Union for a Popular Movement	UMP	10,758	40.76%	12,548	50.50%
Patrick Mennucci	Socialist Party	PS	7,732	29.30%	12,300	49.50%
Miloud Boualem	Democratic Movement	MoDem	1,935	7.33%		
Jackie Blanc	National Front	FN	1,691	6.41%		
Jean-Paul Israel	Communist	COM	1,087	4.12%		
Emmanuel Arvois	Far Left	EXG	864	3.27%		
Marianne Moukomel Clarte	The Greens	VEC	849	3.22%		
Josette Mercier	Ecologist	ECO	368	1.39%		
Alain Persia	Miscellaneous Right	DVD	323	1.22%		
Roland Lombardi	Movement for France	MPF	262	0.99%		
Isabelle Bonnet	Far Left	EXG	181	0.69%		
Roland Dicchi	Far Right	EXD	135	0.51%		
Daniel Youssoufian	Divers	DIV	115	0.44%		
Stéphanie Pothin	Miscellaneous Right	DVD	63	0.24%		
Claire Aymes	Divers	DIV	28	0.11%		
Patrick Sinegre	Divers	DIV	1	0.00%		
Total			26,392	100%	24,848	100%
Registered voters			46,659		46,648	
Blank/Void ballots			336	1.26%	872	3.39%
Turnout			26,728	57.28%	25,720	55.14%
Abstentions			19,931	42.72%	20,928	44.86%
Result					UMP HOLD	

=== 2002 ===
Legislative Election 2002: Bouches-du-Rhône's 3rd constituency
Party	Candidate	Votes	%	±%
UMP	Jean Roatta	9,438	36.28	
PS	Gabriel Malauzat	5,674	21.81	
FN	Jackie Blanc	4,890	18.80	
DVG	Philippe Sanmarco	1,307	5.02	
PCF	Jean-Paul Nostriano	1,238	4.76	
LV	Yannick Lopez	619	2.38	
DVD	Guy Jullien	580	2.23	
LCR	Samuel Joshua	571	2.19	
Others	N/A	1,700		
Turnout		26,387	61.22	
2nd round result
UMP	Jean Roatta	12,595	57.17	
PS	Gabriel Malauzat	9,436	42.83	
Turnout		23,284	54.03	
UMP gain from UDF				

=== 1997 ===
Legislative Election 1997: Bouches-du-Rhône's 3rd constituency
Party	Candidate	Votes	%	±%
UDF	Jean Roatta	7,450	29.04	
FN	Daniel Gazzola	6,197	24.16	
PS	Jean-Noël Guérini	6,187	24.12	
PCF	Jean-Paul Nostriano	2,462	9.60	
GE	Abderrhamane Tabet	754	2.94	
LO	Patrick Grenier	628	2.45	
DVG	Robert Vigouroux	572	2.23	
Others	N/A	1,405		
Turnout		26,392	60.38	
2nd round result
UDF	Jean Roatta	12,050	41.71	
PS	Jean-Noël Guérini	11,766	40.73	
FN	Daniel Gazzola	5,075	17.57	
Turnout		29,551	67.61	
UDF hold				
