= 2008 Lyon municipal election =

Municipal and mayoral elections were held in Lyon in March 2008, at the same time as other municipal elections. The then-current mayor of Lyon Gérard Collomb (PS) should have faced UMP candidate Dominique Perben and MoDem candidate Christophe Geourjon, who finally chose to join the Perben list. Azouz Begag declined to seek the MoDem nomination. Another MoDem candidate was selected by François Bayrou a month before the elections as head of the MoDem list to replace Geourjon and other defectors both to the UMP-led and the PS-led lists.

In the 2001 French municipal elections, the Socialist Gérard Collomb won the country's second largest city from the UDF. Lyon had been considered a stronghold for the centrist UDF in previous years. In 2008, former UMP Transportation Minister Dominique Perben tried to win back the city. Surprisingly, the two highly presumed candidates for the centrist MoDem and the far-right National Front, Azouz Begag and Bruno Gollnisch respectively both announced their intentions not to stand. Two nationalist right-wing parties, the MPF and the DLC (led by Charles Millon), made agreements with Dominique Perben, who inserted their candidates on his list. Subsequently, former right-wing mayor Michel Noir openly distanced himself from Perben, most notably in a February interview with the Lyon daily Le Progrès. For the same reason, François Bayrou decided to maintain a separate MoDem list and not to support the Perben list.

Polls indicated that Collomb had approval nearing 90% and was favored to win an easy re-election.

== Results ==
=== 1st Arrondissement ===
Municipal election 2008: 1st Arrondissement
| Party | Candidate | Votes | % | ±% |
|---|---|---|---|---|
| PS | Nathalie Perrin-Gilbert | 5,919 | 58.69% | |
| UMP | Fabienne Levy | 1,868 | 18.52% | |
| LCR | Sophie Divry | 1,324 | 13.13% | |
| MoDem | Christophe Cédat | 629 | 6.24% | |
| FN | Anne Sigrist | 221 | 2.19% | |
| LO | Arlette Couzon | 124 | 1.23% | |
| Turnout | | 10,219 | | |
| PS gain from LV | | Swing | | |

=== 2nd Arrondissement ===
Municipal election 2008: 2nd Arrondissement
| Party | Candidate | Votes | % | ±% |
|---|---|---|---|---|
| UMP | Denis Broliquier | 4,655 | 45.82% | |
| PS | Nadine Gelas | 3,924 | 38.62% | |
| MoDem | Anne Pellet | 804 | 7.91% | |
| FN | Pascal Marion | 436 | 4.29% | |
| Far left | Frédéric Chambat | 341 | 3.36% | |
| Turnout | | 10,350 | | |
| UMP | Denis Broliquier | 5,537 | 58.19% | |
| PS | Nadine Gelas | 3,978 | 41.81% | |
| Turnout | | 9,676 | | |
| UMP hold | | Swing | | |

=== 3rd Arrondissement ===
Municipal election 2008: 3rd Arrondissement
| Party | Candidate | Votes | % | ±% |
|---|---|---|---|---|
| PS | Thiery Philip | 15,467 | 52.82% | |
| UMP | Dominique Perben | 8,790 | 30.02% | |
| MoDem | Eric Lafond | 2,147 | 7.33% | |
| LCR | Gilbert Dumas | 1,685 | 5.75% | |
| FN | Alain Niviere | 1,191 | 4.07% | |
| Turnout | | 29,727 | | |
| PS gain from UMP | | Swing | | |

== See also ==
- 2008 French municipal elections
- 2008 Paris municipal election
- 2008 Marseille municipal election
