= Bouches-du-Rhône's 11th constituency =

Constituency of the National Assembly of France

11th constituency of Bouches-du-Rhône
- inline Constituency of the National Assembly of France

- Constituency in Bouches-du-Rhône Department (white area is the Étang de Berre lagoon)

- Bouches-du-Rhône in France
- Deputy: Marc Pena; PS
- Department: Bouches-du-Rhône

The 11th constituency of Bouches-du-Rhône is a French legislative constituency in Bouches-du-Rhône.

== Deputies ==
Election	Member	Party
2002	Christian Kert	UMP
2007	Christian Kert	UMP
2012	Christian Kert	UMP
2017	Mohamed Laqhila	MoDem
2022	Mohamed Laqhila	MoDem
2024	Marc Pena	PS

== Elections ==
=== 2024 ===
Candidate	Party	Alliance	First round			Second round		
Candidate	Party	Alliance	Votes	%	+/–	Votes	%	+/–
Hervé Fabre-Aubrespy	RN		24,524	38.87	+15.64	29,299	49.77	+4.96
Marc Péna	PS	NFP	17,374	27.54	+5.07	29,570	50.23	new
Mohamed Laqhila	MoDEM	Ensemble	16,581	26.28	+0.85	withdrew		
Fayçal Zerguine	LR	UDC	2,562	4.06	-6.50			
Michel Bayle	DSV		837	1.33	new			
Jean-François Mebtouche	REC		835	1.32	-5.79			
Charlotte Maria	LO		382	0.61	-0.20			
Votes			63,095	100.00		58,869	100.00	
Valid votes			63,095	97.67	-0.67	58,869	92.19	+0.37
Blank votes			1,111	1.72	+0.45	4,084	6.40	+0.12
Null votes			392	0.61	+0.22	905	1.42	-0.47
Turnout			64,598	68.98	+23.06	63,858	68.18	+23.81
Abstentions			29,051	31.02	-23.06	29,799	31.82	-23.81
Registered voters			93,649			93,657		
Result			PS GAIN FROM MoDEM					

=== 2022 ===
Legislative Election 2022: Bouches-du-Rhône's 11th constituency
Party	Candidate	Votes	%	±%
MoDem (Ensemble)	Mohamed Laqhila	10,598	25.43	-9.78
RN	Hervé Fabre-Aubrespy	9,679	23.23	+5.22
G.s (NUPÉS)	Stéphane Salord	9,362	22.47	+2.19
UDI (UDC)	Hervé Liberman	4,399	10.56	−8.97
REC	Jérémie Piano	2,963	7.11	N/A
DVC	Elodie Virzi	1,134	2.72	N/A
DVE	Rodolphe Brun	978	2.35	N/A
Others	N/A	2,556		
Turnout		42,371	45.92	−0.93
2nd round result
MoDem (Ensemble)	Mohamed Laqhila	20,753	55.19	+4.24
RN	Hervé Fabre-Aubrespy	16,850	44.81	N/A
Turnout		37,603	44.37	+5.59
MoDem hold				

=== 2017 ===
Candidate	Label	First round		Second round	
Candidate	Label	Votes	%	Votes	%
Mohamed Laqhila	MoDem	14,495	35.21	15,804	50.95
Christian Kert	LR	8,041	19.53	15,214	49.05
Maximilien Fusone	FN	7,413	18.01		
Claudie Hubert	FI	4,489	10.90		
André Molino	PCF	2,449	5.95		
Dorian Hispa	ECO	1,410	3.43		
Éric Talles	ECO	1,051	2.55		
Gérald Ubaud	DLF	586	1.42		
Romain Hadjali	DIV	285	0.69		
Angélique Bontoux	DIV	278	0.68		
Edwige Mauchamp	DIV	253	0.61		
M'Tira Souad Hammal	DVG	206	0.50		
Émilie Maria	EXG	180	0.44		
Guilhem D'Urbal	DVD	29	0.07		
Votes		41,165	100.00	31,018	100.00
Valid votes		41,165	98.43	31,018	89.61
Blank votes		482	1.15	2,695	7.79
Null votes		176	0.42	901	2.60
Turnout		41,823	46.85	34,614	38.78
Abstentions		47,445	53.15	54,654	61.22
Registered voters		89,268		89,268	
Source: Ministry of the Interior

=== 2012 ===
Summary of the 10 June and 17 June 2012 French legislative election in Bouches-du-Rhône’s 11th Constituency
Candidate	Party		1st round		2nd round	
Candidate	Party		Votes	%	Votes	%
Christian Kert	Union for a Popular Movement	UMP	15,696	32.59%	23,531	50.98%
Gaëlle Lenfant	Socialist Party	PS	16,787	34.85%	22,630	49.02%
Jean-Marie Cojannot	Front National	FN	10,390	21.57%		
Patrick Magro	Left Front	FG	4,131	8.58%		
Jean-Claude Auvigne	Miscellaneous Right	DVD	576	1.20%		
Stéphanie Clerc	Far Left	EXG	237	0.49%		
Vincent Cullard	Other	AUT	191	0.40%		
Corinne Morel	Far Left	EXG	157	0.33%		
Geneviève Jullien-Ortega	Radical Party of the Left	PRG	1	0.00%		
Total			48,166	100%	46,161	100%
Registered voters			85,348		85,346	
Blank/Void ballots			553	1.14%	1,396	2.94%
Turnout			48,719	57.08%	47,557	55.72%
Abstentions			36,629	42.92%	37,789	44.28%
Result					UMP HOLD	

=== 2007 ===
Summary of the 10 June and 17 June 2007 French legislative election in Bouches-du-Rhône’s 11th Constituency
Candidate	Party		1st round		2nd round	
Candidate	Party		Votes	%	Votes	%
Christian Kert	Union for a Popular Movement	UMP	28,911	49.97%	33,751	61.41%
Gaëlle Lenfant	Socialist Party	PS	12,428	21.48%	21,211	38.59%
Catherine Casanova	Democratic Movement	MoDem	5,084	8.79%		
Sabine Diaz	Front National	FN	3,047	5.27%		
Nathalie Leconte	Communist	PCF	1,733	3.00%		
Philippe Adam	Movement for France	MPF	1,448	2.50%		
Marie-Line Codol	Far Left	EXG	1,158	2.00%		
Pauline Ricci	Ecologist	ECO	918	1.59%		
Pierre Pieve	Ecologist	ECO	714	1.23%		
Pascale Tourrenc	Regionalist	REG	581	1.00%		
Florence Morini	Hunting, Fishing, Nature, Traditions	CPNT	579	1.00%		
Geneviève Jullien Ortega	Independent	DIV	459	0.79%		
Sébastien Grenard	Far Right	EXD	376	0.65%		
Brigitte Espaze	Far Left	EXG	286	0.65%		
Djamel Delhoum	Independent	DIV	138	0.24%		
Nathalie Lagneau	Miscellaneous Right	DVD	0	0.00%		
Total			57,860	100%	54,962	100%
Registered voters			100,136		100,137	
Blank/Void ballots			910	1.55%	1,815	3.20%
Turnout			58,770	58.69%	56,777	56.70%
Abstentions			41,366	41.31%	43,360	43.30%
Result					UMP HOLD	

=== 2002 ===
Legislative Election 2002: Bouches-du-Rhône's 11th constituency
Party	Candidate	Votes	%	±%
UMP	Christian Kert	20,123	35.56	
DVG	Serge Andreoni	14,508	25.64	
FN	Marie-Paule Lanfranchi	6,647	11.75	
MNR	Philippe Adam	4,507	7.97	
PCF	Nathalie Leconte	1,612	2.85	
DVD	Jeanne Cense	1,574	2.78	
DVD	Herve Liberman	1,302	2.30	
DVD	Jean-Michel Segantini	1,196	2.11	
Others	N/A	5,116		
Turnout		57,698	65.30	
2nd round result
UMP	Christian Kert	29,541	59.32	
DVG	Serge Andreoni	20,258	40.68	
Turnout		52,654	59.60	
UMP gain from UDF				

=== 1997 ===
Legislative Election 1997: Bouches-du-Rhône's 11th constituency
Party	Candidate	Votes	%	±%
UDF	Christian Kert	14,990	29.00	
FN	Philippe Adam	12,951	25.06	
PRG	Yves Vidal	12,589	24.36	
PCF	Danielle Bellan	4,413	8.54	
LV	Annick Delhaye	2,144	4.15	
DVD	Pierre Chazerans	1,566	3.03	
GE	Pierre Pieve	1,312	2.54	
Others	N/A	1,724		
Turnout		53,851	67.31	
2nd round result
UDF	Christian Kert	24,253	42.00	
PRG	Yves Vidal	22,130	38.32	
FN	Philippe Adam	11,362	19.68	
Turnout		59,414	74.26	
UDF hold				
