= Henri Jibrayel =

French politician (born 1951)

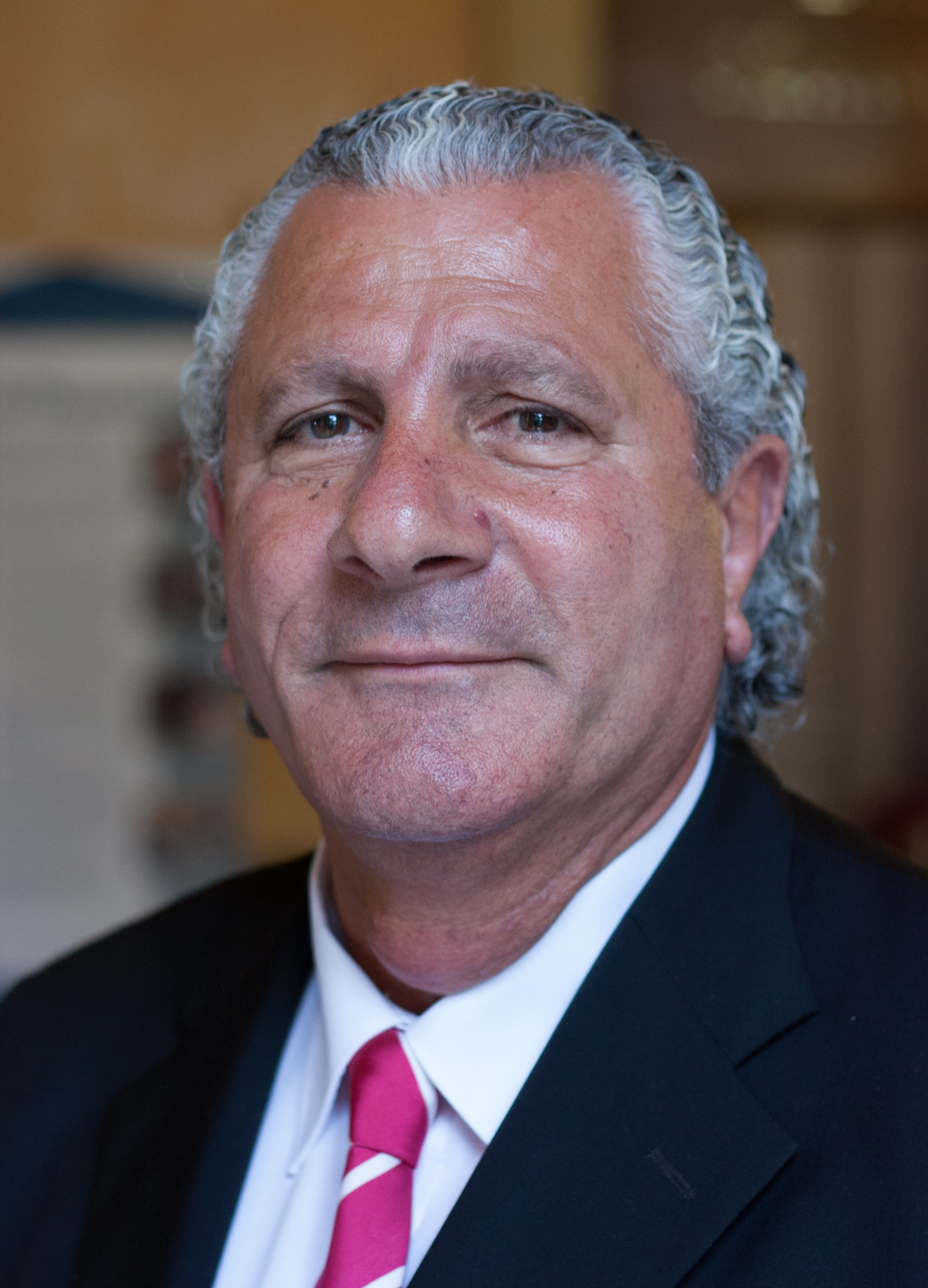
- Henri Jibrayel in 2012
- Parliamentary group: PS

Deputy for Bouches-du-Rhône's 7th constituency in the National Assembly of France
- In office 20 June 2012 – 20 June 2017
- Preceded by: Sylvie Andrieux
- Succeeded by: Saïd Ahamada

Personal details
- Born: 18 September 1951 (age 74) Marseille, France

Henri Jibrayel (Arabic: هنرى چيبرايل; born on 18 September 1951 in Marseille) is a French politician with Lebanese and Assyrian roots.

His father was an Assyrian survivor of the Assyrian genocide, that took place in present-day Turkey, who had taken refuge with his parents in a Beirut slum. He married in 1938 a Lebanese Maronite young woman from Bkassine (near Jezzine), then joined the Free French Forces after De Gaulle's Appeal of 18 June. After the war, the family got the French naturalisation and was hosted by its new fatherland in a slum near Marseille. The father was sent in Madagascar till 1950 to repress the anticolonial insurgency, then again in Indochina in one of France's colonial wars. In 1963, the family, including 8 children, tries a comeback in Lebanon, and settle in Ain al-Remmane, but this attempt led to a fiasco, and two years later the family turned back to Marseille, Henri left school at 15, became a crane driver, and afterwards entered the French Poste.

After being a trade-unionist at the Poste, he became conseiller général for the Socialist Party in a Marseille canton and maire-adjoint in a Marseille secteur in 2001, then he was elected member of the National Assembly of France on 17 June 2007 with 57.41% of votes (25.85% at the first round), so becoming one out of three metropolitan deputies with non-European family roots.

He was defeated in the 2017 election by Saïd Ahamada of La République En Marche!.

On 19 December 2014 he was accused of breach of trust and illegal acquisitions of interest regarding the payment of four small cruises he organised for retired people of Marseille, right after and right before elections. In August 2018, he was committed for trial for misappropriation of public funds and illegal acquisitions of interest. In September 2020, he was sentenced to thirty months of imprisonment, five years of deprivation of civic and civil rights (including ineligibility) and a fine of 30000 €.
