= 2008 French municipal elections =

The French municipal elections of 2008 were held on 9 and 16 March to elect the municipal councils of France's 36,782 communes. The first task of each newly constituted municipal council was to elect a mayor.

Municipal councilors, and the mayors they elect, ordinarily serve a term of six years. However, those who took office following the last municipal elections, held on 11 and 18 March 2001, had their terms extended to seven years by an Act of the French parliament, designed to avoid an overloading of the electoral calendar in 2007.

== Results ==
The left gained back grounds lost in 2001 and in previous elections, and sent a message of warning to President Nicolas Sarkozy, in power since 2007. The PS gained cities like Toulouse, Strasbourg, Amiens, Saint-Étienne and Reims. The left also held on easily to most of its cities, including Paris and Lyon. The close election in Marseille, however, was won by the UMP incumbent. The right did poorly but held on to some of its cities like Bordeaux, Le Havre, Nice, Toulon or Aix-en-Provence. Among right-wing gains were the cities of Chaumont, Le-Puy-en-Velay, and Calais (ending 37 years of Communist control).

François Bayrou's centrist MoDem did poorly, although MoDem incumbents generally won. However, Bayrou himself was defeated (by the PS) in his hometown of Pau. Between the two rounds the MoDem followed three strategies: maintain its list in the runoffs, if qualified; ally with the right (as in Toulouse); or ally with the left (as in Marseille).

The far-right FN did extremely poorly, winning only 0.93% nationwide and qualifying for the runoff in only 7 cities with 30,000+ population (40 in 2001, 105 in 1995).

The Greens regained grounds lost in 2007, the most notable Green gain was by Dominique Voynet in Montreuil. However, the Green vote was halved in Paris over 2001.

The PCF held most of its ground in its Seine-Saint-Denis strongholds (despite most incumbents facing Socialist candidates) but also in other PCF cities (Nanterre, Arles). It gained Dieppe and Vierzon while losing Calais (to UMP) and Aubervilliers (to PS).

== Important races ==
=== Paris ===
The popular Socialist incumbent Bertrand Delanoë was very easily re-elected. Françoise de Panafieu represented the centre-right UMP as the right tried, in vain, to regain the capital. Among high-profile candidates on her lists is the Justice Minister Rachida Dati, UMP elected in the 7th arrondissement of Paris.

=== Bordeaux ===
In Bordeaux, the incumbent mayor and former prime minister Alain Juppé, defeated in the 2007 parliamentary election, stood for re-election. The Socialist candidate was Aquitaine President Alain Rousset. The centrist MoDem, led by François Bayrou, announced its support for Juppé. Juppé was re-elected by the first round with over 56% of votes cast, even improving over 2001.

Municipal election 2008: Bordeaux
Party	Candidate	Votes	%	±%
UMP	Alain Juppé*	46,087	56.62	
PS	Alain Rousset	27,790	34.14	
LCR	Emmanuel Bichindaritz	2,484	3.05	
FN	Jacques Colombier	2,111	2.59	
DIV	Marc Vanhove	1,201	1.48	
NM	Adrien Bonnet	1,144	1.41	+1.41
LO	Denis Lacoste	502	0.62	
DVG	Mohamed Akrout	77	0.09	
Turnout		82,354	61.70	
UMP hold		Swing		

=== Lyon ===
In 2001, the Socialist Gérard Collomb won the country's second largest city from the UDF. Lyon had been considered a stronghold for the centrist UDF in previous years. In 2008, former UMP Transportation Minister Dominique Perben tried to win back the city. Surprisingly, the two highly presumed candidates for the centrist MoDem and the far-right National Front, Azouz Begag and Bruno Gollnisch respectively both announced their intentions not to stand.

In February, after a fight with MoDem leader François Bayrou, the MoDem list leader integrated the UMP list, but Bayrou found another list leader. The MoDem list was also shaken after one of its list was rejected because one of its candidates was also on a FN list.

With his sky-high popularity, Collomb was re-elected by the first round and Perben himself was defeated in his sector.

=== Marseille ===
In the country's third largest city, Jean-Claude Gaudin of the UMP faced Socialist Senator Jean-Noël Guérini, FN candidate Stéphane Ravier, and MoDem MEP Jean-Luc Bennahmias. The race was very close and both sides had a chance to win, but Gaudin was re-elected narrowly.

=== Nice ===
The right was divided in this generally right-wing city, with incumbent Mayor Jacques Peyrat staging a dissident candidacy against UMP candidate Christian Estrosi. Estrosi won 38% to Peyrat's 23%. However, the PS candidate Patrick Allemand, with his 22%, also qualified for a three-way runoff.

Municipal election 2008: Nice
Party	Candidate	Votes	%	±%
UMP	Christian Estrosi	46,576	38.27	
UMP	Jacques Peyrat	28,161	23.14	
PS	Patrick Allemand	27,141	22.30	
PRG	Patrick Mottard	7,887	6.48	
FN	Lydia Schenardi	5,068	4.16	
MoDem	Hervé Caël	3,781	3.11	
Far right	Philippe Vardon	3,686	3.03	
LCR	Bruno Della Sudda	2,413	1.98	
Turnout		124,767	58.16	
UMP	Christian Estrosi	51,792	41.33	
PS	Patrick Allemand	41,561	33.17	
UMP	Jacques Peyrat*	31,952	25.50	
Turnout		125,305	60	
UMP gain from UMP		Swing		

=== Rennes ===
In this Socialist city, longtime Mayor Edmond Hervé (since 1977) did not lead the PS list in this election, he was replaced by Saint-Jacques-de-la-Lande mayor Daniel Delaveau, who was easily elected. The MoDem candidate, with her 10%, also won a place in the runoff.

Municipal election 2008: Rennes
Party	Candidate	Votes	%	±%
PS	Daniel Delaveau	30,735	46.98	
UMP	Karim Boudjema	17,084	26.11	
MoDem	Caroline Ollivro	6,692	10.23	
LV	Nicole Kiil-Nielsen	5,841	8.93	
Far left	Valerie Faucheux	3,263	4.99	
LO	Raymond Madec	1,151	1.76	
Workers' Party	Carine Weber	661	1.01	
Turnout		67,134	56.93	+3.97
PS	Daniel Delaveau	37,169	60.40	
UMP	Karim Boudjema	16,885	27.44	
MoDem	Caroline Ollivro	7,480	12.16	
Turnout		61,534	53.	
PS hold		Swing		

=== Toulouse ===
Jean-Luc Moudenc of the UMP faced a very tough race against the left, which swept the city in the Presidential and Legislative elections held in 2007. Contrary to polls, Moudenc came out on top of the first round with 42% to the PS's 39%. Following the first round, he merged his lists with the MoDem. However, he lost to Pierre Cohen, the PS candidate.

Municipal election 2008: Toulouse
Party	Candidate	Votes	%	±%
UMP	Jean-Luc Moudenc*	57,303	42.60	
PS	Pierre Cohen	52,455	39.00	
MoDem	Jean-Luc Forget	7,936	5.90	
DVG	François Simon	7,293	5.42	
LCR	Myriam Martin	6,817	5.07	
MoDem	André Gallego	1,155	0.86	
LO	Sandra Torremocha	1,112	0.83	
Far left	Thierry Dupin	446	0.33	
Turnout		137,283	46.50	
PS	Pierre Cohen	73,414	50.42	
UMP	Jean-Luc Moudenc*	72,205	49.58	
Turnout		145,619	61	
PS gain from UMP		Swing		

=== Lille ===
Socialist incumbent Martine Aubry ran for re-election, with 6 candidates opposing her. The Greens, although they qualified for the runoff, preferred to merge with Aubry's PS lists, as did the MoDem, which chose to merge with the Left list in Lille, and for the Right one in other cities.

Municipal election 2008: Lille
Party	Candidate	Votes	%	±%
PS	Martine Aubry*	27,202	46.02	
UMP	Sébastien Huyghe	12,791	21.64	
LV	Eric Quiquet	6,848	11.58	
MoDem	Jacques Richir	4,603	7.79	
FN	Éric Dillies	3,317	5.61	
LCR	Jan Pauwels	2,337	3.95	
LO	Nicole Baudrin	1,373	2.32	
DVG	Etienne Forest	642	1.09	
Turnout		60,599	48.83	
PS	Martine Aubry*	35,226	66.56	
UMP	Sébastien Huyghe	17,700	33.44	
Turnout		52,926	44	
PS hold		Swing		

=== Strasbourg ===
The capital of Alsace, Strasbourg was gained by the right from the left in 2001. However, in 2008, the UMP incumbent Fabienne Keller could be potentially defeated by the PS's Roland Ries. A poll showed her defeated 53–47 in the runoff.

Municipal election 2008: Strasbourg
Party	Candidate	Votes	%	±%
PS	Roland Ries	32,753	43.90	
UMP	Fabienne Keller*	25,314	33.93	
LV	Alain Jund	4,752	6.37	
MoDem	Chantal Cutajar	4,280	5.74	
FN	Christian Cotelle	2,121	2.84	
Alsace d'Abord	Robert Spieler	1,616	2.17	
LCR	Marcel Wolff	1,394	1.87	
DIV	Mohammed Latreche	1,047	1.40	
DVG	Jamal Boussif	540	0.72	
LO	Roland Robert	504	0.68	
Far left	Pascal Fischer	290	0.39	
Turnout		75,893	54.68	
PS	Roland Ries	44,935	58.33	
UMP	Fabienne Keller*	32,097	41.66	
Turnout				
PS gain from UMP		Swing		

== Ethnic pluralism ==
For the first time ever, the three main parties (center-right UMP, centrist MoDem, and center-left PS) put on top of a 50-odd lists candidates with a non-European ethnic background ("candidats de la diversité"), most either from North Africa, a few from the French Caribbean departments or sub-Saharan Africa, most against incumbent mayors from the opposite party, thus with lower chances to succeed.

Candidates' posters for the French municipal elections in 2008

There were only seven incumbent mayors in Metropolitan France with non-European roots, all in rural communes with less than 5,000 inhabitants where the percentage of foreign stock population is close to nil:

- Auguste Senghor (nephew of Léopold Sedar Senghor), mayor of Le May-sur-Èvre (Maine-et-Loire, 3,891 inhabitants) in 1977–1989 and 1995–2008, was elected mayor of Saint-Briac (Ille-et-Vilaine, 2,054 inhabitants) where incumbent Mayor Brice Lalonde was no longer a candidate
- Xavier Cadoret, born in Morocco as Karim Kadouri, PS mayor of Saint-Gérand-le-Puy (Allier, 1,029 inhabitants) since the death of the previous mayor in 1991, reelected in 1995 and 2001
- Éric Besson, born in Morocco from a Lebanese mother, since 1995 mayor (formerly PS) of Donzère (Drôme, 4,700 inhabitants)
- Mahfoud Aomar (Algerian parents), nonpartisan mayor of Guerchy (Yonne, 601 inhabitants) since 2001
- Kaddour Derrar, divers gauche mayor of Condette (Pas-de-Calais, 2,675 inhabitants) since 2001, when the former mayor endorsed him as his successor
- Pierre Pluton (Afro-Caribbean), UMP mayor of Évry-Grégy-sur-Yerre (Seine-et-Marne, 2,060 inhabitants) since 2001
- Jean-Claude Gautry (Afro-Caribbean), mayor of Paroy (Seine-et-Marne, 198 inhabitants) since 2001

The six who were again candidates in their commune were reelected in the first round with results varying from 60% to 88% of the votes, and Auguste Senghor, candidate in another commune far away from the previous one, was the only candidate elected there in the first round with 52% of the votes.

Two more small municipal councils elected mayors with non-European roots: Volvic (Puy-de-Dôme, 4,202 inhabitants) elected the Harki activist Mohand Hamoumou (miscellaneous right) and Morey (Saône-et-Loire, 184 inhabitants), Kader Atteye, whose parents came from Djibouti, but 5 councillors out of 11 resigned in protest over the election of a black mayor

Only one candidat de la diversité heading a list in a town of more than 10,000 inhabitants was elected in the first round: Eddie Aït, already a regional councillor and departmental leader for the Left Radical Party (centre-left) beat the incumbent UMP mayor of Carrières-sous-Poissy (Yvelines, 13,472 inhabitants) with 62.4% of the votes and was elected as mayor. Another was elected mayor after the second round, Philippe N'Guyen Tahnn (PS) in Vernon (Eure, 23,700 inhabitants)

The left-wing list headed by Samia Ghali (PS vice-president of the Provence-Alpes-Côte d'Azur regional council) won in the first round in the VIIIth secteur (borough) of Marseille (92,100 inhabitants) with 52.30%. Had the left won in Marseille, she had been promised the first adjunct-mayorship, finally she was elected mayor of this secteur, succeeding the incumbent Communist mayor.

The UMP list headed by Justice minister Rachida Dati got 49.50% in the first round in the 7th arrondissement of Paris (55,700 inhabitants). She was elected maire d'arrondissement after the second round.

== Results ==
City	Population (1999)	Incumbent	Elected 2008
Paris	2 125 246	Bertrand Delanoë	
Marseille	798 430	Jean-Claude Gaudin	
Lyon	445 452	Gérard Collomb	
Toulouse	390 350	Jean-Luc Moudenc	Pierre Cohen
Nice	342 738	Jacques Peyrat	Christian Estrosi
Nantes	270 251	Jean-Marc Ayrault	
Strasbourg	264 115	Fabienne Keller	Roland Ries
Montpellier	225 392	Hélène Mandroux-Colas	
Bordeaux	215 363	Alain Juppé	
Lille	212 597	Martine Aubry	
Rennes	206 229	Edmond Hervé	Daniel Delaveau
Le Havre	190 905	Antoine Rufenacht	
Reims	187 206	Jean-Louis Schneiter	Adeline Hazan
Saint-Étienne	180 210	Michel Thiollière	Maurice Vincent
Toulon	160 639	Hubert Falco	
Grenoble	153 317	Michel Destot	
Angers	151 279	Jean-Claude Antonini	
Brest	149 634	François Cuillandre	
Le Mans	146 105	Jean-Claude Boulard	
Clermont-Ferrand	137 140	Serge Godard	
Amiens	135 510	Gilles de Robien	Gilles Demailly
Aix-en-Provence	134 222	Maryse Joissains-Masini	
Limoges	137 140	Alain Rodet	
Nîmes	133 424	Jean-Paul Fournier	
Tours	132 820	Jean Germain	

== See also ==
- 2008 Lyon municipal election
- 2008 Marseille municipal election
- 2008 Paris municipal election
