= Amine Kessaci =

French activist (born 2003)

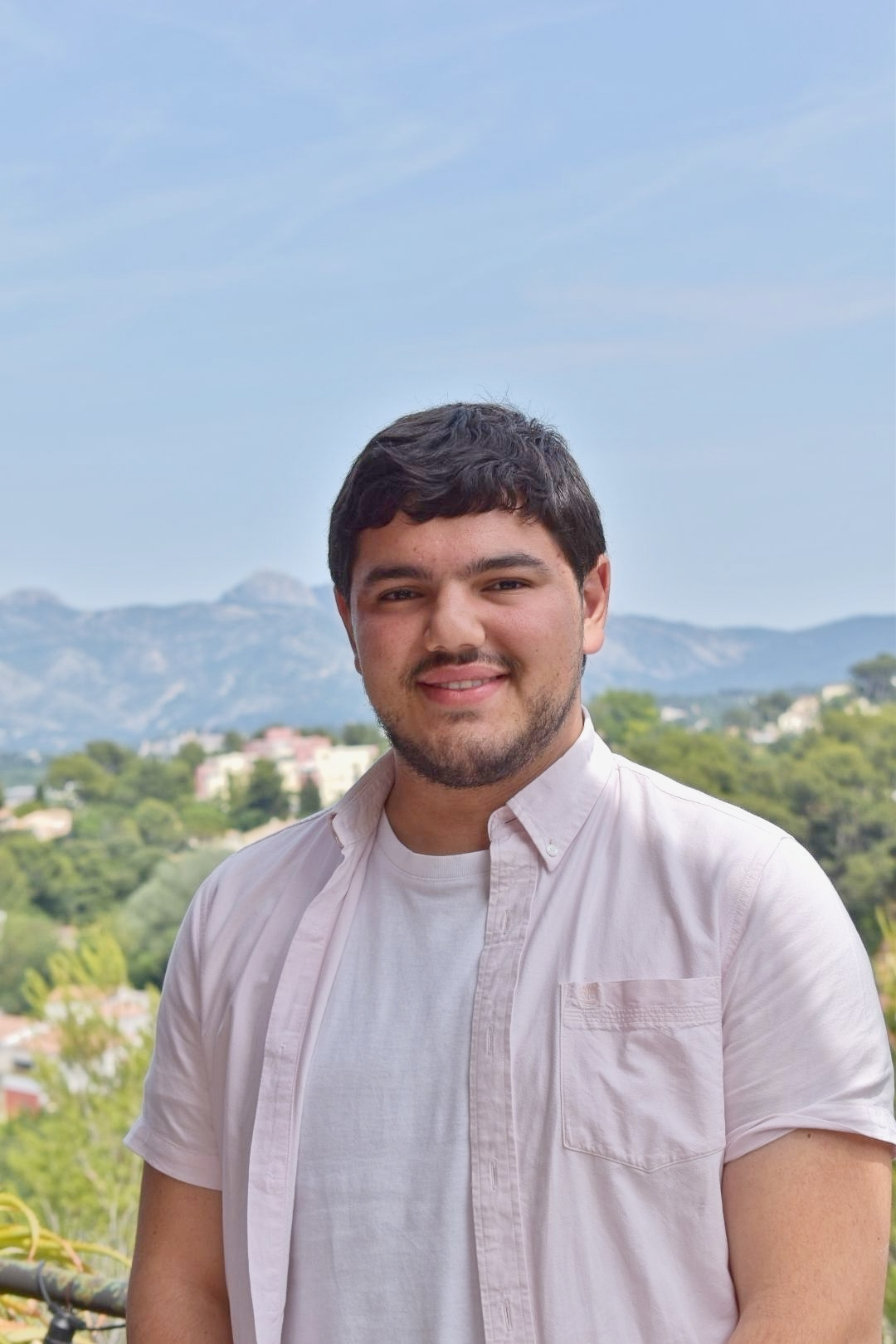
- Born: 2003 (age 22–23); Marseille, France
- Occupations: Activist, author, politician
- Known for: Anti-drug activism in Marseille; Candidate in 2024 French legislative election
- Notable work: Marseille, essuie tes larmes. Vivre et mourir en terre de narcotrafic (2025)

Amine Kessaci is a French politician and community activist involved in the fight against drug trafficking.

== Biography ==
=== Early life and education ===
Kessaci was born in Marseille in 2003. He grew up in the Frais-Vallon district.

=== Activism ===
In 2020, Kessaci's brother Brahim, then 22-years-old, was murdered by drug gangs. Following the murder, Kessaci began activism against drug gangs and for improving the socio-economic conditions in impoverished French neighbourhoods. He soon became a prominent anti-drugs activist in Marseille.

In October 2025, Kessaci published the book Marseille, essuie tes larmes. Vivre et mourir en terre de narcotrafic.

=== Political activity ===
In June 2024, Kessaci ran as a candidate in the 2024 French legislative election for The Ecologists (part of the New Popular Front alliance) in Bouches-du-Rhône. He finished in second place in the first round of voting with 35.68% of the vote, and finished with 49.07% in the second round, narrowly losing to the National Rally's Gisèle Lelouis.

=== Murder of Mehdi Kessaci ===
In November 2025, Kessaci's 20-year-old brother Mehdi was murdered by drug gangs in central Marseille. The murder was widely believed to be an attempt by the drug gangs to intimidate Kessaci and retaliate against his activism. Following the murder, Kessaci pledged that "I won't be quiet. I will speak of the violence of drug trafficking. Its grip. I will speak of the cowardice of those who order the crimes. I will speak of the shortcomings of the state, the flaws of the republic, the abandoned territories, and the obliterated populations."
