= Bouches-du-Rhône's 14th constituency =

Constituency of the National Assembly of France

14th constituency of Bouches-du-Rhône
- inline Constituency of the National Assembly of France

- Constituency in Bouches-du-Rhône Department (white area is the Étang de Berre lagoon)

- Bouches-du-Rhône in France
- Deputy: Gérault Verny; LR (UXD)
- Department: Bouches-du-Rhône

The 14th constituency of Bouches-du-Rhône is a French legislative constituency in Bouches-du-Rhône.

== Deputies ==
Election	Member	Party
1997	Jean-Bernard Raimond	RPR
2002	Maryse Joissains Masini	UMP
2007	Maryse Joissains Masini	UMP
2012	Jean-David Ciot	PS
2017	Anne-Laurence Petel	LREM
2022	Anne-Laurence Petel	RE
2024	Gérault Verny	LR (UXD)

== Elections ==
=== 2024 ===
Candidate	Party	Alliance	First round			Second round		
Candidate	Party	Alliance	Votes	%	+/–	Votes	%	+/–
Gérault Verny	LR-RN	UXD	21,734	31.65	new	25,880	37.26	new
Jean-David Ciot	PS	NFP	20,242	29.48	+3.68	25,022	36.03	-7.12
Anne-Laurence Petel	RE	Ensemble	19,853	28.91	-1.08	18,553	26.71	-30.14
Gaëtan Muselet	LR	UDC	3,869	5.63	-6.45			
Dominique Sassoon	ECO		1,010	1.47	new			
Charles Moyal	REC		827	1.20	-5.06			
Mireille Dufay	DLF		635	0.92	-0.83			
Anne Roche	LO		470	0.68	+0.08			
Baptiste Bouckenhove	DVD		30	0.04	new			
Votes			68,670	100.00		69,455	100.00	
Valid votes			68,670	97.78	-0.60	69,455	97.88	+6.20
Blank votes			1,118	1.59	+0.47	1,116	1.57	-4.25
Null votes			439	0.63	+0.13	389	0.55	-1.95
Turnout			70,227	70.24	+21.60	70,960	70.96	+24.12
Abstentions			29,759	29.76	-21.60	29,035	29.04	-24.12
Registered voters			99,986			99,995		
Result			UXD GAIN FROM RE					

=== 2022 ===
Legislative Election 2022: Bouches-du-Rhône's 14th constituency
Party	Candidate	Votes	%	±%
LREM (Ensemble)	Anne-Laurence Petel	14,250	29.99	-7.19
LFI (NUPÉS)	Hélène Le Cacheux	12,256	25.80	+2.07
RN	Emeline Coch	7,961	16.76	+3.80
LR (UDC)	Michel Boulan	5,741	12.08	−4.73
REC	Catie Calbet	2,975	6.26	N/A
DVE	Alain Kavazian	1,192	2.51	N/A
DVE	Charlotte De Busschere	1,015	2.14	N/A
Others	N/A	2,119		
Turnout		48,293	48.64	−1.12
2nd round result
LREM (Ensemble)	Anne-Laurence Petel	24,245	56.85	-3.38
LFI (NUPÉS)	Hélène Le Cacheux	18,404	43.15	N/A
Turnout		42,649	46.84	+5.23
LREM hold				

=== 2017 ===
Candidate	Label	First round		Second round	
Candidate	Label	Votes	%	Votes	%
Anne-Laurence Petel	REM	17,552	37.18	21,500	60.23
Stéphane Paoli	LR	7,937	16.81	14,197	39.77
Nathalie Chevillard	FN	6,119	12.96		
Hélène Le Cacheux	FI	6,024	12.76		
Jean-David Ciot	PS	4,096	8.68		
Josiane Durrieu	PCF	1,081	2.29		
Josefa Maunier	DVD	781	1.65		
Laure Papounaud	PRG	597	1.26		
Pierre Cayol	DLF	558	1.18		
Éric Étienne	DIV	444	0.94		
Martial Couturier	DIV	408	0.86		
Philippe Renault-Guillemet	DVD	357	0.76		
Hamza Belkolli	ECO	335	0.71		
Josyane Solari	EXD	308	0.65		
Bertrand Le Besque	DIV	247	0.52		
Anne Roche	EXG	226	0.48		
Olivia Franzi-Labiad	ECO	59	0.12		
Jean-Charles Poupel	DIV	43	0.09		
Lucas Dureuil	DIV	36	0.08		
Votes		47,208	100.00	35,697	100.00
Valid votes		47,208	98.29	35,697	88.98
Blank votes		591	1.23	3,187	7.94
Null votes		232	0.48	1,235	3.08
Turnout		48,031	49.76	40,119	41.61
Abstentions		48,498	50.24	56,301	58.39
Registered voters		96,529		96,420	
Source: Ministry of the Interior

=== 2012 ===
Summary of the 10 June and 17 June 2012 French legislative election in Bouches-du-Rhône’s 14th Constituency
Candidate	Party		1st round		2nd round	
Candidate	Party		Votes	%	Votes	%
Jean-David Ciot	Socialist Party	PS	19,554	35.60%	28,941	53.55%
Maryse Joissains-Masini	Union for a Popular Movement	UMP	15,675	28.54%	25,107	46.45%
Josyane Solari	Front National	FN	7,770	14.15%		
Michel Boulan	Miscellaneous Right	DVD	4,577	8.33%		
Josiane Durrieu	Left Front	FG	3,273	5.96%		
Geneviève Hamy	Europe Ecology – The Greens	EELV	2,224	4.05%		
Joséfa Maunier	Ecologist	ECO	480	0.87%		
Philippe Neveu	Miscellaneous Right	DVD	418	0.76%		
Pierre Cayol	Miscellaneous Right	DVD	388	0.71%		
Bertrand Robert	Other	AUT	229	0.42%		
François Lefebvre	Far Left	EXG	190	0.35%		
Charlotte Maria	Far Left	EXG	146	0.27%		
Malik Houamria	Ecologist	ECO	0	0.00%		
Total			54,924	100%	54,048	100%
Registered voters			93,933		93,933	
Blank/Void ballots			618	1.11%	1,697	3.04%
Turnout			55,542	59.13%	55,745	59.35%
Abstentions			38,391	40.87%	38,188	40.65%
Result					PS GAIN FROM UMP	

=== 2007 ===
Summary of the 10 June and 17 June 2007 French legislative election in Bouches-du-Rhône’s 14th Constituency
Candidate	Party		1st round		2nd round	
Candidate	Party		Votes	%	Votes	%
Maryse Joissains Masini	Union for a Popular Movement	UMP	26,872	44.63%	31,417	54.86%
Alexandre Medvedowsky	Socialist Party	PS	16,162	26.84%	25,853	45.14%
Brigitte Devesa	Democratic Movement	MoDem	5,768	9.58%		
Honoré Beyer	Front National	FN	2,363	3.92%		
Josiane Durrieu	Communist	PCF	1,647	2.74%		
Laurent Perallat	The Greens	VEC	1,501	2.49%		
Cédric Bottero	Far Left	EXG	1,186	1.97%		
Jean-Pierre Borne	Independent	DIV	842	1.40%		
Valérie Poussel	Movement for France	MPF	840	1.40%		
Monique Ferrie	Ecologist	ECO	630	1.05%		
Catherine Villa	Ecologist	ECO	562	0.93%		
Virginie Devallet	Hunting, Fishing, Nature, Traditions	CPNT	434	0.72%		
Yves Martinez	Independent	DIV	377	0.63%		
Vincent Autric	Far Right	EXD	356	0.59%		
Sonia Pennavayre	Miscellaneous Right	DVD	347	0.58%		
Noëlle Lagrange	Far Left	EXG	230	0.38%		
Francis Figarols	Miscellaneous Right	DVD	92	0.15%		
Total			60,209	100%	57,270	100%
Registered voters			101,909		101,906	
Blank/Void ballots			843	1.38%	2,266	3.81%
Turnout			61,052	59.91%	59,536	58.42%
Abstentions			40,857	40.09%	42,370	41.58%
Result					UMP HOLD	

=== 2002 ===
Legislative Election 2002: Bouches-du-Rhône's 14th constituency
Party	Candidate	Votes	%	±%
UMP	Maryse Joissains Masini	20,882	35.09	
PRG	Danielle Rumani Elbez	14,542	24.44	
FN	Gerard Beyer	7,629	12.82	
UDF	Jean-Bernard Raimond	5,496	9.24	
LV	Marie-Nicole Payet	1,723	2.90	
PCF	Jean-Louis Brunel	1,687	2.83	
MNR	Vincent Autric	1,195	2.01	
Others	N/A	6,101		
Turnout		60,571	66.54	
2nd round result
UMP	Maryse Joissains Masini	30,701	58.10	
PRG	Danielle Rumani Elbez	22,145	41.90	
Turnout		55,534	61.01	
UMP hold				

=== 1997 ===
Legislative Election 1997: Bouches-du-Rhône's 14th constituency
Party	Candidate	Votes	%	±%
PS	Alexandre Medvedowsky	14,409	26.72	
RPR	Jean-Bernard Raimond	10,349	19.19	
FN	Vincent Autric	9,960	18.47	
DVD	Jean-Pierre Bouvet	7,948	14.74	
PCF	Evelyne Thobert	4,100	7.60	
LV	Loic Giraudon	1,780	3.30	
Others	N/A	5,386		
Turnout		56,142	66.64	
2nd round result
RPR	Jean-Bernard Raimond	29,031	51.70	
PS	Alexandre Medvedowsky	27,119	48.30	
Turnout		59,928	71.14	
RPR hold				
