= Alexandra Louis =

French lawyer and politician (born 1983)

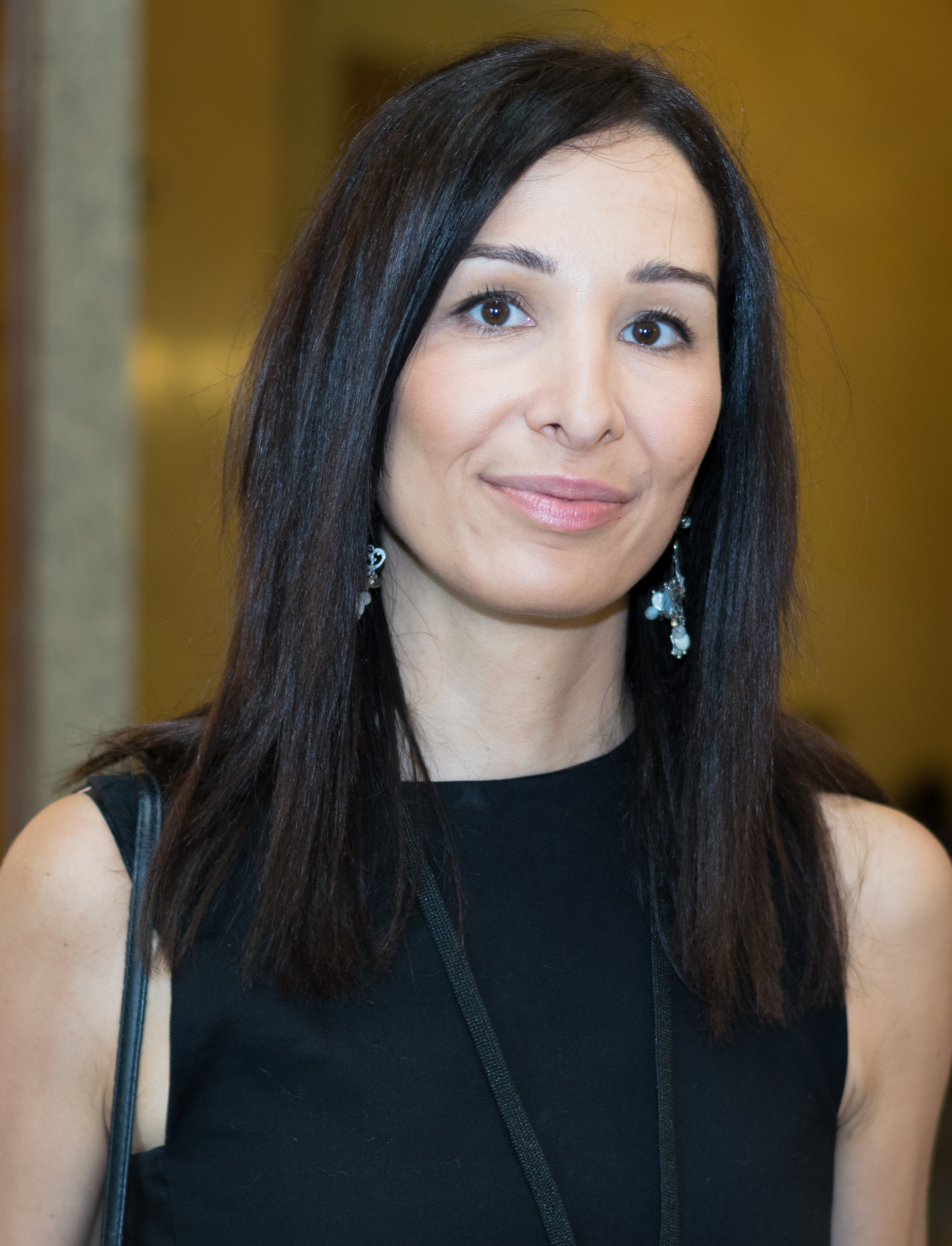

Member of the National Assembly for Bouches-du-Rhône's 3rd constituency
- In office 21 June 2017 – 21 June 2022
- Preceded by: Sylvie Andrieux
- Succeeded by: Gisèle Lelouis

Personal details
- Born: 17 September 1983 (age 42) Grenoble, France
- Party: La République En Marche!
- Profession: Lawyer, politician

Alexandra Louis (French pronunciation: [alɛksɑ̃dʁa lwi]; born 17 September 1983) is a French lawyer and politician of La République En Marche! (LREM) who represented the 3rd constituency of the Bouches-du-Rhône department in the National Assembly from 2017 to 2022.

== Political career ==
In parliament, Louis served as member of the Committee on Legal Affairs. In that capacity, she drafted 2021 legislation that would effectively criminalize incest and strengthen the criminalization of sexual relationships between an adult and a minor under the age of 15. In addition to her committee assignments, she was part of the parliamentary friendship groups with Madagascar and the Comoros.

In addition to her parliamentary work, Louis was a member of the French delegation to the Parliamentary Assembly of the Council of Europe from 2017 to 2022. In this capacity, she served on the Committee on Legal Affairs and Human Rights; the Committee on the Honouring of Obligations and Commitments by Member States of the Council of Europe (Monitoring Committee); and the Sub-Committee on Human Rights. She was also the Assembly's rapporteur on the situation of human rights defenders in the region.

In the 2022 French legislative election Louis lost her seat after being eliminated in the first round.

== Political positions ==
In July 2019, Louis voted in favour of the French ratification of the European Union's Comprehensive Economic and Trade Agreement (CETA) with Canada.
