= Gérault Verny =

French politician (born 1984)

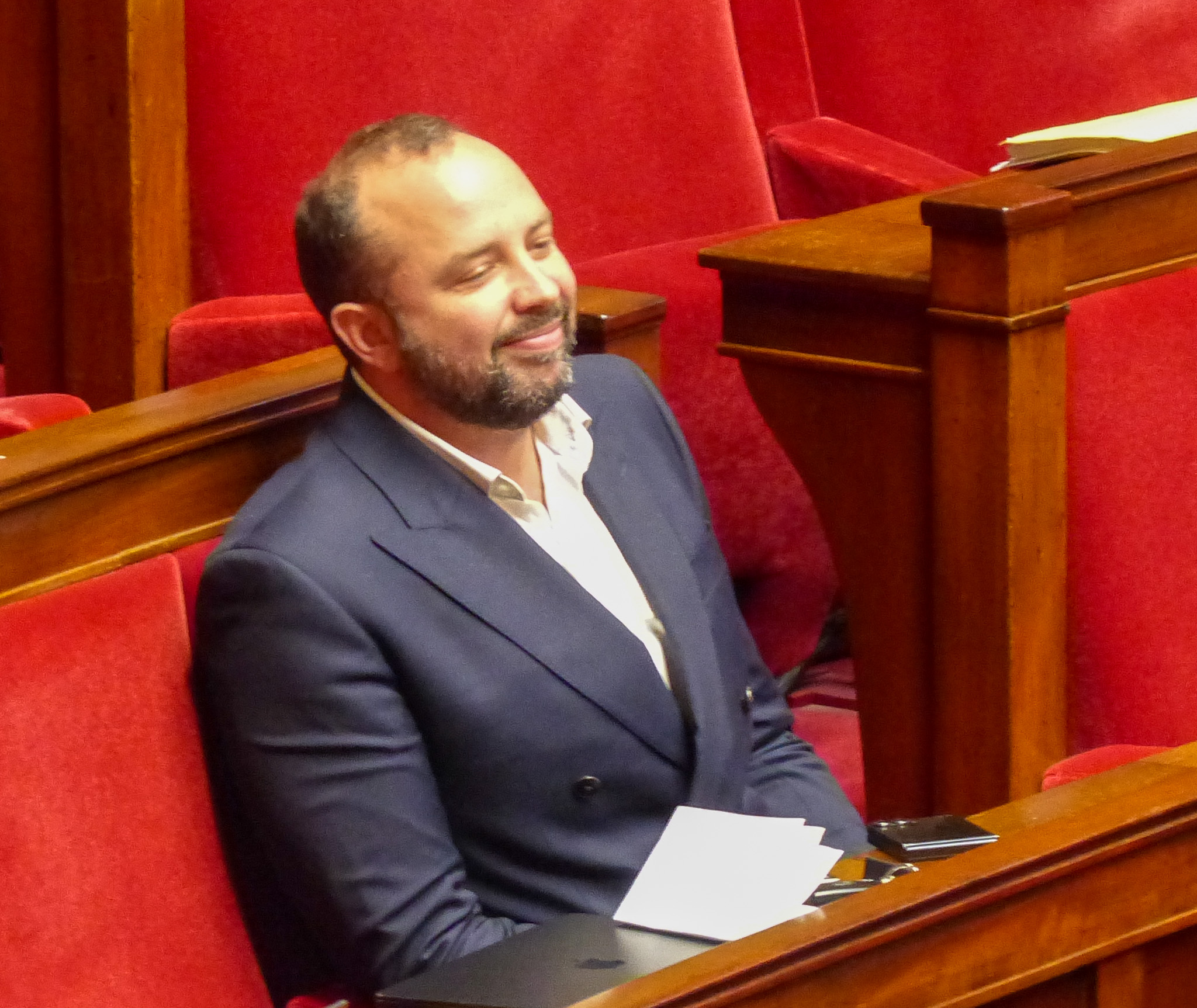
- Verny in 2026

Member of the National Assembly for Bouches-du-Rhône's 14th constituency
- Incumbent
- Assumed office 8 July 2024
- Preceded by: Anne-Laurence Petel

Personal details
- Born: 23 December 1984 (age 41) Bourgoin-Jallieu, France
- Party: Union of the Right for the Republic (2024–present)
- Other political affiliations: Reconquête (2022–2024); The Republicans (2024)

Gérault Verny (French pronunciation: [ʒeʁo vɛʁni]; born 23 December 1984) is a French businessman and politician of the Union of the Right for the Republic (UDR) who has represented the 14th constituency of Bouches-du-Rhône in the National Assembly since 2024.

== Career ==
Verny is a former member of Reconquête (2022–2024) and The Republicans (2024). He was active in Éric Zemmour's 2022 presidential campaign.

In the 2024 legislative election, Verny ran as a member of the Union of the Right for the Republic (UDR) and defeated Jean-David Ciot of the Socialist Party and incumbent Anne-Laurence Petel of Renaissance in the 14th constituency of Bouches-du-Rhône with 37.2% of the second-round vote.

In Parliament, he is a member of the Committee on Finance.
