= Sébastien Delogu =

French politician (born 1987)

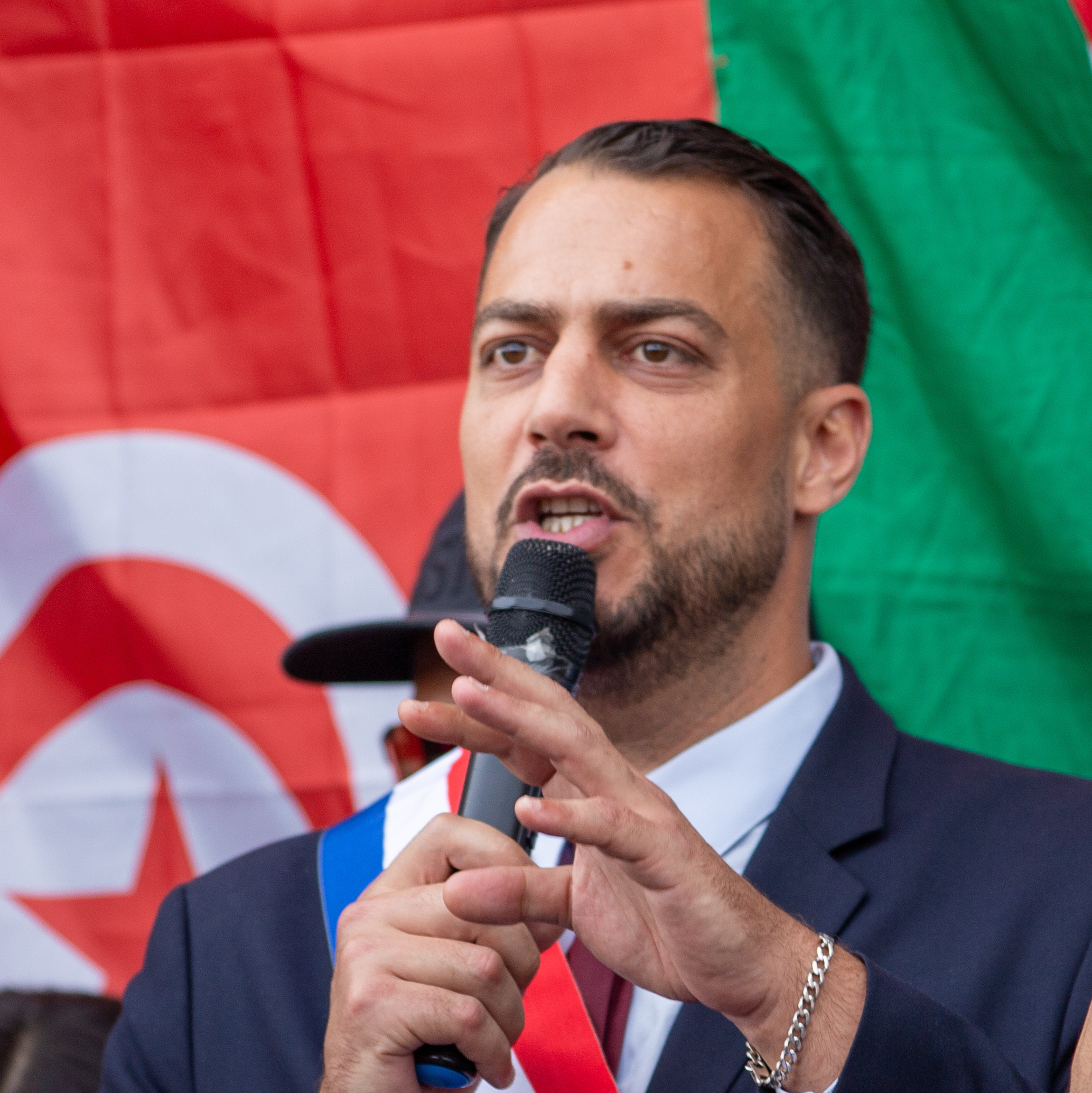

Member of the National Assembly for Bouches-du-Rhône's 7th constituency
- Incumbent
- Assumed office 22 June 2022
- Preceded by: Saïd Ahamada

Personal details
- Born: Sébastien Victor Delogu; 8 June 1987 (age 39) Marseille, France
- Party: La France Insoumise (2017–present)
- Other political affiliations: French Communist Party (until 2017)
- Profession: Politician; trade unionist; taxicab driver

Sébastien Victor Delogu (French pronunciation: [sebastjɛ̃ viktɔʁ delɔɡy]; born 8 June 1987) is a French politician and trade unionist of La France Insoumise who has been representing Bouches-du-Rhône's 7th constituency in the National Assembly since 2022. A taxicab driver by profession, Delogu rose to prominence in 2016 after becoming the spokesperson for taxicab drivers in Marseille during their strike against Uber.

Initially affiliated with the French Communist Party, Delogu joined La France Insoumise in 2017 to support the campaign of Jean-Luc Mélenchon in the 2017 legislative election. He was later elected to the National Assembly in the 2022 legislative election, and reelected in the 2024 legislative election.

== Early life and education ==
Delogu was born on 8 June 1987 in Marseille. His mother was a trade unionist for the General Confederation of Labour (CGT) in Bouches-du-Rhône and vice-president of the employment tribunal in Aix-en-Provence, while his father was a taxicab driver. Through his mother, Delogu has Algerian and Spanish ancestry, while he has Armenian and Sardinian ancestry through his father. Delogu was raised in northern Marseille, in the inner city of the 15th arrondissement.

Delogu's only formal qualification is his taxi driver’s license. He worked as a clothing salesperson and security guard, before resuming his studies following the birth of his first child. Delogu was evicted from his home in 2012, and afterwards was homeless and lived out of his car. He subsequently became involved with the National Housing Confederation (CNL) in France.

== Political career ==
In 2016, Delogu became the spokesperson of the taxicab drivers in Marseille during their strike against Uber, having worked as a nighttime taxicab driver near the Old Port of Marseille for nine years. He also served as the Marseille representative in the national Taxi de France trade union. Delogu's union activities led him to meet Danielle Simonnet, and he later joined her political party La France Insoumise (LFI) in 2017. Having previously been affiliated with the French Communist Party, he chose to leave the party due to what he felt was a lack of diversity in the party's ranks. During the 2017 legislative election, Delogu volunteered as a driver and bodyguard for Jean-Luc Mélenchon, and left his profession as a taxicab driver in order to focus on the campaign. Following the conclusion of the campaign, Delogu did not return to his career as a taxicab driver and instead organized the renovation project of a preschool in the inner city of Marseille. He additionally worked as a bartender and at concert venues.

Delogu stood as a candidate in the 2019 European Parliament election in France, as the twenty-fourth candidate on the LFI list. During the campaign, Delogu organized a number of symbolic actions around Marseille, including the usage of smoke bombs in L'Estaque to denounce pollution caused by cruise ships. The party ultimately won six seats in the European Parliament, and Delogu was not elected. He had initially been slated to lead the LFI party list in Marseille during the 2020 municipal elections, but withdrew from the race in July 2019 due to the party's poor performance in the European Parliament election.

=== Member of the National Assembly ===
In 2022, Delogu was selected to stand as a candidate for LFI and the New Ecological and Social People's Union (NUPES) electoral alliance in the 7th constituency of Bouches-du-Rhône in the 2022 legislative election. Following the first round of voting, Delogu came first, and he was later elected in the second round with 64.68% of the vote. Upon his election, he was seated in the National Assembly.

In March 2024, Delogu filed a request for a parliamentary inquiry into Marseille en grand, an investment plan announced by Emmanuel Macron in 2021, following a report from the Cour des Comptes and the Regional Chamber of Auditors which highlighted its weaknesses and dysfunctions.

On 28 May 2024, Delogu was suspended from the National Assembly for 15 days and docked half of his parliamentary salary for two months after waving the flag of Palestine during a parliamentary debate on the French recognition of the State of Palestine. This came two days after the Tel al-Sultan attack, where about 50 Palestinians were killed by Israeli airstrikes on the Tel al-Sultan refugee camp in the Gaza Strip. All of the left-wing parties in the National Assembly opposed Delogu's suspension, including LFI, the Socialist Party, The Ecologists, and the French Communist Party. Naïma Moutchou of the center-right Horizons and vice-president of the National Assembly also criticized the suspension, claiming that it undermines the "credibility as an institution" of the Assembly as Sébastien Nadot was given just a warning for waving a flag in parliament. LFI also pointed to Yaël Braun-Pivet of the centrist Renaissance, who wore an Israeli flag on her jacket in parliament. The reason given for Delogu's suspension was that his actions constituted "a demonstration disturbing the order or a tumultuous scene", provided for by Article 70 of the internal regulations of parliament. Scholar Benjamin Morel noted that the suspension was "very elevated, more than what is practiced for this type of act" and that it "remains a political assessment, according to the sensitivity of the subject, linked to its conjuncture and political reading". Delogu later brought the case to the European Court of Human Rights two days later.

In the 2024 legislative election, Delogu was reelected to the National Assembly in his constituency in the first round, receiving 59.67% of the vote and avoiding a runoff.

== Legal case ==
As of 2024, Delogu is facing trial for "aggravated violence" and "refusal to submit to identification survey operations" regarding an incident that took place in front of the Saint-Exupéry high school in his constituency on 10 March 2023. A communication from the public prosecutor's office reports that an investigation was opened against him on suspicion of having caused, for two of the high school's members of management, "a total incapacity for work (French: incapacité totale de travail, ITT) not exceeding eight days" after he kicked their ankles during a protest against the pensions reform on that day. A first hearing on 13 December 2023 was adjourned to 25 June 2024 and then to January 2025 to avoid a judgment during the legislative elections campaign.

== See also ==
- List of deputies of the 16th National Assembly of France
- List of deputies of the 17th National Assembly of France
