= Christian Kert =

French politician

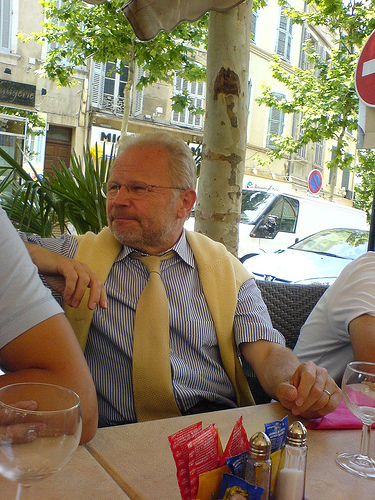
Christian Kert

Christian Kert (born 25 July 1946 in Salon-de-Provence, Bouches-du-Rhône) is a member of the National Assembly of France. He represented Bouches-du-Rhône's 11th constituency, from 1988 to 2012 as a member of the Union for a Popular Movement.
