= Saïd Ahamada =

French politician

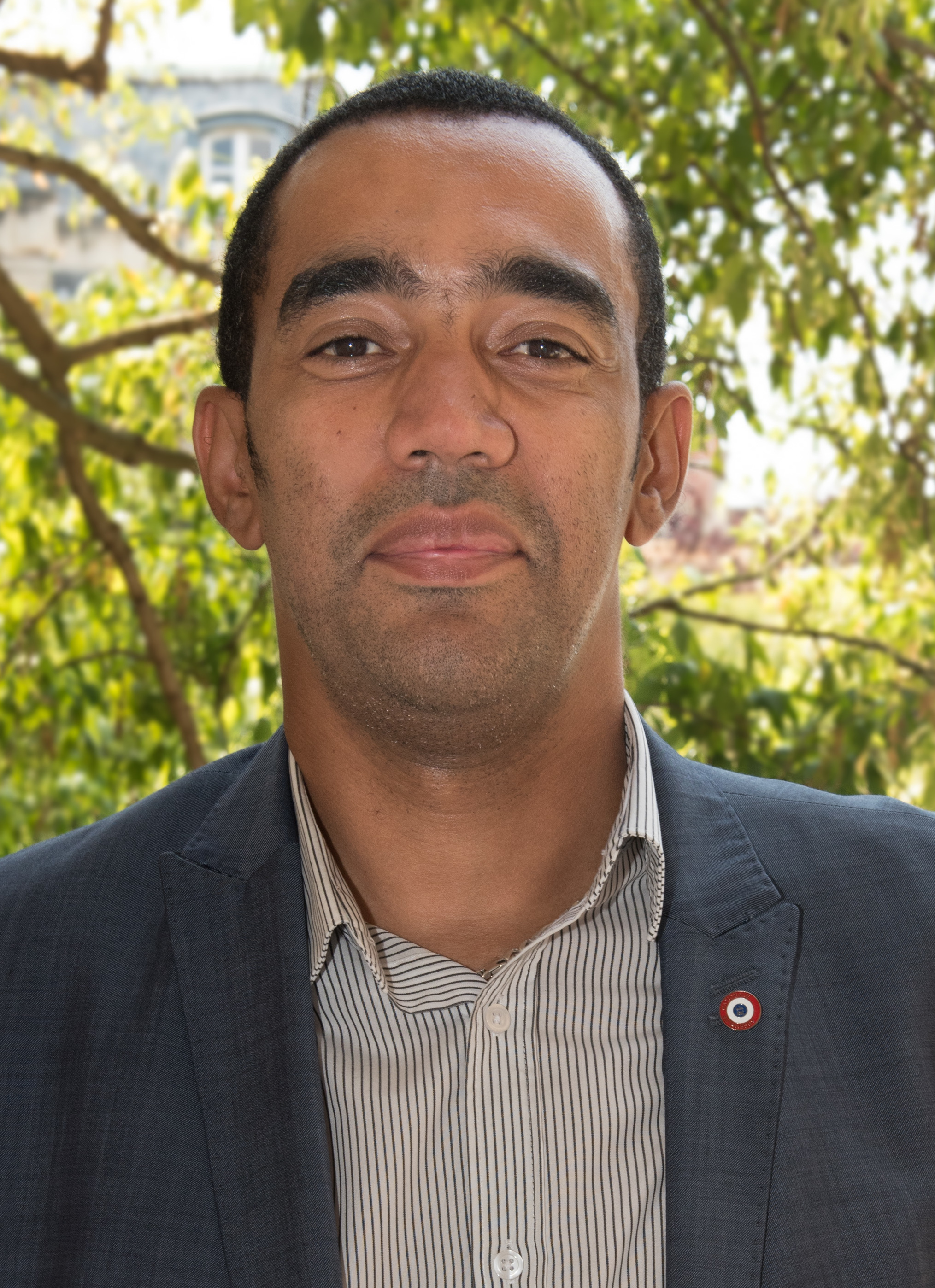

Member of the National Assembly for Bouches-du-Rhône's 7th constituency
- In office 21 June 2017 – 21 June 2022
- Preceded by: Henri Jibrayel
- Succeeded by: Sébastien Delogu

Personal details
- Born: 7 November 1972 (age 52); Saint-Denis, Réunion, France
- Political party: Renaissance

Saïd Ahamada (born 7 November 1972) is a French politician of Renaissance (RE) who served as a member of the National Assembly from 2017 to 2022, representing the 7th constituency of the department of Bouches-du-Rhône. He was also spokesman of the Renaissance parliamentary group from 2019 to 2020.

He was born in Saint-Denis in the French overseas department of Réunion.

== Early life and education ==
Ahamada's father is Comorian and his mother is from La Réunion from European descent ("Petit Blanc des hauts"). The family moved to Marseille when Saïd Ahamada was a baby.

Ahamada holds a master's degree in finance.

== Political career ==
Having previously been a member of the Democratic Movement (MoDem) and later Europe Ecology – The Greens, Ahamada joined LREM in 2017.

From 18 June 2017, Ahamada was a member of the National Assembly for the 7th constituency of the Bouches-du-Rhône department, which includes part of the 14th arrondissement of Marseille as well as its 15th and 16th arrondissements (the "Quartiers Nord"). In parliament, he served as member of the Finance Committee. In addition to his committee assignments, he was part of the French-Algerian Parliamentary Friendship Group.

In early 2018, Ahamada was one of several LREM members who joined an informal parliamentary working group on Islam set up by Florent Boudié in order to contribute to the government's bill aimed at better organising and supervising the financing of the Muslim faith in France.

From 2019, Ahamada served as one of his parliamentary group's spokespersons under the leadership of its chairman Gilles Le Gendre.

In 2021, Ahamada was mandated by Prime Minister Jean Castex to draft a governmental report on creating equal living conditions between Metropolitan France and the country's overseas departments and regions.

In the 2022 French legislative election Ahamanda lost his seat after being eliminated in the first round.

== Political positions ==
Ahamada has advocated for banning the National Rally (RN).
