= Sylvie Andrieux =

French politician (born 1961)

Member of the National Assembly of France for Bouches-du-Rhône's 7th constituency
- In office 1997 French legislative election – 2012
- Preceded by: Bernard Leccia
- Succeeded by: Henri Jibrayel

Member of the National Assembly of France for Bouches-du-Rhône's 3rd constituency
- In office 2012–2016
- Preceded by: Jean Roatta
- Succeeded by: Alexandra Louis

Regional Councilor of Provence-Alpes-Côte d'Azur
- Incumbent
- Assumed office 23 March 1992

Municipal councillor of Marseille
- In office 19 March 2001 – 12 January 2003

Personal details
- Born: 15 December 1961 (age 64) Marseille, Bouches-du-Rhône, France
- Party: none (formerly: PS)
- Other political affiliations: none (formerly:SRC (National Assembly group))
- Committees: Finance, General Economy and Planning Committee

Sylvie Andrieux (born 15 December 1961, in Marseille) was a member of the National Assembly of France. She represented the department of Bouches-du-Rhône, from 1997 to 2016 and sat initially as a member of Socialiste, radical, citoyen et divers gauche. She is implicated in the scandal of misappropriation of the Conseil régional de Provence-Alpes-Côte d'Azur subventions

She was a member of Le Droit Humain until she resigned in 2012.

In May 2013, having been convicted of misappropriation of public funds, she was excluded from the Socialist Party, and thenceforth sat as an independent in the National Assembly. In November 2016, she was finally sentenced to one year's imprisonment and a three-year suspended prison term.
