= Jean Roatta =

French politician

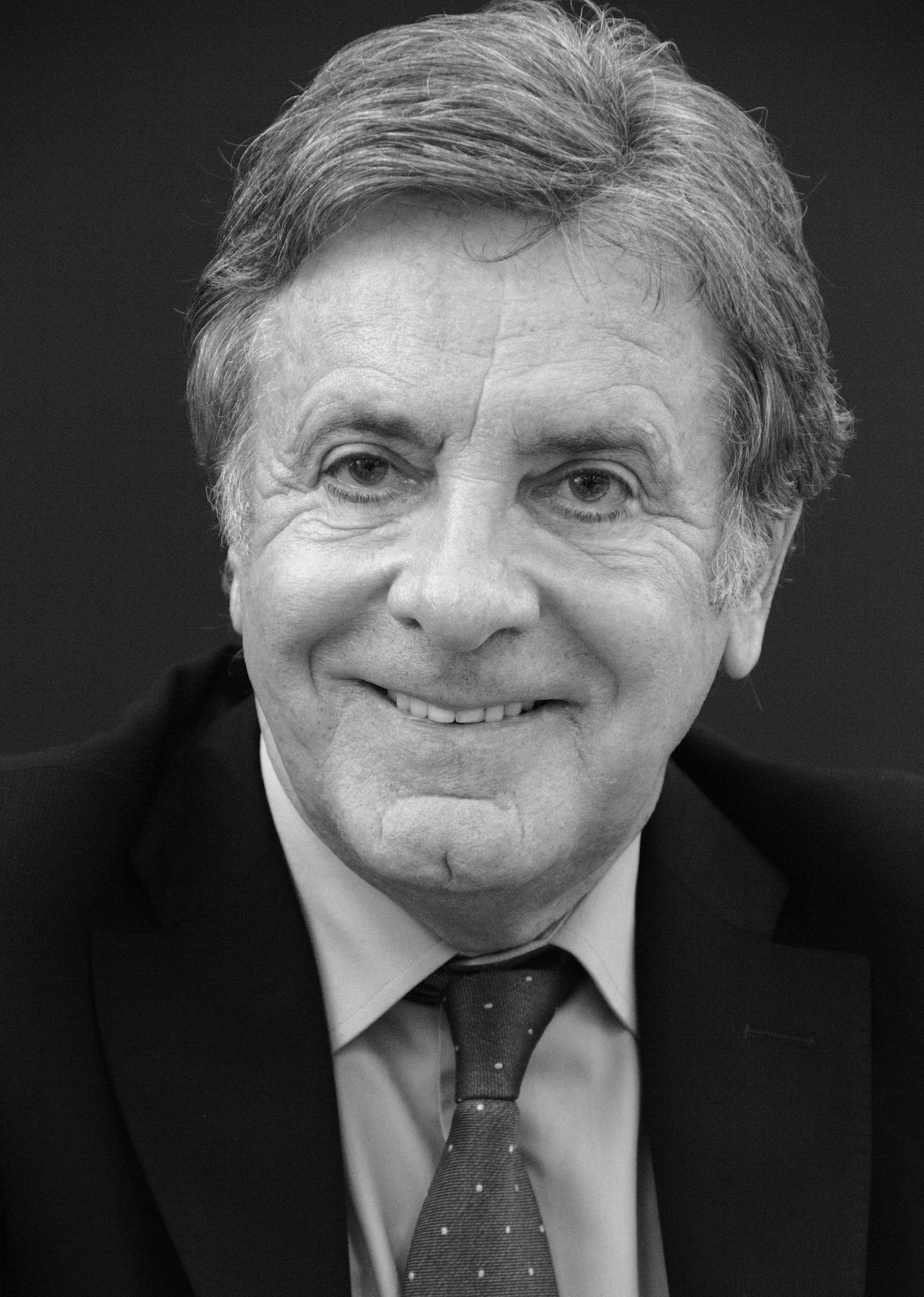
- Jean Roatta in May 2013
- Parliamentary group: UDF (1993-2002); UMP (2003 onwards)

Deputy for Bouches-du-Rhône's 3rd constituency in the National Assembly of France
- In office 1993–2012
- Preceded by: Philippe Sanmarco
- Succeeded by: Sylvie Andrieux

Personal details
- Born: 13 December 1941 (age 84) Marseille

Jean Roatta (born 13 December 1941 in Marseille) was the deputy for Bouches-du-Rhône's 3rd constituency in the National Assembly of France from 1993 to 2012, as a member of Union for French Democracy and then the Union for a Popular Movement.
