= Anne-Laurence Petel =

French politician

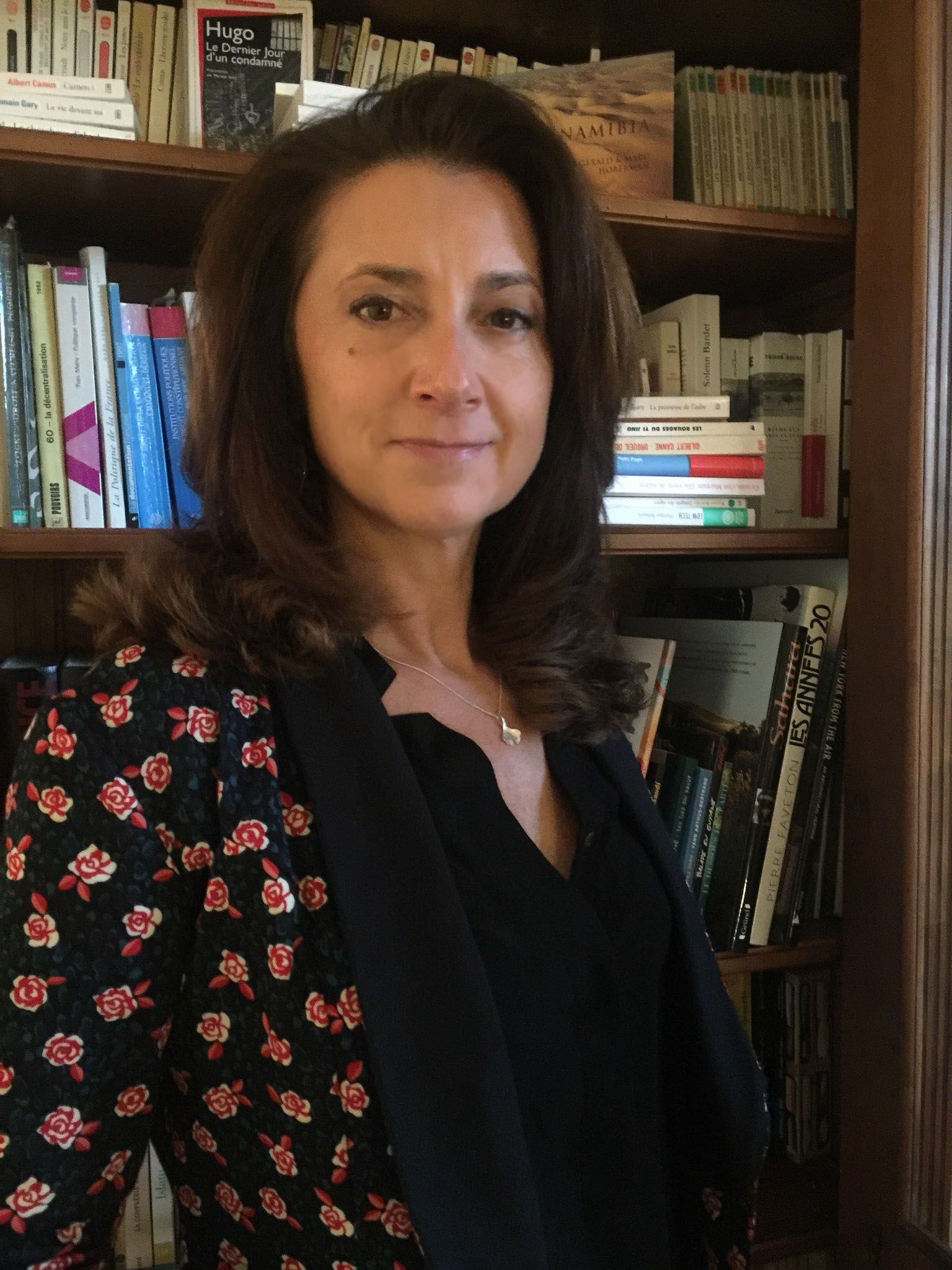

Member of the National Assembly for Bouches-du-Rhône's 14th constituency
- In office 21 June 2017 – 9 june 2024
- Preceded by: Jean-David Ciot
- Succeeded by: Gérault Verny

Personal details
- Born: 8 February 1970 (age 56) Saint-Raphaël, Var, France
- Party: Renaissance
- Occupation: Politician

Anne-Laurence Petel (born 8 February 1970) is a French politician of Renaissance (RE) who has been serving as a member of the National Assembly from the 2017 elections to 2024, representing the 14th district of Bouches-du-Rhône, which includes Aix-en-Provence.

== Political career ==
In parliament, Petel serves on the Committee on Economic Affairs. In this capacity, she was the parliament's co-rapporteur – alongside Antoine Savignat – on government aid for private businesses amid the COVID-19 pandemic in France.

In addition to her committee assignments, Petel is part of the French-Armenian Parliamentary Friendship Group and the French-Ethiopian Parliamentary Friendship Group.

Since November 2017, Petel has been part of LREM's executive board under the leadership of the party's successive chairmen Christophe Castaner and Stanislas Guerini.

She was re-elected in the 2022 elections.

== Other activities ==
- Caisse des dépôts et consignations, Member of the Supervisory Board
