= Mohamed Laqhila =

French politician (born 1959)

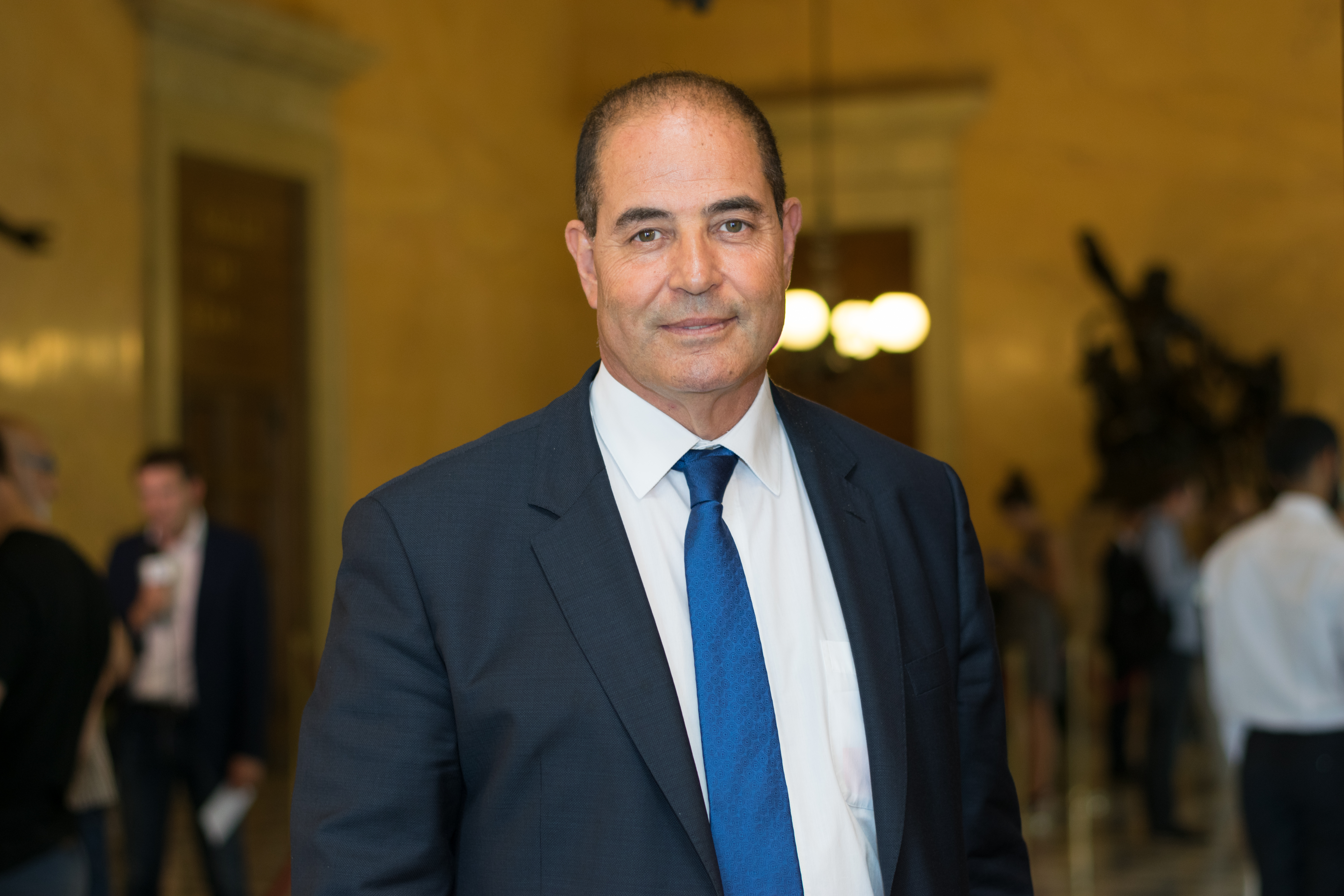
- Mohamed Laqhila in 2017

Member of the National Assembly for Bouches-du-Rhône's 11th constituency
- In office 21 June 2017 – 9 June 2024
- Preceded by: Christian Kert
- Succeeded by: Marc Péna

Personal details
- Born: 3 August 1959 (age 67) Oulmes, Morocco
- Party: MoDem
- Education: Aix-Marseille University
- Profession: Chartered accountant

Mohamed Laqhila (born 3 August 1959) is a French accountant and politician. On 18 June 2017, he was elected the member of the National Assembly for the 11th district of the Bouches-du-Rhône.

== Biography ==
His father is a Moroccan immigrant worker. He holds a postgraduate degree in “money, banking, and finance” from the Aix-Marseille University.

A certified public accountant since 1991, married with three children, he was president of the Order of Certified Public Accountants for the Provence-Alpes-Côte d'Azur region from 2012 to 2016, then president of the National Federation of Certified Public Accountants and Auditors, from which he resigned following his election as a member of parliament. At the Higher Council of the Order of Chartered Accountants, he was for many years head of the Sustainable Development and CSR (Corporate social responsibility) Commission.

He was elected representative of the eleventh district of Bouches-du-Rhône in the 2017 legislative elections for the Democratic Movement (France) with 50.95% of the votes in the second round.

In his declaration of interests and activities registered by the Haute Autorité pour la transparence de la vie publique Life in February 2018, he states that he is a member of the board of directors of several organizations and companies, and that he has direct financial holdings in the capital of several companies amounting to €3.6 million.

As the signatory and sponsor of an amendment adopted in plenary session on November 15, 2019, which allowed Palm oil to remain among the Biofuel until 2026 (and thus granted Total an estimated tax benefit of between €70 and €80 million per year), he wishes to “support Total in its investment”. The adoption of the amendment caused a stir, and during a second vote the following day, the same amendment was rejected.

He was the lead candidate in the 2020 municipal elections in Aix-en-Provence, but only obtained 553 votes, or 1.76%.

He was re-elected as a member of parliament in 2022. Running for re-election in the 2024 legislative elections, he came third in the first round and decided to withdraw his candidacy to block the National Rally candidate. He was succeeded by the Socialist candidate, Marc Pena.

== See also ==
- List of deputies of the 15th National Assembly of France
- List of deputies of the 16th National Assembly of France
