= Gisèle Lelouis =

French politician (born 1952)

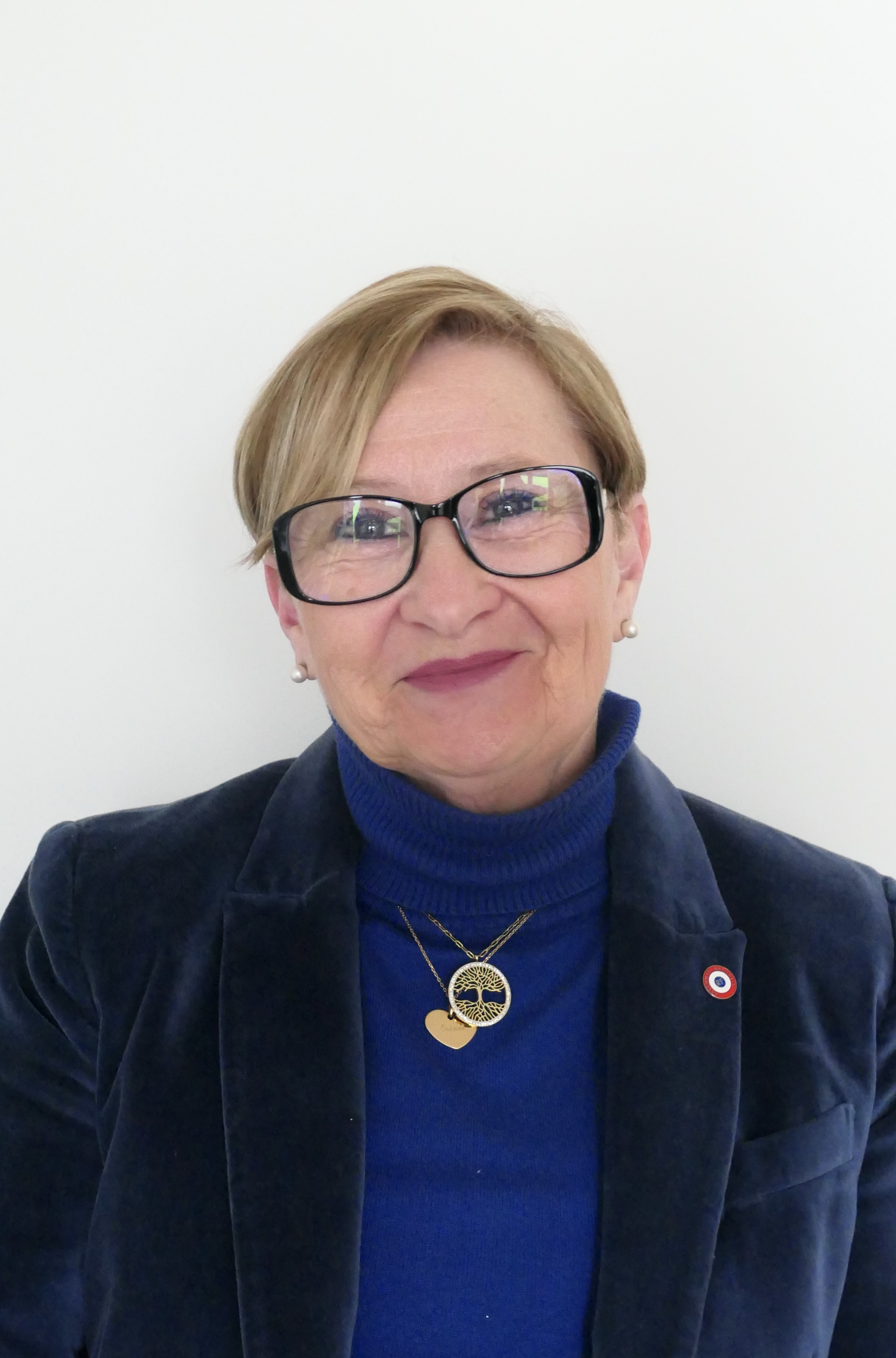

Member of the National Assembly for Bouches-du-Rhône's 3rd constituency
- Incumbent
- Assumed office 22 June 2022
- Preceded by: Alexandra Louis

Personal details
- Born: 10 March 1952 (age 74) Paris, France
- Party: National Rally

Gisèle Lelouis (French pronunciation: [ʒizɛlə ləlwi]; born 10 March 1952) is a French politician who has represented the 3rd constituency of the Bouches-du-Rhône department in the National Assembly since 2022. A member of the National Rally (RN), she has also been a municipal councillor of Marseille since 2014.

== See also ==
- List of deputies of the 16th National Assembly of France
