= Results of the 2024 French legislative election in Sarthe =

Following the first round of the 2024 French legislative election on 30 June 2024, runoff elections in each constituency where no candidate received a vote share greater than 50 percent were scheduled for 7 July. Candidates permitted to stand in the runoff elections needed to either come in first or second place in the first round or achieve more than 12.5 percent of the votes of the entire electorate (as opposed to 12.5 percent of the vote share due to low turnout).

== Sarthe ==
=== 1st constituency ===
Candidate	Party or alliance		First round		Second round	
Candidate	Party or alliance		Votes	%	Votes	%
Céline de Cossé Brissac	National Rally		16,465	33.60	18,646	39.09
Julie Delpech	Ensemble	Renaissance	15,111	30.84	29,050	60.91
Ghislaine Bonnet	New Popular Front	La France Insoumise	12,258	25.01		
Clément Coulon	The Republicans		4,459	9.10		
Sylvie Maillet	Far-left	Lutte Ouvrière	710	1.45		
Total			49,003	100.00	47,696	100.00
Valid votes			49,003	96.78	47,696	94.15
Invalid votes			419	0.83	482	0.95
Blank votes			1,213	2.40	2,481	4.90
Total votes			50,635	100.00	50,659	100.00
Registered voters/turnout			73,766	68.64	73,786	68.66

=== 2nd constituency ===
Candidate	Party or alliance		First round		Second round	
Candidate	Party or alliance		Votes	%	Votes	%
Marietta Karamanli	New Popular Front	Socialist Party	20,700	39.95	28,660	57.31
François Fèvre	Union of the far right	The Republicans	18,282	35.29	21,349	42.69
Samuel Chevallier	Ensemble	Union of Democrats and Independents	11,962	23.09		
Thomas Hubert	Far-left	Lutte Ouvrière	776	1.50		
Clément Cheuret	Independent		91	0.18		
Total			51,811	100.00	50,009	100.00
Valid votes			51,811	96.58	50,009	92.97
Invalid votes			322	0.60	563	1.05
Blank votes			1,510	2.81	3,221	5.99
Total votes			53,643	100.00	53,793	100.00
Registered voters/turnout			83,764	64.04	83,779	64.21

=== 3rd constituency ===
Candidate	Party or alliance		First round		Second round	
Candidate	Party or alliance		Votes	%	Votes	%
Romain Lemoigne	National Rally		23,637	42.54	26,799	48.56
Eric Martineau	Ensemble	Democratic Movement	16,209	29.17	28,392	51.44
Mathilde Jack	New Popular Front	La France Insoumise	10,319	18.57		
Vincent Gruau	The Republicans		2,819	5.07		
Raymond De Malherbe	Reconquête		1,131	2.04		
Maryse Brutout	Far-left	Lutte Ouvrière	885	1.59		
Éric Trochon	Sovereigntist right	Debout la France	558	1.00		
Total			55,558	100.00	55,191	100.00
Valid votes			55,558	96.58	55,191	95.10
Invalid votes			647	1.12	860	1.48
Blank votes			1,318	2.29	1,981	3.41
Total votes			57,523	100.00	58,032	100.00
Registered voters/turnout			85,878	66.98	85,894	67.56

=== 4th constituency ===
Candidate	Party or alliance		First round		Second round	
Candidate	Party or alliance		Votes	%	Votes	%
Marie-Caroline Le Pen	National Rally		20,584	39.26	23,911	49.77
Élise Leboucher	New Popular Front	La France Insoumise	13,600	25.94	24,136	50.23
Sylvie Casenave-Péré	Ensemble	Renaissance	13,565	25.88		
Léo Brisard	The Republicans		2,316	4.42		
Didier Barbet	Miscellaneous right	Independent	1,546	2.95		
Thierry Nouchy	Far-left	Lutte Ouvrière	596	1.14		
Jean-Michel Brugade	Regionalists	Independent	217	0.41		
Total			52,424	100.00	48,047	100.00
Valid votes			52,424	96.83	48,047	89.13
Invalid votes			469	0.87	1,155	2.14
Blank votes			1,250	2.31	4,705	8.73
Total votes			54,143	100.00	53,907	100.00
Registered voters/turnout			81,439	66.48	81,461	66.18

=== 5th constituency ===
Candidate	Party or alliance		First round		Second round	
Candidate	Party or alliance		Votes	%	Votes	%
Pierre Vaugarny	National Rally		21,870	38.23	24,102	42.96
Jean-Carles Grelier	Ensemble	Renaissance	17,898	31.28	32,006	57.04
Christophe Rouillon	New Popular Front	Socialist Party	15,261	26.67		
Cécile Bayle de Jessé	Sovereigntist right	Debout la France	1,285	2.25		
Karine Fouquet	Far-left	Lutte Ouvrière	899	1.57		
Total			57,213	100.00	56,108	100.00
Valid votes			57,213	96.84	56,108	94.82
Invalid votes			500	0.85	620	1.05
Blank votes			1,367	2.31	2,443	4.13
Total votes			59,080	100.00	59,171	100.00
Registered voters/turnout			87,980	67.15	88,004	67.24
