= 2001 French municipal elections =

Municipal elections were held in France on 11 and 18 March 2001. These elections were marked by a setback for the left and a victory for the right one year before the 2002 presidential election. However, the capital, Paris, and the second largest city, Lyon, both switched to the left.

Following the second round, the right controlled 318 municipalities, the left 259.

The next elections were scheduled for 2007, but were rescheduled to 2008 to avoid interfering with the legislative and presidential elections of 2007.

== Results in major cities ==
City	Population (1999)	Incumbent	Elected
Paris	2 125 246	Jean Tiberi	Bertrand Delanoë
Marseille	798 430	Jean-Claude Gaudin	
Lyon	445 452	Raymond Barre	Gérard Collomb
Toulouse	390 350	Dominique Baudis	Philippe Douste-Blazy
Nice	342 738	Jacques Peyrat	
Nantes	270 251	Jean-Marc Ayrault	
Strasbourg	264 115	Catherine Trautmann	Fabienne Keller
Montpellier	225 392	Georges Frêche	
Bordeaux	215 363	Alain Juppé	
Lille	212 597	Pierre Mauroy	Martine Aubry
Rennes	206 229	Edmond Hervé	
Le Havre	190 905	Antoine Rufenacht	
Reims	187 206	Jean-Louis Schneiter	
Saint-Étienne	180 210	Michel Thiollière	
Toulon	160 639	Jean-Marie Le Chevallier	Hubert Falco
Grenoble	153 317	Michel Destot	
Angers	151 279	Jean-Claude Antonini	
Dijon	149 867	Robert Poujade	François Rebsamen
Brest	149 634	Pierre Maille	François Cuillandre
Le Mans	146 105	Robert Jarry	Jean-Claude Boulard
Clermont-Ferrand	137 140	Serge Godard	
Amiens	135 510	Gilles de Robien	
Aix-en-Provence	134 222	Jean-François Picheral	Maryse Joissains-Masini
Limoges	137 140	Alain Rodet	
Nîmes	133 424	Alain Clary	Jean-Paul Fournier
Limoges	132 820	Jean Germain	

=== Municipal councillors of cities with 35,000+ population ===
Party/alliance	Seats
PS–PCF–MDC–PRG	9775
RPR–UDF–DL	9722
Miscellaneous right	5873
Miscellaneous left	2518
Miscellaneous	649
MNR	157
Les Verts	123
FN	106
Ecologists	48
Far-left	41
Regionalists	13

== Results by party ==
=== Left (PS, PCF, Greens) ===
==== Communists ====
The number of cities of over 30,000 inhabitants held by the communists shrank from 37 to 27 following the 2001 municipal elections. After the loss of Le Havre after the preceding municipal elections, the Communist Party lost the cities it managed to reconquer in 1995 (La Ciotat, Sète, Nîmes) like some of its former bastions (Drancy, Argenteuil, Dieppe, Montluçon).

The gain of Sevran and Arles (from the Socialist Party) were not enough to reverse the progressive collapse of "municipal Communism", a tendency which began with the 1983 election (with the loss of Nîmes, Sète, Reims, Levallois-Perret, Antony, or Sèvres) and was confirmed in 1989 with the loss of Amiens.

==== Socialists ====
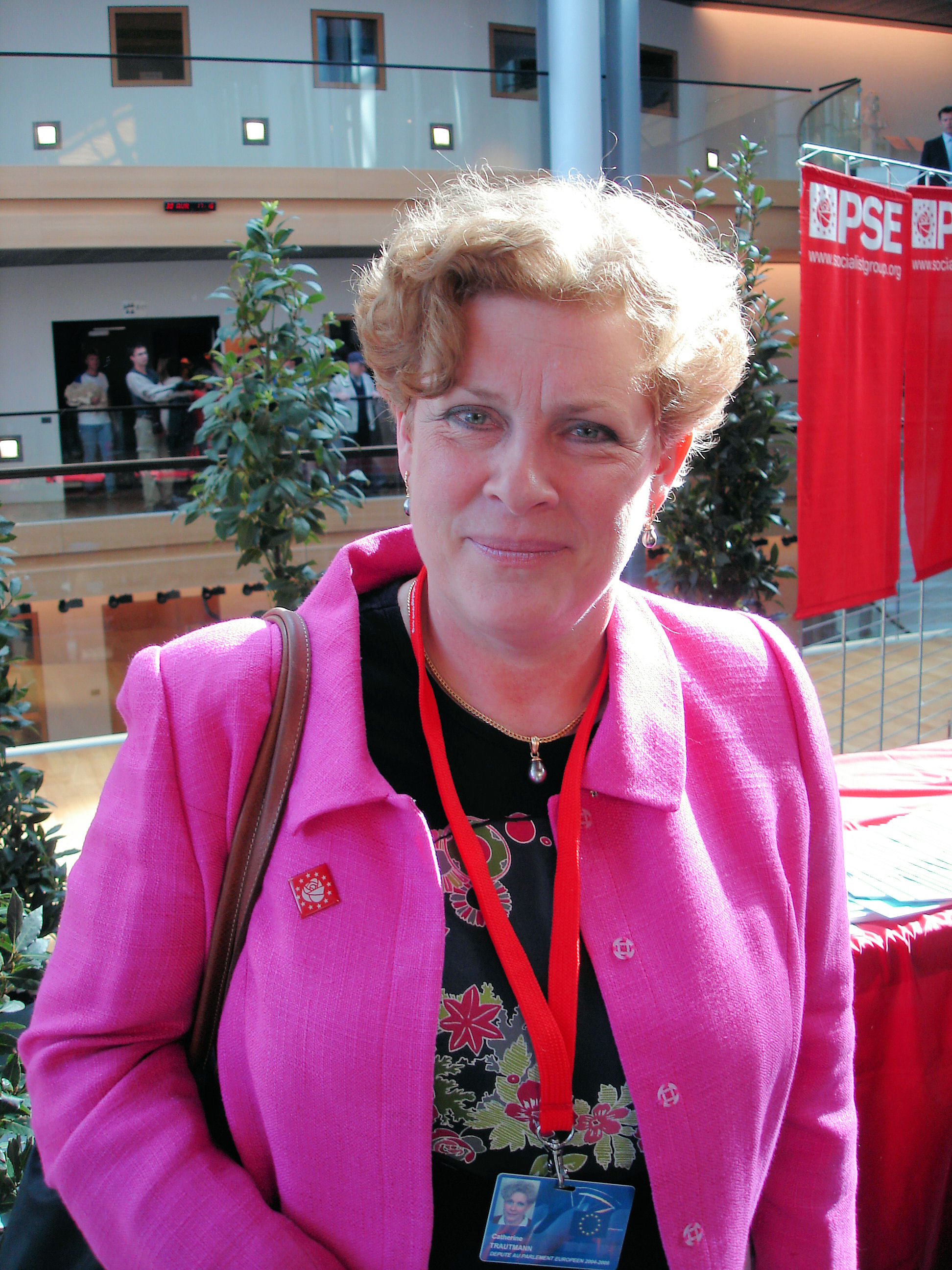
Catherine Trautmann, defeated in Strasbourg by the UDF

The French Socialist Party lost in total eight cities of more than thirty thousand inhabitants, with several party personalities undergoing defeat in their respective towns. Catherine Trautmann, minister of Culture, was not re-elected in Strasbourg, like Jack Lang in Blois. In Avignon, Élisabeth Guigou failed to unseat the RPR incumbent, Marie-Josée Roig. Martine Aubry became mayor of Lille with only 49.6% of the votes (and with a 53% abstention) in this city which had historically been solid for the Socialists. Their victories in several cities such as Ajaccio, Auxerre (helped by the presence of two right-wing candidates in the second round), Dijon, or Salon-de-Provence, or in the major cities of Paris and Lyon, did not counterbalance the party's losses.

==== The Greens ====
The Greens won Saumur, their first city of over 30,000 inhabitants, with over 50% of the votes in the first round. The Greens began to emerge as the second most important party in the "plural left" after the Socialist Party, to the disadvantage of the Communists. In cities where they ran against socialist and communist lists, the Greens scored remarkable successes, such as in Grenoble (20%), Lille (15,5%), Besançon (16,1%), and in some Parisian arrondissements where they scored close to 20% in the first round of voting.

The support of the PS by the Greens in the second round contributed to the victory of the left in Paris and Lyon.

=== Far-left (LO, LCR) ===
==== Workers' Struggle ====
Workers' Struggle ran 128 lists in 109 different cities, which won 4.37% of the votes, or 120,347 votes. LO obtained 33 councillors including 11 women, in 22 different cities, without amalgamating its lists with those of the plural left in the second round.

==== Revolutionary Communist League ====
Revolutionary Communist League ran or "supported" (according to their terms) 91 lists, common with various coalition partners. It obtained 4.52%, or 93,182 votes. By the first round, these lists obtained 26 elected officials. Several lists then amalgamated with lists of the plural left, including of the MDC.

=== Right (RPR, UDF, DL) ===
Despite the losses in Lyon and Paris, the parliamentary right made important gains: it gained forty municipalities of more than 15,000 inhabitants in addition to those it already controlled, and gains from the left several towns of 30,000 inhabitants, including:

- Strasbourg: victory of the list of Fabienne Keller (UDF) (with 50.85% of the votes) with over Catherine Trautmann, incumbent
- Rouen: Pierre Albertini (UDF) won with 51.25% of the voices, against the outgoing mayor Yvon Robert (who won in 1995).
- Aix-en-Provence: Maryse Joissains-Masini (DVD) won with 50.60% of the voices against 49.40% for Jean-François Picheral (PS), mayor since 1989
- Nîmes: the Communist mayor Alain Clary (elected in 1995 in a four-way runoff) obtained only 44.33% of the votes, which elected Jean-Paul Fournier (RPR) with 55.66% of the voices).
- Quimper: Alain Gerard (RPR) won the city (with 52.13% of the votes), from the Socialist Jean-Claude Joseph (47.87%) after the socialist incumbent decided not to run for re-election.
- Blois: Nicolas Perruchot (UDF) defeated the Minister for National Education Jack Lang by 37 votes(45.31% of the votes against 45.09%) in spite of the presence of the candidate of the FN.

The right held to the cities of Toulouse, Marseille, and Nice, with the victory of the lists led by Philippe Douste-Blazy in the first (55% of the votes), by Jean-Claude Gaudin in the second (48.5% of the votes) and by Jacques Peyrat in the third (44.48% of the votes).

=== Far-right (FN, MNR) ===
In 1995, the candidates of the FN had carried the towns of Toulon, Marignane, Orange and later Vitrolles in 1997. In 2001, Jean-Marie Le Chevallier, mayor of Toulon (MNR, ex-FN) was beaten by the first round, obtaining only 7.78% of the votes. The mayor of Orange, Jacques Bompard (FN, now MPF) was re-elected by the first round and the mayor of Marignane, Daniel Simonpieri (MNR), by the second round with 62.52% of the votes, against 37.48% for Guy Martin (DL). In Vitrolles, Catherine Mégret (MNR) was initially re-elected with 45.32% of the voices against 44.07% for Domenica Tichadou (PS) but her election was invalidated afterwards. She was finally defeated by Guy Obino (PS) in 2002.

The strong presence of both MNR and FN lists in numerous cities caused the failure of many far-right candidates to reach the runoff, as many FN candidates had done in 1995.
