= Morançais =

Morançais is a French surname that it may refer to:

- Béatrice Pavy-Morançais, French politician
- Christelle Morançais, French politician
