= Sarthe's 5th constituency =

Constituency of the National Assembly of France

5th constituency of the Sarthe
- inline Constituency of the National Assembly of France

- The constituency in Sarthe
- Deputy: Jean-Carles Grelier; DVD
- Department: Sarthe
- Cantons: Ballon, Bonnétable, La Ferté-Bernard, La Fresnaye-sur-Chédouet, Mamers, Le Mans Nord-Campagne, Le Mans Nord-Ville, Marolles-les-Braults, Montmirail, Tuffé, Vibraye

The 5th constituency of the Sarthe is a French legislative constituency in the Sarthe département.

== Historic representation ==
Election	Member	Party
1988	Jean-Claude Boulard	PS
1993	Pierre Gascher	RPR
1997	Jean-Claude Boulard	PS
2002	Dominique Le Mener	UMP
2007	Dominique Le Mener	UMP
2012	Dominique Le Mener	UMP
2017	Jean-Carles Grelier	LR
2017	Jean-Carles Grelier	SL
2022	Jean-Carles Grelier	DVD

== Election results ==
=== 2024 ===
Candidate	Party	Alliance	First round		Second round	
Candidate	Party	Alliance	Votes	%	Votes	%
Jean-Carles Grelier	REN	Ensemble	17,898	31.28	32,006	57.04
Pierre Vaugarny	RN		21,870	38.23	24,102	42.96
Christophe Rouillon	PS	NFP	15,261	26.67		
Cécile Bayle de Jessé	DLF	DSV	1,285	2.25		
Karine Fouquet	LO		899	1.57		
Valid votes			57,213	96.84	56,108	94.82
Blank votes			1,367	2.31	2,443	4.13
Null votes			500	0.85	620	1.05
Turnout			59,080	67.15	59,171	67.24
Abstentions			28,900	32.85	28,833	32.76
Registered voters			87,980		88,004	
Result			REN HOLD			

=== 2022 ===
Legislative Election 2022: Sarthe's 5th constituency
Party	Candidate	Votes	%	±%
DVD (Ensemble)	Jean-Carles Grelier	13,267	33.73	+2.05
RN	Victoria De Vigneral	8,944	22.74	+10.02
LFI (NUPÉS)	Rabbi Kokolo	7,768	19.75	−0.46
PS	Frédéric Lunel*	3,667	9.32	N/A
LR (UDC)	Noa Lerosier	1,619	4.12	−23.12
REC	Eric De Vilmarest	1,455	3.70	N/A
DLF (UPF)	Cécile Bayle De Jesse	1,083	2.75	+0.45
Others	N/A	1,530	3.89	
Turnout		39,333	46.41	−3.13
2nd round result
DVD (Ensemble)	Jean-Carles Grelier	21,174	59.51	+12.24
RN	Victoria De Vigneral	14,404	40.49	N/A
Turnout		35,578	44.92	+6.10
DVD gain from LR				

* PS dissident without the support of the NUPES alliance

=== 2017 ===
Legislative Election 2017: Sarthe's 5th constituency
Party	Candidate	Votes	%	±%
LREM	Willy Colin	13,645	31.68	
LR	Jean-Carles Grelier	11,731	27.24	
FN	Eric De Vilmarest	5,478	12.72	
LFI	Luc-Marie Faburel	5,039	11.70	
EELV	Sophie Bringuy	2,107	4.89	
PS	Samuel Cadeau	1,560	3.62	
DLF	Cécile Bayle De Jesse	989	2.30	
Others	N/A	2,520		
Turnout		43,069	49.54	
2nd round result
LR	Jean-Carles Grelier	17,795	52.73	
LREM	Willy Colin	15,951	47.27	
Turnout		33,746	38.82	
LR hold				

=== 2012 ===
Legislative Election 2012: Sarthe's 5th constituency
Party	Candidate	Votes	%	±%
UMP	Dominique Le Mèner	20,491	39.64	
PS	Christophe Rouillon	19,959	38.61	
FN	Marie-Claude Deotto	5,750	11.12	
FG	Luc-Marie Faburel	2,474	4.79	
EELV	Elen Debost	1,636	3.16	
Others	N/A	1,388		
Turnout		51,698	59.10	
2nd round result
UMP	Dominique Le Mèner	25,581	50.16	
PS	Christophe Rouillon	25,420	49.84	
Turnout		51,001	58.32	
UMP hold				

=== 2007 ===
Legislative Election 2007: Sarthe 5th - 2nd round
Party	Candidate	Votes	%	±%
UMP	Dominique Le Mèner	27,754	55.11	
PS	Christophe Rouillon	22,606	44.89	
Turnout		51,689	59.55	
UMP hold		Swing		

== Sources and references ==
- Official results of French elections from 1998: "Résultats électoraux officiels en France" (in French).
