= Marietta Karamanli =

French politician (born 1964)

Member of the National Assembly for Sarthe's 2nd constituency
- Incumbent
- Assumed office 20 June 2007
- Preceded by: Jean-Marie Geveaux

Member of the Municipal council of Le Mans
- Incumbent
- Assumed office 24 March 1989
- Mayor: Robert Jarry; Jean-Claude Boulard; Stéphane Le Foll

Personal details
- Born: 18 December 1964 (age 61) Athens, Greece

Marietta Karamanli (Greek: Μαριέττα Καραμανλή, born 18 December 1964 in Athens) is a French politician who has been a member of the National Assembly of France since 2007, representing the Sarthe department. Excluded from the Socialist Party, she joined the NUPES coalition in April 2022.

== Political career ==
In parliament, Karamanli serves on the Committee on Legal Affairs. In November 2018, she co-authored (with Éric Bothorel) a parliamentary report on digital taxation.

In addition to her role in parliament, Karamanli has been serving as member of the French delegation to the Parliamentary Assembly of the Council of Europe (PACE) since 2007. She is a member of the Committee on the Honouring of Obligations and Commitments by Member States of the Council of Europe (Monitoring Committee) and the Sub-Committee on External Relations. In this capacity, she has served as the Assembly's rapporteur on the access by detainees to a lawyer (2017) and on the protection provided to victims of terrorism (since 2019).

From 2014 until 2016, Karamanli served as General Rapporteur of the Parliamentary Assembly of the Council of Europe on the Abolition of the death penalty. In that role, she publicly condemned plans of the Russian State Duma to introduce capital punishment for certain crimes relating to terrorism in March 2015.

Ahead of the 2020 French municipal elections, Karamanli ran against the outgoing mayor Stéphane Le Foll, the official PS candidate. As a consequence, Karamanli's membership in the Socialist Party was suspended for a year.

== Political positions ==
In July 2019, Karamanli voted against the French ratification of the European Union’s Comprehensive Economic and Trade Agreement (CETA) with Canada.
