= Pascale Fontenel-Personne =

French politician

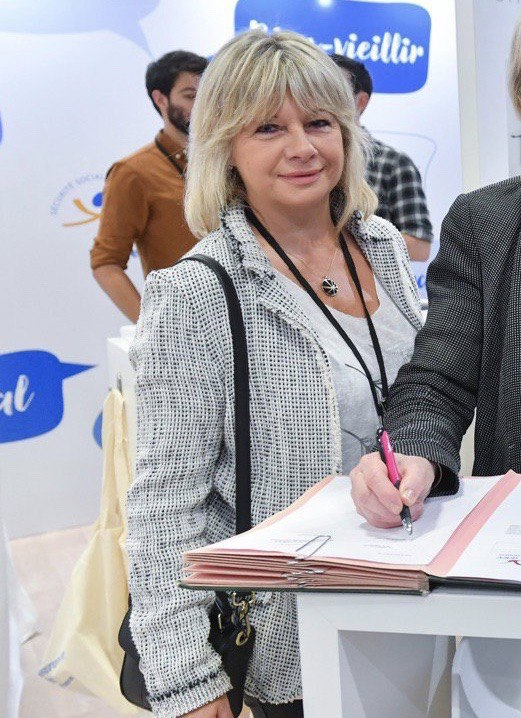

Member of the National Assembly for Sarthe's 3rd constituency
- In office 21 June 2017 – 21 June 2022
- Preceded by: Guy-Michel Chauveau
- Succeeded by: Eric Martineau

Personal details
- Born: 26 May 1962 (age 63) Le Mans, France
- Party: La République En Marche! (2017-2019)
- Children: Julie Delpech

Pascale Fontenel-Personne (French pronunciation: [paskal fɔ̃tnɛl pɛʁsɔn]; born 26 May 1962) is a French politician who has been serving as a member of the French National Assembly since 2017 to 2022, representing the department of Sarthe. From 2017 until 2019, she was a member of La République En Marche! (LREM).

== Political career ==
Fontenel-Personne was elected in Sarthe's 3rd constituency at the 2017 legislative election.

In parliament, Fontenel-Personne served as member of the Defense Committee. In addition to her committee assignments, she was a member of the French-Montenegrin Parliamentary Friendship Group. From 2019, she was also a member of the French delegation to the Franco-German Parliamentary Assembly.

In July 2019, Fontenel-Personne decided not to align with her parliamentary group's majority and became of 52 LREM members who abstained from a vote on the French ratification of the European Union’s Comprehensive Economic and Trade Agreement (CETA) with Canada.

In late 2019, Fontenel-Personne was one of 17 members of the Defense Committee who co-signed a letter to Prime Minister Édouard Philippe in which they warned that the 365 million euro ($406 million) sale of aerospace firm Groupe Latécoère to U.S. fund Searchlight Capital raised “questions about the preservation of know-how and France’s defense industry base” and urged government intervention.

She retired at the 2022 French legislative election. Her daughter Julie Delpech was elected MP for Sarthe's 1st constituency.

== See also ==
- 2017 French legislative election
