= Sarthe's 2nd constituency =

Constituency of the National Assembly of France

2nd constituency of the Sarthe
- inline Constituency of the National Assembly of France

- The constituency in Sarthe
- Deputy: Marietta Karamanli; PS
- Department: Sarthe
- Cantons: Bouloire, Le Mans-Est-Campagne, Le Mans-Sud-Est, Le Mans-Sud-Ouest, Le Mans-Ville-Est, Montfort-le-Gesnois
- Registered voters: 118,052

The 2nd constituency of the Sarthe is a French legislative constituency in the Sarthe département.

== Geography ==
The constituency is based in the centre of the department, containing most of the city of Le Mans.

== Deputies ==
Election	Member	Party
1958	Fernand Poignant	Ind. Soc.
1962	Robert Manceau	PCF
1967	Robert Manceau	PCF
1968	Jacques Chaumont	UDR
1973	Jacques Chaumont	UDR
1978	Daniel Boulay	PCF
1981	Raymond Douyère	PS
1986	Proportional representation – no election by constituency	
1988	Raymond Douyère	PS
1993	Jean-Marie Geveaux	RPR
1997	Raymond Douyère	PS
2000 (By-election)	Jean-Marie Geveaux	RPR
2002	Jean-Marie Geveaux	UMP
2007	Marietta Karamanli	PS
2012	Marietta Karamanli	PS
2017	Marietta Karamanli	PS
2022	Marietta Karamanli	PS

== Election results ==
=== 2024 ===
Candidate	Party	Alliance	First round		Second round	
Candidate	Party	Alliance	Votes	%	Votes	%
Marietta Karamanli	PS	NFP	20,700	39.95	28,660	57.31
François Fèvre	LR	UXD	18,282	35.29	21,349	42.69
Samuel Chevallier	UDI	Ensemble	11,962	23.09		
Clément Cheuret	Ind		91	0.18		
Thomas Hubert	LO		776	1.50		
Valid votes			51,811	96.58	50,009	92.97
Blank votes			1,510	2.81	3,221	5.99
Null votes			322	0.60	563	1.05
Turnout			53,643	64.04	53,793	64.21
Abstentions			30,121	35.96	29 86	5.79
Registered voters			83,764		83,779	
Result			PS HOLD			

=== 2022 ===
Legislative Election 2022: Sarthe's 2nd constituency
Party	Candidate	Votes	%	±%
PS (NUPÉS)	Marietta Karamanli	12,668	36.53	-2.77
RN	Angéline Furet	7,261	20.94	+7.84
HOR (Ensemble)	Alexandra Monet	6,517	18.79	−7.02
LR (UDC)	François Le Forestier	2,985	8.61	−7.34
PS	Muriel Cabaret*	2,323	6.70	N/A
REC	Olivier Beslier	987	2.85	N/A
DVE	Marylin Zbirou	874	2.52	N/A
Others	N/A	1,061	6.70	
Turnout		34,676	42.85	−4.49
2nd round result
PS (NUPÉS)	Marietta Karamanli	20,399	63.06	+1.18
RN	Angéline Furet	11,952	36.94	N/A
Turnout		32,351	43.18	+7.32
PS hold				

* PS dissident without the support of the NUPES alliance

=== 2017 ===
Legislative Election 2017: Sarthe's 2nd constituency
Party	Candidate	Votes	%	±%
LREM	Aurélie Perot	10,021	25.81	
PS	Marietta Karamanli	9,355	24.10	
UDI	Samuel Chevallier	6,191	15.95	
FN	Pascal Nicot	5,086	13.10	
LFI	Matthias Tavel	4,735	12.20	
EELV	Elisabeth Sesma	1,164	3.00	
Others	N/A	2,270		
Turnout		38,822	47.34	
2nd round result
PS	Marietta Karamanli	18,192	61.88	
LREM	Aurélie Perot	11,208	38.12	
Turnout		29,400	35.86	
PS hold				

=== 2012 ===
Legislative Election 2012: Sarthe's 2nd constituency
Party	Candidate	Votes	%	±%
PS	Marietta Karamanli	22,024	48.15	
UMP	Philippe Metivier	10,966	23.97	
FN	Marie D'Herbais	6,182	13.52	
FG	Pascale Soulard	2,538	5.55	
EELV	Rémy Batiot	1,277	2.79	
Others	N/A	2,753		
Turnout		45,740	54.88	
2nd round result
PS	Marietta Karamanli	27,506	64.53	
UMP	Philippe Metivier	15,121	35.47	
Turnout		42,627	51.15	
PS hold				

=== 2007 ===
Legislative Election 2007: Sarthe's 2nd constituency
Party	Candidate	Votes	%	±%
UMP	Jean-Marie Geveaux	19,986	42.93	+0.43
PS	Marietta Karamanli	15,965	34.29	+3.84
MoDem	Pascaline Treton	2,526	5.43	+5.43
PCF	Pascale Soulard	1,661	3.57	+1.08
FN	Joël Métivier	1,596	3.43	−3.22
Others	N/A	4,826	10.37	
Turnout		82,212	41.73	
2nd round result
PS	Marietta Karamanli	23,476	52.48	+4.63
UMP	Jean-Marie Geveaux	21,261	47.52	−4.63
Turnout		82,209	55.91	
PS gain from UMP				

=== 2002 ===
Legislative Election 2002: Sarthe's 2nd constituency
Party	Candidate	Votes	%	±%
UMP	Jean-Marie Geveaux	20,163	42.50	+5.19
PS	Géraud Guibert	14,445	30.45	+4.41
FN	Pierre-Jean Bodiger	3,631	7.65	+2.20
PCF	Jean-Claude Laude	2,206	4.65	−3.98
Others	N/A	7,001	14.75	
Turnout		48, 758	61.34	
2nd round result
UMP	Jean-Marie Geveaux	22,389	52.15	+0.68
PS	Géraud Guibert	20,546	47.85	−0.68
Turnout		44,340	55.78	
UMP hold				

=== 2000 by-election ===
The Deputy for this seat, Raymond Douyère resigned on 31 December 1999, after being appointed to the Monetary Policy Council of the Bank of France. A by-election was subsequently called for the following March to fill the vacancy.

2000 by-election: Sarthe's 2nd constituency
Party	Candidate	Votes	%	±%
RPR	Jean-Marie Geveaux	11,223	37.31	+9.08
PS	Géraud Guibert	7,834	26.04	−3.04
PCF	Jean-Claude Laude	2,597	8.63	−1.27
LV	Sylvie Granger	2,269	7.54	+4.46
DVG	Claude Picault	1,812	6.02	N/A
FN	Pierre-Jean Bodiger	3,631	5.45	−6.17
Others	N/A	2,679	9.01	
Turnout		31,924	40.16	
2nd round result
RPR	Jean-Marie Geveaux	16,881	51.47	+9.94
PS	Géraud Guibert	15,914	48.53	−9.94
Turnout		34,743	43.71	
RPR gain from PS				

=== 1997 ===
Legislative Election 1997: Sarthe's 2nd constituency
Party	Candidate	Votes	%	±%
PS	Raymond Douyère	14,873	29.80	+13.29
RPR	Jean-Marie Geveaux	14,090	28.23	+2.21
FN	Charles Met	5,779	11.62	+2.50
PCF	Christian Martin	4,994	10.00	−1.53
DVG	Phillipe Goude	3,167	6.34	−4.13
Others	N/A	6,993	14.01	
Turnout		52,842	66.77	
2nd round result
PS	Raymond Douyère	30,638	58.47	+10.60
RPR	Jean-Marie Geveaux	21,761	41.53	−10.60
Turnout		55,578	70.24	
PS gain from RPR				

=== 1993 ===
Legislative Election 1993: Sarthe's 2nd constituency
Party	Candidate	Votes	%	±%
RPR	Jean-Marie Geveaux	12,694	26.02	N/A
PS	Raymond Douyère	8,056	16.51	−26.98
UDF	Patric Piard	5,762	11.81	−13.66
PCF	Daniel Boulay	5,626	11.53	−12.63
DVG	Phillipe Goude	5,131	10.52	N/A
FN	Charles Met	4,451	9.12	+3.28
Others	N/A	7,065	14.48	
Turnout		52,623	66.33	
2nd round result
RPR	Jean-Marie Geveaux	24,994	52.23	N/A
PS	Raymond Douyère	22,863	47.77	−17.68
Turnout		52,068	65.64	
RPR gain from PS				

=== 1988 ===
Legislative Election 1988: Sarthe's 2nd constituency
Party	Candidate	Votes	%	±%
PS	Raymond Douyère	20,441	43.49	N/A
UDF	Jean Daunay	11,970	25.47	N/A
PCF	Daniel Boulay (Note: Achieved a high enough vote share to proceed to the second round but withdrew beforehand)	11,357	24.16	N/A
FN	Josette Vigoureux-Marchand	2,747	5.84	N/A
Others	N/A	490	1.04	
Turnout		48,245	62.95	
2nd round result
PS	Raymond Douyère	30,753	65.45	N/A
UDF	Jean Daunay	16,234	34.55	N/A
Turnout		48,932	63.86	
PS win (new seat)				

== Sources ==
- "Résultats électoraux officiels en France" (in French). 2017.
- French Interior Ministry results website: "Résultats électoraux officiels en France" (in French).
