= Sarthe's 3rd constituency =

Constituency of the National Assembly of France

3rd constituency of the Sarthe
- inline Constituency of the National Assembly of France

- The constituency in Sarthe
- Deputy: Eric Martineau; MoDem
- Department: Sarthe
- Cantons: La Chartre-sur-le-Loir, Château-du-Loir, Écommoy, La Flèche, Le Grand-Lucé, Le Lude, Mayet, Pontvallain, Saint-Calais
- Registered voters: 118,177

The 3rd constituency of the Sarthe is a French legislative constituency in the Sarthe département. It has been represented by MP Eric Martineau since 2022.

== Geography ==
The constituency covers the southern areas of the department.

== Deputies ==
Election	Member	Party
1988	Guy-Michel Chauveau	PS
1993	Antoine Joly	RPR
1997	Guy-Michel Chauveau	PS
2002	Béatrice Pavy	UMP
2007	Béatrice Pavy	UMP
2012	Guy-Michel Chauveau	DVG
2017	Pascale Fontenel-Personne	LREM
2022	Eric Martineau	MoDem

== Election results ==
=== 2024 ===
Candidate	Party	Alliance	First round		Second round	
Candidate	Party	Alliance	Votes	%	Votes	%
Éric Martineau	MoDEM	Ensemble	16,209	29.17	28,392	51.44
Romain Lemoigne	RN		23,637	42.54	26,799	48.56
Mathilde Jack	LFI	NFP	10,319	18.57		
Vincent Gruau	REN		2,819	5.07		
Raymond De Malherbe	RN!		1,131	2.04		
Eric Mercier	DLF	DSV	558	1.00		
Yann Le Diagon	LO		885	1.59		
Valid votes			55,558	96.58	55,191	95.10
Blank votes			1,318	2.29	1,981	3.41
Null votes			647	1.12	860	1.48
Turnout			57,523	66.98	58,032	67.56
Abstentions			28,355	33,02	27,862	32,44
Registered voters			85,878		85,894	
Source: [https://www.resultats-elections.interieur.gouv.fr/legislatives2024/ensemble_geographique/52/72/7203/index.html
Result			MoDEM HOLD			

=== 2022 ===
Legislative Election 2022: Sarthe's 3rd constituency
Party	Candidate	Votes	%	±%
RN	Bruno Pincon	10,570	27.34	+11.82
MoDem (Ensemble)	Eric Martineau	10,071	26.05	-6.05
LFI (NUPÉS)	Dominique Leloup	8,193	21.19	−3.13
LR (UDC)	Béatrice Latouche	4,439	11.48	−10.72
PS	Laurent Branchu*	2,362	6.11	N/A
REC	Bernadette Coudrain	1,347	3.48	N/A
LP (UPF)	Jérôme Poisson	828	2.14	N/A
Others	N/A	850	2.20	
Turnout		38,660	46.05	−2.96
2nd round result
MoDem (Ensemble)	Eric Martineau	18,394	50.97	-2.72
RN	Bruno Pincon	17,692	49.03	N/A
Turnout		36,086	46.00	+9.45
MoDem gain from LREM				

* PS dissident without the support of the NUPES alliance

=== 2017 ===
Legislative Election 2017: Sarthe's 3rd constituency
Party	Candidate	Votes	%	±%
LREM	Pascale Fontenel-Personne	13,408	32.10	
LR	Béatrice Pavy-Morancais	9,272	22.20	
FN	Pascal Gannat	6,483	15.52	
LFI	Barbara Fossaert	5,347	12.80	
PS	Nicolas Chauvin	3,566	8.54	
EELV	Dominique Trichet-Allaire	1,245	2.98	
Others	N/A	2,450		
Turnout		41,771	49.01	
2nd round result
LREM	Pascale Fontenel-Personne	16,730	53.69	
LR	Béatrice Pavy-Morancais	14,430	46.31	
Turnout		31,160	36.55	
LREM gain from DVG				

=== 2012 ===
Legislative Election 2012: Sarthe's 3rd constituency
Party	Candidate	Votes	%	±%
UMP	Béatrice Pavy-Morancais	16,807	33.60	
DVG	Guy-Michel Chauveau	14,536	29.06	
EELV	Thierry Pradier	7,717	15.43	
FN	Jean-Claude Barlemont	6,715	13.42	
FG	Sonia Hertz	2,037	4.07	
Others	N/A	2,213		
Turnout		50,025	58.96	
2nd round result
DVG	Guy-Michel Chauveau	25,641	52.44	
UMP	Béatrice Pavy-Morancais	23,256	47.56	
Turnout		48,897	57.63	
DVG gain from UMP				

=== 2007 ===
Legislative Election 2007: Sarthe 3rd - 2nd round
Party	Candidate	Votes	%	±%
UMP	Béatrice Pavy	26,595	55.16	
PS	Agnès Lorilleux	21,619	44.84	
Turnout		49,645	59.09	
UMP hold		Swing		

== Sources ==
- Official results of French elections from 1998: "Résultats électoraux officiels en France" (in French).
