= Angéline Furet =

French politician (born 1981)

Angéline Furet MEP
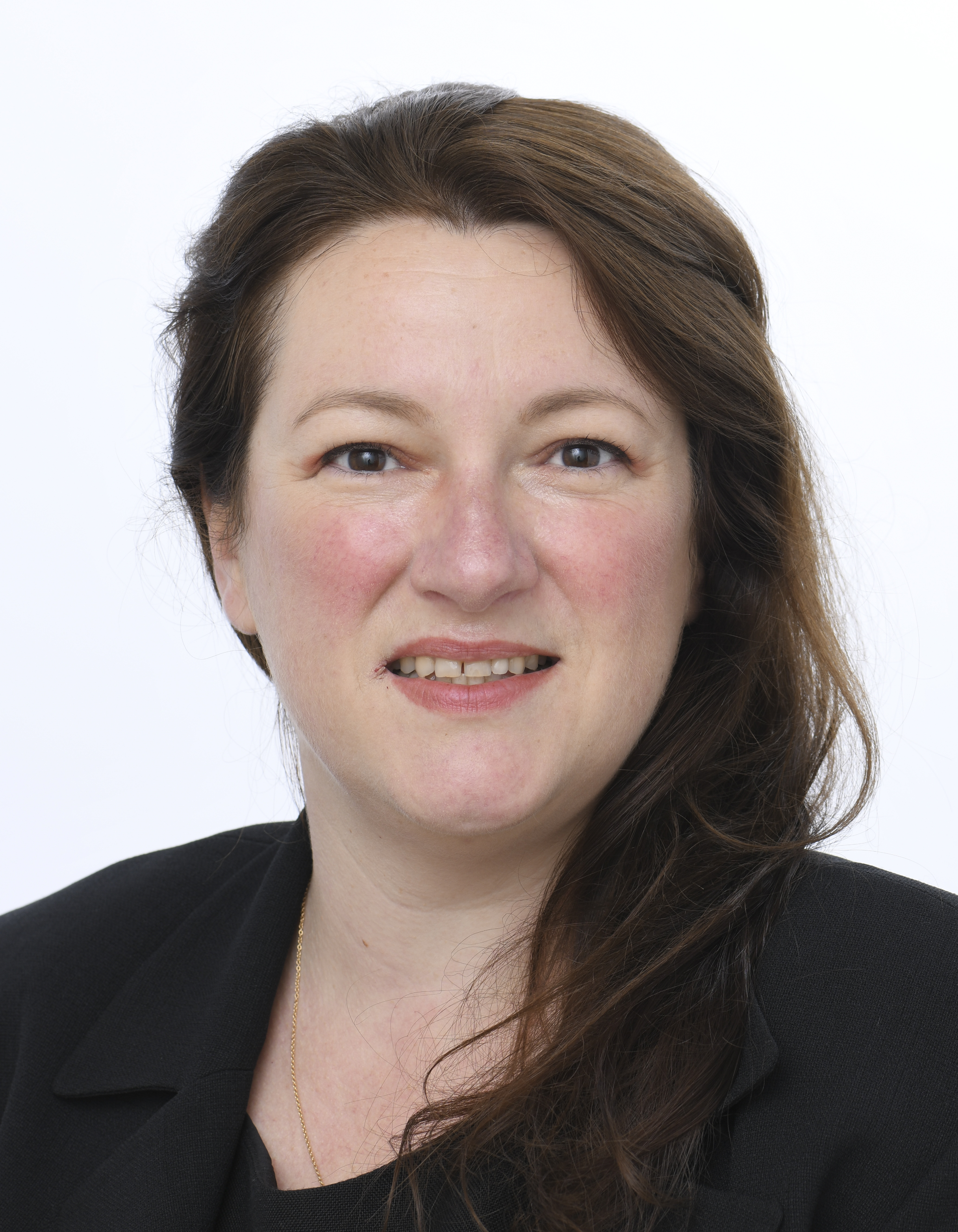

Member of the European Parliament for France
- Incumbent
- Assumed office 16 July 2024

Personal details
- Born: 24 July 1981 (age 45) Le Mans, France
- Party: National Rally
- Other political affiliations: Patriots for Europe
- Education: Prytanée national militaire University of Aix-en-Provence

Angéline Furet (born 24 July 1981) is a French politician of the National Rally who was elected member of the European Parliament in 2024.

== Early life and career ==
Furet was born in Le Mans and grew up in La Chapelle-Saint-Fray. She attended Prytanée national militaire and the University of Aix-en-Provence, where she graduated with a master's degree in law and political science. In 2013 she joined The Patriots, and later joined Debout la France and the National Rally. She was a candidate in the 2020 municipal elections in Le Mans, and ran for Sarthe's 2nd constituency in the 2022 legislative election. In the 2024 legislative election, she was the substitute of Republican candidate François Fèvre.
