= Béatrice Pavy-Morançais =

French politician

- Parliamentary group: UMP

Deputy for Sarthe's 3rd constituency in the National Assembly of France
- In office 2002–2012
- Preceded by: Guy-Michel Chauveau
- Succeeded by: Guy-Michel Chauveau

Personal details
- Born: 14 October 1958 (age 67)

Béatrice Pavy-Morançais (French pronunciation: [beatʁis pavi mɔʁɑ̃sɛ]; born 14 October 1958) is a French politician. She has been the vice-president of the Sarthe Departmental council, since 29 March 2015. She represented Sarthe's 3rd constituency in the National Assembly of France from 2002 to 2012 as a member of the Union for a Popular Movement.
