= Arrondissements of the Sarthe department =

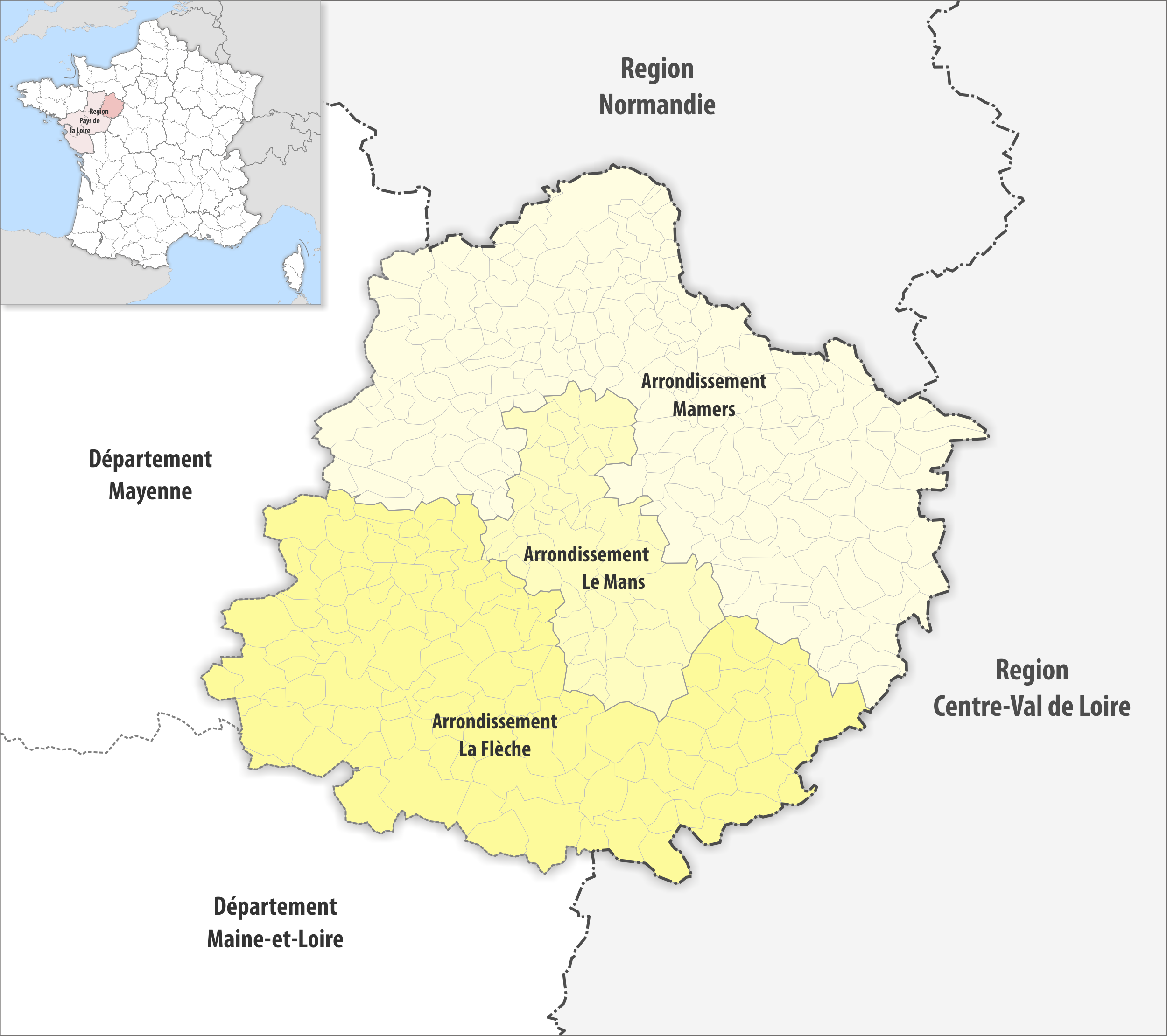
Map of arrondissements of the Sarthe department.

The 3 arrondissements of the Sarthe department are:

1. Arrondissement of La Flèche, (subprefecture: La Flèche) with 118 communes. The population of the arrondissement was 148,804 in 2021.
2. Arrondissement of Mamers, (subprefecture: Mamers) with 191 communes. The population of the arrondissement was 149,694 in 2021.
3. Arrondissement of Le Mans, (prefecture of the Sarthe department: Le Mans) with 45 communes. The population of the arrondissement was 267,560 in 2021.

== History ==
In 1800 the arrondissements of Le Mans, La Flèche, Mamers and Saint-Calais were established. The arrondissement of Saint-Calais was disbanded in 1926. In February 2006 the arrondissement of Le Mans lost the five cantons of La Chartre-sur-le-Loir, Château-du-Loir, Le Grand-Lucé, Loué and La Suze-sur-Sarthe to the arrondissement of La Flèche, and the six cantons of Bouloire, Conlie, Montfort-le-Gesnois, Saint-Calais, Sillé-le-Guillaume and Vibraye to the arrondissement of Mamers. In August 2012 the commune Champagné passed from the arrondissement of Mamers to the arrondissement of Le Mans, and the communes Beaufay, Courcemont and Savigné-l'Évêque passed from the arrondissement of Le Mans to the arrondissement of Mamers.
