= Dominique Le Mèner =

French politician

President of the Sarthe Departmental Council
- Incumbent
- Assumed office 2 April 2015
- Preceded by: Jean-Marie Geveaux

Deputy for Sarthe's 5th constituency in the National Assembly of France
- In office 19 June 2002 – 20 June 2017
- Preceded by: Jean-Claude Boulard
- Succeeded by: Jean-Carles Grelier
- Parliamentary group: UMP (2002 - 2015); LR (2015-2017)

Personal details
- Born: 12 November 1958 (age 67) Le Mans
- Party: The Republicans (2015–present)
- Other political affiliations: Union for a Popular Movement (2002–2015)

Dominique Le Mèner (born 12 November 1958) is a French politician. He has been the president of the Sarthe departmental council since 2 April 2015. He was a member of the National Assembly of France, representing Sarthe's 5th constituency from 2002 to 2017, as a member of the Union for a Popular Movement, then The Republicans.
