= Jean-Claude Antonini =

French politician (1940–2019)

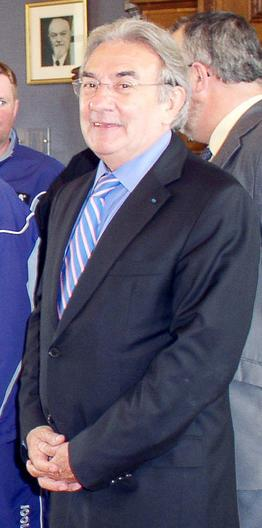
- Photo of Jean Claude Antonini

Mayor of Angers
- In office 1998–2012
- Preceded by: Jean Monnier
- Succeeded by: Frédéric Béatse

Personal details
- Born: 20 March 1940 Reims, France
- Died: 8 February 2019 (aged 78) Angers, France
- Party: Socialist Party
- Education: Sciences Po; University of Angers

Jean-Claude Antonini (20 March 1940 – 8 February 2019) was a French politician who served as mayor of Angers between 1998 and 2012. He died from cancer on 8 February 2019 at the age of 78.
