= Sarthe =

Department of France

- Department
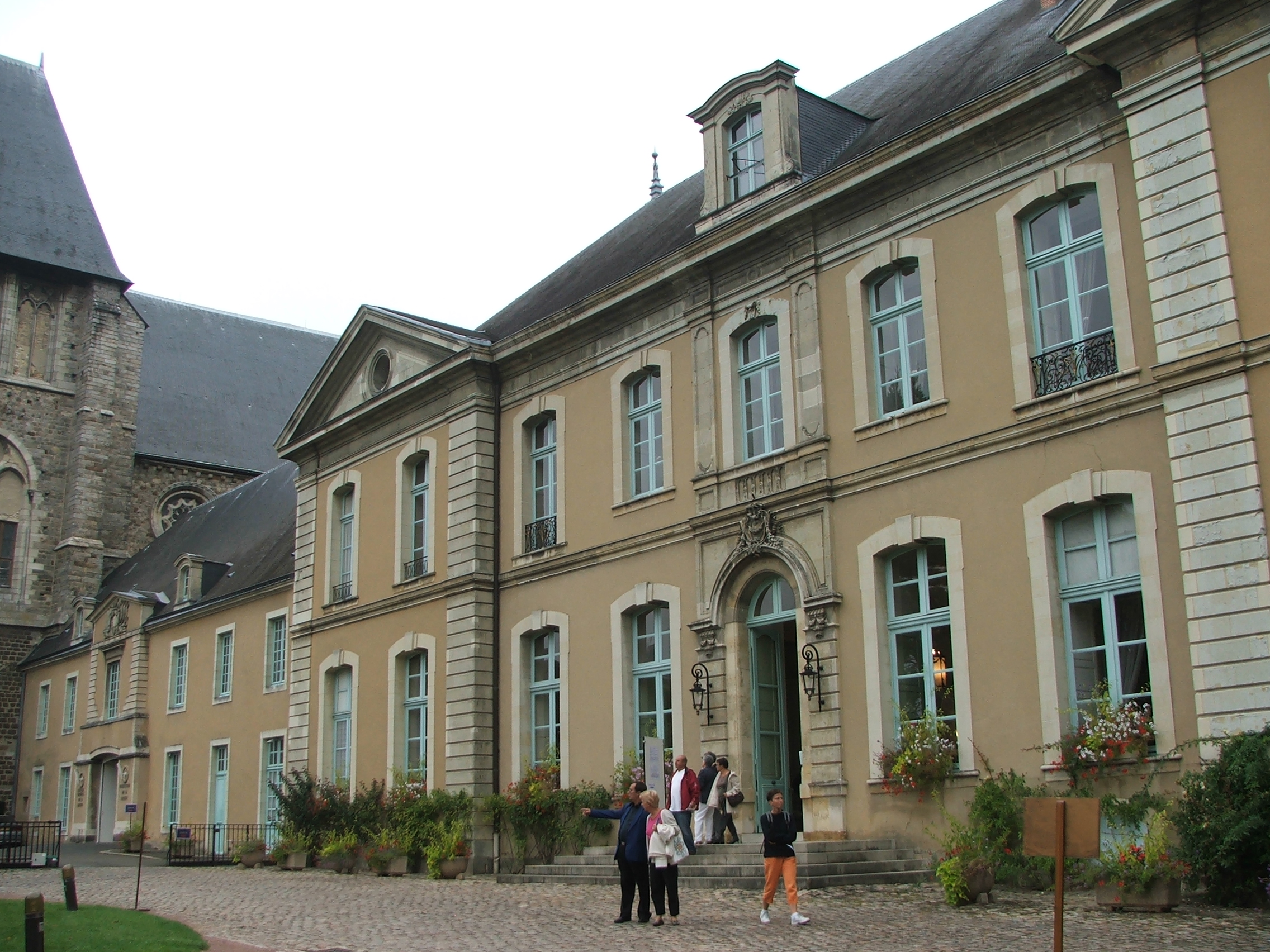
- Prefecture building of the Sarthe department, in Le Mans

- Coat of arms

- Location of Sarthe in France
- Coordinates: 48°17′N 0°13′E
- Country: France
- Region: Pays de la Loire
- Prefecture: Le Mans
- Subprefectures: La Flèche; Mamers

Government
  - President of the Departmental Council: Dominique Le Mèner

Area^{1}
  - Total: 6,206 km^{2} (2,396 sq mi)

Population (2023)
  - Total: 566,733
  - Rank: 46th
  - Density: 91.32/km^{2} (236.5/sq mi)
- Time zone: UTC+1 (CET)
  - Summer (DST): UTC+2 (CEST)
- ISO 3166 code: FR-72
- Department number: 72
- Arrondissements: 3
- Cantons: 21
- Communes: 352
- ^1 French Land Register data, which exclude estuaries, and lakes, ponds, and glaciers larger than 1 km^{2}

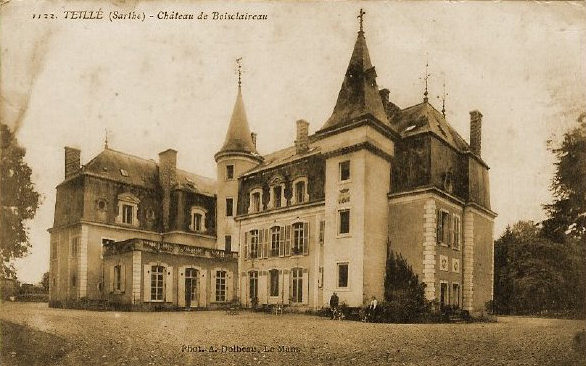
The Château de Boisclaireau, residence of the Gueroust family, Counts of Boisclaireau, in Sarthe.

Sarthe (French pronunciation: [saʁt]) is a department of the French region of Pays de la Loire, and the province of Maine, situated in the Grand-Ouest of the country. It is named after the river Sarthe, which flows from east of Le Mans to just north of Angers. It had a population of 566,733 in 2023.

== History ==
In the late 18th century, before it was officially Sarthe, the nobility built their mansions and chateaux in this region, as an escape from Paris.

The department was created during the French Revolution on 4 March 1790, pursuant to the law of 22 December 1789, starting from a part of the province of Maine. The latter was divided into two departments, Sarthe to the east and Mayenne to the west.

In Roman times, this province contained the city of Mans, and many of its ruins are still standing. The Roman Thermal Bathhouse attracts many tourists, as does the Theater of Aubigné-Racan, both located on the outskirts of Anjou, Maine, and Touraine.

Marin Mersenne, perhaps the most important scientific figure in the early 17th century, was born in the vicinity of Sarthe.

== Geography ==
The department of Sarthe is at the north end of the administrative region of Pays de la Loire. It is south of Normandy and on the southern edge of the Armorican Massif. It is bordered by the departments of Orne, Eure-et-Loir, Loir-et-Cher, Indre-et-Loire, Maine-et-Loire and Mayenne.

The arrival of the railways in 1854 boosted trade for the local economy. A TGV connection was constructed in 1989, connecting the community to high-speed transport. In terms of road connections, the A11 autoroute, which was constructed to Le Mans from the east in 1978, enhances Sarthe's strategic position as the gateway to the French west.

=== Principal towns ===
The most populous commune is Le Mans, the prefecture. Approximately 370,000 people, comprising 65% of the department's population, live in the Le Mans urban area. The rest of the department retains a rural character, with agriculture as the chief part of the economy. As of 2023, there are 6 communes with more than 8,000 inhabitants:

Commune	Population (2023)
Le Mans	146,249
La Flèche	14,947
Sablé-sur-Sarthe	12,326
Allonnes	10,739
La Ferté-Bernard	8,740
Coulaines	8,121

== Demographics ==
Population development since 1801:

Historical population

Year	Pop.	±% p.a.
1801	388,143	—
1806	410,380	+1.12%
1821	428,432	+0.29%
1831	457,372	+0.66%
1841	470,535	+0.28%
1851	473,071	+0.05%
1861	466,155	−0.15%
1872	446,603	−0.39%
1881	438,917	−0.19%
1891	429,737	−0.21%
1901	422,699	−0.16%
1911	419,370	−0.08%
1921	389,235	−0.74%
1931	384,619	−0.12%

Year	Pop.	±% p.a.
1936	388,519	+0.20%
1946	412,214	+0.59%
1954	420,393	+0.25%
1962	443,019	+0.66%
1968	461,839	+0.70%
1975	490,385	+0.86%
1982	504,768	+0.41%
1990	513,654	+0.22%
1999	529,851	+0.35%
2007	556,946	+0.63%
2012	567,382	+0.37%
2017	566,506	−0.03%
2023	566,733	+0.01%

== Politics ==
The department was the electoral base of former Prime Minister François Fillon, who since 2012 sits in the National Assembly of France for a constituency in central Paris. The president of the Departmental Council is Dominique Le Mèner, elected in 2015.

=== Presidential elections 2nd round ===
Election	Winning candidate	Party	%	2nd place candidate	Party	%
2022	Emmanuel Macron	LREM	55.41	Marine Le Pen	FN	44.59
2017	Emmanuel Macron	LREM	63.33	Marine Le Pen	FN	36.67
2012	François Hollande	PS	52.67	Nicolas Sarkozy	UMP	47.33
2007	Nicolas Sarkozy	UMP	50.42	Ségolène Royal	PS	49.58
2002	Jacques Chirac	RPR	84.43	Jean-Marie Le Pen	FN	15.57
1995	Lionel Jospin	PS	50.79	Jacques Chirac	RPR	49.21

=== Current National Assembly Representatives ===
Constituency	Member	Party
Sarthe's 1st constituency	Julie Delpech	Renaissance
Sarthe's 2nd constituency	Marietta Karamanli	Socialist Party
Sarthe's 3rd constituency	Éric Martineau	MoDem
Sarthe's 4th constituency	Élise Leboucher	La France Insoumise
Sarthe's 5th constituency	Jean-Carles Grelier	Renaissance

== Tourism ==
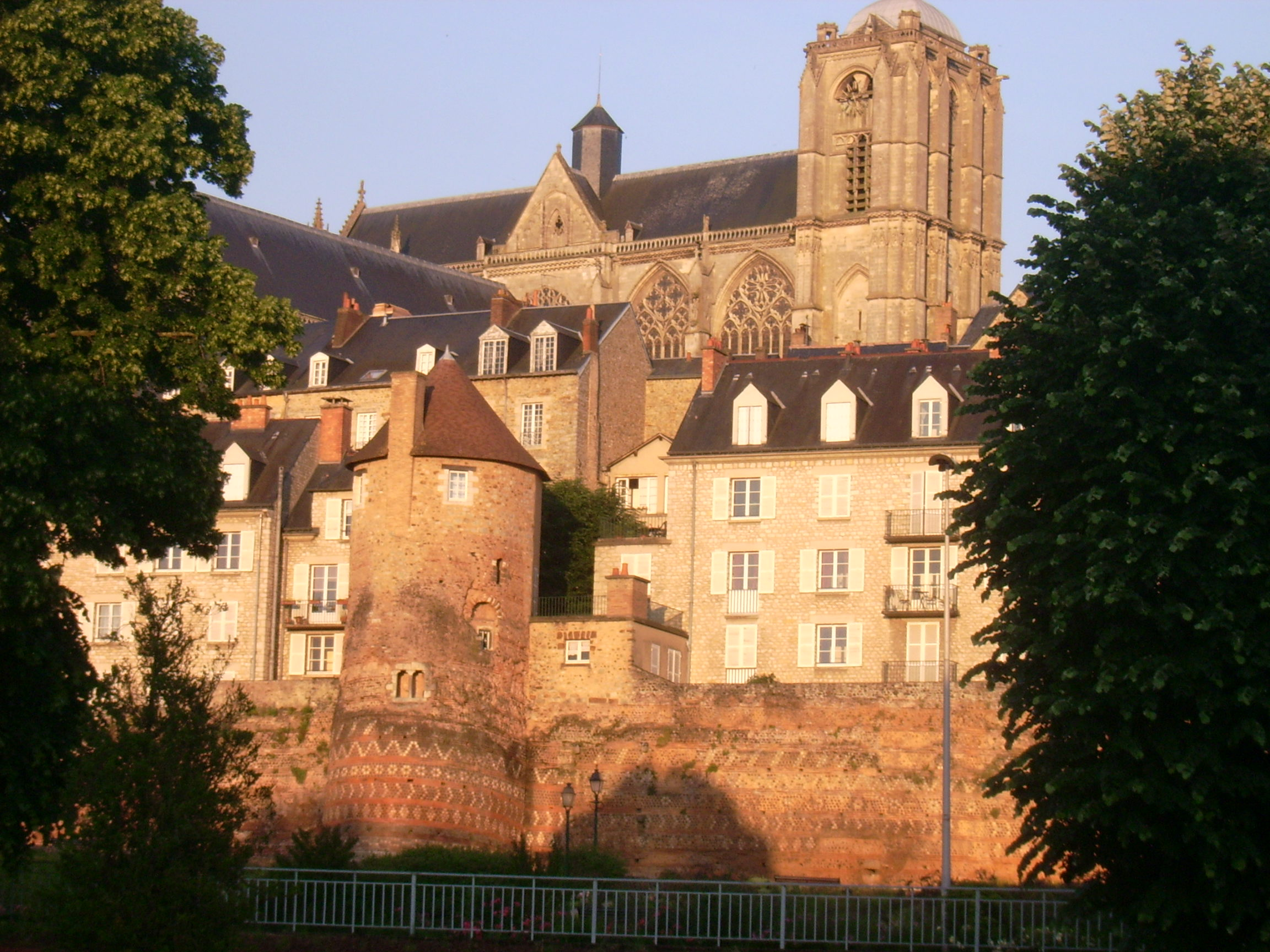
Gallo-Roman walls and Cathedral in Le Mans

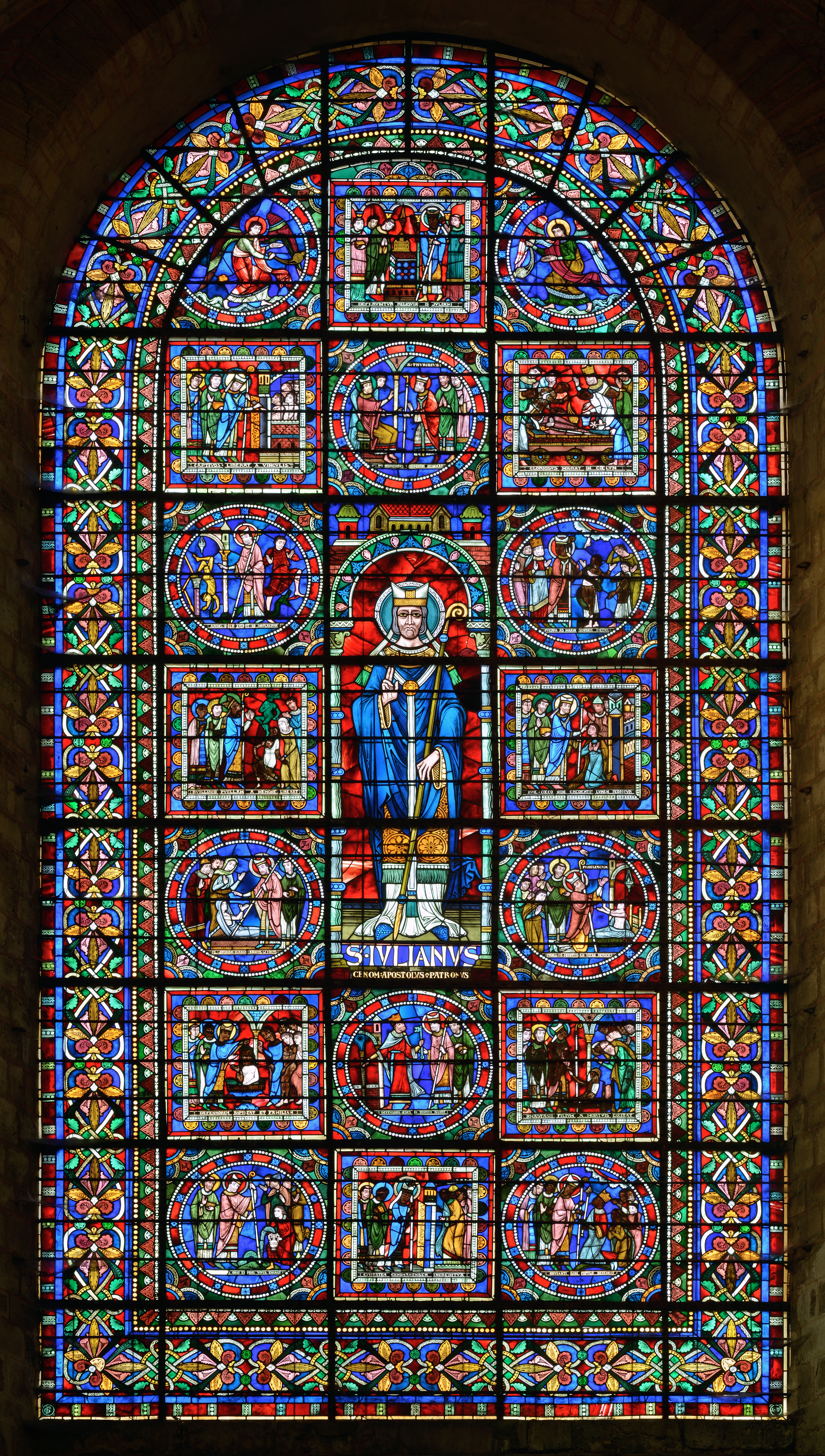
Stained glass in Le Mans Cathedral

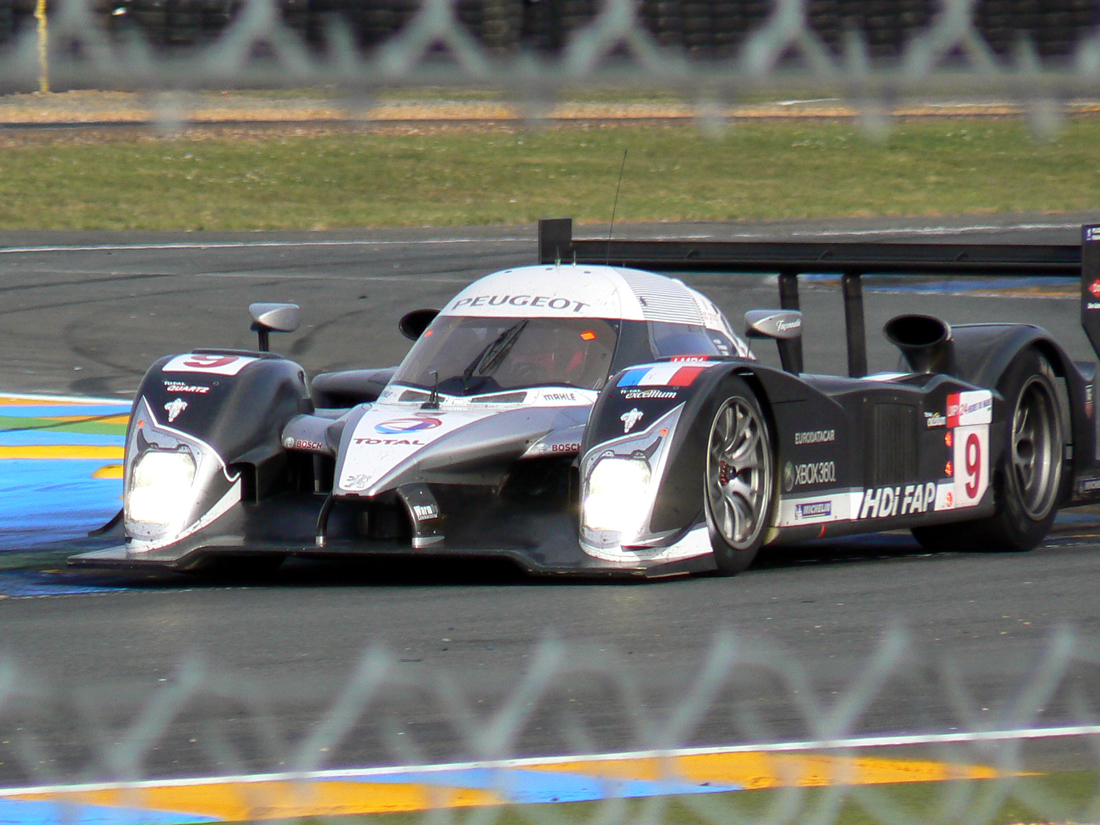
The 24 Hours of Le Mans is the world's oldest continuing sports car race in endurance racing.

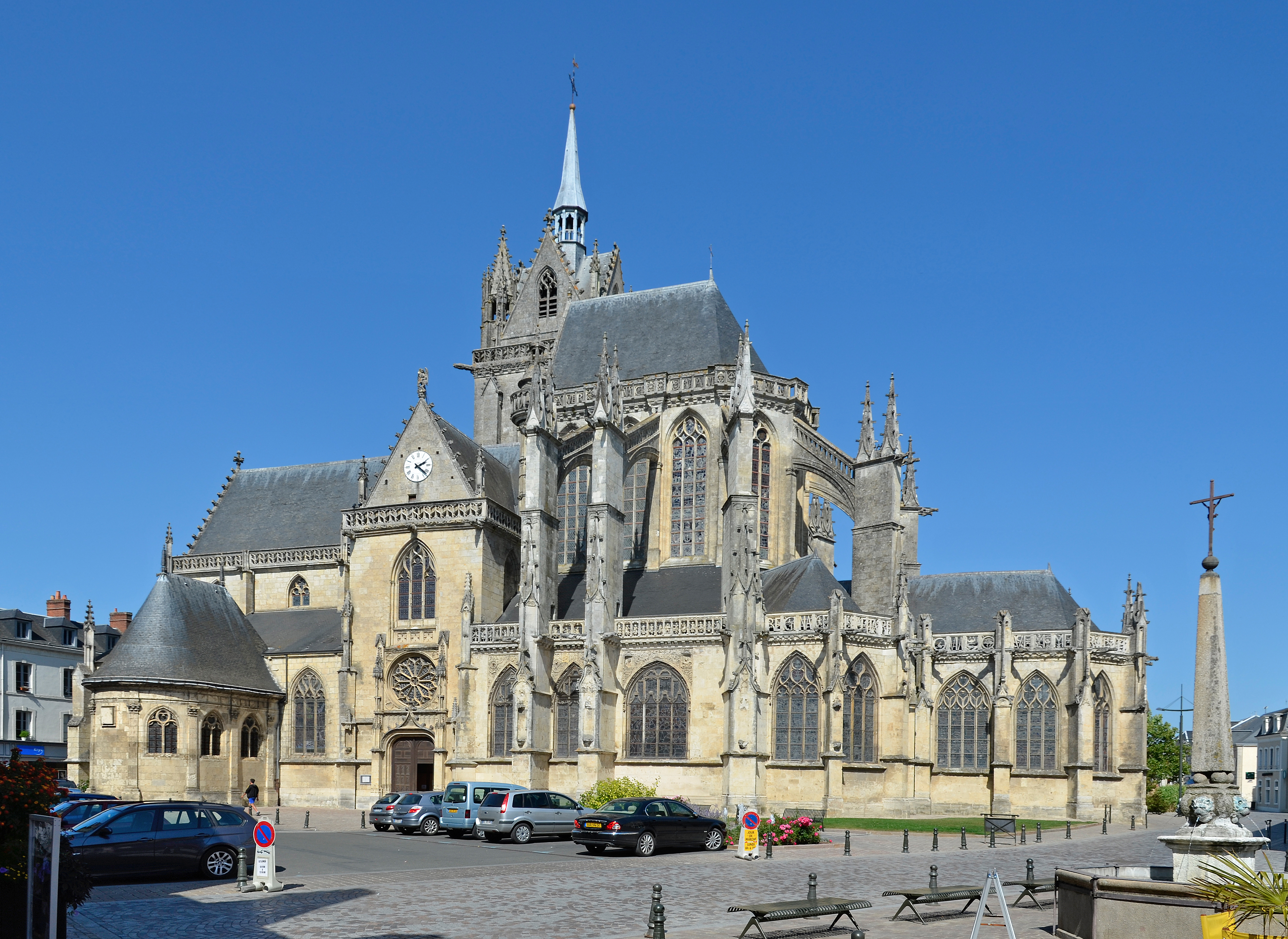
Church of La Ferté-Bernard

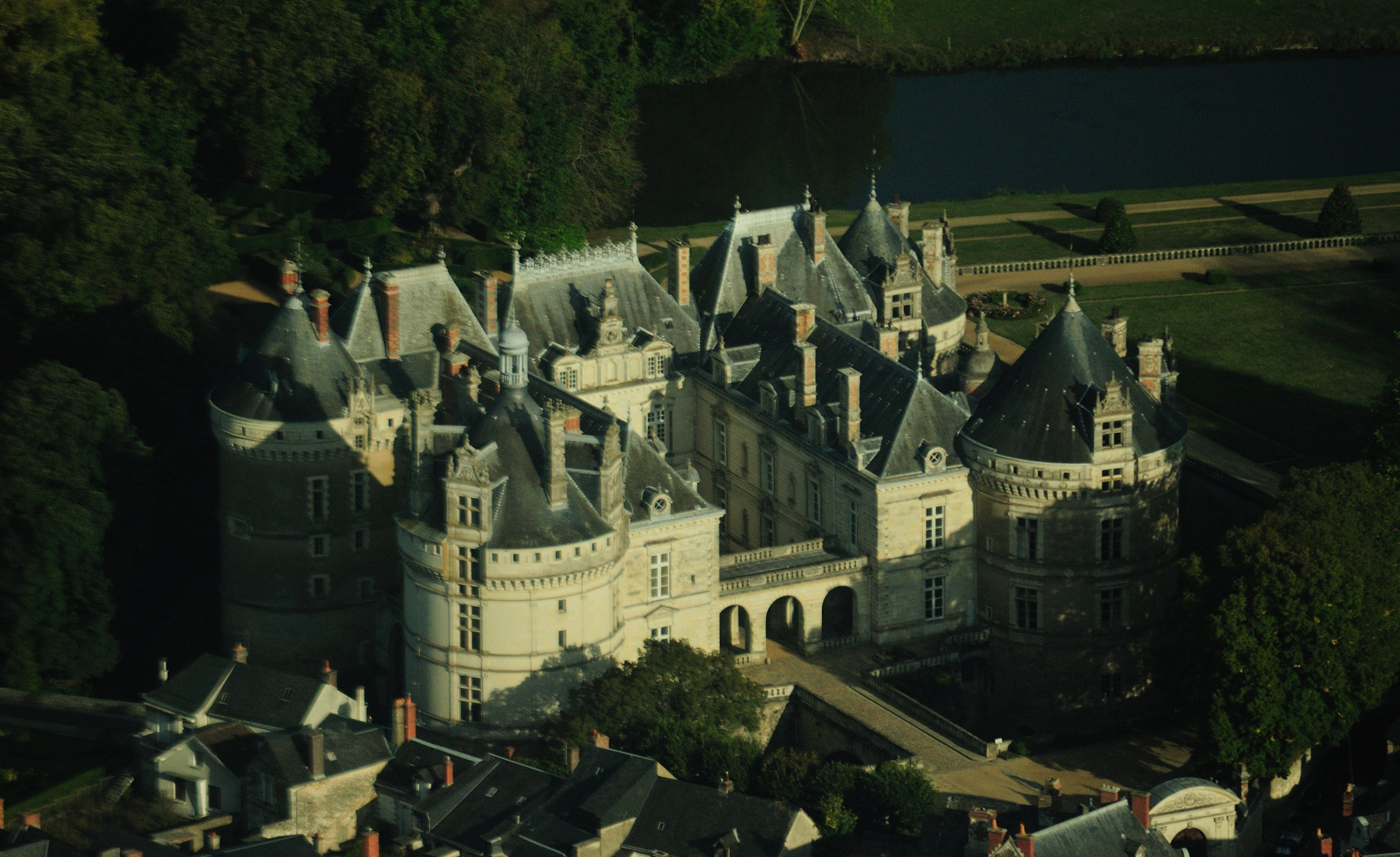
Château du Lude

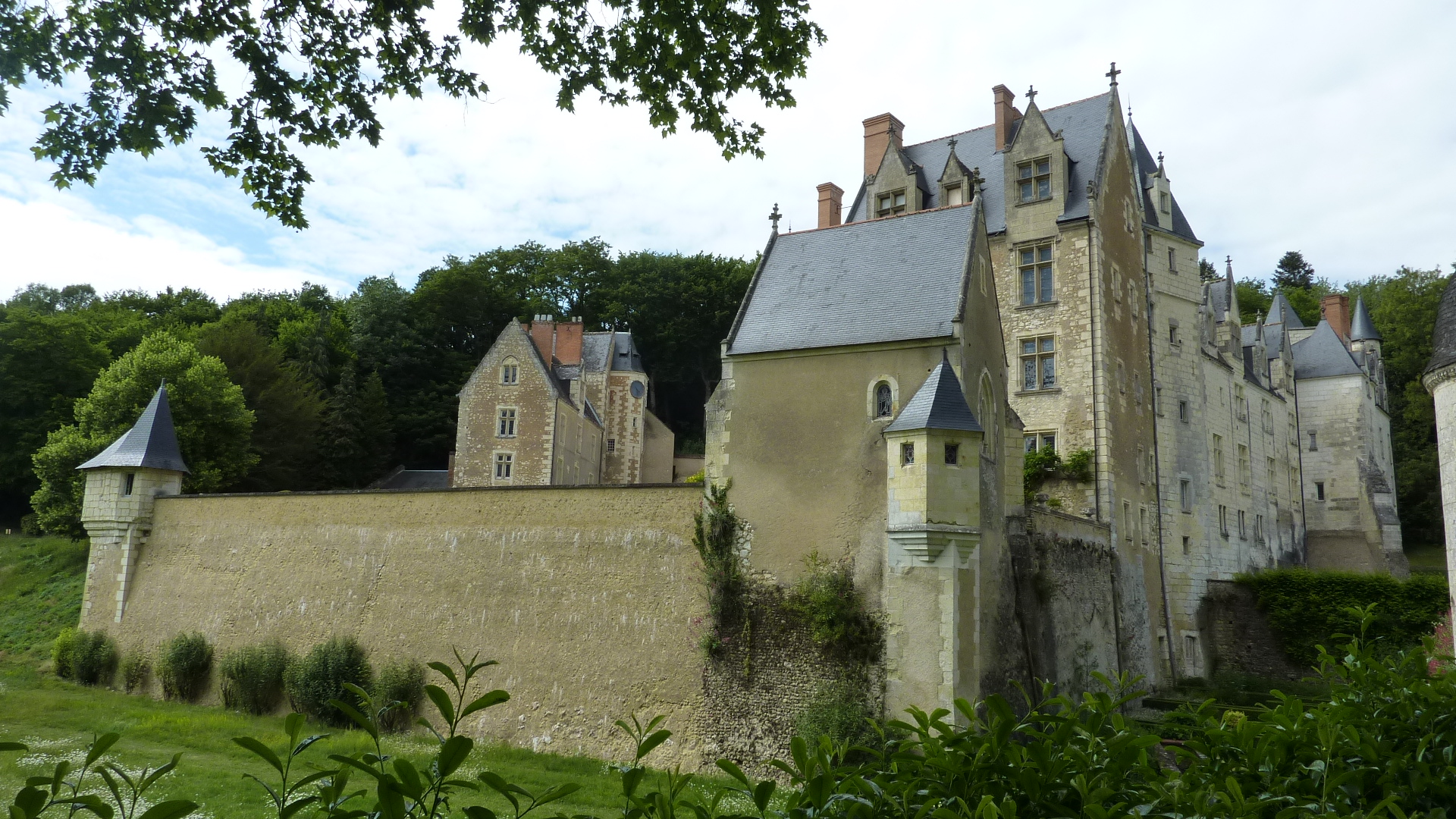
Château de Courtanvaux

== See also ==
- Arrondissements of the Sarthe department
- Cantons of the Sarthe department
- Circuit de la Sarthe (cycling), an annual road cycling race
- Circuit de la Sarthe, a motor racing track
- Communes of the Sarthe department
- History of Le Lude
- Gallo-Roman enclosure of Le Mans
