= Jean-Claude Boulard =

French politician (1943–2018)

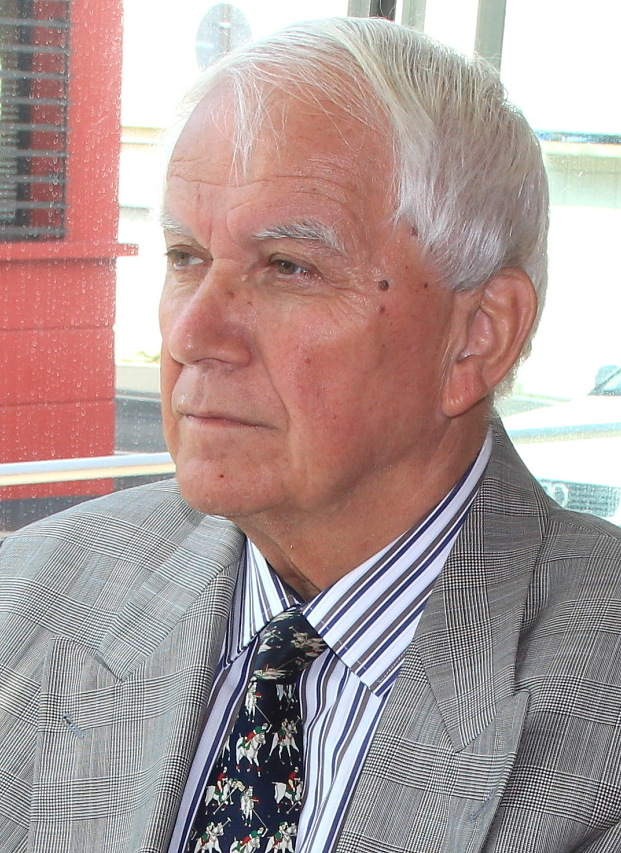
- Boulard in 2014

Mayor of Le Mans
- In office 24 March 2001 – 1 June 2018
- Preceded by: Robert Jarry
- Succeeded by: Isabelle Sévère

Senator for Sarthe
- In office 1 October 2014 – 1 October 2017
- Preceded by: Roland du Luart; Jean-Pierre Chauveau
- Succeeded by: Nadine Grelet-Certenais

Deputy for Sarthe
- In office 23 June 1988 – 1 April 1993
- Preceded by: proportional representation
- Succeeded by: Pierre Gascher
- In office 12 June 1997 – 18 June 2002
- Preceded by: Pierre Gascher
- Succeeded by: Dominique Le Mener

Personal details
- Born: 28 March 1943 Nantes, France
- Died: 1 June 2018 (aged 75) Le Mans, France
- Party: Socialist Party
- Education: Sciences Po

Jean-Claude Boulard (28 March 1943 – 1 June 2018) was a French politician. He was mayor of Le Mans from 2001 until his death, senator from 2014 to 2017, and deputy of National Assembly from 1988 to 1993 and again from 1997 to 2002.

== Early life ==
Born in Nantes on 28 March 1943, to artist Jean Boulard and his wife Marthe Savoyant-Boulard. His family moved to Saint-Marceau, Sarthe, and later Paris. Boulard graduated from Lycée Henri-IV and attended Sciences Po, where he studied sociology and ethnology.

== Political career ==
Boulard was first appointed to the Council of State in 1968. Boulard worked for the French Merchant Navy, then returned to the Council of State. His first political office was deputy mayor of Saint-Marceau. He was elected to the Sarthe departmental council in 1976, and became president of Le Mans Métropole in 1983, representing the Socialist Party–Radical Party of the Left coalition. Boulard won a seat on the National Assembly in 1988, but failed to win reelection in 1993. He returned to the Assembly in 1997, and served until 2002. Boulard supported minimum integration income during his first term, and was a proponent of universal health coverage in his second term. Boulard was first elected mayor of Le Mans in 2001. From 2014 to 2017, he sat on the Senate, representing Sarthe.

Boulard's wife Dominique served as mayor of Saint-Marceau.

== Death ==
Boulard fell ill in early 2018, remaining mayor of Le Mans until his death in the city on 1 June 2018, aged 75.
