= Jean-Carles Grelier =

French politician

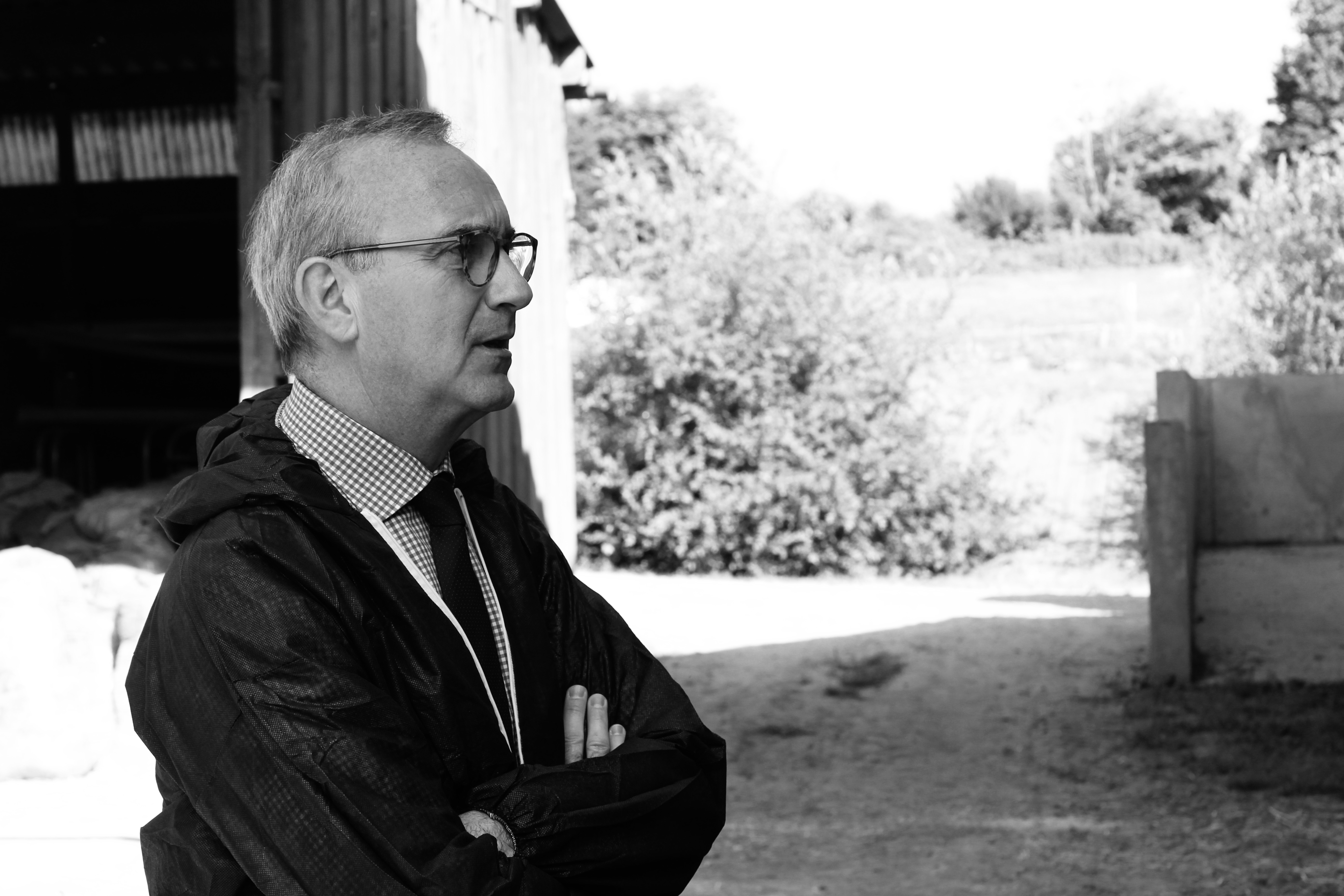

Member of the National Assembly for Sarthe's 5th constituency
- Incumbent
- Assumed office 21 June 2017
- Preceded by: Dominique Le Mèner

Personal details
- Born: 15 March 1966 (age 60) Le Mans, France
- Party: LR; Soyons Libres
- Education: University of Maine; Panthéon-Sorbonne University; Sciences Po

Jean-Carles Grelier (born 15 March 1966) is a French politician of The Republicans (LR) who has represented Sarthe's 5th constituency in the National Assembly since the 2017 election.

== Political career ==
In parliament, Grelier has been serving on the Committee on Social Affairs. In addition to his committee assignments, he is part of the French-Bolivian Parliamentary Friendship Group, the French-Spanish Parliamentary Friendship Group and the French-Uruguayan Parliamentary Friendship Group. In September 2017, he tabled a bill in the National Assembly to ban electoral parachuting.

Grelier left The Republicans in 2017, and joined Soyons Libres. He joins La République en marche for the 2022 legislative elections. Running for re-election, he was re-elected MP with 59.51% of the vote in the second round of voting.
