= Robert Jarry =

French politician

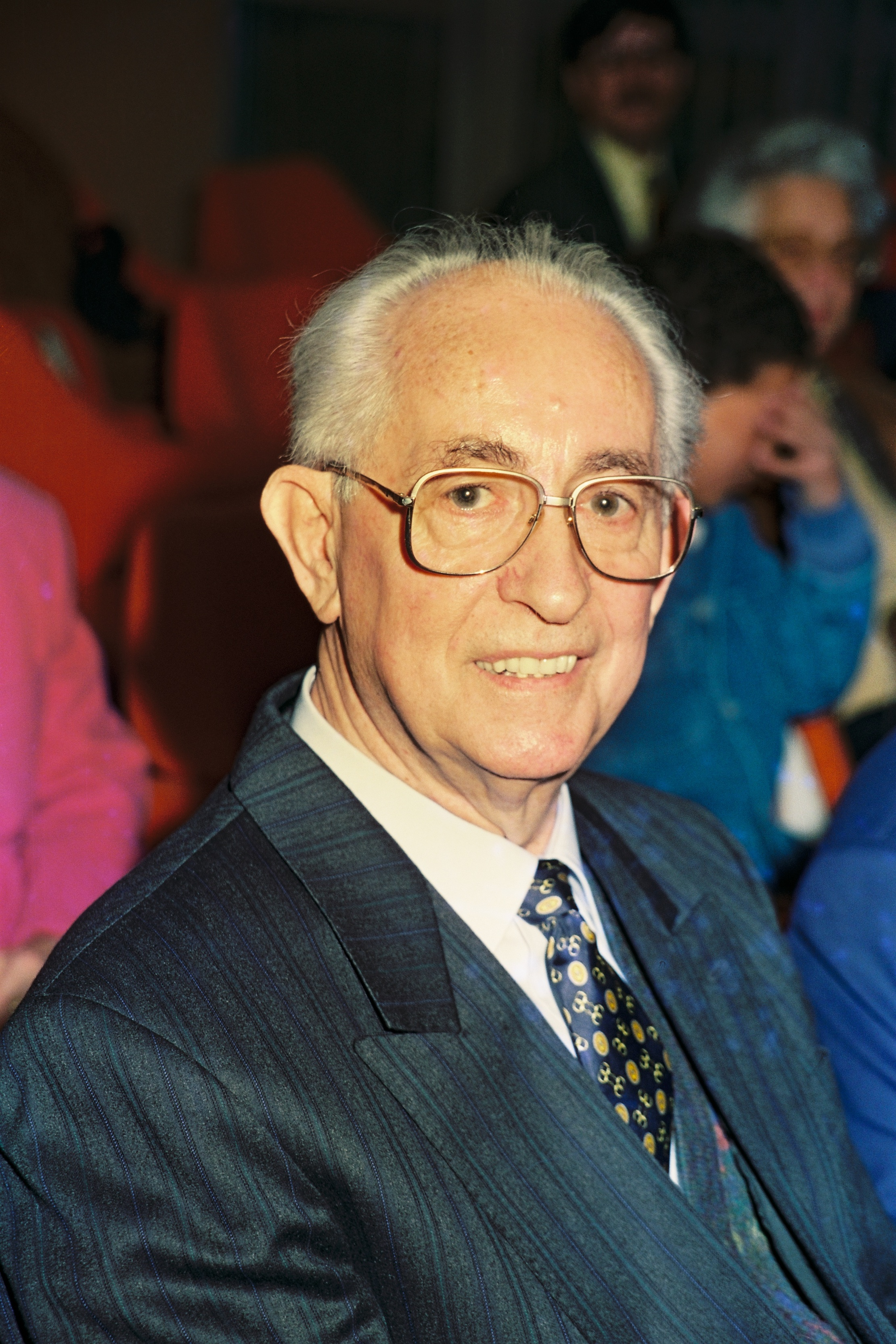
- Jarry in 1995

Mayor of Le Mans
- In office 1977–2001
- Preceded by: Jacques Maury
- Succeeded by: Jean-Claude Boulard

Personal details
- Born: 29 December 1924; Connerré, France
- Died: 17 September 2008 (aged 83); Le Mans, France
- Political party: French Communist Party
- Occupation: Politician

Robert Jarry (29 December 1924 – 17 September 2008) was a French politician.

He was a member of the French Communist Party. He served as Mayor of Le Mans from 1977 to 2001. He will have developed and modernized Le Mans in 24 years. He also encouraged the creation of social housing, retirement homes, sports halls.

== Biography ==
Robert Jarry was born in Connerré, France on 1924 and died in Le Mans, France on 2008 at the age of 83. He was first of all the first secretary of the pcf federation of Sarthe from 1949 to 1977.

Political offices
Preceded by Jacques Maury	Mayor of Le Mans; 1977 – 2001	Succeeded by Jean-Claude Boulard
