= Éric Martineau =

French politician (born 1968)

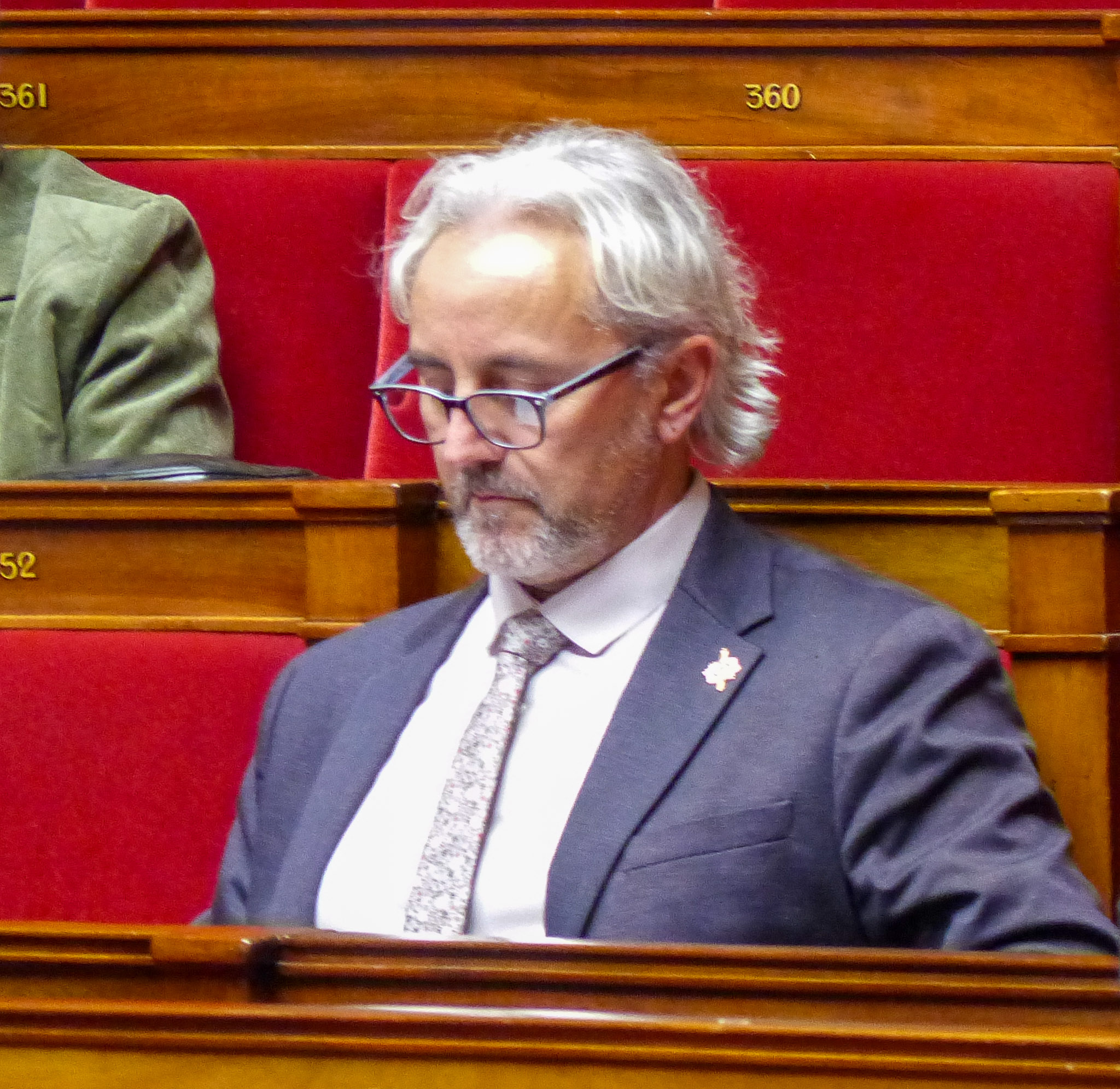

Member of the National Assembly for Sarthe's 3rd constituency
- Incumbent
- Assumed office 22 June 2022
- Preceded by: Pascale Fontenel-Personne

Personal details
- Born: 8 May 1968 (age 58) Le Mans, France
- Party: Democratic Movement

Éric Martineau (French pronunciation: [eʁik maʁtino]; born 8 May 1968) is a French politician from the Democratic Movement who has been representing Sarthe's 3rd constituency in the National Assembly since 2022.

== See also ==
- List of deputies of the 16th National Assembly of France
