= Results of the 2024 French legislative election by constituency =

Following the first round of the 2024 French legislative election on 30 June 2024, runoff elections in each constituency where no candidate received a vote share greater than 50 percent were scheduled for 7 July. Candidates permitted to stand in the runoff elections needed to either come in first or second place in the first round or achieve more than 12.5 percent of the votes of the entire electorate (as opposed to 12.5 percent of the vote share due to low turnout).

Results listed below are according to the Ministry of the Interior, with some more specific parties for newly elected deputies listed in accordance with research by Le Monde. Asterisks (*) indicate incumbents not running for re-election (except in the case of substitutes), and shaded rows indicate seats which changed hands between different alliances (i.e. if an incumbent and newly elected deputy are from different parties within the same alliance, then that row is not highlighted).

Constituency		Incumbent deputy	Party	Elected deputy	Party	Elected in 1st round
Ain	1st	Xavier Breton	LR	Xavier Breton	LR	No
Ain	2nd	Romain Daubié	MoDem	Romain Daubié	MoDem	No
Ain	3rd	Olga Givernet	RE	Olga Givernet	RE	No
Ain	4th	Jérôme Buisson	RN	Jérôme Buisson	RN	No
Ain	5th	Damien Abad	DVD	Marc Chavent	LR (UXD)	No
Aisne	1st	Nicolas Dragon	RN	Nicolas Dragon	RN	Yes
Aisne	2nd	Julien Dive	LR	Julien Dive	LR	No
Aisne	3rd	Jean-Louis Bricout	DVG	Eddy Casterman	EXD	Yes
Aisne	4th	José Beaurain	RN	José Beaurain	RN	Yes
Aisne	5th	Jocelyn Dessigny	RN	Jocelyn Dessigny	RN	Yes
Allier	1st	Yannick Monnet	PCF	Yannick Monnet	PCF	No
Allier	2nd	Jorys Bovet	RN	Jorys Bovet	RN	No
Allier	3rd	Nicolas Ray	LR	Nicolas Ray	LR	No
Alpes-de-Haute-Provence	1st	Christian Girard	RN	Christian Girard	RN	No
Alpes-de-Haute-Provence	2nd	Léo Walter	LFI	Sophie Vaginay-Ricourt	RN	No
Hautes-Alpes	1st	Pascale Boyer	RE	Marie-José Allemand	PS	No
Hautes-Alpes	2nd	Joël Giraud*	PR	Valérie Rossi	PS	No
Alpes-Maritimes	1st	Éric Ciotti	LR (UXD)	Éric Ciotti	LR (UXD)	No
Alpes-Maritimes	2nd	Lionel Tivoli	RN	Lionel Tivoli	RN	No
Alpes-Maritimes	3rd	Philippe Pradal	HOR	Bernard Chaix	LR (UXD)	No
Alpes-Maritimes	4th	Alexandra Masson	RN	Alexandra Masson	RN	Yes
Alpes-Maritimes	5th	Christelle d'Intorni	LR (UXD)	Christelle d'Intorni	LR (UXD)	Yes
Alpes-Maritimes	6th	Bryan Masson	RN	Bryan Masson	RN	Yes
Alpes-Maritimes	7th	Éric Pauget	LR	Éric Pauget	LR	No
Alpes-Maritimes	8th	Alexandra Martin	LR	Alexandra Martin	LR	No
Alpes-Maritimes	9th	Michèle Tabarot	LR	Michèle Tabarot	LR	No
Ardèche	1st	Hervé Saulignac	PS	Hervé Saulignac	PS	No
Ardèche	2nd	Olivier Dussopt*	RE	Vincent Trébuchet	LR (UXD)	No
Ardèche	3rd	Fabrice Brun	DVD	Fabrice Brun	DVD	No
Ardennes	1st	Lionel Vuibert	RE	Flavien Termet	RN	No
Ardennes	2nd	Pierre Cordier	LR	Pierre Cordier	LR	No
Ardennes	3rd	Jean-Luc Warsmann	DVD	Jean-Luc Warsmann	DVD	No
Ariège	1st	Martine Froger	PS	Martine Froger	PS	Yes
Ariège	2nd	Laurent Panifous	PS	Laurent Panifous	PS	No
Aube	1st	Jordan Guitton	RN	Jordan Guitton	RN	Yes
Aube	2nd	Valérie Bazin-Malgras	LR	Valérie Bazin-Malgras	LR	No
Aube	3rd	Angélique Ranc	RN	Angélique Ranc	RN	No
Aude	1st	Christophe Barthès	RN	Christophe Barthès	RN	No
Aude	2nd	Frédéric Falcon	RN	Frédéric Falcon	RN	No
Aude	3rd	Julien Rancoule	RN	Julien Rancoule	RN	No
Aveyron	1st	Stéphane Mazars	RE	Stéphane Mazars	RE	No
Aveyron	2nd	Laurent Alexandre	LFI	Laurent Alexandre	LFI	No
Aveyron	3rd	Jean-François Rousset	RE	Jean-François Rousset	RE	No
Bouches-du-Rhône	1st	Didier Parakian	RE	Monique Griseti	RN	No
Bouches-du-Rhône	2nd	Claire Colomb-Pitollat	RE	Laurent Lhardit	PS	No
Bouches-du-Rhône	3rd	Gisèle Lelouis	RN	Gisèle Lelouis	RN	No
Bouches-du-Rhône	4th	Manuel Bompard	LFI	Manuel Bompard	LFI	Yes
Bouches-du-Rhône	5th	Hendrik Davi	LFI	Hendrik Davi	LFI	No
Bouches-du-Rhône	6th	Lionel Royer-Perreaut	RE	Olivier Fayssat	LR (UXD)	No
Bouches-du-Rhône	7th	Sébastien Delogu	LFI	Sébastien Delogu	LFI	Yes
Bouches-du-Rhône	8th	Jean-Marc Zulesi	RE	Romain Tonussi	RN	No
Bouches-du-Rhône	9th	Joëlle Mélin	RN	Joëlle Mélin	RN	No
Bouches-du-Rhône	10th	José Gonzalez	RN	José Gonzalez	RN	No
Bouches-du-Rhône	11th	Mohamed Laqhila	MoDem	Marc Pena	SE (NFP)	No
Bouches-du-Rhône	12th	Franck Allisio	RN	Franck Allisio	RN	Yes
Bouches-du-Rhône	13th	Pierre Dharréville	PCF	Emmanuel Fouquart	RN	No
Bouches-du-Rhône	14th	Anne-Laurence Petel	RE	Gérault Verny	LR (UXD)	No
Bouches-du-Rhône	15th	Romain Baubry	RN	Romain Baubry	RN	No
Bouches-du-Rhône	16th	Emmanuel Taché de La Pagerie	RN	Emmanuel Taché de La Pagerie	RN	No
Calvados	1st	Fabrice Le Vigoureux*	RE	Joël Bruneau	DVD	No
Calvados	2nd	Arthur Delaporte	PS	Arthur Delaporte	PS	No
Calvados	3rd	Jérémie Patrier-Leitus	HOR	Jérémie Patrier-Leitus	HOR	No
Calvados	4th	Christophe Blanchet	RE	Christophe Blanchet	RE	No
Calvados	5th	Bertrand Bouyx	RE	Bertrand Bouyx	RE	No
Calvados	6th	Élisabeth Borne	RE	Élisabeth Borne	RE	No
Cantal	1st	Vincent Descœur	LR	Vincent Descœur	LR	No
Cantal	2nd	Jean-Yves Bony	LR	Jean-Yves Bony	LR	No
Charente	1st	René Pilato	LFI	René Pilato	LFI	No
Charente	2nd	Sandra Marsaud	RE	Sandra Marsaud	RE	No
Charente	3rd	Caroline Colombier	RN	Caroline Colombier	RN	No
Charente-Maritime	1st	Olivier Falorni	DVG	Olivier Falorni	DVG	No
Charente-Maritime	2nd	Anne-Laure Babault	MoDem	Benoît Biteau	DVE	No
Charente-Maritime	3rd	Jean-Philippe Ardouin	RE	Fabrice Barusseau	PS	No
Charente-Maritime	4th	Raphaël Gérard	RE	Pascal Markowsky	RN	No
Charente-Maritime	5th	Christophe Plassard	HOR	Christophe Plassard	HOR	No
Cher	1st	François Cormier-Bouligeon	RE	François Cormier-Bouligeon	RE	No
Cher	2nd	Nicolas Sansu	PCF	Nicolas Sansu	PCF	No
Cher	3rd	Loïc Kervran	HOR	Loïc Kervran	HOR	No
Corrèze	1st	Francis Dubois	DVD	François Hollande	PS	No
Corrèze	2nd	Frédérique Meunier	LR	Frédérique Meunier	LR	No
Corse-du-Sud	1st	Laurent Marcangeli	HOR	Laurent Marcangeli	HOR	No
Corse-du-Sud	2nd	Paul-André Colombani	PNC	Paul-André Colombani	PNC	No
Haute-Corse	1st	Michel Castellani	FaC	Michel Castellani	FaC	No
Haute-Corse	2nd	Jean-Félix Acquaviva	FaC	François-Xavier Ceccoli	LR	No
Côte-d'Or	1st	Didier Martin	RE	Océane Godard	PS	No
Côte-d'Or	2nd	Benoît Bordat	FP	Catherine Hervieu	LE	No
Côte-d'Or	3rd	Philippe Frei	RE	Pierre Pribetich	PS	No
Côte-d'Or	4th	Hubert Brigand	LR	Hubert Brigand	LR	No
Côte-d'Or	5th	Didier Paris	RE	René Lioret	RN	No
Côtes-d'Armor	1st	Mickaël Cosson	MoDem	Mickaël Cosson	MoDem	No
Côtes-d'Armor	2nd	Chantal Bouloux	RE	Hervé Berville	RE	No
Côtes-d'Armor	3rd	Marc Le Fur*	LR	Corentin Le Fur	LR	No
Côtes-d'Armor	4th	Murielle Lepvraud	LFI	Murielle Lepvraud	LFI	No
Côtes-d'Armor	5th	Éric Bothorel	RE	Éric Bothorel	RE	No
Creuse	1st	Catherine Couturier	LFI	Bartolomé Lenoir	LR (UXD)	No
Dordogne	1st	Pascale Martin	LFI	Nadine Lechon	RN	No
Dordogne	2nd	Serge Muller	RN	Serge Muller	RN	No
Dordogne	3rd	Jean-Pierre Cubertafon	MoDem	Florence Joubert	RN	No
Dordogne	4th	Sébastien Peytavie	G.s	Sébastien Peytavie	G.s	No
Doubs	1st	Laurent Croizier	MoDem	Laurent Croizier	MoDem	No
Doubs	2nd	Éric Alauzet*	RE	Dominique Voynet	LE	No
Doubs	3rd	Nicolas Pacquot	RE	Matthieu Bloch	LR (UXD)	No
Doubs	4th	Géraldine Grangier	RN	Géraldine Grangier	RN	No
Doubs	5th	Annie Genevard	LR	Annie Genevard	LR	No
Drôme	1st	Mireille Clapot	RE	Paul Christophle	PS	No
Drôme	2nd	Lisette Pollet	RN	Lisette Pollet	RN	No
Drôme	3rd	Marie Pochon	LE	Marie Pochon	LE	No
Drôme	4th	Emmanuelle Anthoine	LR	Thibaut Monnier	RN	No
Eure	1st	Christine Loir	RN	Christine Loir	RN	No
Eure	2nd	Katiana Levavasseur	RN	Katiana Levavasseur	RN	No
Eure	3rd	Kévin Mauvieux	RN	Kévin Mauvieux	RN	No
Eure	4th	Philippe Brun	PS	Philippe Brun	PS	No
Eure	5th	Timothée Houssin	RN	Timothée Houssin	RN	No
Eure-et-Loir	1st	Véronique de Montchalin*	RE	Guillaume Kasbarian	RE	No
Eure-et-Loir	2nd	Olivier Marleix	LR	Olivier Marleix	LR	No
Eure-et-Loir	3rd	Luc Lamirault*	HOR	Harold Huwart	PR	No
Eure-et-Loir	4th	Philippe Vigier	MoDem	Philippe Vigier	MoDem	No
Finistère	1st	Annaïg Le Meur	RE	Annaïg Le Meur	RE	No
Finistère	2nd	Jean-Charles Larsonneur	DVC	Pierre-Yves Cadalen	LFI	No
Finistère	3rd	Didier Le Gac	RE	Didier Le Gac	RE	No
Finistère	4th	Sandrine Le Feur	RE	Sandrine Le Feur	RE	No
Finistère	5th	Graziella Melchior	RE	Graziella Melchior	RE	No
Finistère	6th	Mélanie Thomin	PS	Mélanie Thomin	PS	No
Finistère	7th	Liliana Tanguy	RE	Liliana Tanguy	RE	No
Finistère	8th	Erwan Balanant	MoDem	Erwan Balanant	MoDem	No
Gard	1st	Yoann Gillet	RN	Yoann Gillet	RN	No
Gard	2nd	Nicolas Meizonnet	RN	Nicolas Meizonnet	RN	Yes
Gard	3rd	Pascale Bordes	RN	Pascale Bordes	RN	No
Gard	4th	Pierre Meurin	RN	Pierre Meurin	RN	No
Gard	5th	Michel Sala	LFI	Alexandre Allegret-Pilot	LR (UXD)	No
Gard	6th	Philippe Berta*	MoDem	Sylvie Josserand	RN	No
Haute-Garonne	1st	Hadrien Clouet	LFI	Hadrien Clouet	LFI	No
Haute-Garonne	2nd	Anne Stambach-Terrenoir	LFI	Anne Stambach-Terrenoir	LFI	No
Haute-Garonne	3rd	Corinne Vignon	RE	Corinne Vignon	RE	No
Haute-Garonne	4th	François Piquemal	LFI	François Piquemal	LFI	Yes
Haute-Garonne	5th	Jean-François Portarrieu	AC	Jean-François Portarrieu	AC	No
Haute-Garonne	6th	Monique Iborra	RE	Arnaud Simion	PS	No
Haute-Garonne	7th	Christophe Bex	LFI	Christophe Bex	LFI	No
Haute-Garonne	8th	Joël Aviragnet	PS	Joël Aviragnet	PS	No
Haute-Garonne	9th	Christine Arrighi	LE	Christine Arrighi	LE	No
Haute-Garonne	10th	Laurent Esquenet-Goxes	MoDem	Jacques Oberti	PS	No
Gers	1st	Jean-René Cazeneuve	RE	Jean-René Cazeneuve	RE	No
Gers	2nd	David Taupiac	DVG	David Taupiac	DVG	No
Gironde	1st	Alexandra Martin	RE	Thomas Cazenave	RE	No
Gironde	2nd	Nicolas Thierry	LE	Nicolas Thierry	LE	No
Gironde	3rd	Loïc Prud'homme	LFI	Loïc Prud'homme	LFI	No
Gironde	4th	Alain David	PS	Alain David	PS	No
Gironde	5th	Grégoire de Fournas	RN	Pascale Got	PS	No
Gironde	6th	Éric Poulliat	RE	Marie Récalde	PS	No
Gironde	7th	Bérangère Couillard	RE	Sébastien Saint-Pasteur	PS	No
Gironde	8th	Sophie Panonacle	RE	Sophie Panonacle	RE	No
Gironde	9th	Sophie Mette	MoDem	Sophie Mette	MoDem	No
Gironde	10th	Florent Boudié	RE	Florent Boudié	RE	No
Gironde	11th	Edwige Diaz	RN	Edwige Diaz	RN	Yes
Gironde	12th	Pascal Lavergne	RE	Mathilde Feld	LFI	No
Hérault	1st	Philippe Sorez	RE	Jean-Louis Roumégas	LE	No
Hérault	2nd	Nathalie Oziol	LFI	Nathalie Oziol	LFI	Yes
Hérault	3rd	Laurence Cristol	RE	Fanny Dombre-Coste	PS	No
Hérault	4th	Sébastien Rome	LFI	Manon Bouquin	RN	No
Hérault	5th	Stéphanie Galzy	RN	Stéphanie Galzy	RN	No
Hérault	6th	Emmanuelle Ménard	DVD	Julien Gabarron	RN	No
Hérault	7th	Aurélien Lopez-Liguori	RN	Aurélien Lopez-Liguori	RN	Yes
Hérault	8th	Sylvain Carrière	LFI	Sylvain Carrière	LFI	No
Hérault	9th	Patrick Vignal	RE	Charles Alloncle	LR (UXD)	No
Ille-et-Vilaine	1st	Frédéric Mathieu*	LFI	Marie Mesmeur	LFI	No
Ille-et-Vilaine	2nd	Laurence Maillart-Méhaignerie	RE	Tristan Lahais	G.s	No
Ille-et-Vilaine	3rd	Claudia Rouaux	PS	Claudia Rouaux	PS	No
Ille-et-Vilaine	4th	Mathilde Hignet	LFI	Mathilde Hignet	LFI	No
Ille-et-Vilaine	5th	Christine Le Nabour	RE	Christine Le Nabour	RE	No
Ille-et-Vilaine	6th	Thierry Benoit	HOR	Thierry Benoit	HOR	No
Ille-et-Vilaine	7th	Jean-Luc Bourgeaux	DVD	Jean-Luc Bourgeaux	DVD	No
Ille-et-Vilaine	8th	Mickaël Bouloux	PS	Mickaël Bouloux	PS	Yes
Indre	1st	François Jolivet	HOR	François Jolivet	HOR	No
Indre	2nd	Nicolas Forissier	LR	Nicolas Forissier	LR	No
Indre-et-Loire	1st	Charles Fournier	LE	Charles Fournier	LE	No
Indre-et-Loire	2nd	Daniel Labaronne	RE	Daniel Labaronne	RE	No
Indre-et-Loire	3rd	Henri Alfandari	HOR	Henri Alfandari	HOR	No
Indre-et-Loire	4th	Fabienne Colboc	RE	Laurent Baumel	PS	No
Indre-et-Loire	5th	Sabine Thillaye	MoDem	Sabine Thillaye	MoDem	No
Isère	1st	Olivier Véran	RE	Hugo Prevost	LFI	No
Isère	2nd	Cyrielle Chatelain	LE	Cyrielle Chatelain	LE	No
Isère	3rd	Élisa Martin	LFI	Élisa Martin	LFI	No
Isère	4th	Marie-Noëlle Battistel	PS	Marie-Noëlle Battistel	PS	No
Isère	5th	Jérémie Iordanoff	LE	Jérémie Iordanoff	LE	No
Isère	6th	Alexis Jolly	RN	Alexis Jolly	RN	No
Isère	7th	Yannick Neuder	LR	Yannick Neuder	LR	No
Isère	8th	Caroline Abadie	RE	Hanane Mansouri	LR (UXD)	No
Isère	9th	Élodie Jacquier-Laforge	MoDem	Sandrine Nosbé	LFI	No
Isère	10th	Marjolaine Meynier-Millefert	RE	Thierry Perez	RN	No
Jura	1st	Danielle Brulebois	RE	Danielle Brulebois	RE	No
Jura	2nd	Marie-Christine Dalloz	LR	Marie-Christine Dalloz	LR	No
Jura	3rd	Justine Gruet	LR	Justine Gruet	LR	No
Landes	1st	Geneviève Darrieussecq	MoDem	Geneviève Darrieussecq	MoDem	No
Landes	2nd	Lionel Causse	RE	Lionel Causse	RE	No
Landes	3rd	Boris Vallaud	PS	Boris Vallaud	PS	No
Loir-et-Cher	1st	Mathilde Desjonquères	MoDem	Marc Fesneau	MoDem	No
Loir-et-Cher	2nd	Roger Chudeau	RN	Roger Chudeau	RN	No
Loir-et-Cher	3rd	Christophe Marion	RE	Christophe Marion	RE	No
Loire	1st	Quentin Bataillon	RE	Pierrick Courbon	PS	No
Loire	2nd	Andrée Taurinya	LFI	Andrée Taurinya	LFI	No
Loire	3rd	Emmanuel Mandon	MoDem	Emmanuel Mandon	MoDem	No
Loire	4th	Sylvie Bonnet	LR	Sylvie Bonnet	LR	No
Loire	5th	Antoine Vermorel-Marques	LR	Antoine Vermorel-Marques	LR	No
Loire	6th	Jean-Pierre Taite	LR	Jean-Pierre Taite	LR	No
Haute-Loire	1st	Isabelle Valentin*	LR	Laurent Wauquiez	LR	No
Haute-Loire	2nd	Jean-Pierre Vigier	LR	Jean-Pierre Vigier	LR	No
Loire-Atlantique	1st	Mounir Belhamiti	RE	Karim Benbrahim	PS	No
Loire-Atlantique	2nd	Andy Kerbrat	LFI	Andy Kerbrat	LFI	Yes
Loire-Atlantique	3rd	Ségolène Amiot	LFI	Ségolène Amiot	LFI	No
Loire-Atlantique	4th	Julie Laernoes	LE	Julie Laernoes	LE	No
Loire-Atlantique	5th	Luc Geismar	MoDem	Fabrice Roussel	PS	No
Loire-Atlantique	6th	Jean-Claude Raux	LE	Jean-Claude Raux	LE	No
Loire-Atlantique	7th	Sandrine Josso	MoDem	Sandrine Josso	MoDem	No
Loire-Atlantique	8th	Matthias Tavel	LFI	Matthias Tavel	LFI	No
Loire-Atlantique	9th	Yannick Haury*	RE	Jean-Michel Brard	SE (ENS)	No
Loire-Atlantique	10th	Sophie Errante	RE	Sophie Errante	RE	No
Loiret	1st	Stéphanie Rist	RE	Stéphanie Rist	RE	No
Loiret	2nd	Caroline Janvier	RE	Emmanuel Duplessy	G.s	No
Loiret	3rd	Mathilde Paris	RN	Constance de Pélichy	DVD	No
Loiret	4th	Thomas Ménagé	RN	Thomas Ménagé	RN	No
Loiret	5th	Anthony Brosse	RE	Anthony Brosse	RE	No
Loiret	6th	Richard Ramos	MoDem	Richard Ramos	MoDem	No
Lot	1st	Aurélien Pradié	LR	Aurélien Pradié	LR	No
Lot	2nd	Huguette Tiegna	RE	Christophe Proença	PS	No
Lot-et-Garonne	1st	Michel Lauzzana	RE	Michel Lauzzana	RE	No
Lot-et-Garonne	2nd	Hélène Laporte	RN	Hélène Laporte	RN	No
Lot-et-Garonne	3rd	Annick Cousin	RN	Guillaume Lepers	LR	No
Lozère	1st	Pierre Morel-À-L'Huissier	UDI	Sophie Pantel	PS	No
Maine-et-Loire	1st	François Gernigon	HOR	François Gernigon	HOR	No
Maine-et-Loire	2nd	Stella Dupont	RE	Stella Dupont	RE	No
Maine-et-Loire	3rd	Anne-Laure Blin	LR	Anne-Laure Blin	LR	No
Maine-et-Loire	4th	Laetitia Saint-Paul	RE	Laetitia Saint-Paul	RE	No
Maine-et-Loire	5th	Denis Masséglia	RE	Denis Masséglia	RE	No
Maine-et-Loire	6th	Nicole Dubré-Chirat	RE	Nicole Dubré-Chirat	RE	No
Maine-et-Loire	7th	Philippe Bolo	MoDem	Philippe Bolo	MoDem	No
Manche	1st	Philippe Gosselin	LR	Philippe Gosselin	LR	No
Manche	2nd	Bertrand Sorre	RE	Bertrand Sorre	RE	No
Manche	3rd	Stéphane Travert	RE	Stéphane Travert	RE	No
Manche	4th	Anna Pic	PS	Anna Pic	PS	No
Marne	1st	Xavier Albertini	HOR	Xavier Albertini	HOR	No
Marne	2nd	Laure Miller	RE	Laure Miller	RE	No
Marne	3rd	Éric Girardin	RE	Maxime Michelet	LR (UXD)	No
Marne	4th	Lise Magnier	HOR	Lise Magnier	HOR	No
Marne	5th	Charles de Courson	LC	Charles de Courson	LC	No
Haute-Marne	1st	Christophe Bentz	RN	Christophe Bentz	RN	No
Haute-Marne	2nd	Laurence Robert-Dehault	RN	Laurence Robert-Dehault	RN	Yes
Mayenne	1st	Guillaume Garot	PS	Guillaume Garot	PS	No
Mayenne	2nd	Géraldine Bannier	MoDem	Géraldine Bannier	MoDem	No
Mayenne	3rd	Yannick Favennec-Bécot	HOR	Yannick Favennec-Bécot	HOR	No
Meurthe-et-Moselle	1st	Carole Grandjean*	RE	Estelle Mercier	PS	No
Meurthe-et-Moselle	2nd	Emmanuel Lacresse	RE	Stéphane Hablot	PS	No
Meurthe-et-Moselle	3rd	Martine Étienne	LFI	Frédéric Weber	RN	No
Meurthe-et-Moselle	4th	Thibault Bazin	DVD	Thibault Bazin	DVD	No
Meurthe-et-Moselle	5th	Dominique Potier	PS	Dominique Potier	PS	No
Meurthe-et-Moselle	6th	Caroline Fiat	LFI	Anthony Boulogne	RN	No
Meuse	1st	Bertrand Pancher	DVD	Maxime Amblard	RN	No
Meuse	2nd	Florence Goulet	RN	Florence Goulet	RN	Yes
Morbihan	1st	Anne Le Hénanff	HOR	Anne Le Hénanff	HOR	No
Morbihan	2nd	Jimmy Pahun	MoDem	Jimmy Pahun	MoDem	No
Morbihan	3rd	Nicole Le Peih	RE	Nicole Le Peih	RE	No
Morbihan	4th	Paul Molac	REG	Paul Molac	REG	No
Morbihan	5th	Lysiane Métayer	RE	Damien Girard	LE	No
Morbihan	6th	Jean-Michel Jacques	RE	Jean-Michel Jacques	RE	No
Moselle	1st	Belkhir Belhaddad	RE	Belkhir Belhaddad	RE	No
Moselle	2nd	Ludovic Mendes	RE	Ludovic Mendes	RE	No
Moselle	3rd	Charlotte Leduc	LFI	Nathalie Colin-Oesterlé	UDI	No
Moselle	4th	Fabien Di Filippo	LR	Fabien Di Filippo	LR	No
Moselle	5th	Vincent Seitlinger	LR	Pascal Jenft	LR (UXD)	No
Moselle	6th	Kévin Pfeffer	RN	Kévin Pfeffer	RN	Yes
Moselle	7th	Alexandre Loubet	RN	Alexandre Loubet	RN	Yes
Moselle	8th	Laurent Jacobelli	RN	Laurent Jacobelli	RN	No
Moselle	9th	Isabelle Rauch	HOR	Isabelle Rauch	HOR	No
Nièvre	1st	Perrine Goulet	MoDem	Perrine Goulet	MoDem	No
Nièvre	2nd	Patrice Perrot*	RE	Julien Guibert	RN	No
Nord	1st	Adrien Quatennens*	LFI	Aurélien Le Coq	LFI	No
Nord	2nd	Ugo Bernalicis	LFI	Ugo Bernalicis	LFI	No
Nord	3rd	Benjamin Saint-Huile	DVG	Sandra Delannoy	RN	Yes
Nord	4th	Brigitte Liso	RE	Brigitte Liso	RE	No
Nord	5th	Victor Catteau	RN	Sébastien Huyghe	SE (ENS)	No
Nord	6th	Charlotte Parmentier-Lecocq	RE	Charlotte Parmentier-Lecocq	RE	No
Nord	7th	Félicie Gérard	HOR	Félicie Gérard	HOR	No
Nord	8th	David Guiraud	LFI	David Guiraud	LFI	No
Nord	9th	Violette Spillebout	RE	Violette Spillebout	RE	No
Nord	10th	Vincent Ledoux	RE	Gérald Darmanin	RE	No
Nord	11th	Roger Vicot	PS	Roger Vicot	PS	No
Nord	12th	Michaël Taverne	RN	Michaël Taverne	RN	Yes
Nord	13th	Christine Decodts*	RE	Julien Gokel	PS	No
Nord	14th	Paul Christophe	HOR	Paul Christophe	HOR	No
Nord	15th	Pierrick Berteloot	RN	Jean-Pierre Bataille	DVD	No
Nord	16th	Matthieu Marchio	RN	Matthieu Marchio	RN	Yes
Nord	17th	Thibaut François*	RN	Thierry Tesson	LR (UXD)	No
Nord	18th	Guy Bricout*	UDI	Alexandre Dufosset	RN	Yes
Nord	19th	Sébastien Chenu	RN	Sébastien Chenu	RN	Yes
Nord	20th	Fabien Roussel	PCF	Guillaume Florquin	RN	Yes
Nord	21st	Béatrice Descamps*	PR	Valérie Létard	UDI	No
Oise	1st	Victor Habert-Dassault	LR	Claire Marais-Beuil	RN	No
Oise	2nd	Philippe Ballard	RN	Philippe Ballard	RN	Yes
Oise	3rd	Alexandre Sabatou	RN	Alexandre Sabatou	RN	No
Oise	4th	Éric Woerth	RE	Éric Woerth	RE	No
Oise	5th	Pierre Vatin	LR	Frédéric Pierre Vos	RN	No
Oise	6th	Michel Guiniot	RN	Michel Guiniot	RN	No
Oise	7th	Maxime Minot	LR	David Magnier	RN	No
Orne	1st	Chantal Jourdan	PS	Chantal Jourdan	PS	No
Orne	2nd	Véronique Louwagie	LR	Véronique Louwagie	LR	No
Orne	3rd	Jérôme Nury	LR	Jérôme Nury	LR	No
Pas-de-Calais	1st	Emmanuel Blairy	RN	Emmanuel Blairy	RN	Yes
Pas-de-Calais	2nd	Jacqueline Maquet*	RE	Agnès Pannier-Runacher	RE	No
Pas-de-Calais	3rd	Jean-Marc Tellier	PCF	Bruno Clavet	RN	Yes
Pas-de-Calais	4th	Philippe Fait	RE	Philippe Fait	RE	No
Pas-de-Calais	5th	Jean-Pierre Pont	RE	Antoine Golliot	RN	No
Pas-de-Calais	6th	Christine Engrand	RN	Christine Engrand	RN	Yes
Pas-de-Calais	7th	Pierre-Henri Dumont	LR	Marc de Fleurian	RN	No
Pas-de-Calais	8th	Bertrand Petit	PS	Auguste Evrard	RN	No
Pas-de-Calais	9th	Caroline Parmentier	RN	Caroline Parmentier	RN	No
Pas-de-Calais	10th	Thierry Frappé	RN	Thierry Frappé	RN	Yes
Pas-de-Calais	11th	Marine Le Pen	RN	Marine Le Pen	RN	Yes
Pas-de-Calais	12th	Bruno Bilde	RN	Bruno Bilde	RN	Yes
Puy-de-Dôme	1st	Marianne Maximi	LFI	Marianne Maximi	LFI	No
Puy-de-Dôme	2nd	Christine Pirès-Beaune	PS	Christine Pirès-Beaune	PS	No
Puy-de-Dôme	3rd	Laurence Vichnievsky	MoDem	Nicolas Bonnet	LE	No
Puy-de-Dôme	4th	Delphine Lingemann	MoDem	Delphine Lingemann	MoDem	No
Puy-de-Dôme	5th	André Chassaigne	PCF	André Chassaigne	PCF	No
Pyrénées-Atlantiques	1st	Josy Poueyto	MoDem	Josy Poueyto	MoDem	No
Pyrénées-Atlantiques	2nd	Jean-Paul Mattei	MoDem	Jean-Paul Mattei	MoDem	No
Pyrénées-Atlantiques	3rd	David Habib	DVG	David Habib	DVG	No
Pyrénées-Atlantiques	4th	Iñaki Echaniz	PS	Iñaki Echaniz	PS	No
Pyrénées-Atlantiques	5th	Florence Lasserre	MoDem	Colette Capdevielle	PS	No
Pyrénées-Atlantiques	6th	Vincent Bru*	MoDem	Peio Dufau	EH Bai	No
Hautes-Pyrénées	1st	Sylvie Ferrer	LFI	Sylvie Ferrer	LFI	No
Hautes-Pyrénées	2nd	Benoît Mournet	RE	Denis Fégné	PS	No
Pyrénées-Orientales	1st	Sophie Blanc	RN	Sophie Blanc	RN	No
Pyrénées-Orientales	2nd	Anaïs Sabatini	RN	Anaïs Sabatini	RN	Yes
Pyrénées-Orientales	3rd	Sandrine Dogor-Such	RN	Sandrine Dogor-Such	RN	No
Pyrénées-Orientales	4th	Michèle Martinez	RN	Michèle Martinez	RN	No
Bas-Rhin	1st	Sandra Regol	LE	Sandra Regol	LE	No
Bas-Rhin	2nd	Emmanuel Fernandes	LFI	Emmanuel Fernandes	LFI	No
Bas-Rhin	3rd	Bruno Studer	RE	Thierry Sother	PS	No
Bas-Rhin	4th	Françoise Buffet	RE	Françoise Buffet	RE	No
Bas-Rhin	5th	Charles Sitzenstuhl	RE	Charles Sitzenstuhl	RE	No
Bas-Rhin	6th	Louise Morel	MoDem	Louise Morel	MoDem	No
Bas-Rhin	7th	Patrick Hetzel	LR	Patrick Hetzel	LR	No
Bas-Rhin	8th	Stéphanie Kochert	HOR	Théo Bernhardt	RN	No
Bas-Rhin	9th	Vincent Thiébaut	HOR	Vincent Thiébaut	HOR	No
Haut-Rhin	1st	Brigitte Klinkert	RE	Brigitte Klinkert	RE	No
Haut-Rhin	2nd	Hubert Ott	MoDem	Hubert Ott	MoDem	No
Haut-Rhin	3rd	Didier Lemaire	HOR	Didier Lemaire	HOR	No
Haut-Rhin	4th	Raphaël Schellenberger	LR	Raphaël Schellenberger	LR	No
Haut-Rhin	5th	Olivier Becht	RE	Olivier Becht	RE	No
Haut-Rhin	6th	Bruno Fuchs	MoDem	Bruno Fuchs	MoDem	No
Rhône	1st	Thomas Rudigoz	RE	Anaïs Belouassa-Cherifi	LFI	No
Rhône	2nd	Hubert Julien-Laferrière*	DVE	Boris Tavernier	LE	No
Rhône	3rd	Marie-Charlotte Garin	LE	Marie-Charlotte Garin	LE	Yes
Rhône	4th	Anne Brugnera	RE	Sandrine Runel	PS	No
Rhône	5th	Blandine Brocard	MoDem	Blandine Brocard	MoDem	No
Rhône	6th	Gabriel Amard	LFI	Gabriel Amard	LFI	No
Rhône	7th	Alexandre Vincendet	HOR	Abdelkader Lahmar	LFI	No
Rhône	8th	Nathalie Serre	LR	Jonathan Gery	RN	No
Rhône	9th	Alexandre Portier	LR	Alexandre Portier	LR	No
Rhône	10th	Thomas Gassilloud	RE	Thomas Gassilloud	RE	No
Rhône	11th	Jean-Luc Fugit	RE	Jean-Luc Fugit	RE	No
Rhône	12th	Cyrille Isaac-Sibille	MoDem	Cyrille Isaac-Sibille	MoDem	No
Rhône	13th	Sarah Tanzilli	RE	Tiffany Joncour	RN	No
Rhône	14th	Idir Boumertit	LFI	Idir Boumertit	LFI	No
Haute-Saône	1st	Antoine Villedieu	RN	Antoine Villedieu	RN	No
Haute-Saône	2nd	Emeric Salmon	RN	Emeric Salmon	RN	Yes
Saône-et-Loire	1st	Benjamin Dirx	RE	Benjamin Dirx	RE	No
Saône-et-Loire	2nd	Josiane Corneloup	LR	Josiane Corneloup	LR	No
Saône-et-Loire	3rd	Rémy Rebeyrotte	RE	Aurélien Dutremble	RN	No
Saône-et-Loire	4th	Cécile Untermaier	PS	Eric Michoux	LR (UXD)	No
Saône-et-Loire	5th	Louis Margueritte	RE	Arnaud Sanvert	RN	No
Sarthe	1st	Julie Delpech	RE	Julie Delpech	RE	No
Sarthe	2nd	Marietta Karamanli	PS	Marietta Karamanli	PS	No
Sarthe	3rd	Éric Martineau	MoDem	Éric Martineau	MoDem	No
Sarthe	4th	Élise Leboucher	LFI	Élise Leboucher	LFI	No
Sarthe	5th	Jean-Carles Grelier	RE	Jean-Carles Grelier	RE	No
Savoie	1st	Didier Padey	MoDem	Marina Ferrari	MoDem	No
Savoie	2nd	Vincent Rolland	LR	Vincent Rolland	LR	No
Savoie	3rd	Émilie Bonnivard	LR	Émilie Bonnivard	LR	No
Savoie	4th	Jean-François Coulomme	LFI	Jean-François Coulomme	LFI	No
Haute-Savoie	1st	Véronique Riotton	RE	Véronique Riotton	RE	No
Haute-Savoie	2nd	Antoine Armand	RE	Antoine Armand	RE	No
Haute-Savoie	3rd	Christelle Petex-Levet	LR	Christelle Petex-Levet	LR	No
Haute-Savoie	4th	Virginie Duby-Muller	LR	Virginie Duby-Muller	LR	No
Haute-Savoie	5th	Anne-Cécile Violland	HOR	Anne-Cécile Violland	HOR	No
Haute-Savoie	6th	Xavier Roseren	RE	Xavier Roseren	RE	No
Paris	1st	Sylvain Maillard	RE	Sylvain Maillard	RE	No
Paris	2nd	Gilles Le Gendre	RE	Jean Laussucq	SE (ENS)	No
Paris	3rd	Caroline Yadan	RE	Léa Balage El Mariky	LE	No
Paris	4th	Astrid Panosyan-Bouvet	RE	Astrid Panosyan-Bouvet	RE	No
Paris	5th	Julien Bayou*	DVE	Pouria Amirshahi	LE	Yes
Paris	6th	Sophia Chikirou	LFI	Sophia Chikirou	LFI	Yes
Paris	7th	Clément Beaune	RE	Emmanuel Grégoire	PS	Yes
Paris	8th	Éva Sas	LE	Éva Sas	LE	Yes
Paris	9th	Sandrine Rousseau	LE	Sandrine Rousseau	LE	Yes
Paris	10th	Rodrigo Arenas	LFI	Rodrigo Arenas	LFI	Yes
Paris	11th	Maud Gatel	MoDem	Céline Hervieu	PS	No
Paris	12th	Fanta Berete	RE	Olivia Gregoire	RE	No
Paris	13th	David Amiel	RE	David Amiel	RE	No
Paris	14th	Benjamin Haddad	RE	Benjamin Haddad	RE	No
Paris	15th	Danielle Simonnet	LFI	Danielle Simonnet	LFI	No
Paris	16th	Sarah Legrain	LFI	Sarah Legrain	LFI	Yes
Paris	17th	Danièle Obono	LFI	Danièle Obono	LFI	Yes
Paris	18th	Aymeric Caron	REV	Aymeric Caron	REV	Yes
Seine-Maritime	1st	Damien Adam	RE	Florence Hérouin-Léautey	PS	No
Seine-Maritime	2nd	Annie Vidal	RE	Annie Vidal	RE	No
Seine-Maritime	3rd	Édouard Bénard	PCF	Édouard Bénard	PCF	No
Seine-Maritime	4th	Alma Dufour	LFI	Alma Dufour	LFI	No
Seine-Maritime	5th	Gérard Leseul	PS	Gérard Leseul	PS	No
Seine-Maritime	6th	Sébastien Jumel	PCF	Patrice Martin	RN	No
Seine-Maritime	7th	Agnès Firmin-Le Bodo	HOR	Agnès Firmin-Le Bodo	HOR	No
Seine-Maritime	8th	Jean-Paul Lecoq	PCF	Jean-Paul Lecoq	PCF	No
Seine-Maritime	9th	Marie-Agnès Poussier-Winsback	HOR	Marie-Agnès Poussier-Winsback	HOR	No
Seine-Maritime	10th	Xavier Batut	HOR	Robert Le Bourgeois	RN	No
Seine-et-Marne	1st	Aude Luquet	MoDem	Arnaud Saint-Martin	LFI	No
Seine-et-Marne	2nd	Juliette Vilgrain	HOR	Frédéric Valletoux	HOR	No
Seine-et-Marne	3rd	Jean-Louis Thiériot	LR	Jean-Louis Thiériot	LR	No
Seine-et-Marne	4th	Isabelle Périgault	LR	Julien Limongi	RN	No
Seine-et-Marne	5th	Patricia Lemoine	RE	Franck Riester	RE	No
Seine-et-Marne	6th	Béatrice Roullaud	RN	Béatrice Roullaud	RN	No
Seine-et-Marne	7th	Ersilia Soudais	LFI	Ersilia Soudais	LFI	No
Seine-et-Marne	8th	Hadrien Ghomi	RE	Arnaud Bonnet	LE	No
Seine-et-Marne	9th	Michèle Peyron	RE	Céline Thiébault-Martinez	PS	No
Seine-et-Marne	10th	Maxime Laisney	LFI	Maxime Laisney	LFI	No
Seine-et-Marne	11th	Olivier Faure	PS	Olivier Faure	PS	Yes
Yvelines	1st	Charles Rodwell	RE	Charles Rodwell	RE	No
Yvelines	2nd	Anne Bergantz	MoDem	Jean-Noël Barrot	MoDem	No
Yvelines	3rd	Béatrice Piron	RE	Béatrice Piron	RE	No
Yvelines	4th	Denis Bernaert	HOR	Marie Lebec	RE	No
Yvelines	5th	Yaël Braun-Pivet	RE	Yaël Braun-Pivet	RE	No
Yvelines	6th	Natalia Pouzyreff	RE	Natalia Pouzyreff	RE	No
Yvelines	7th	Nadia Hai	RE	Aurélien Rousseau	PP	No
Yvelines	8th	Benjamin Lucas	G.s	Benjamin Lucas	G.s	No
Yvelines	9th	Bruno Millienne	MoDem	Dieynaba Diop	PS	No
Yvelines	10th	Philippe Emmanuel*	RE	Aurore Bergé	RE	No
Yvelines	11th	William Martinet	LFI	Laurent Mazaury	UDI	No
Yvelines	12th	Karl Olive	RE	Karl Olive	RE	No
Deux-Sèvres	1st	Bastien Marchive	PR	Bastien Marchive	PR	No
Deux-Sèvres	2nd	Delphine Batho	GE	Delphine Batho	GE	No
Deux-Sèvres	3rd	Jean-Marie Fiévet	RE	Jean-Marie Fiévet	RE	No
Somme	1st	François Ruffin	PD	François Ruffin	PD	No
Somme	2nd	Ingrid Dordain	EC	Zahia Hamdane	LFI	No
Somme	3rd	Emmanuel Maquet	LR	Matthias Renault	RN	No
Somme	4th	Jean-Philippe Tanguy	RN	Jean-Philippe Tanguy	RN	No
Somme	5th	Yaël Menache	RN	Yaël Menache	RN	Yes
Tarn	1st	Frédéric Cabrolier	RN	Philippe Bonnecarrère	AC	No
Tarn	2nd	Karen Erodi	LFI	Karen Erodi	LFI	No
Tarn	3rd	Jean Terlier	RE	Jean Terlier	RE	No
Tarn-et-Garonne	1st	Valérie Rabault	PS	Brigitte Barèges	LR (UXD)	No
Tarn-et-Garonne	2nd	Marine Hamelet	RN	Marine Hamelet	RN	No
Var	1st	Yannick Chenevard	RE	Yannick Chenevard	RE	No
Var	2nd	Laure Lavalette	RN	Laure Lavalette	RN	Yes
Var	3rd	Stéphane Rambaud	RN	Stéphane Rambaud	RN	No
Var	4th	Philippe Lottiaux	RN	Philippe Lottiaux	RN	Yes
Var	5th	Julie Lechanteux	RN	Julie Lechanteux	RN	Yes
Var	6th	Frank Giletti	RN	Frank Giletti	RN	Yes
Var	7th	Frédéric Boccaletti	RN	Frédéric Boccaletti	RN	No
Var	8th	Philippe Schreck	RN	Philippe Schreck	RN	Yes
Vaucluse	1st	Catherine Jaouen	RN	Raphaël Arnault	NPA	No
Vaucluse	2nd	Bénédicte Auzanot	RN	Bénédicte Auzanot	RN	No
Vaucluse	3rd	Hervé de Lépinau	RN	Hervé de Lépinau	RN	Yes
Vaucluse	4th	Marie-France Lorho	RN	Marie-France Lorho	RN	No
Vaucluse	5th	Jean-François Lovisolo*	RE	Catherine Rimbert	RN	No
Vendée	1st	Philippe Latombe	MoDem	Philippe Latombe	MoDem	No
Vendée	2nd	Béatrice Bellamy	HOR	Béatrice Bellamy	HOR	No
Vendée	3rd	Stéphane Buchou	RE	Stéphane Buchou	RE	No
Vendée	4th	Véronique Besse	DVD	Véronique Besse	DVD	No
Vendée	5th	Pierre Henriet	HOR	Pierre Henriet	HOR	No
Vienne	1st	Lisa Belluco	LE	Lisa Belluco	LE	No
Vienne	2nd	Sacha Houlié	RE	Sacha Houlié	RE	No
Vienne	3rd	Pascal Lecamp	MoDem	Pascal Lecamp	MoDem	No
Vienne	4th	Nicolas Turquois	MoDem	Nicolas Turquois	MoDem	No
Haute-Vienne	1st	Damien Maudet	LFI	Damien Maudet	LFI	No
Haute-Vienne	2nd	Stéphane Delautrette	PS	Stéphane Delautrette	PS	No
Haute-Vienne	3rd	Manon Meunier	LFI	Manon Meunier	LFI	No
Vosges	1st	Stéphane Viry	LR	Stéphane Viry	LR	No
Vosges	2nd	David Valence	PR	Gaëtan Dussausaye	RN	No
Vosges	3rd	Christophe Naegelen	UDI	Christophe Naegelen	UDI	No
Vosges	4th	Jean-Jacques Gaultier	LR	Sébastien Humbert	RN	No
Yonne	1st	Daniel Grenon	RN	Daniel Grenon	RN	No
Yonne	2nd	André Villiers	HOR	Sophie-Laurence Roy	LR (UXD)	No
Yonne	3rd	Julien Odoul	RN	Julien Odoul	RN	Yes
Territoire de Belfort	1st	Ian Boucard	LR	Ian Boucard	LR	No
Territoire de Belfort	2nd	Florian Chauche	LFI	Guillaume Bigot	RN	No
Essonne	1st	Farida Amrani	LFI	Farida Amrani	LFI	No
Essonne	2nd	Nathalie Da Conceicao Carvalho	RN	Nathalie Da Conceicao Carvalho	RN	No
Essonne	3rd	Alexis Izard	RE	Steevy Gustave	LE	No
Essonne	4th	Marie-Pierre Rixain	RE	Marie-Pierre Rixain	RE	No
Essonne	5th	Paul Midy	RE	Paul Midy	RE	No
Essonne	6th	Jérôme Guedj	PS	Jérôme Guedj	PS	No
Essonne	7th	Robin Reda	RE	Claire Lejeune	LFI	No
Essonne	8th	Nicolas Dupont-Aignan	DLF	Bérenger Cernon	LFI	No
Essonne	9th	Éric Husson	RE	Julie Ozenne	LE	No
Essonne	10th	Antoine Léaument	LFI	Antoine Léaument	LFI	No
Hauts-de-Seine	1st	Elsa Faucillon	PCF	Elsa Faucillon	PCF	Yes
Hauts-de-Seine	2nd	Francesca Pasquini	G.s	Thomas Lam	LR	No
Hauts-de-Seine	3rd	Philippe Juvin	LR	Philippe Juvin	LR	Yes
Hauts-de-Seine	4th	Sabrina Sebaihi	LE	Sabrina Sebaihi	LE	No
Hauts-de-Seine	5th	Céline Calvez	RE	Céline Calvez	RE	No
Hauts-de-Seine	6th	Constance Le Grip	RE	Constance Le Grip	RE	No
Hauts-de-Seine	7th	Pierre Cazeneuve	RE	Pierre Cazeneuve	RE	Yes
Hauts-de-Seine	8th	Virginie Lanlo	UDI	Prisca Thevenot	RE	No
Hauts-de-Seine	9th	Emmanuel Pellerin*	RE	Stéphane Séjourné	RE	No
Hauts-de-Seine	10th	Claire Guichard	RE	Gabriel Attal	RE	No
Hauts-de-Seine	11th	Aurélien Saintoul	LFI	Aurélien Saintoul	LFI	Yes
Hauts-de-Seine	12th	Jean-Louis Bourlanges*	MoDem	Jean-Didier Berger	LR	No
Hauts-de-Seine	13th	Maud Bregeon	RE	Maud Bregeon	RE	No
Seine-Saint-Denis	1st	Éric Coquerel	LFI	Éric Coquerel	LFI	Yes
Seine-Saint-Denis	2nd	Stéphane Peu	PCF	Stéphane Peu	PCF	Yes
Seine-Saint-Denis	3rd	Thomas Portes	LFI	Thomas Portes	LFI	No
Seine-Saint-Denis	4th	Soumya Bourouaha	PCF	Soumya Bourouaha	PCF	No
Seine-Saint-Denis	5th	Raquel Garrido	LFI	Aly Diouara	LFI	No
Seine-Saint-Denis	6th	Bastien Lachaud	LFI	Bastien Lachaud	LFI	Yes
Seine-Saint-Denis	7th	Alexis Corbière	LFI	Alexis Corbière	LFI	No
Seine-Saint-Denis	8th	Fatiha Keloua-Hachi	PS	Fatiha Keloua-Hachi	PS	No
Seine-Saint-Denis	9th	Aurélie Trouvé	LFI	Aurélie Trouvé	LFI	Yes
Seine-Saint-Denis	10th	Nadège Abomangoli	LFI	Nadège Abomangoli	LFI	Yes
Seine-Saint-Denis	11th	Clémentine Autain	LFI	Clémentine Autain	LFI	Yes
Seine-Saint-Denis	12th	Jérôme Legavre	POI	Jérôme Legavre	POI	No
Val-de-Marne	1st	Frédéric Descrozaille	RE	Sylvain Berrios	LR	No
Val-de-Marne	2nd	Clémence Guetté	LFI	Clémence Guetté	LFI	Yes
Val-de-Marne	3rd	Louis Boyard	LFI	Louis Boyard	LFI	No
Val-de-Marne	4th	Maud Petit	MoDem	Maud Petit	MoDem	No
Val-de-Marne	5th	Mathieu Lefèvre	RE	Mathieu Lefèvre	RE	No
Val-de-Marne	6th	Guillaume Gouffier Valente	RE	Guillaume Gouffier Valente	RE	No
Val-de-Marne	7th	Rachel Keke	LFI	Vincent Jeanbrun	LR	No
Val-de-Marne	8th	Michel Herbillon	LR	Michel Herbillon	LR	No
Val-de-Marne	9th	Isabelle Santiago	PS	Isabelle Santiago	PS	Yes
Val-de-Marne	10th	Mathilde Panot	LFI	Mathilde Panot	LFI	Yes
Val-de-Marne	11th	Sophie Taillé-Polian	G.s	Sophie Taillé-Polian	G.s	Yes
Val-d'Oise	1st	Émilie Chandler	RE	Anne Sicard	RN	No
Val-d'Oise	2nd	Guillaume Vuilletet	RE	Ayda Hadizadeh	PS	No
Val-d'Oise	3rd	Cécile Rilhac	RE	Emmanuel Maurel	GRS	No
Val-d'Oise	4th	Naïma Moutchou	HOR	Naïma Moutchou	HOR	No
Val-d'Oise	5th	Paul Vannier	LFI	Paul Vannier	LFI	Yes
Val-d'Oise	6th	Estelle Folest	RR	Gabrielle Cathala	LFI	No
Val-d'Oise	7th	Dominique Da Silva	RE	Romain Eskenazi	PS	No
Val-d'Oise	8th	Carlos Martens Bilongo	LFI	Carlos Martens Bilongo	LFI	Yes
Val-d'Oise	9th	Arnaud Le Gall	LFI	Arnaud Le Gall	LFI	No
Val-d'Oise	10th	Aurélien Taché	LFI	Aurélien Taché	LFI	No
Guadeloupe	1st	Olivier Serva	DVG	Olivier Serva	DVG	No
Guadeloupe	2nd	Christian Baptiste	PPDG	Christian Baptiste	PPDG	No
Guadeloupe	3rd	Max Mathiasin	DVG	Max Mathiasin	DVG	No
Guadeloupe	4th	Élie Califer	FGPS	Élie Califer	FGPS	No
Martinique	1st	Jiovanny William	Péyi-A	Jiovanny William	Péyi-A	No
Martinique	2nd	Marcellin Nadeau	Péyi-A	Marcellin Nadeau	Péyi-A	No
Martinique	3rd	Johnny Hajjar	PPM	Béatrice Bellay	FSM	No
Martinique	4th	Jean-Philippe Nilor	Péyi-A	Jean-Philippe Nilor	Péyi-A	No
French Guiana	1st	Jean-Victor Castor	MDES	Jean-Victor Castor	MDES	No
French Guiana	2nd	Davy Rimane	PLD	Davy Rimane	PLD	No
Réunion	1st	Philippe Naillet	PS	Philippe Naillet	PS	No
Réunion	2nd	Karine Lebon	PLR	Karine Lebon	PLR	No
Réunion	3rd	Nathalie Bassire	DVD	Joseph Rivière	RN	No
Réunion	4th	Emeline K/Bidi	LP	Emeline K/Bidi	LP	No
Réunion	5th	Jean-Hugues Ratenon	LFI	Jean-Hugues Ratenon	LFI	No
Réunion	6th	Frédéric Maillot	PLR	Frédéric Maillot	PLR	No
Réunion	7th	Perceval Gaillard	LFI	Perceval Gaillard	LFI	No
Mayotte	1st	Estelle Youssouffa	DVD	Estelle Youssouffa	DVD	Yes
Mayotte	2nd	Mansour Kamardine	LR	Anchya Bamana	RN	No
New Caledonia	1st	Philippe Dunoyer	CE	Nicolas Metzdorf	GNC	No
New Caledonia	2nd	Nicolas Metzdorf	GNC	Emmanuel Tjibaou	UC	No
French Polynesia	1st	Tematai Le Gayic	Tavini	Moerani Frébault	Tapura	Yes
French Polynesia	2nd	Steve Chailloux	Tavini	Nicole Sanquer	AHIP	No
French Polynesia	3rd	Mereana Reid Arbelot	Tavini	Mereana Reid Arbelot	Tavini	No
Saint Barthélemy and Saint Martin	1st	Frantz Gumbs	RSM	Frantz Gumbs	RSM	No
Saint Pierre and Miquelon	1st	Stéphane Lenormand	AD	Stéphane Lenormand	AD	No
Wallis and Futuna	1st	Mikaele Seo	RE	Mikaele Seo	RE	Yes
French residents overseas	1st	Christopher Weissberg	RE	Roland Lescure	RE	No
French residents overseas	2nd	Éléonore Caroit	RE	Éléonore Caroit	RE	No
French residents overseas	3rd	Alexandre Holroyd*	RE	Vincent Caure	RE	No
French residents overseas	4th	Pieyre-Alexandre Anglade	RE	Pieyre-Alexandre Anglade	RE	No
French residents overseas	5th	Stéphane Vojetta	DVC	Stéphane Vojetta	DVC	No
French residents overseas	6th	Marc Ferracci	RE	Marc Ferracci	RE	No
French residents overseas	7th	Frédéric Petit	MoDem	Frédéric Petit	MoDem	No
French residents overseas	8th	Meyer Habib	UDI	Caroline Yadan	RE	No
French residents overseas	9th	Karim Ben Cheïkh	G.s	Karim Ben Cheïkh	G.s	No
French residents overseas	10th	Amal Amélia Lakrafi	RE	Amal Amélia Lakrafi	RE	No
French residents overseas	11th	Anne Genetet	RE	Anne Genetet	RE	No
