= List of presidents of the Regional Council of Rhône-Alpes =

This is the list of presidents of the Regional Council of Rhône-Alpes from its establishment in 1974 to its abolition on 31 December 2015.. French regional councils have been directly elected since 1986. On 1 January 2016 the Regional Council of Rhône-Alpes was succeeded by the Regional Council of Auvergne-Rhône-Alpes.

== List ==
Presidents of the Regional Council of Rhône-Alpes
President	Party	Term
Paul Ribeyre	RI	1974–1980
Michel Durafour	UDF	1980–1981
Charles Béraudier	UDF–CDS	1978–1986
Charles Millon	UDF–PR	1988–1999
Anne-Marie Comparini	UDF	1999–2004
Jean-Jack Queyranne	PS	2004–2015

== See also ==
- Politics of Rhône-Alpes
