= Bernadette Isaac-Sibille =

French politician (1930–2021)

Mayor of the 5th arrondissement of Lyon
- In office 1983–1989

General Councillor for the Canton of Lyon-V
- In office 1985–2004

Member of the French National Assembly for Rhône's 1st constituency
- In office 12 June 1988 – 18 June 2002
- Succeeded by: Anne-Marie Comparini

Personal details
- Born: 30 March 1930 Lyon, France
- Died: 2 January 2021 (aged 90)
- Party: UDF

Bernadette Isaac-Sibille (30 March 1930 – 2 January 2021) was a French politician.

== Career ==
Isaac-Sibille was elected Mayor of the 5th arrondissement of Lyon in 1983. She served as a municipal councillor until her resignation in 1995. In 1999, she resigned from the Union for French Democracy to challenge Anne-Marie Comparini as President of the Regional council of Rhône-Alpes in place of Charles Millon. In the 2001 French municipal elections, she was defeated by Alexandrine Pesson by a margin of 50.73% to 49.27%.

In the 1985 French cantonal elections, Isaac-Sibille ran for the Canton of Lyon-V, defeating candidates from the Socialist Party and National Front. She was re-elected in 1992 and 1998.

Isaac-Sibille was elected to the National Assembly in 1988 to represent Rhône's 1st constituency, defeating the Socialist Party's Gérard Collomb. She was re-elected in 1993 with 70.65% of the vote. She defeated Collomb again in 1997. In 2002, Anne-Marie Comparini was chosen to represent the Union for French Democracy. Therefore, Isaac-Sibille represented the Miscellaneous right, but only received 12.10% of the vote in the first round. She refused to support Comparini, citing a "betrayal" in 1999.

In 2003, Isaac-Sibille became a member of the Commission de surveillance et de contrôle des publications destinées à l'enfance et à l'adolescence. She also served as president of the association for the Médaille de la Famille française.

== Personal life ==
Born Bernadette Sibille, she married Alain Isaac on 14 January 1957, and they remained together until his death in April 2017. They had four children, including Democratic Movement politician Cyrille Isaac-Sibille. Isaac-Sibille died on 2 January 2021 at the age of 90.
