= Politics of Rhône-Alpes =

The politics of Rhône-Alpes, France takes place in a framework of a presidential representative democracy, whereby the President of Regional Council is the head of government, and of a pluriform multi-party system. Legislative power is vested in the regional council.

== Executive ==
The executive of the region is led by the President of the regional council.

=== List of presidents ===
Presidents of Rhône-Alpes
President	Party	Term
Paul Ribeyre	RI	1974-1980
Michel Durafour	UDF	1980-1981
Charles Béraudier	UDF-CDS	1978-1986
Charles Millon	UDF-PR	1988-1999
Anne-Marie Comparini	UDF	1999-2004
Jean-Jack Queyranne	PS	2004-

== Legislative branch ==
The Regional Council of Rhône-Alpes (Conseil régional de Rhône-Alpes) is composed of 157 councillors, elected by proportional representation in a two-round system. The winning list in the second round is automatically entitled to a quarter of the seats. The remainder of the seats are allocated through proportional representation with a 5% threshold.

The Council is elected for a six-year term.

=== Current composition ===
As of 2009.

Party		seats
•	Socialist Party	47
	Union for a Popular Movement	24
•	The Greens	20
	National Front	18
•	French Communist Party	15
	MoDem	11
•	Left Radical Party	7
	Radical-UMP	5
	New Centre	5
	Left Party	4
	New Anticapitalist Party	1

== Elections ==
=== Other elections ===
In the 2007 legislative election, the UMP won 32 seats, while the opposition PS won 14. The New Centre won one seat, as did the Communist Party. A right-wing independent won one seat in Haute-Savoie.
