= Michel Debout =

French politician (1945–2024)

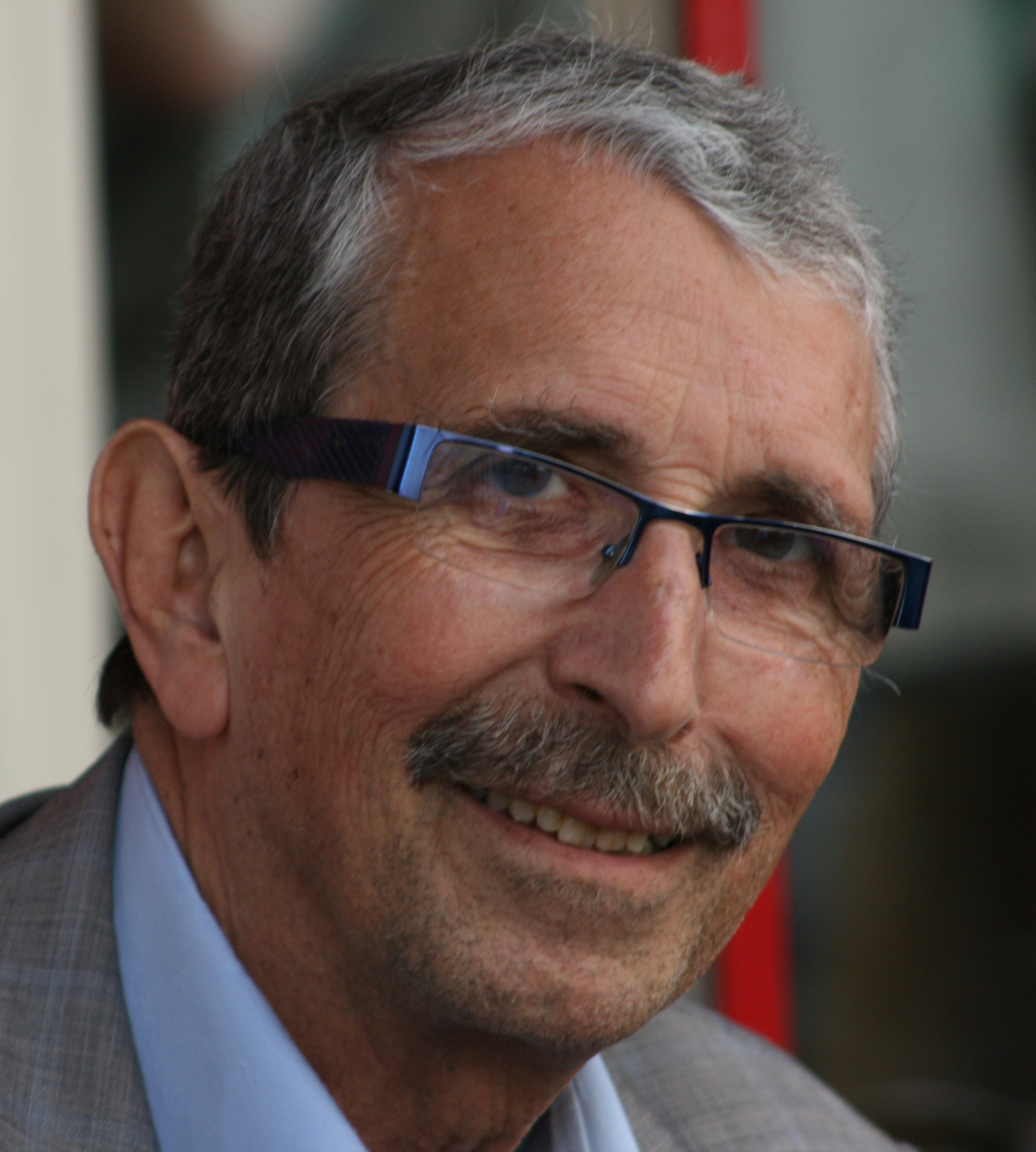
- Debout in 2012

Member of the Regional Council of Rhône-Alpes
- In office 1986–1998

Member of the French Economic, Social and Environmental Council

Personal details
- Born: 10 July 1945 Thonon-les-Bains, France
- Died: 18 November 2024 (aged 79)
- Party: PS
- Education: University of Lyon
- Occupation: Doctor

Michel Debout (10 July 1945 – 18 November 2024) was a French doctor and politician of the Socialist Party (PS). He taught medical law in Saint-Étienne from 1980 to 2010.

== Life and career ==
Born in Thonon-les-Bains on 10 July 1945, Debout studied medicine at the University of Lyon, from where he graduated in 1970. In 1980, he became a professor of medical law at the Centre hospitalier universitaire de Saint-Étienne and served on the Conseil Supérieur de Médecine Légale, the Conseil National des Universités, Conseil National d’Aide aux Victimes, and the Haut Conseil de Santé Publique. His research guided him to issues of societal health issues, such as suicide and harassment in the workplace. He co-wrote the "Appel des 44" alongside Jean-Claude Delgènes, which advocated for the creation of a suicide observatory committee.

Debout joined the PS in 1973 and unsuccessfully ran for a seat in the National Assembly. In 1986, he was elected to the Regional Council of Rhône-Alpes and was re-elected in 1992. He also held various positions within the party, such as membership in its National Council and service as the National Secretary. Additionally, he served on the French Economic, Social and Environmental Council.

Debout died on 18 November 2024, at the age of 79.

== Publications ==
- Psychiatrie d’urgence, médecine de la crise (1981)
- Le désordre médical (1986)
- Avis et rapport du Conseil Économique et Social (1993)
- Le suicide (1996)
- Travail, Violences, Environnement
- Le harcèlement moral au travail (1999)
- La France du suicide (2002)
- Violences au travail (2003)
- Prévenir la maltraitance envers les personnes âgées (2003)
- Science et mythologie du mort (2006)
- Socialiste, allons voir si la Gauche (2006)
- Risques psycho-sociaux au travail : vraie question et bonnes réponses (2008)
- Tout doit disparaître, travail et souffrances psychologiques (2009)
- Traité de Médecine Légale et de droit de la santé (2010)
- Les sept chantiers capitaux (2011)
- Engagé ! (2011)
- Suicide, un tabou français (2012)
- Éloge de la dette (2013)
- Le traumatisme du chômage (2015)

=== Collective works ===
- L'état de l'opinion 2001 présenté (2002)
- Dictionnaire critique de Sciences Criminelles (2004)
- Évaluation de programmes en prévention du suicide (2004)
- Le suicide et sa prévention, émergence du concept, actualité des programmes (2005)
- Risques psychosociaux au travail (2011)
- Travail: mode(s) d'emploi (2012)
- Résilience et relations humaines (2014)
