= The Right (France) =

The Right (French: La Droite) is a political party in France founded in April 1998 as a political movement by former Defence Minister Charles Millon. This came following his expulsion from the Union for French Democracy (UDF) due to the alliance he formed with the National Front (FN), which allowed him to win reelection as President of the Regional Council of Rhône-Alpes. Some of the most prominent French conservative right-wingers at the time, such as Michel Junot, Claude Reichman, Jean-François Touzé, Alain Griotteray and Michel Poniatowski, were present at the creation of the movement.

After the failure of Millon's project to merge La Droite into Charles Pasqua's Rassemblement pour la France (RPF) and the Centre national des indépendants et paysans (CNI), Millon founded the Liberal Christian Right (Droite libérale-chrétienne, DLC) as a party in October 1999. However, most members of La Droite refused to join the new party; only three deputies, including Millon, joined. Two of these deputies (including Millon in the 7th constituency of Rhône) were defeated at the 2002 legislative election while the third did not run.

In September 2003, Millon was named the French ambassador to the Food and Agriculture Organization (FAO) of the United Nations, while the Millonist group in the Rhône-Alpes Regional Council (Oui à Rhône-Alpes, ORA) merged with that of the Union for a Popular Movement (UMP) liberal-conservative party, led by Nicolas Sarkozy. The DLC was therefore put in stand-by although it officially continued to exist.

== See also ==
- List of political parties in France
