= Maine-et-Loire's 7th constituency =

Constituency of the National Assembly of France

7th constituency of Maine-et-Loire
- inline Constituency of the National Assembly of France

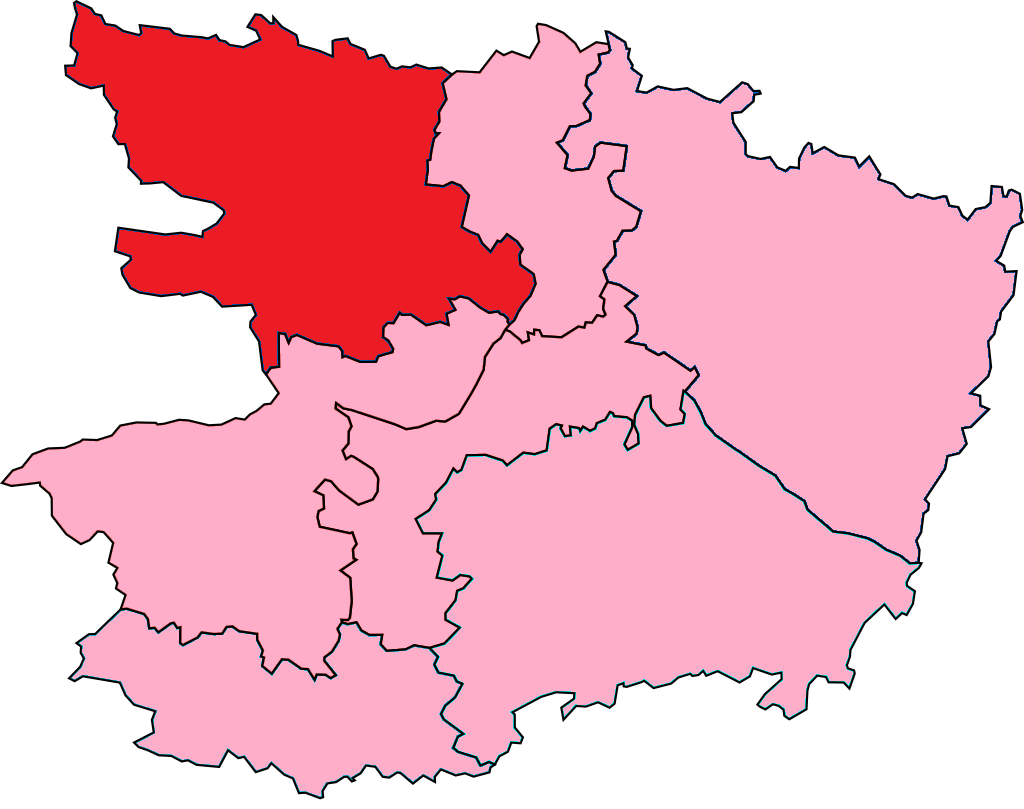
- Maine-et-Loire's 7th Constituency shown within Maine-et-Loire
- Deputy: Philippe Bolo; MoDem
- Department: Maine-et-Loire
- Cantons: Angers Nord, Angers Nord-Ouest, Candé, Le Lion-d'Angers, Le Louroux-Béconnais, Pouancé, Segré
- Registered voters: 77820

The 7th constituency of Maine-et-Loire (French: Septième circonscription de Maine-et-Loire) is a French legislative constituency in the Maine-et-Loire département. Like the other 576 French constituencies, it elects one MP using a two round electoral system.

== Description ==
The 7th Constituency of Maine-et-Loire is situated in the north west of the department, including the north and north-western suburbs of Angers.

In common with other several seats in Maine-et-Loire for example the 1st, 5th and 6th this constituency had a long tradition of supporting centre right candidates. This tradition was broken at the 2017 election with the election of the MoDem candidate, during which election the conservative The Republicans party secured just 38% of the second round vote.

== Assembly members ==
Election	Member	Party
1988	Marc Laffineur	UDF
1993	Marc Laffineur	UDF
1997	Marc Laffineur	UDF
2002	Marc Laffineur	UMP
2007	Joseph Bosse	UMP
2012	Marc Laffineur	UMP
2017	Philippe Bolo	MoDem
2022	Philippe Bolo	MoDem

== Election results ==
=== 2024 ===
Candidate	Party	Alliance	First round		Second round	
Candidate	Party	Alliance	Votes	%	Votes	%
Philippe Bolo	MoDem	Ensemble	19,541	33.86	24,319	41.73
Guillaume Jouanneau	PS	NPF	16,778	29.07	16,576	28.44
Clémence Lascaud	RN		15,802	27.38	17,389	29.83
Sandrine Boullais-Challier	LR		3,320	5.75		
Céline L'Huillier	LO		810	1.40		
Régis Crespin	DLF	DSV	750	1.30		
Valérie Gorioux	R!		715	1.24		
Raphaël de la Salmonière	IND	DVD	0	0.00		
Valid votes			57,716	96.90	58,284	97.38
Blank votes			1,305	2.19	1,158	1.93
Null votes			544	0.91	411	0.69
Turnout			59,565	70.50	59,853	70.83
Abstentions			24,926	29.50	24,644	329.17
Registered voters			84,491		84,497	
Result			MoDEM HOLD			

=== 2022 ===
Legislative Election 2022: Maine-et-Loire's 7th constituency
Party	Candidate	Votes	%	±%
MoDem (Ensemble)	Philippe Bolo	16,333	40.81	-0.81
PS (NUPÉS)	Guillaume Jouanneau	12,136	30.32	+5.41
RN	Aurore Lahondes	6,039	15.09	+6.43
REC	Barbara Mazieres	1,654	4.13	N/A
DVE	Abderrazak Guerbaa	1,375	3.44	N/A
LMR	Stéphane Trottier	976	2.44	N/A
DLF (UPF)	Régis Crespin	875	2.19	N/A
LO	Celine L'Huillier	634	1.58	N/A
Turnout		40,022	49.69	−3.18
2nd round result
MoDem (Ensemble)	Philippe Bolo	20,865	55.56	-6.86
PS (NUPÉS)	Guillaume Jouanneau	16,692	44.44	N/A
Turnout		37,557	48.19	+8.59
MoDem hold				

=== 2017 ===
Legislative Election 2017: Maine-et-Loire's 7th constituency
Party	Candidate	Votes	%	±%
MoDem	Philippe Bolo	17,126	41.62	
LR	Étienne Glémot	8,398	20.41	
LFI	Olivier Dupuis	4,736	11.51	
FN	Aurore Lahondes	3,563	8.66	
PS	Silvia Camara-Tombini	3,262	7.93	
EELV	Hervé Dubosclard	2,252	5.47	
Others	N/A	1,809		
Turnout		41,146	52.87	
2nd round result
MoDem	Philippe Bolo	19,235	62.42	
LR	Étienne Glémot	11,581	37.58	
Turnout		30,816	39.60	
MoDem gain from LR				

=== 2012 ===
Legislative Election 2012: Maine-et-Loire's 7th constituency
Party	Candidate	Votes	%	±%
UMP	Marc Laffineur	17,944	39.86	
PS	Silvia Camara-Tombini	15,941	35.41	
FN	Marie Courtin	4,425	9.83	
EELV	Romain Laveau	2,278	5.06	
AC	Christian Baron	1,883	4.18	
FG	Stéphanie Dupeyroux	1,559	3.46	
Others	N/A	990		
Turnout		45,020	59.78	
2nd round result
UMP	Marc Laffineur	21,885	50.10	
PS	Silvia Camara-Tombini	21,800	49.90	
Turnout		43,685	57.99	
UMP hold				
