= Cyrille Isaac-Sibille =

French politician (born 1958)

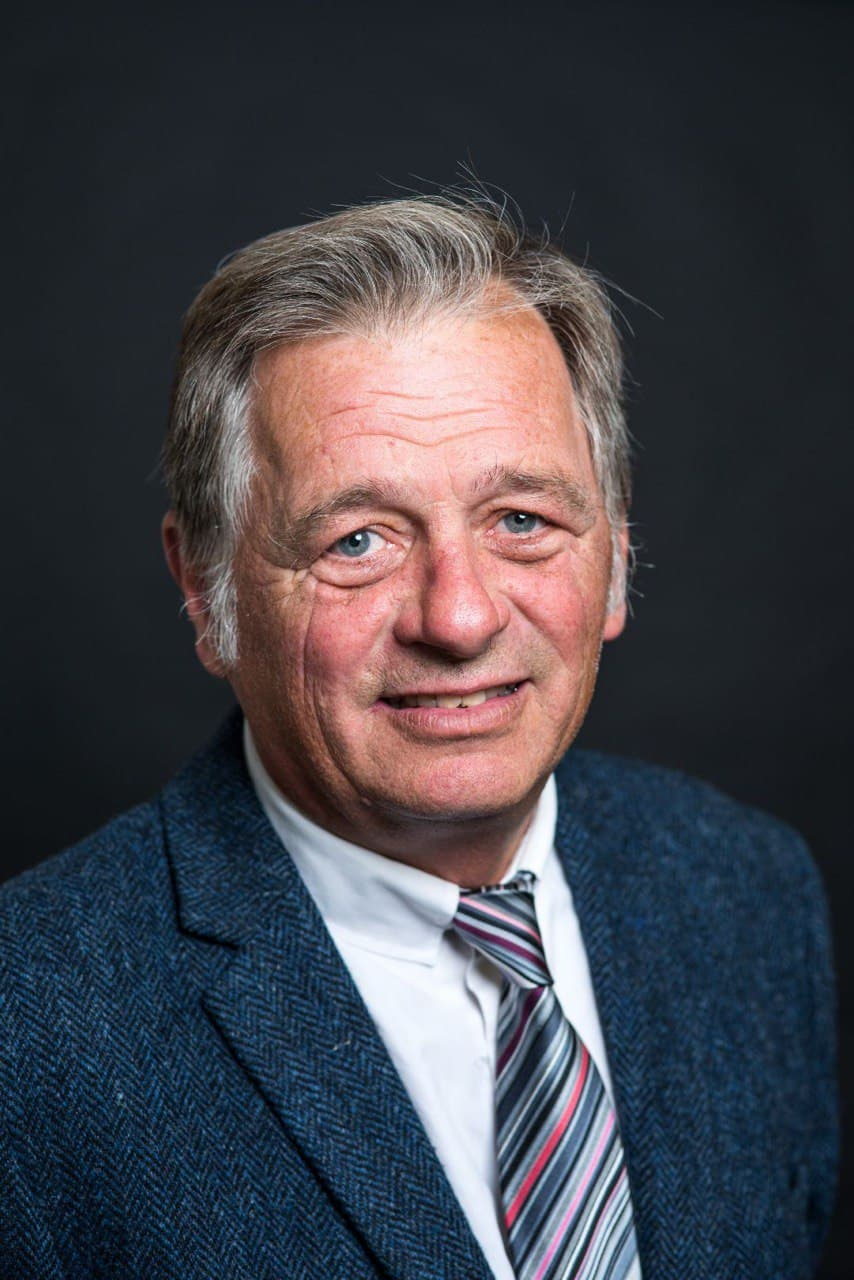

Member of the National Assembly for Rhône's 12th constituency
- Incumbent
- Assumed office 21 June 2017
- Preceded by: Michel Terrot

Personal details
- Born: 30 April 1958 (age 68) Lyon, France
- Party: Democratic Movement
- Parent: Bernadette Isaac-Sibille (mother)
- Education: Claude Bernard University Lyon 1
- Profession: Otorhinolaryngologist

Cyrille Isaac-Sibille (French pronunciation: [siʁil izaksibil]; born 30 April 1958) is a French politician of the Democratic Movement (MoDem) who has represented the 12th constituency of Rhône in the National Assembly since 2017. He previously served as Deputy Mayor of Sainte-Foy-lès-Lyon from 1995 to 2008. He is an otorhinolaryngologist by occupation.

Isaac-Sibille ran unsuccessfully twice in Rhône's 12th constituency in 2007 and 2012, placing third and fifth in the first round respectively. In 2017 he won the seat with 56.2% of the second-round vote after incumbent Michel Terrot of The Republicans declined to run for an eight term in office. He was re-elected in 2022 and 2024 with 62.9% and 38.7% with the second-round vote, the latter in a triangular election, respectively. In Parliament, he sits on the Committee on Social Affairs.

== Personal life ==
He is the son of Bernadette Isaac-Sibille (1930–2021), a former mayor of the 5th arrondissement of Lyon and deputy for Rhône's 1st constituency.
