= Thierry Braillard =

French politician (born 1964)

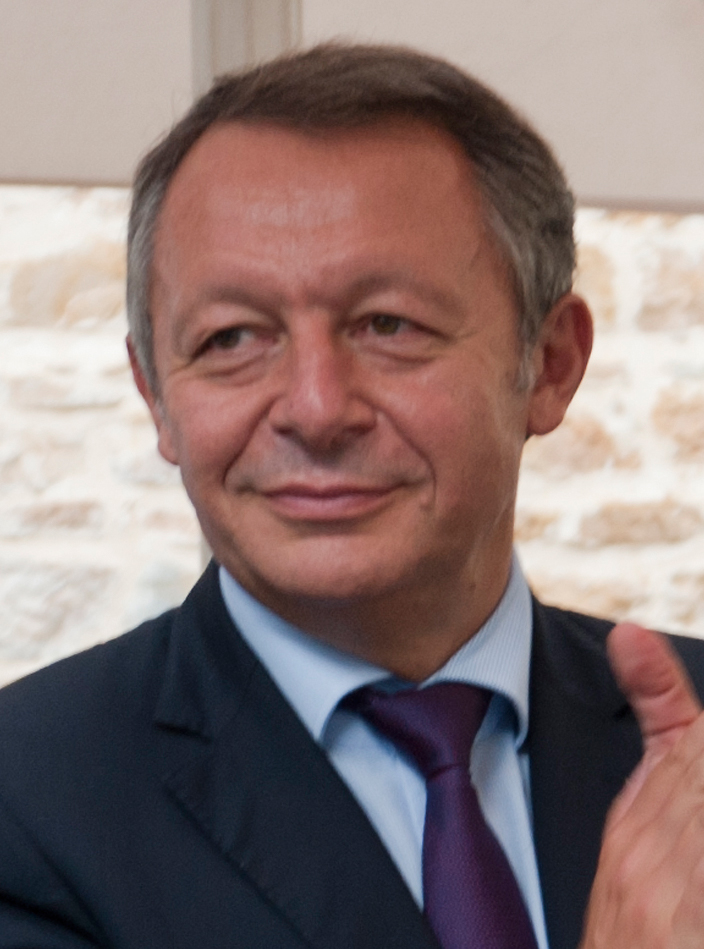
- Braillard in 2014

Member of the French National Assembly for Rhône's 1st constituency
- In office 17 June 2017 – 20 June 2017
- Preceded by: Gilda Hobert
- Succeeded by: Thomas Rudigoz
- In office 20 June 2012 – 9 May 2014
- Preceded by: Michel Havard
- Succeeded by: Gilda Hobert

Personal details
- Born: 24 January 1964 (age 62)
- Party: Radical Party of the Left

Thierry Braillard (born 24 January 1964) is a French politician. From 2014 to 2017, he served as secretary of state for sports. From 2012 to 2014, he was a member of the National Assembly.
