= Rhône's 12th constituency =

Constituency of the National Assembly of France

12th constituency of Rhône
- inline Constituency of the National Assembly of France

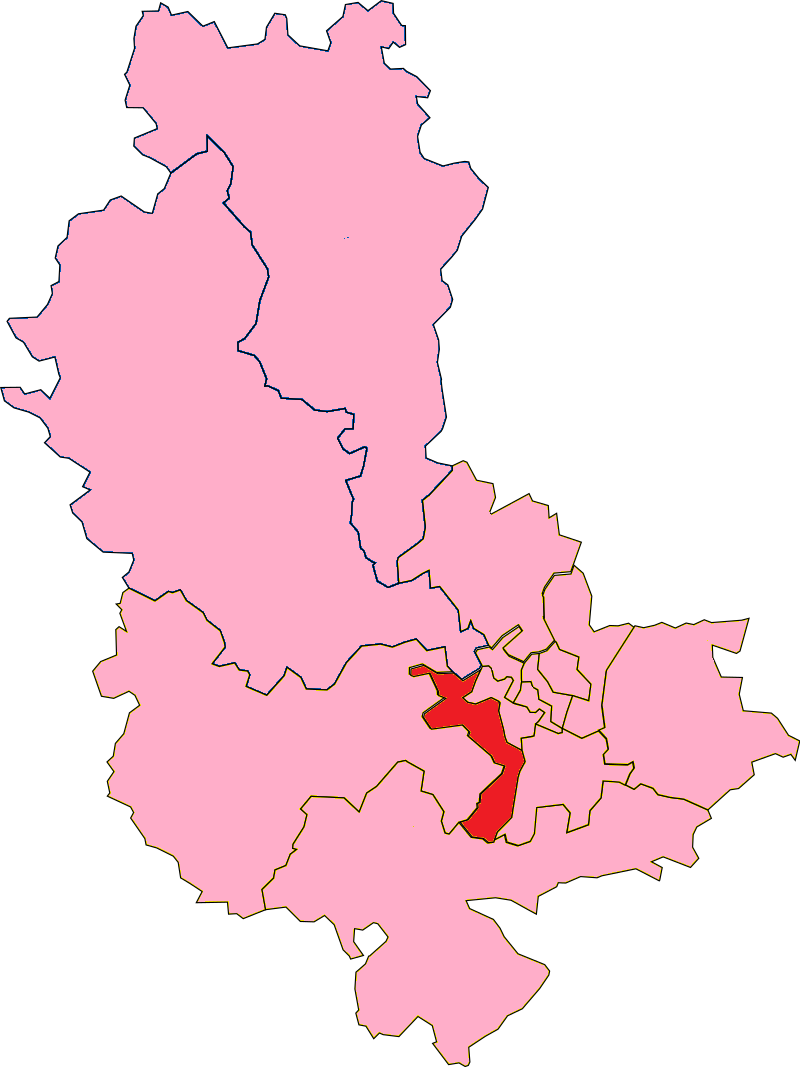
- Rhône's's 12th Constituency shown within the Rhône
- Deputy: Cyrille Isaac-Sibille; MoDem
- Department: Rhône
- Cantons: Irigny, Oullins, Sainte-Foy-lès-Lyon, Tassin-la-Demi-Lune
- Registered voters: 79783

The 12th constituency of the Rhône (French: Douzième circonscription du Rhône) is a French legislative constituency in the Rhône département. Like the other 576 French constituencies, it elects one MP using a two round electoral system.

== Description ==
The 12th constituency of the Rhône lies to the west of Lyon hugging the river Rhône. The towns that make up this seat are interconnected suburbs of Lyon. Since 2015 this constituency has been part of the Lyon Metropolis and therefore outside of the Rhône for administrative purposes.

Between 1988 and 2017 the seat was held by conservative Michel Terrot before the seat fell to the MoDems as part of the pro Emmanuel Macron centrist coalition.

== Assembly Members ==
| Election | Member | Party |
|---|---|---|
| 1988 | Michel Terrot | RPR |
| 1993 | Michel Terrot | RPR |
| 1997 | Michel Terrot | RPR |
| 2002 | Michel Terrot | UMP |
| 2007 | Michel Terrot | UMP |
| 2012 | Michel Terrot | UMP |
| 2017 | Cyrille Isaac-Sibille | MoDem |
| 2022 | Cyrille Isaac-Sibille | MoDem |
| 2024 | Cyrille Isaac-Sibille | MoDem |

== Election results ==
=== 2024 ===
Legislative Election 2024: Rhône's 12th constituency
| Party | Candidate | Votes | % | ±% |
|---|---|---|---|---|
| RN | Clémence Luisier | 14,989 | 24.98 | +14.43 |
| LR | Pascal Charmot | 8,341 | 13.90 | −8.18 |
| LÉ–EELV (NFP) | Lucie Gaillot-Durand | 18,039 | 30.06 | +7.03 |
| MoDem (Ensemble) | Cyrille Isaac-Sibille | 17,333 | 28.88 | −1.82 |
| REC | Noémie Gallice | 732 | 1.22 | −4.97 |
| LO | Cécile Faurite | 576 | 0.96 | N/A |
| Turnout | | 60,010 | 98.62 | +44.88 |
| Registered electors | | 82,747 | | |
2nd round result
| MoDem | Cyrille Isaac-Sibille | 23,200 | 38.79 | −24.13 |
| LÉ–EELV | Lucie Gaillot-Durand | 19,938 | 33.33 | −3.75 |
| RN | Clémence Luisier | 16,678 | 27.88 | N/A |
| Turnout | | 59,816 | 98.19 | +48.14 |
| Registered electors | | 82,772 | | |
| MoDem hold | | Swing | | |

=== 2022 ===
Legislative Election 2022: Rhone's 12th constituency
| Party | Candidate | Votes | % | ±% |
|---|---|---|---|---|
| MoDem (Ensemble) | Cyrille Isaac-Sibille | 13,413 | 30.70 | -11.22 |
| EELV (NUPÉS) | Jean-François Baudin | 10,063 | 23.03 | +0.76 |
| LR (UDC) | Jérôme Moroge | 9,647 | 22.08 | −0.37 |
| RN | Elodie Annani | 4,611 | 10.55 | +1.71 |
| REC | Olivier Pirra | 2,704 | 6.19 | N/A |
| PS | Arthur Chambon* | 1,341 | 3.07 | N/A |
| Others | N/A | 1,910 | - | − |
| Turnout | | 43,689 | 53.74 | +1.69 |
2nd round result
| MoDem (Ensemble) | Cyrille Isaac-Sibille | 24,244 | 62.92 | +6.67 |
| EELV (NUPÉS) | Jean-François Baudin | 14,290 | 37.08 | N/A |
| Turnout | | 38,534 | 50.05 | +9.99 |
| MoDem hold | | | | |

* Chambon ran as a PS dissident without the support of the party or the NUPES alliance.

=== 2017 ===
Legislative Election 2017: Rhône's 12th constituency
| Party | Candidate | Votes | % | ±% |
|---|---|---|---|---|
| MoDem | Cyrille Isaac-Sibille | 17,410 | 41.92 | |
| LR | Jérôme Moroge | 9,325 | 22.45 | |
| LFI | Elio Navarro | 4,114 | 9.91 | |
| FN | Muriel Coativy | 3,671 | 8.84 | |
| EELV | Hélène Dromain | 2,398 | 5.77 | |
| PS | David Chizat | 1,996 | 4.81 | |
| Others | N/A | 2,614 | | |
| Turnout | | 41,528 | 52.05 | |
2nd round result
| MoDem | Cyrille Isaac-Sibille | 17,977 | 56.25 | |
| LR | Jérôme Moroge | 13,981 | 43.75 | |
| Turnout | | 31,958 | 40.06 | |
| MoDem gain from LR | | | | |

=== 2012 ===
Legislative Election 2012: Rhône's 12th constituency
| Party | Candidate | Votes | % | ±% |
|---|---|---|---|---|
| UMP | Michel Terrot | 17,827 | 39.11 | |
| PS | Joëlle Sechaud | 14,516 | 31.85 | |
| FN | Muriel Coativy | 5,526 | 12.12 | |
| FG | Daniel Deleaz | 2,365 | 5.19 | |
| MoDem | Cyrille Isaac-Sibille | 2,324 | 5.10 | |
| EELV | Cyril Kretzschmar | 1,959 | 4.30 | |
| Others | N/A | 1,060 | | |
| Turnout | | 45,577 | 59.84 | |
2nd round result
| UMP | Michel Terrot | 23,439 | 54.69 | |
| PS | Joëlle Sechaud | 19,422 | 45.31 | |
| Turnout | | 42,861 | 56.27 | |
| UMP hold | | | | |

=== 2007 ===
Legislative Election 2007: Rhône's 12th constituency
| Party | Candidate | Votes | % | ±% |
|---|---|---|---|---|
| UMP | Michel Terrot | 22,125 | 49.12 | |
| PS | Gilles Pommateau | 9,449 | 20.98 | |
| MoDem | Cyrille Isaac-Sibille | 5,915 | 13.13 | |
| PCF | Serge Tarassioux | 1,675 | 3.72 | |
| FN | Annie Torrent | 1,599 | 3.55 | |
| LV | Chantal Kerlan | 1,399 | 3.11 | |
| Far left | Maxime Pierot | 1,010 | 2.24 | |
| Others | N/A | 1,871 | | |
| Turnout | | 45,449 | 61.44 | |
2nd round result
| UMP | Michel Terrot | 24,580 | 58.99 | |
| PS | Gilles Pommateau | 17,090 | 41.01 | |
| Turnout | | 42,561 | 57.48 | |
| UMP hold | | | | |

=== 2002 ===
Legislative Election 2002: Rhône's 12th constituency
| Party | Candidate | Votes | % | ±% |
|---|---|---|---|---|
| UMP | Michel Terrot | 22,962 | 50.19 | |
| PS | Rene Lambert | 12,703 | 27.77 | |
| FN | Pierre Lahbari | 4,979 | 10.88 | |
| PCF | Jean Chambon | 1,483 | 3.24 | |
| DVE | Bertrand Caroline | 1,016 | 2.22 | |
| Others | N/A | 2,607 | | |
| Turnout | | 46,292 | 67.22 | |
| UMP hold | | | | |

=== 1997 ===
Legislative Election 1997: Rhône's 12th constituency
| Party | Candidate | Votes | % | ±% |
|---|---|---|---|---|
| RPR | Michel Terrot | 15,071 | 34.67 | |
| PS | René Lambert | 9,859 | 22.68 | |
| FN | Alain Chavalier | 6,790 | 15.62 | |
| PCF | Mireille Elmalan | 3,564 | 8.20 | |
| LV | Alain Veysset | 1,769 | 4.07 | |
| DIV | Christian Odemard | 1,721 | 3.96 | |
| DVD | Jean Aubin | 1,346 | 3.10 | |
| LO | Francis Faucher | 1,019 | 2.34 | |
| GE | Alexandrine Berthel | 923 | 2.12 | |
| Others | N/A | 1,412 | | |
| Turnout | | 47,543 | 67.16 | |
2nd round result
| RPR | Michel Terrot | 25,134 | 55.47 | |
| PS | René Lambert | 20,177 | 44.53 | |
| Turnout | | 47,543 | 71.17 | |
| RPR hold | | | | |
