= Michel Havard =

French politician (born 1967)

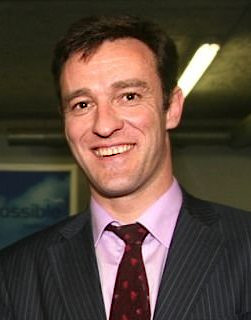
- Member of the National Assembly for Rhône's 1st constituency

Member of the National Assembly for Rhône's 1st constituency
- In office 2007–2012
- Preceded by: Anne-Marie Comparini
- Succeeded by: Thierry Braillard

Personal details
- Born: 24 March 1967 (age 59) Clermont-Ferrand, France
- Party: The Republicans
- Education: Sciences Po Lyon

Michel Havard (born 24 March 1967) is a member of the National Assembly of France. He represents the Rhône department, and is a member of The Republicans.
