= Thomas Rudigoz =

French politician

Deputy of the National Assembly for Rhône's 1st constituency
- In office 21 June 2017 – 9 June 2024
- Preceded by: Thierry Braillard
- Succeeded by: Anaïs Belouassa-Cherifi

Personal details
- Born: 11 January 1971 (age 54); Lyon, France
- Political party: Renaissance (2017-present); UDF (1999-2007); MoDem (2007-2017)

Thomas Rudigoz (born 11 January 1971) is a French politician representing La République En Marche!.

== Biography ==
Prior to entering politics, he began a career as a journalist first at Le Progrès prior to working for Radio Chrétienne Francophone (RCF). He was elected to the French National Assembly on 18 June 2017, representing Rhône's 1st constituency. He was re-elected in the 2022 election but lost his seat at the 2024 French legislative election.

== See also ==
- 2017 French legislative election
- 2022 French legislative election
