= Catherine Rimbert =

French politician (born 1968)

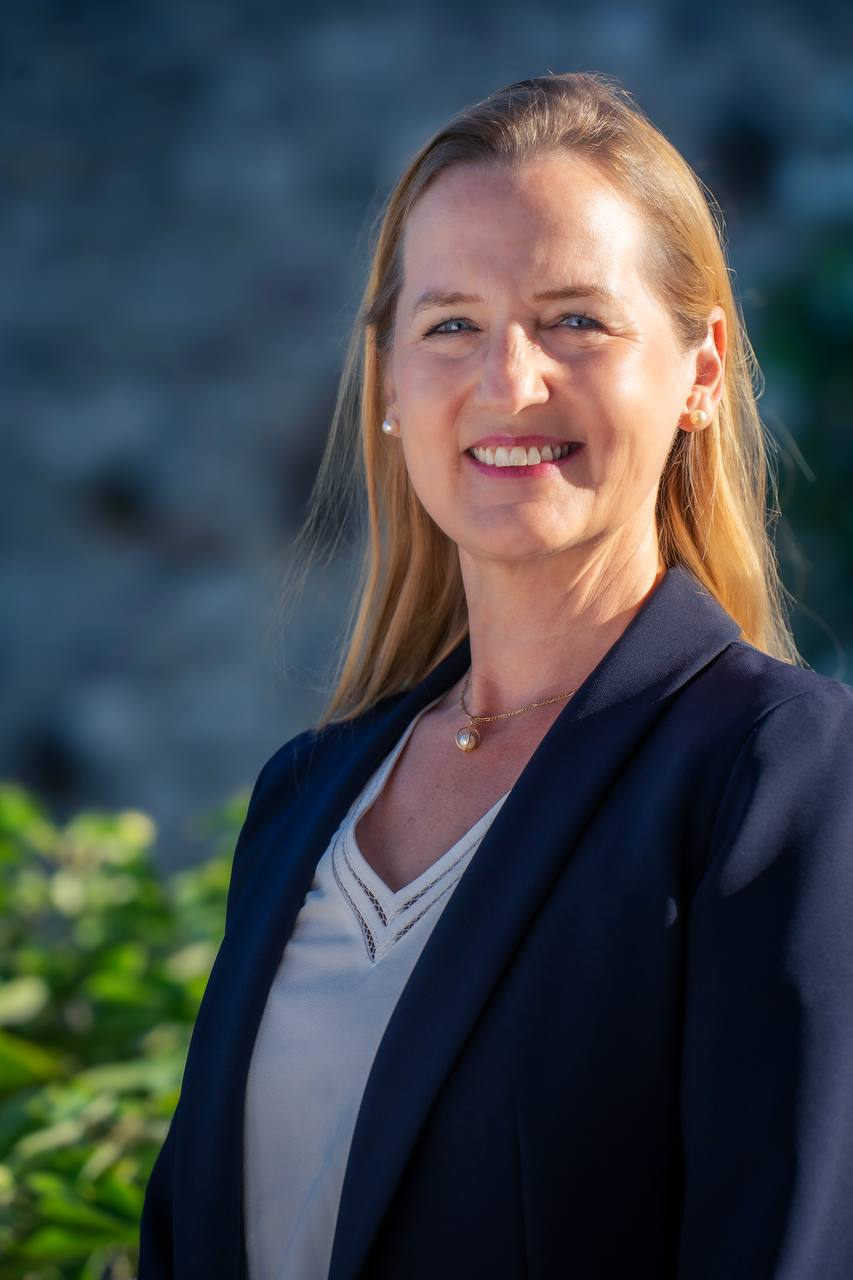
- Rimbert in 2024

Member of the National Assembly for Vaucluse's 5th constituency
- Incumbent
- Assumed office 8 July 2024
- Preceded by: Jean-François Lovisolo

Personal details
- Born: 13 September 1968 (age 57) Avignon, France
- Party: National Rally

Catherine Rimbert (born 13 September 1968) is a French politician who was elected deputy to the National Assembly in July 2024 in Vaucluse's 5th constituency. She is a member of the National Rally.

== Biography ==
Catherine Rimbert was born on 13 September 1968 in Avignon.

She was elected as a deputy in the 2024 French legislative election with 55.39% of the votes in Vaucluse's 5th constituency where she was opposed in the second round by Cécile Celce, candidate of the New Popular Front (44.61% of the votes).

== Mandates ==
- Since 8 July 2024: Députy for Vaucluse's 5th constituency
- Since 27 June 2021: Regional Councillor of Provence-Alpes-Côte d'Azur
- Since 28 June 2020: Municipal councilor of Carpentras

== See also ==
- List of deputies of the 17th National Assembly of France
