= Rhône's 1st constituency =

Constituency of the National Assembly of France

1st constituency of Rhône
- inline Constituency of the National Assembly of France

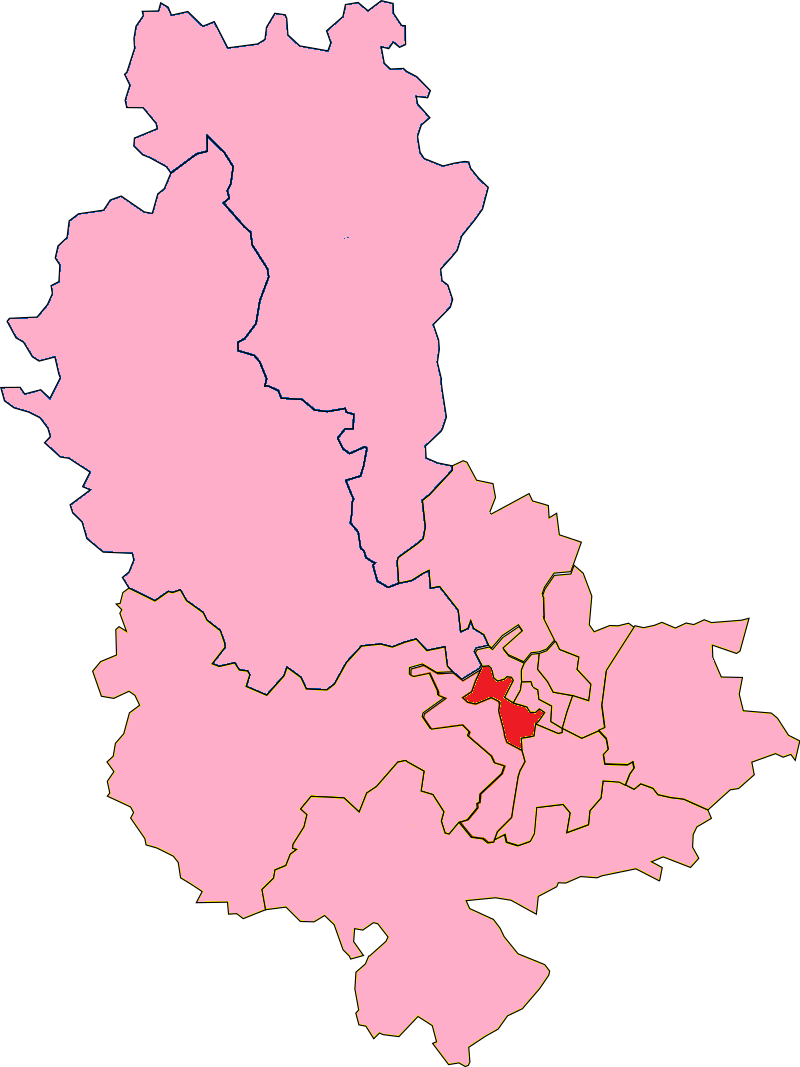
- Rhône's's 1st Constituency shown within Rhône
- Deputy: Anaïs Belouassa-Cherifi; LFI
- Department: Rhône
- Cantons: Lyon I [part], Lyon IV [part], Lyon V, Lyon X [part], Lyon XII [part]
- Registered voters: 69503

The 1st constituency of the Rhône (French: Première circonscription du Rhône) is a French legislative constituency in the Rhône département. Like the other 576 French constituencies, it elects one MP using a two round electoral system.

== Description ==
The 1st constituency of the Rhône includes western parts of a number of Cantons of Lyon. It is an urban seat in France's second largest city. Since 2015 this constituency has been part of the Lyon Metropolis and therefore outside of the Rhône for administrative purposes.

The seat was, until 2012, a stronghold of the centre right when it fell to Thierry Braillard of the PRG. It subsequently was captured by En Marche! in 2017.

== Assembly Members ==
Election	Member	Party
1988	Bernadette Isaac-Sibille	UDF
1993	Bernadette Isaac-Sibille	UDF
1997	Bernadette Isaac-Sibille	UDF
2002	Anne-Marie Comparini	UDF
2007	Michel Havard	UMP
2012	Thierry Braillard	PRG
2017	Thomas Rudigoz	LREM
2022	Thomas Rudigoz	LREM
2024	Anaïs Belouassa-Cherifi	LFI

== Election results ==
=== 2024 ===
Legislative Election 2024: Rhône's 1st constituency
Party	Candidate	Votes	%	±%
LFI (NFP)	Anaïs Belouassa-Cherifi	22,300	42.4	+4.65
RE (Ensemble)	Thomas Rudigoz	15,631	29.72	-3.16
RN	Laurent Mouton	9,521	18.1	+8.68
LR	Grégory Sansoz	3,070	5.84	−2.86
DVE	Anne Thiriat	1,176	2.24	N/A
REC	Brandon Alves	424	0.81	−2.14
LO	Jim Bungi	358	0.68	N/A
DIV	Ivanka Lopouchansky	2	0.00	N/A
DIV	Guillaume Eymeric	110	0.21	N/A
Turnout		51,728	98.66	+44.65
Registered electors		71,917		
2nd round result
LFI	Anaïs Belouassa-Cherifi	23,970	46.60	+3.98
RE	Thomas Rudigoz	18117	35.22	+5.69
RN	Laurent Mouton	9351	18.18	+0.10
Turnout		51438	98.21	+46.03
Registered electors		71,914		
LFI gain from RE				

=== 2022 ===
Legislative Election 2022: Rhône's 1st constituency
Party	Candidate	Votes	%	±%
LFI (NUPÉS)	Aurélie Gries	14,654	37.75	+8.06
LREM (Ensemble)	Thomas Rudigoz	12,792	32.96	-13.92
RN	Voliaria Gagarine	3,617	9.32	+1.90
LR (UDC)	Anne Prost	3,377	8.70	−3.77
REC	Sixtine Bonfils	1,529	3.94	N/A
LREM	Grégory Dayme*	1,460	3.76	N/A
Others	N/A	1,387	-	−
Turnout		38,816	54.01	+3.52
2nd round result
LREM (Ensemble)	Thomas Rudigoz	18,803	51.86	-12.61
LFI (NUPÉS)	Aurélie Gries	17,452	48.14	+12.61
Turnout		36,255	52.18	+12.93
LREM hold				

* Dayme ran as a dissident member of LREM without the support of the party or the Ensemble Citoyens alliance.

=== 2017 ===
Legislative Election 2017: Rhone's 1st constituency
Party	Candidate	Votes	%	±%
LREM	Thomas Rudigoz	16,449	46.88	
LFI	Elliott Aubin	4,825	13.75	
LR	Anne Lorne	4,374	12.47	−18.95
EELV	Bertrand Artigny	2,911	8.30	−10.06
FN	Tiffany Joncour	2,602	7.42	−2.93
PCF	Julien Giraudo	1,000	2.85	−2.88
Others	N/A	2,929		
Turnout		35,499	51.08	−4.04
2nd round result
LREM	Thomas Rudigoz	17,587	64.47	
LFI	Elliott Aubin	9,693	35.53	
Turnout		29,725	42.77	−9.99
LREM gain from PRG				

=== 2012 ===
Legislative Election 2012: Rhône's 1st constituency
Party	Candidate	Votes	%	±%
UMP	Michel Havard	11,709	31.42	−8.76
PRG	Thierry Braillard	9,843	26.41	+2.89
EELV	Philippe Meirieu	6,844	18.36	+14.76
FN	André Morin	3,859	10.35	+6.28
FG	Claude Fanher	2,137	5.73	+2.75
MoDem	Florence Maury	940	2.52	−14.85
Others	N/A	1,936		
Turnout		37,560	55.12	−3.50
2nd round result
PRG	Thierry Braillard	18,798	53.78	+5.32
UMP	Michel Havard	16,158	46.22	−5.32
Turnout		35,952	52.76	−2.60
PRG gain from UMP				

=== 2007 ===
Legislative Election 2007: Rhône's 1st constituency
Party	Candidate	Votes	%	±%
UMP	Michel Havard	14,877	40.18	+8.10
PRG	Thierry Braillard	8,709	23.52	
MoDem	Anne-Marie Comparini	6,430	17.37	
FN	André Morin	1,505	4.07	−8.60
LV	Bertrand Artigny	1,331	3.60	
PCF	Sabiha Ahmine	1,104	2.98	+1.07
Far left	Florence Lavialle	954	2.58	+1.07
Others	N/A	2,113		
Turnout		37,381	58.62	−8.04
2nd round result
UMP	Michel Havard	17,750	51.54	
PRG	Thierry Braillard	16,687	48.46	
Turnout		35,304	55.36	−4.15
UMP hold				

=== 2002 ===
Legislative Election 2002: Rhône's 1st constituency
Party	Candidate	Votes	%	±%
UMP	Anne-Marie Comparini	11,536	32.08	
PS	Jean-Louis Touraine	11,171	31.07	+4.15
FN	Corinne Lengele	4,557	12.67	−5.55
DVD	Bernadette Isaac-Sibille	4,351	12.10	−18.33
DVD	Marie-Laure Boulot	843	2.34	
Others	N/A	3,499		
Turnout		36,413	66.66	+2.59
2nd round result
UMP	Anne-Marie Comparini	17,265	55.44	+4.13
PS	Jean-Louis Touraine	13,878	44.56	−4.13
Turnout		32,259	59.51	−8.71
UMP gain from UDF				

=== 1997 ===
Legislative Election 1997: Rhône's 1st constituency
Party	Candidate	Votes	%	±%
UDF	Bernadette Isaac-Sibille	10,392	30.43	−8.79
PS	Gérard Collomb	9,192	26.92	+12.45
FN	Philippe Dumez	6,221	18.22	+0.96
PCF	Daniel Marlhoux	1,889	5.53	−1.39
LO	Marie-Christine Pernin	1,156	3.39	+1.04
DVD	Raphael Nogier	1,004	2.94	
Far left	Guy Front	721	2.11	
GE	Bernard Birot	689	2.02	−8.90
Others	N/A	2,881		
Turnout		35,148	64.07	−2.16
2nd round result
UDF	Bernadette Isaac-Sibille	18,139	51.31	−19.34
PS	Gérard Collomb	17,210	48.69	
Turnout		37,424	68.21	+8.98
UDF hold				
