= Vaucluse's 5th constituency =

Constituency of the National Assembly of France

5th constituency of Vaucluse
- inline Constituency of the National Assembly of France

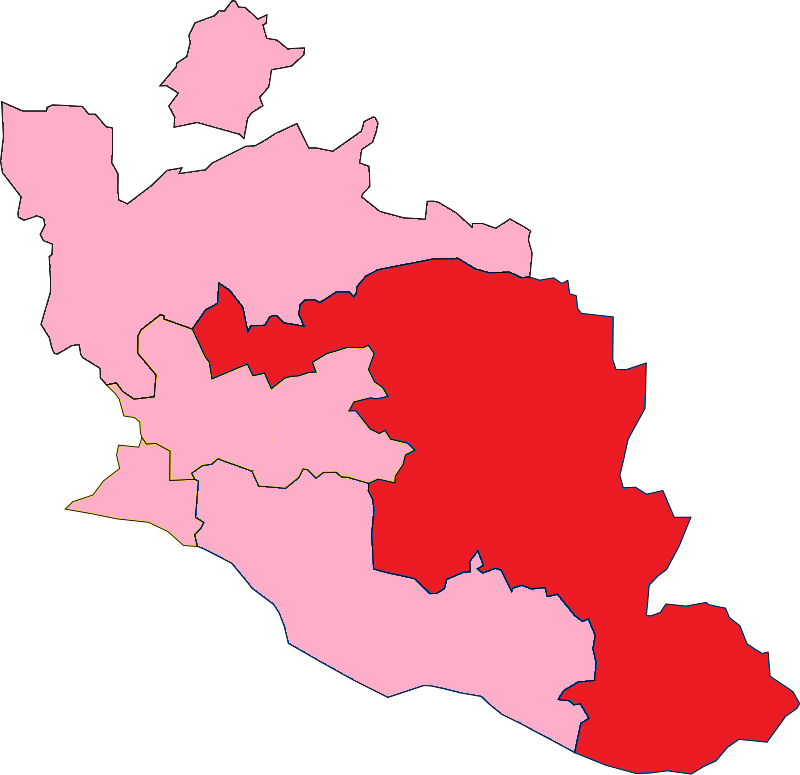
- Vaucluse's 5th Constituency shown within the Vaucluse
- Deputy: Catherine Rimbert; National Rally
- Department: Vaucluse
- Cantons: Apt, Carpentras Nord, Gordes, Mormoiron, Pertuis, Sault
- Registered voters: 81,870

The 5th constituency of the Vaucluse (French: Cinquième circonscription de Vaucluse) is a French legislative constituency in the Vaucluse département. Like the other 576 French constituencies, it elects one MP using the two-round system, with a run-off if no candidate receives over 50% of the vote in the first round.

== Description ==
The 5th constituency of the Vaucluse is the largest within the department, covering a large area in the east.

The seat was created as a result of the 2010 redistricting of French legislative constituencies which added a constituency in the Vaucluse.

== Assembly Members ==
Election	Member	Party
2012	Julien Aubert	UMP
2017	Julien Aubert	LR
2022	Jean-François Lovisolo	RE
2024	Catherine Rimbert	RN

== Election results ==
=== 2024 ===
Legislative Election 2024: Vaucluse's 5th constituency
Party	Candidate	Votes	%	±%
RN	Catherine Rimbert	25,415	45.03	+21.55
G.s (NFP)	Céline Celce	15,329	27.16	+4.90
RE (Ensemble)	Adrien Morenas	11,454	20.29	−4.68
REC	Alexandre Deshaies	734	1.30	−3.41
LR	Martin Lefèvre	3,512	6.22	−10.95
Turnout		56,444	96.83	+47.37
Registered electors		84,944		
2nd round result
RN	Catherine Rimbert	29,669	55.39	+6.18
G.s	Céline Celce	23,891	44.61	n/a
Turnout		53,560	91.62	+44.39
Registered electors		84,965		
RN gain from RE				

=== 2022 ===
Legislative Election 2022: Vaucluse's 5th constituency
Party	Candidate	Votes	%	±%
LREM (Ensemble)	Jean-François Lovisolo	10,244	24.97	-8.33
RN	Marie Thomas de Maleville	9,635	23.48	+5.04
G.s (NUPÉS)	Céline Celce	9,134	22.26	+6.74
LR (UDC)	Julien Aubert	7,044	17.17	−3.79
REC	Catherine Chavrier	1,932	4.71	N/A
DVE	Jean Vincetti	1,301	3.17	+1.55
Others	N/A	1,739	4.25	
Turnout		41,029	49.46	+0.71
2nd round result
LREM (Ensemble)	Jean-François Lovisolo	18,564	50.79	+1.68
RN	Marie Thomas de Maleville	17,990	49.21	N/A
Turnout		36,554	47.23	+8.78
LREM gain from LR				

=== 2017 ===
Legislative Election 2017: Vaucluse's 5th constituency
Party	Candidate	Votes	%	±%
LREM	Jean Viard	13,291	33.30	
LR	Julien Aubert	8,367	20.96	
FN	Marie Thomas De Maleville	7,361	18.44	
LFI	Stéphane Chotard	4,892	12.26	
PRG	Luc Reynard	1,922	4.82	
EELV	Marie-Christine Kadler	1,302	3.26	
Others	N/A	2,777		
Turnout		39,912	48.75	
2nd round result
LR	Julien Aubert	16,020	50.89	
LREM	Jean Viard	15,460	49.11	
Turnout		31,480	38.45	
LR hold				

=== 2012 ===
Legislative Election 2012: Vaucluse's 5th constituency
Party	Candidate	Votes	%	±%
PS	Jean-François Lovisolo	16,594	35.27	
UMP	Julien Aubert	12,356	26.27	
FN	Martine Furioli-Beaunier	11,484	24.41	
FG	Josette Pessemesse	2,799	5.95	
DVD	François Vaute	1,355	2.88	
Others	N/A	2,455		
Turnout		47,043	59.89	
2nd round result
UMP	Julien Aubert	22,628	50.33	
PS	Jean-François Lovisolo	22,330	49.67	
Turnout		44,958	57.24	
UMP win (new seat)				
