= Maine-et-Loire's 6th constituency =

Constituency of the National Assembly of France

6th constituency of Maine-et-Loire
- inline Constituency of the National Assembly of France

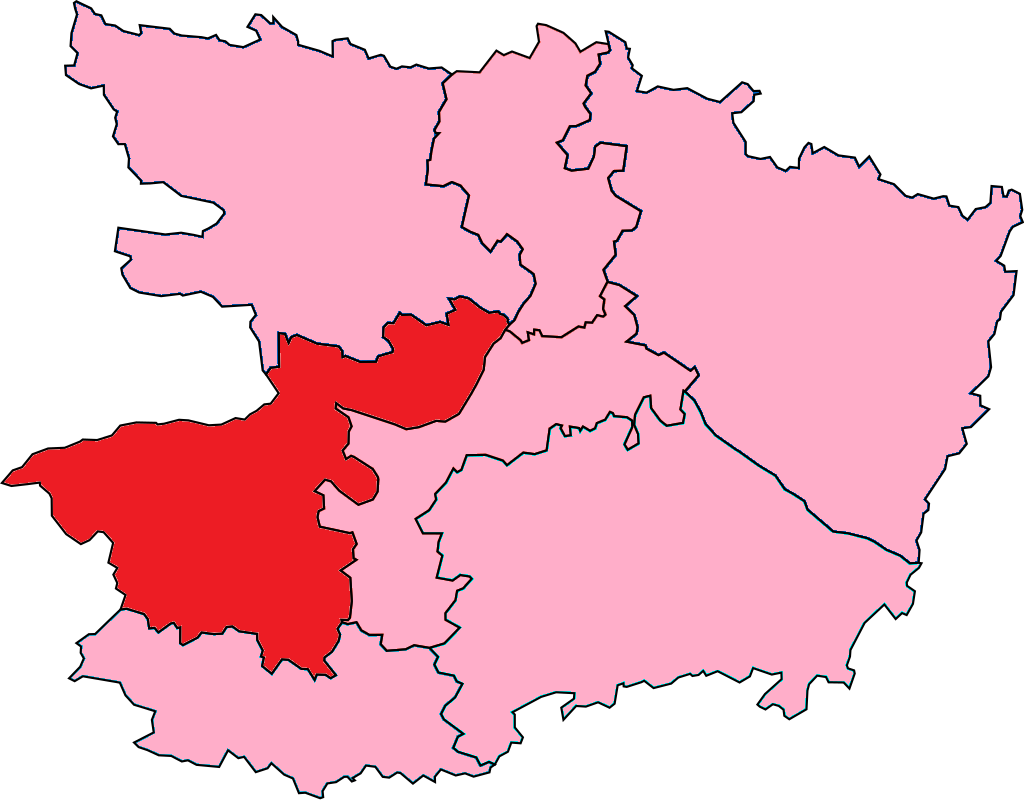
- Maine-et-Loire's 6th Constituency shown within Maine-et-Loire
- Deputy: Nicole Dubré-Chirat; RE
- Department: Maine-et-Loire
- Cantons: Angers Ouest, Beaupréau, Champtoceaux, Montrevault, Saint-Florent-le-Vieil, Saint-Georges-sur-Loire
- Registered voters: 77379

The 6th constituency of Maine-et-Loire (French: Sixième circonscription de Maine-et-Loire) is a French legislative constituency in the Maine-et-Loire département. Like the other 576 French constituencies, it elects one MP using a two round electoral system.

== Description ==
The 6th Constituency of Maine-et-Loire is situated in the west of the department. Whilst it includes the western parts of Angers it is a largely rural seat.

Up until 2012 the voters of this constituency favoured candidates from the centre right.

== Assembly members ==
Election	Member	Party
1988	Hervé de Charette	UDF
1993	Alain Levoyer	UDF
1997	Hervé de Charette	UDF
2002	Hervé de Charette	UMP
2007	Hervé de Charette	UMP
2012	Serge Bardy	DVG
2017	Nicole Dubré-Chirat	LREM
2022	Nicole Dubré-Chirat	RE

== Election results ==
=== 2024 ===
Candidate	Party	Alliance	First round		Second round	
Candidate	Party	Alliance	Votes	%	Votes	%
Nicole Dubré-Chirat	REN	Ensemble	23,776	35.28	43,226	66.32
Tim Pavageau	RN		19,422	28.82	21,954	33.68
Sylvie Gabin	LFI		16,707	24.79		
Eric Mercier	DLF	DSV	1,243	1.84		
Yann Le Diagon	LO		1,099	1.63		
Valid votes			67,389	96.58	65,180	93.76
Blank votes			1,618	2.32	3,175	4.57
Null votes			766	1.10	1,164	1.67
Turnout			69,773	70.01	69,519	69.74
Abstentions			29,883	29.99	30,160	30.26
Registered voters			99,656		99,679	
Result			REN HOLD			

=== 2022 ===
Legislative Election 2022: Maine-et-Loire's 6th constituency
Party	Candidate	Votes	%	±%
LREM (Ensemble)	Nicole Dubre-Chirat	14,074	31.04	-12.53
LFI (NUPÉS)	Tassadir Amghar	12,596	27.78	+6.12
RN	Pie-Louis Lecluse	7,229	15.94	+7.24
DVC	Bernadette Humeau	5,550	12.24	N/A
LR (UDC)	Geneviève Gaillard	1,894	4.18	−16.26
REC	Marie Durand	1,335	2.94	N/A
R!	Bruno Ciofi	1,108	2.44	N/A
DLF (UPF)	Lydie Crevenna	936	2.06	N/A
LO	Yann Le Diagon	625	1.38	N/A
Turnout		45,347	47.78	−3.48
2nd round result
LREM (Ensemble)	Nicole Dubre-Chirat	24,616	57.60	-4.17
LFI (NUPÉS)	Tassadir Amghar	18,120	42.40	N/A
Turnout		42,736	46.80	+8.08
LREM hold				

=== 2017 ===
Legislative Election 2017: Maine-et-Loire's 6th constituency
Party	Candidate	Votes	%	±%
LREM	Nicole Dubré-Chirat	21,153	43.57	
LR	André Martin	9,922	20.44	
LFI	Maryline Fonteneau Grelet	5,851	12.05	
PS	Serge Bardy	4,666	9.61	
FN	Bernadette De La Bourdonnaye	4,222	8.70	
DLF	Thomas Chamaille	1,111	2.29	
Others	N/A	1,621		
Turnout		48,546	51.26	
2nd round result
LREM	Nicole Dubre-Chirat	22,649	61.77	
LR	André Martin	14,017	38.23	
Turnout		36,666	38.72	
LREM gain from DVG				

=== 2012 ===
Legislative Election 2012: Maine-et-Loire's 6th constituency
Party	Candidate	Votes	%	±%
NM	Hervé De Charette	12,692	23.41	
DVG	Serge Bardy	11,331	20.90	
DVD	André Martin	10,983	20.26	
EELV	Marianne Prodhomme	8,912	16.44	
FN	Olivier Douay	4,164	7.68	
FG	Marc Gicquel	1,937	3.57	
MoDem	Alain Picard	1,568	2.89	
Others	N/A	2,621		
Turnout		54,208	58.58	
2nd round result
DVG	Serge Bardy	25,700	52.18	
NM	Hervé De Charette	23,552	47.82	
Turnout		49,252	53.21	
DVG gain from UMP				
