= Anaïs Belouassa-Cherifi =

French politician (born 1995)

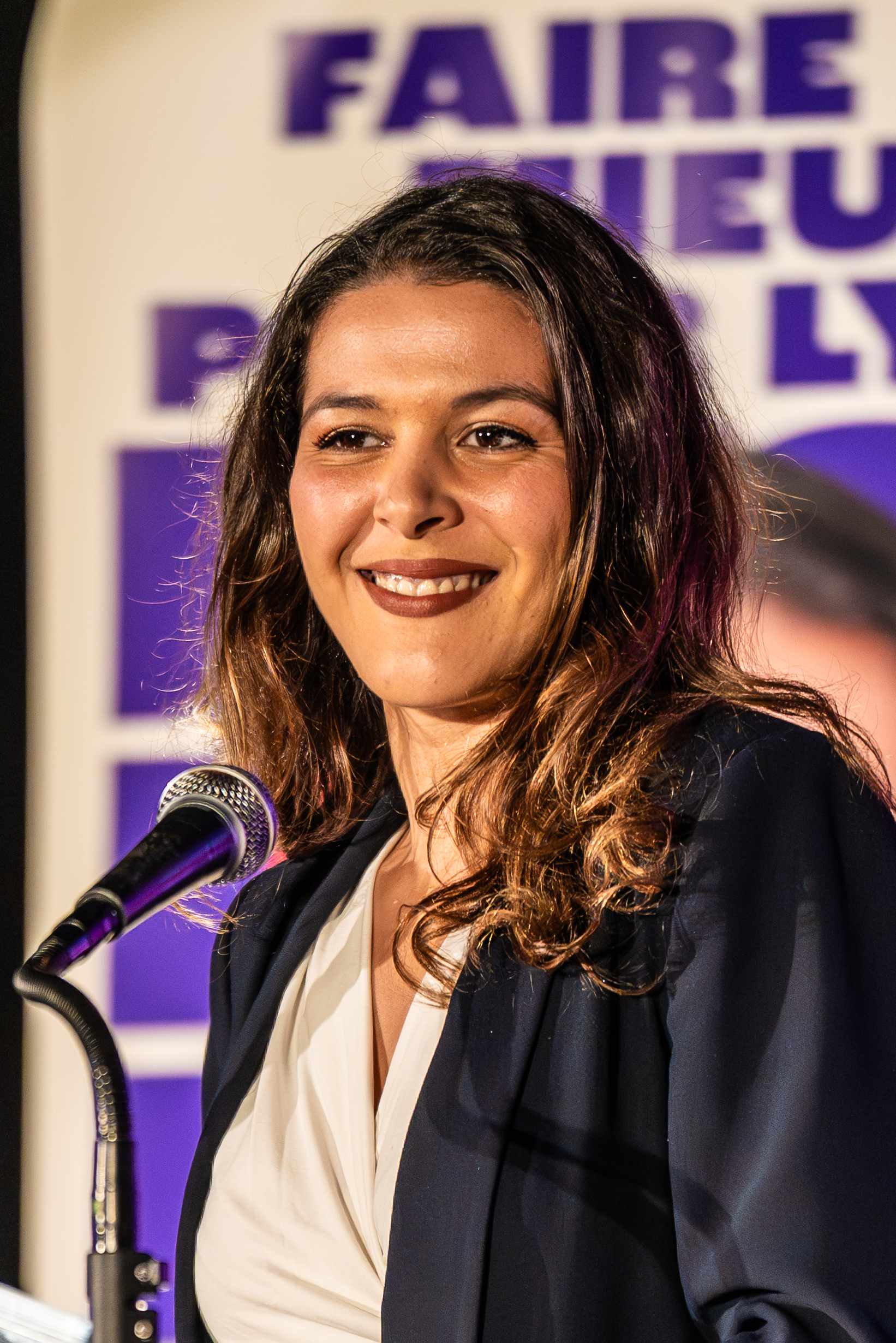
- Anaïs Belouassa-Cherifi in 2026.

Member of the French National Assembly for Rhône's 1st constituency
- Incumbent
- Assumed office 18 July 2024
- Preceded by: Thomas Rudigoz

Personal details
- Born: 7 February 1995 (age 31) Thionville, France
- Party: La France Insoumise (since 2019)

Anaïs Belouassa-Cherifi (born 7 February 1995) is a French politician of La France Insoumise. She was elected member of the National Assembly for Rhône's 1st constituency in 2024.

== Biography ==
Active in the Union Nationale des Étudiants de France (UNEF) during her studies, she holds a degree in political science from the University of Lyon 2. She first joined the Radical Left Party before becoming involved with La France Insoumise in 2017 or 2019 (depending on the source). She is of Algerian descent through her maternal grandfather, who worked in the mines, and holds Algerian citizenship. She is active in the Bron handball club, where she played in the Pro-Nationale league. She has also worked as a sports instructor.

For the 2022 French presidential election, she is the campaign manager for Jean-Luc Mélenchon and is seen as part of his inner circle.

In the 2024 European elections, she was ranked 35th on La France Insoumise's slate, which meant she was not elected.
