= Nicole Dubré-Chirat =

French politician (born 1951)

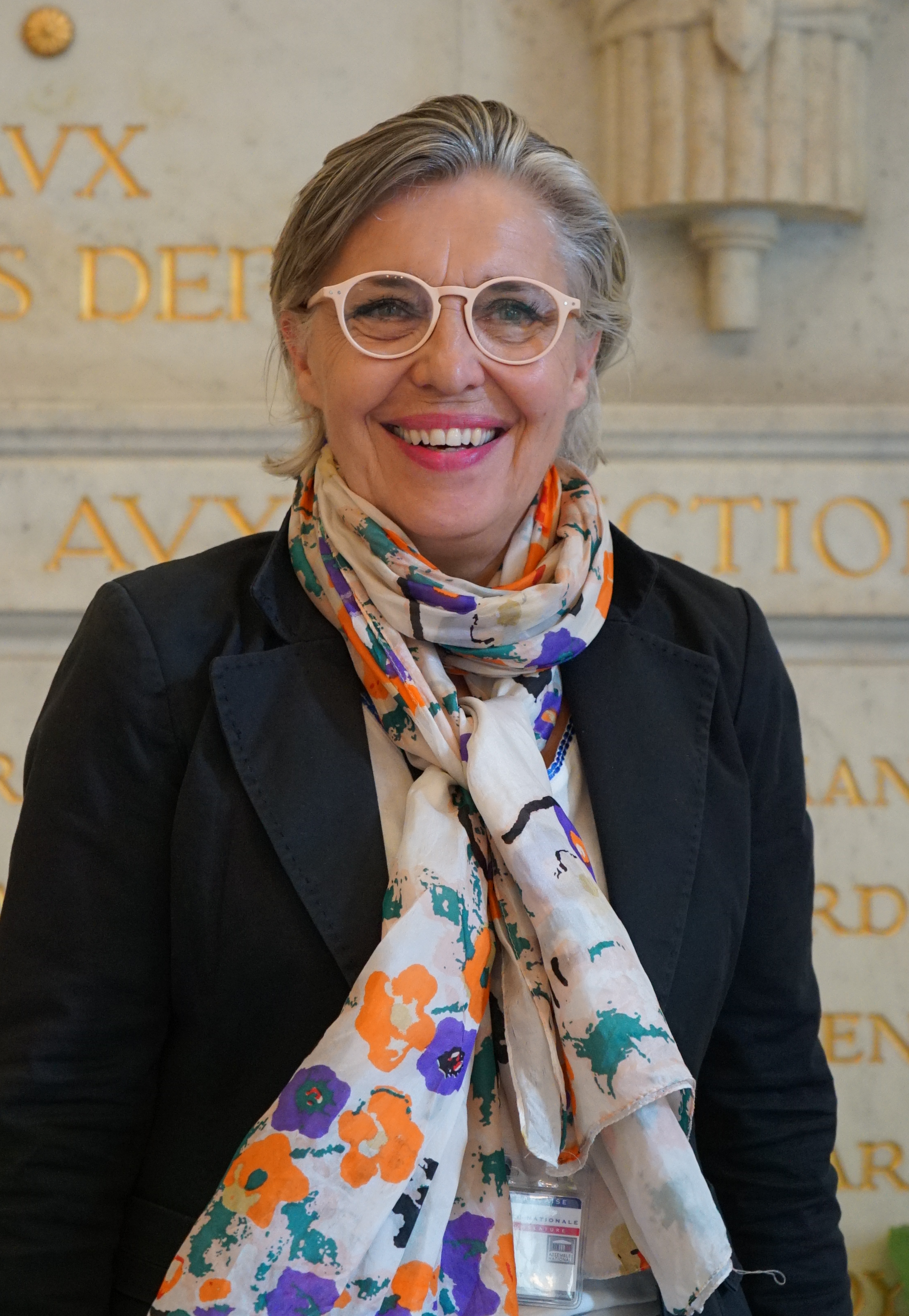

Member of the National Assembly for Maine-et-Loire
- Incumbent
- Assumed office 21 June 2017
- Preceded by: Serge Bardy

Personal details
- Born: 8 December 1951 (age 74) Felletin, France
- Party: La République En Marche!

Nicole Dubré-Chirat (born 18 December 1951) is a French politician of La République En Marche! (LREM) who has been serving as a member of the National Assembly since 18 June 2017, representing the department of Maine-et-Loire.

== Political career ==
In parliament, Dubré-Chirat serves on the Committee on Legal Affairs. In addition to her committee assignments, she is part of the French-Bulgarian Parliamentary Friendship Group, the French-Slovak Parliamentary Friendship Group, and the French-Montenegrin Parliamentary Friendship Group.

She chaired the Conseil interdépartemental de l'Ordre des infirmières for Maine-et-Loire, Mayenne and Sarthe, from 2008 to 2017.

In 2023, Dubré-Chirat pushed for an provision in a bill that all town halls must display a presidential portrait.

== Political positions ==
In July 2019, Dubré-Chirat voted in favor of the French ratification of the European Union’s Comprehensive Economic and Trade Agreement (CETA) with Canada.

== See also ==
- 2017 French legislative election
