= Michel Terrot =

French politician

Michel Terrot (born December 18, 1948, in Lyon) is a member of the National Assembly of France. He represents the Rhône department, and is a member of the Union for a Popular Movement.
