= Philippe Bolo =

French politician (born 1967)

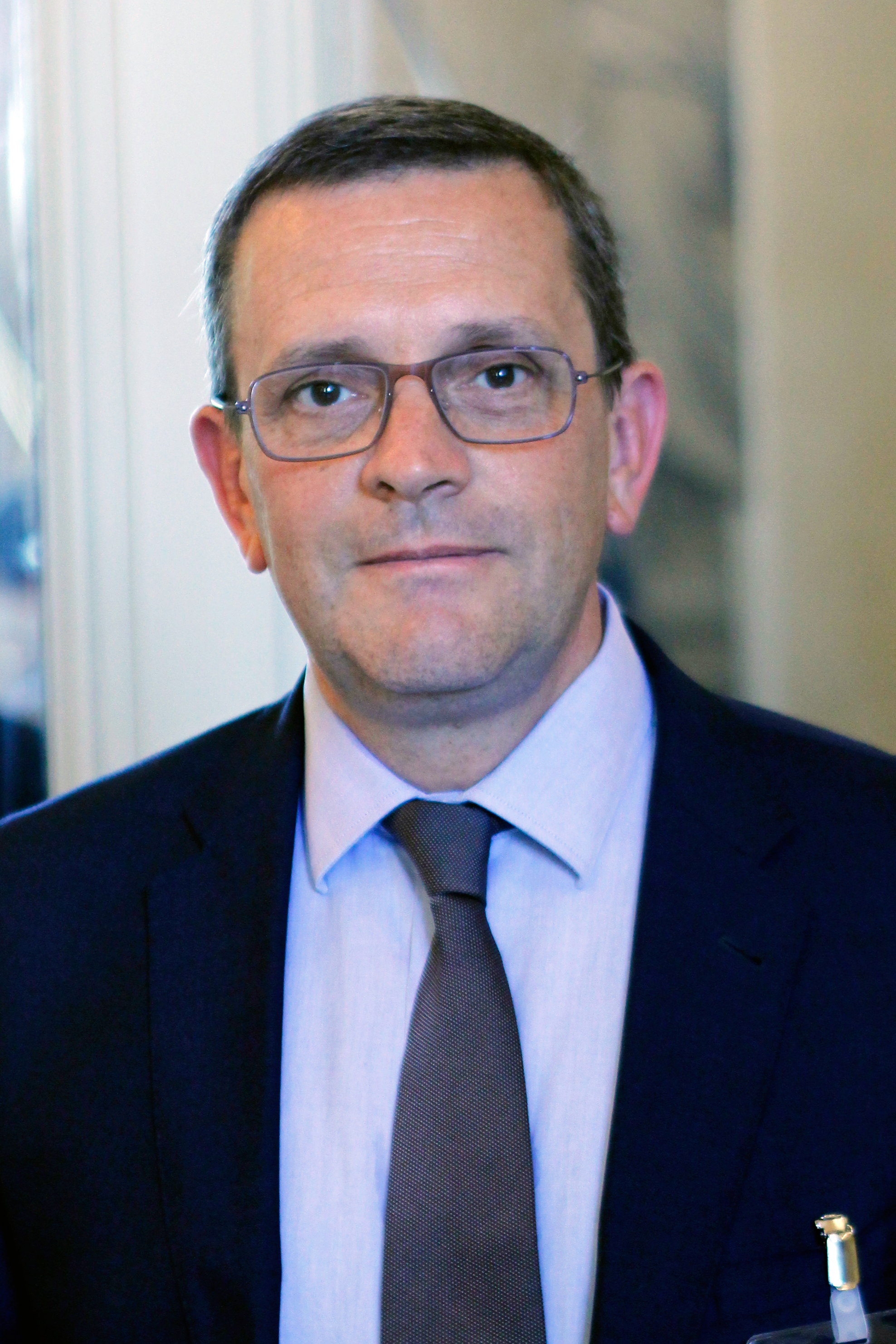

Philippe Bolo (French pronunciation: [filip bɔlo]; born 25 Mars 1967) is a French politician of the Democratic Movement who has been serving as a member of the French National Assembly since 18 June 2017, representing the department of Maine-et-Loire.

== Early life and career ==
Bolo is an agronomic engineer who moved to Avrillé in Maine-et-Loire in 2002.

== Political career ==
Bolo became the deputy mayor of Avrillé with support of the Republicans. He competed with the UDI-MoDem list in the 2014 European Parliament election for France.

In parliament, Bolo serves as member of the Committee on Economic Affairs and the Parliamentary Office for the Evaluation of Scientific and Technological Choices (OPECST). In addition to his committee assignments, he is a member of the French-Japanese Parliamentary Friendship Group.
