= Michel Durafour =

French politician

Mayor of Saint-Étienne
- In office 1964–1977
- Preceded by: Alexandre de Fraissinette
- Succeeded by: Joseph Sanguedolce

Personal details
- Born: 11 April 1920 Saint-Étienne, France
- Died: 27 July 2017 (aged 97) Saint-Étienne, France
- Party: Radical Party

Michel Durafour (French pronunciation: [miʃɛl dyʁafuʁ]; 11 April 1920 in Saint-Étienne, Loire – 27 July 2017) was a French politician. He served in many government posts under Jacques Chirac, Raymond Barre and Michel Rocard, and was Mayor of Saint-Étienne from 1964 to 1977.

In 1988, while serving as Minister of Public Service in Rocard's government, Durafour was the subject of a reply to his suggestion to "exterminate the Front National" which provoked a "storm of criticism". Jean-Marie Le Pen, a far right defeated presidential candidate, referred to Durafour as "Mr. Durafour-crematoire", a play on words as "four" is the French term for oven, and "oven crematorium" is a reference to the Nazi death camps of the Second World War. Alain Juppé responded by stating that "There are words one does not make jokes about" while the French Socialist Party spokesman Jean-Jack Queyranne stated that "Mr. Le Pen is showing what he is at heart: a racist and an anti-Semite". Le Pen himself stated that he was responding to Durafour's own accusations regarding Le Pen's role in World War II, and that "Mr. Durafour is not just an imbecile but a bum".
