= Regional Council of Rhône-Alpes =

The Rhône-Alpes Regional Council was the Conseil régional of the former Rhône-Alpes region of France until its abolition on 1 January 2016 to form of the newly formed Auvergne-Rhône-Alpes region. It was chaired by Jean-Jack Queyranne (as of 2009). It consisted of 157 regional councillors.

The Regional Council of Rhône-Alpes was replaced by the new Regional Council of Auvergne-Rhône-Alpes of the newly formed Auvergne-Rhône-Alpes region on 1 January 2016 following the 2015 regional elections.

== Seats ==
=== By party ===
as of 2009:

Party		seats
•	Socialist Party	47
	Union for a Popular Movement	24
•	The Greens	20
	National Front	18
•	French Communist Party	15
	MoDem	11
•	Left Radical Party	7
	Radical-UMP	5
	New Centre	5
	Left Party	4
	New Anticapitalist Party former PCF councillor	1

== Elections ==
=== 2004 ===
Candidate	Party	Votes (Round One)	% (Round One)	Votes (Round Two)	% (Round Two)
Jean-Jack Queyranne	PS-PRG-PCF	688,718	32.19%	1,083,755	46.52%
Anne-Marie Comparini	UDF-UMP-CAP21-FRS	667,856	31.22%	889,815	38.20%
Bruno Gollnisch	FN	389,565	18.21%	355,864	15.28%
Gérard Leras	Verts	215,783	10.09%	-	-
Patrick Bertrand	GRAD-Union of Radical Republicans (U2R)	46,611	2.18%	-	-
Norbert Chetail	MNR	35,310	1.65%	-	-
Roseline Vachetta	LO/LCR	95,524	4.47%	-	-
Total		2,139,367	100.00%	2,329,434	100.00%

== Past Regional Councils ==
=== 1998 ===
Party		seats
	National Front	35
	Socialist Party	31
•	Union for French Democracy	29
•	Rally for the Republic	29
	French Communist Party	12
	The Greens	9
	Miscellaneous Left	6
	Left Radical Party	2
•	Miscellaneous Right	1
•	Movement for France	1
	Citizen and Republican Movement	1
	Ligue savoisienne	1
	Hunting, Fishing, Nature, Traditions	1

=== 1992 ===
Party		seats
•	Rally for the Republic-Union for French Democracy	63
	National Front	29
	Socialist Party	29
	French Communist Party	12
	Ecology Generation	11
	The Greens	10
	Ecologist	2
	Hunting, Fishing, Nature, Traditions	1

=== 1986 ===
Party		seats
•	Rally for the Republic-Union for French Democracy	76
	Socialist Party	48
	National Front	14
	French Communist Party	13

=== Past Presidents ===
- Charles Béraudier (1986-1988)
- Charles Millon (1988-1998)
- Anne-Marie Comparini (1999-2004)
- Jean-Jack Queyranne (2004-)
