= Charles Millon =

French politician (born 1945)

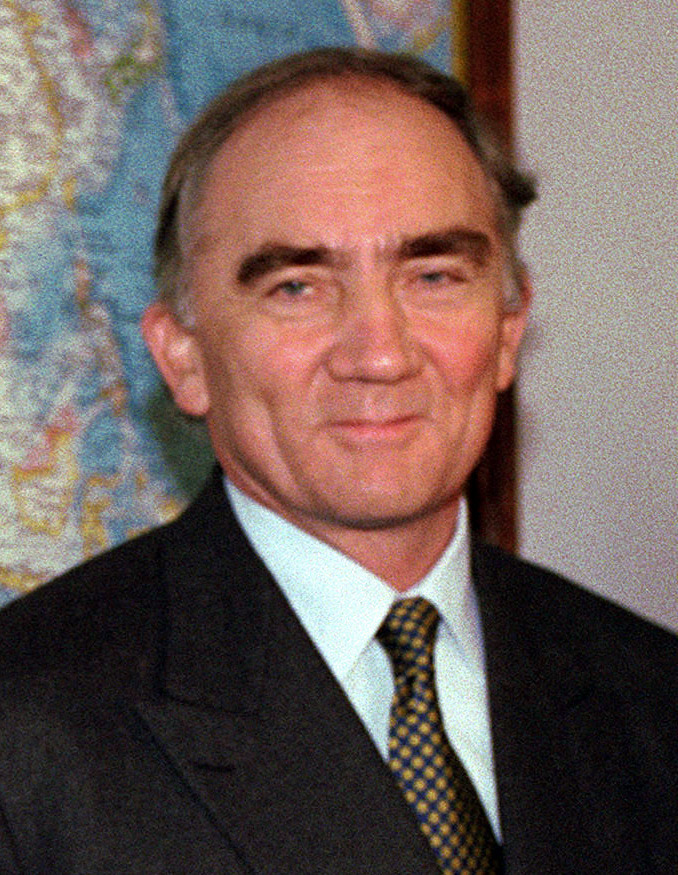
- Millon in 1997

Minister of Defence
- In office 18 May 1995 – 2 June 1997
- President: Jacques Chirac
- Prime Minister: Alain Juppé
- Preceded by: François Léotard
- Succeeded by: Alain Richard

President of the Regional Council of Rhône-Alpes
- In office 27 October 1988 – 3 January 1999
- Preceded by: Charles Béraudier
- Succeeded by: Anne-Marie Comparini

Member of the National Assembly for Ain's 3rd constituency
- In office 1997–2001
- Succeeded by: Étienne Blanc

Mayor of Belley
- In office 25 March 1977 – 23 March 2001
- Preceded by: Charles Vulliod
- Succeeded by: Jean-Claude Travers

Personal details
- Born: 13 November 1945 (age 81) Belley, Ain, France
- Party: UDF (1978-1998); The Right (since 1999)
- Spouse: Chantal Delsol
- Education: University of Lyon

Charles Marie Philippe Millon (French pronunciation: [ʃaʁl(ə) mijɔ̃]; born 13 November 1945) is a French politician who served as Minister of Defence from 1995 to 1997 under Prime Minister Alain Juppé. A former member of the Union for French Democracy (UDF), he represented Ain in the National Assembly (1978–1995; 1997–2001), where he took the presidency of the UDF group over from Jean-Claude Gaudin from 1989 until 1995. Millon also held the mayorship of his native town of Belley from 1977 to 2001 and presidency of the Regional Council of Rhône-Alpes from 1988 to 1999.

As Defence Minister, Millon led the highly sensitive 1997 reform on the professionalisation of the French Armed Forces, which had been decided the year prior by President Jacques Chirac in order to abolish the military service. In 1998, to retain the presidency of the regional council, Millon agreed on being elected with votes from Jean-Marie Le Pen's National Front (FN) and was subsequently expelled from the UDF. He then created his own party, The Right (LD), aiming at federating French liberals and conservatives, which met limited success.

Millon ran in 2001 municipal election for Mayor of Lyon and served one term as a municipal councillor for the 3rd arrondissement. Having been defeated in his 2002 parliamentary run in Rhône, he was nominated in 2003 as France's ambassador to the Food and Agriculture Organization (FAO) in Rome, where he advocated for African development. He retained the position until 2007.

== Political career ==
Governmental functions

- Minister of Defence: 1995–1997

Electoral mandates
National Assembly of France

- President of the Union for French Democracy Group in the National Assembly: 1989–1995 (became minister in 1995). Elected in 1989, reelected in 1993.
- Vice-president of the National Assembly: 1986–1988.
- Member of the National Assembly of France for Ain: 1978–1995 (became minister in 1995), 1997–2001 (resignation). Elected in 1978, reelected in 1981, 1986, 1988, 1993, and 1997.

Regional Council

- President of the Regional Council of Rhône-Alpes: 1988–1999 (resignation). Reelected in 1992 and 1998.
- Regional councillor of Rhône-Alpes: 1978–2003 (resignation). Elected in 1986, reelected in 1992 and 1998.

General Council

- General councillor of Ain: 1985–1988 (resignation).

Municipal Council

- Mayor of Belley: 1977–2001. Reelected in 1983, 1989, and 1995.
- Municipal councillor of Belley: 1977–2001. Reelected in 1983, 1989, and 1995.
- Municipal councillor of Lyon: 2001–2008.

Urban Community Council

- Member of the Urban Community of Lyon: 2001–2008.

Political offices
Preceded by François Léotard	Minister of Defence; 1995–1997	Succeeded by Alain Richard
Preceded by Charles Béraudier	President of the Rhône-Alpes Regional Council; 1988–1999	Succeeded by Anne-Marie Comparini
