= Anne-Marie Comparini =

French politician (1947–2025)

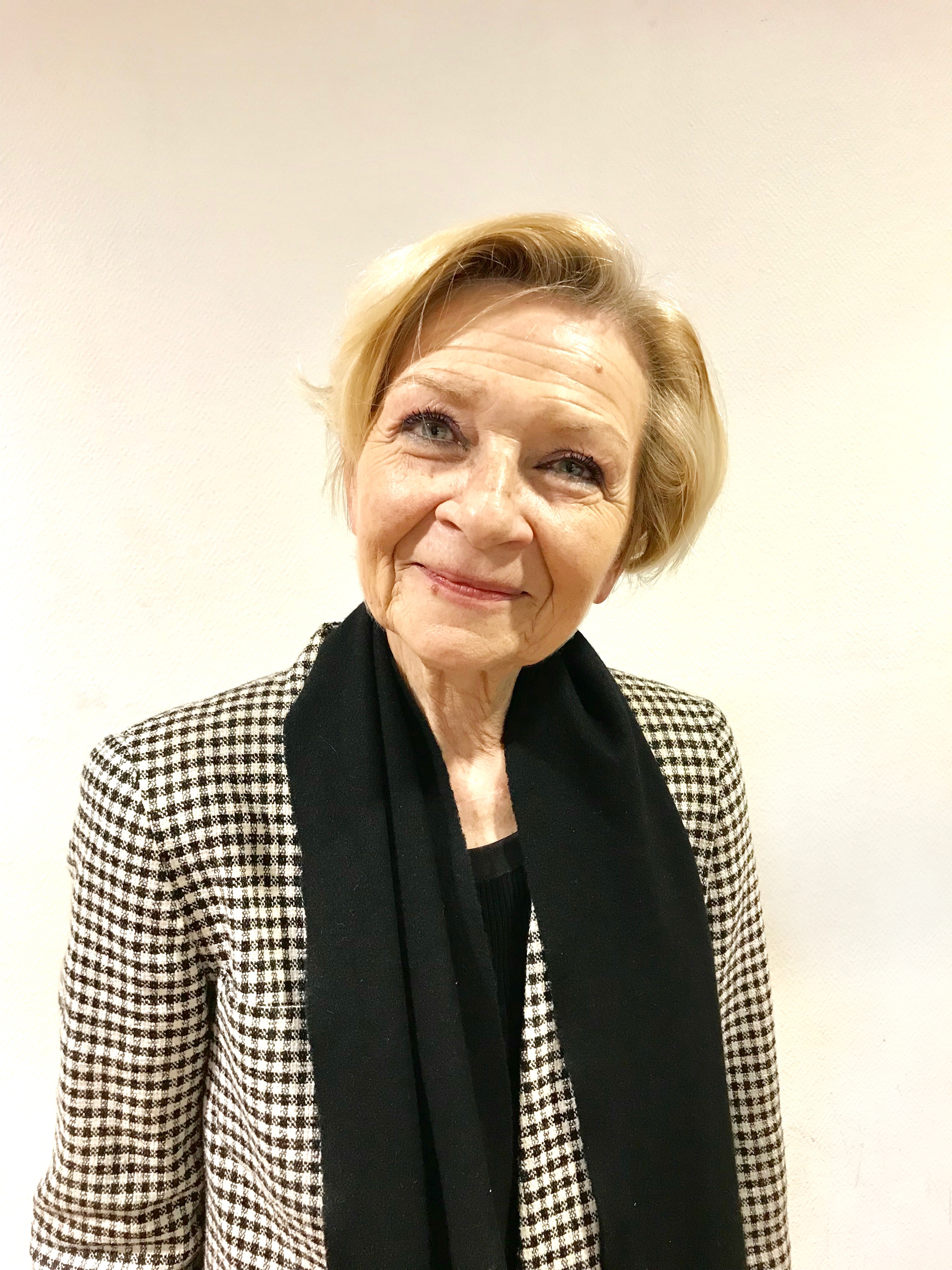

President of the Regional Council of Rhône-Alpes
- In office 1999–2004
- Preceded by: Charles Millon
- Succeeded by: Jean-Jack Queyranne

Member of the National Assembly for Rhône's 1st constituency
- In office 2002–2007
- Preceded by: Bernadette Isaac-Sibille
- Succeeded by: Michel Havard

Deputy Mayor of Lyon
- In office 1995–2001
- Mayor: Raymond Barre

Personal details
- Born: 11 July 1947 Orange, France
- Died: 5 January 2025 (aged 77)
- Party: MoDem

Anne-Marie Comparini (11 July 1947 – 5 January 2025) was a French politician. She was a Member of Parliament and a President of the Rhône-Alpes Regional Council.

== Life and career ==
Comparini studied law at Lyon, graduating in public law, and worked at the Office de Radiodiffusion Télévision Française (former French national broadcaster, equivalent to the BBC) and the Institut national de l'audiovisuel (broadcasting regulator) before becoming parliamentary assistant to Raymond Barre from 1978 to 2001. She entered the Regional Council of Rhône-Alpes in 1986 and was re-elected in 1992. Between 1995 and 2001, she was adjutant to Raymond Barre in the Lyon Mayoralty, charged with city policy and universities.

Charles Millon's election to the Presidency of the Regional Council of Rhône-Alpes was invalidated by the State Council in 1999, at which time she was elected to lead the region, largely thanks to the support of the Union for French Democracy who refused to participate in Millon's alliance with the National Front. She lost to the candidate of the political left, Jean-Jack Queyranne, in the 2004 election.

On 16 June 2002, she was elected a member of parliament to the XIIth Parliament (2002–2007), where she was a member of the Law Commission. She remained loyal to François Bayrou in the 2007 presidential election, when she was defeated in the first round. In the same month (June), Patrick Devedjian famously called her a salope ("slut") on-camera on the Lyon metropolitan television channel.

Although a regional councillor promised to head the list of candidates for the Lyon municipality, she nevertheless announced her decision to withdraw from politics in September 2007. She continued as regional councillor until September 2010. She died on 5 January 2025, at the age of 77.

== Honours and awards ==
Chevalier of the Order of Legion of Honour

Political offices
Preceded by Charles Millon	President of the Rhône-Alpes Regional Council; 1999–2004	Succeeded by Jean-Jack Queyranne
