= Chaponost =

- Commune
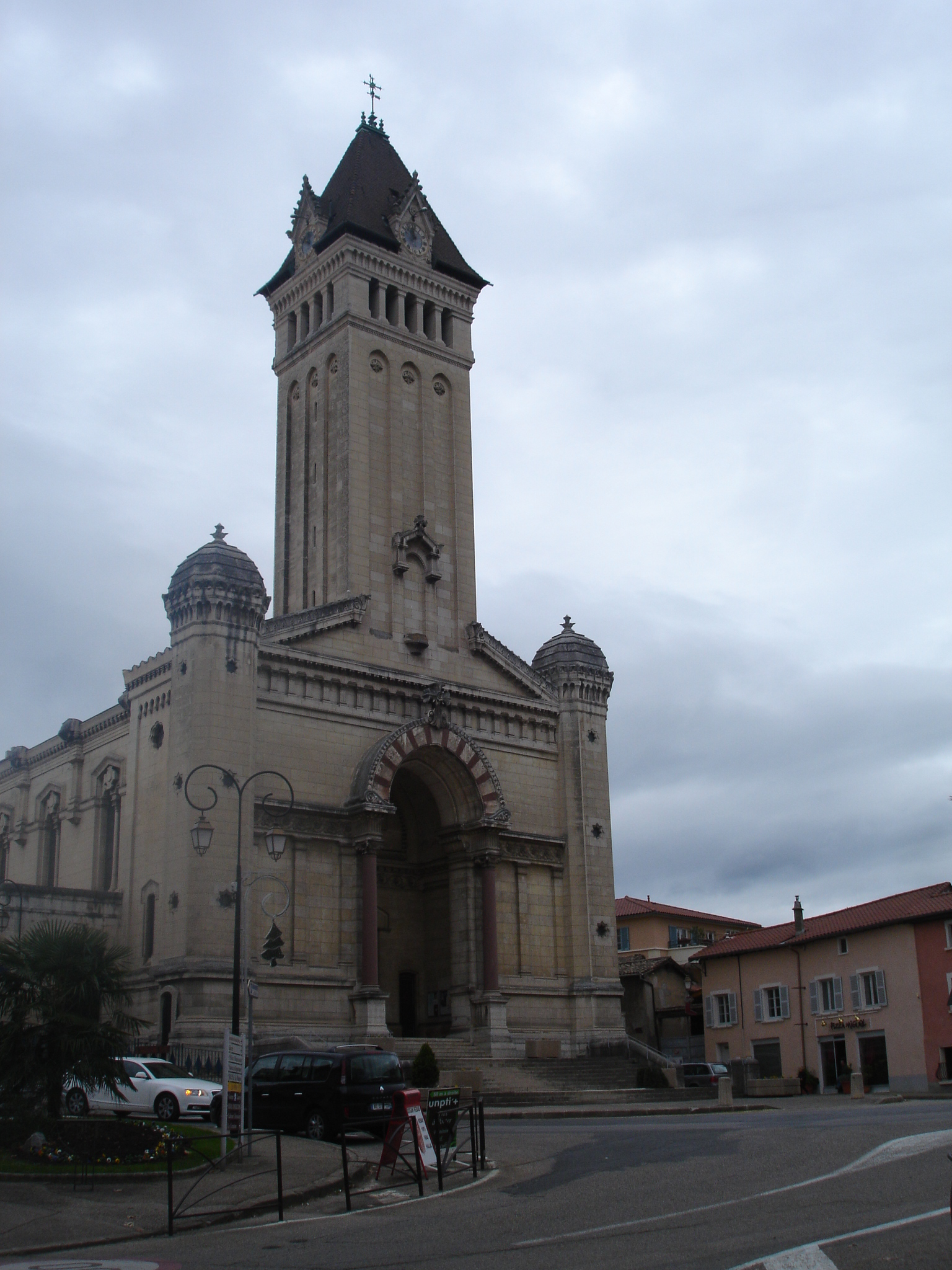
- Church of Chaponost
- Location of Chaponost
- Location within France Location within Auvergne-Rhône-Alpes
- Coordinates: 45°42′39″N 4°44′33″E
- Country: France
- Region: Auvergne-Rhône-Alpes
- Department: Rhône
- Arrondissement: Lyon
- Canton: Brignais
- Intercommunality: Vallée du Garon

Government
  - Mayor (2020–2026): Damien Combet
- Area^{1}: 16.32 km^{2} (6.30 sq mi)
- Elevation: 325 m (1,066 ft)
- Highest elevation: 336 m (1,102 ft)
- Lowest elevation: 180 m (590 ft)
- Population (2023): 9,382
  - Density: 574.9/km^{2} (1,489/sq mi)
- Time zone: UTC+01:00 (CET)
  - Summer (DST): UTC+02:00 (CEST)
- INSEE/Postal code: 69043 /69630
- ^{1} French Land Register data, which excludes lakes, ponds, glaciers > 1 km^{2} (0.386 sq mi or 247 acres) and river estuaries.

Chaponost (French pronunciation: [ʃapɔno]) is a commune in the Rhône department in eastern France.

It is known for its Roman aqueducts.

== Monuments ==
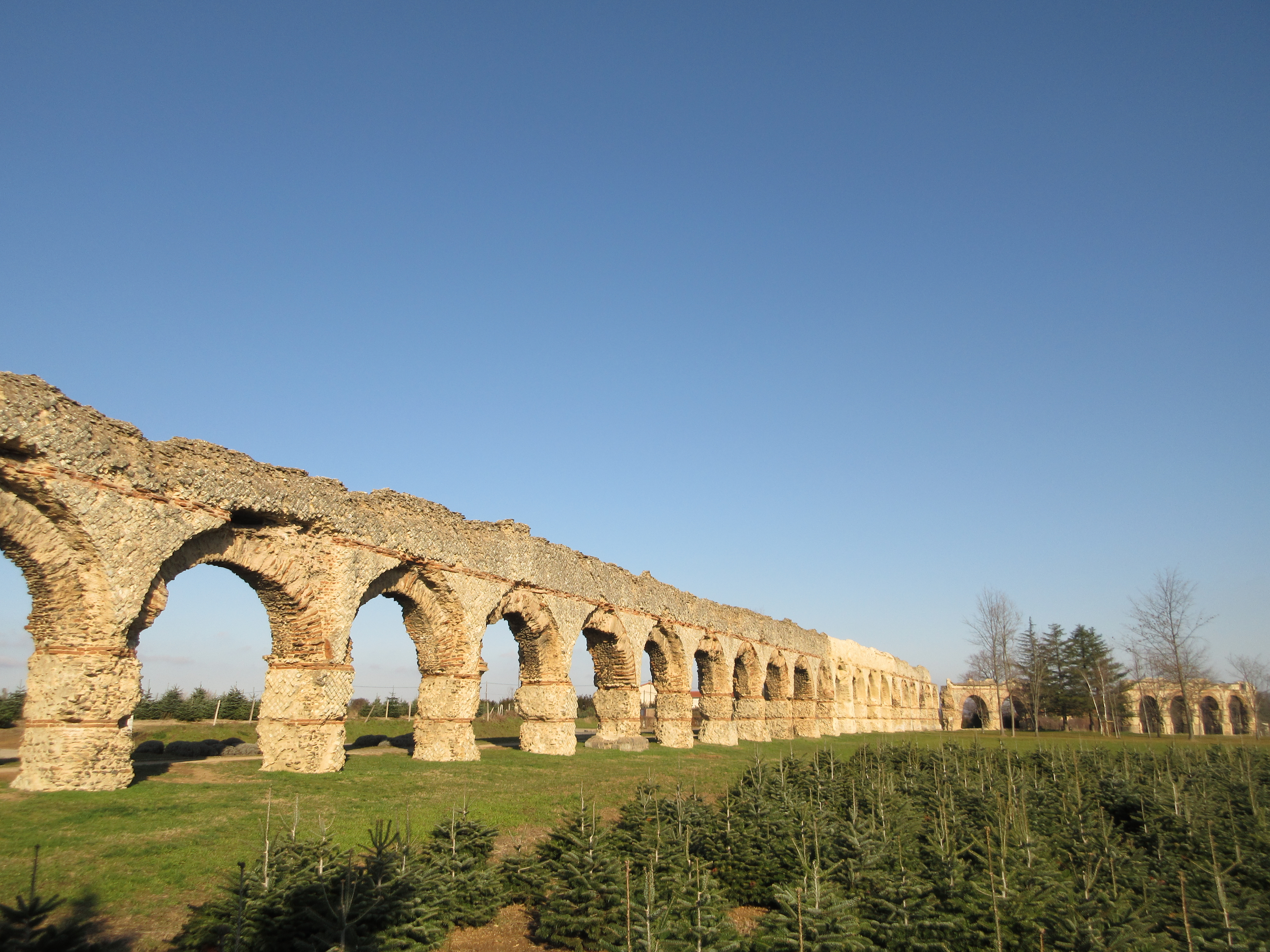
Vestiges of the Roman aqueduct in Chaponost

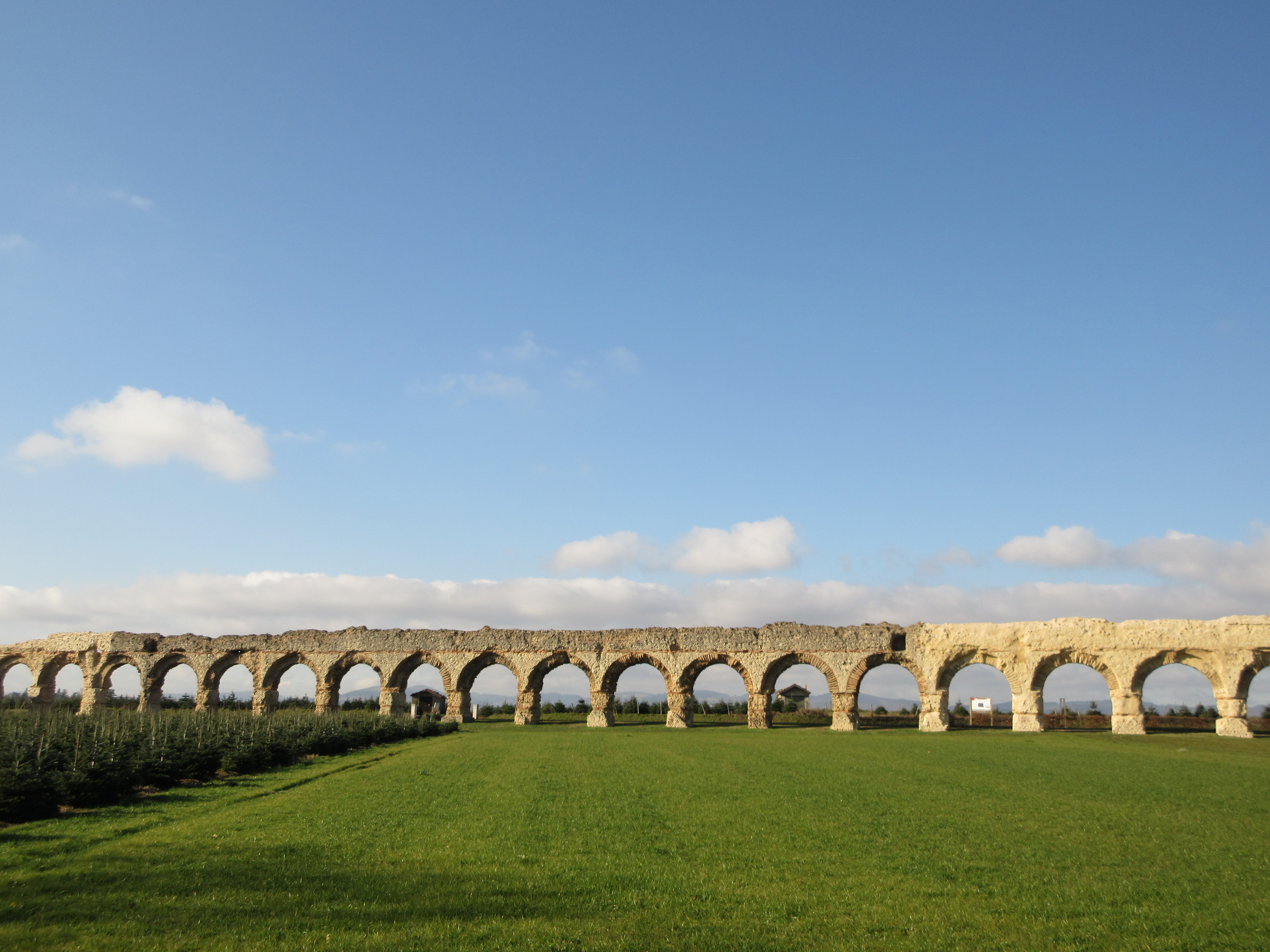
Vestiges of the Roman aqueduct in Chaponost

The Roman aqueduct of the Gier, estimated to be 75 km long, was built under Hadrian's reign during the second century CE to enable water supply of the Roman city of Lugdunum (Lyon) from Mont Pilat (source of the river Gier). Arches of the aqueducts (around 92 arches on 550 m) are located on the territory of the commune, at the site of "Le Plat de l'Air".

== Population ==
Historical population
Year	Pop.	±% p.a.
1968	3,638	—
1975	4,632	+3.51%
1982	5,278	+1.88%
1990	6,911	+3.43%
1999	7,832	+1.40%
2007	7,972	+0.22%
2012	7,963	−0.02%
2017	8,717	+1.83%
2023	9,382	+1.23%
Source: INSEE

== Twin towns ==
Chaponost is twinned with:

- Lesignano de' Bagni, Italy, since 2008

== See also ==
- Communes of the Rhône department
