= Brignais =

- Commune
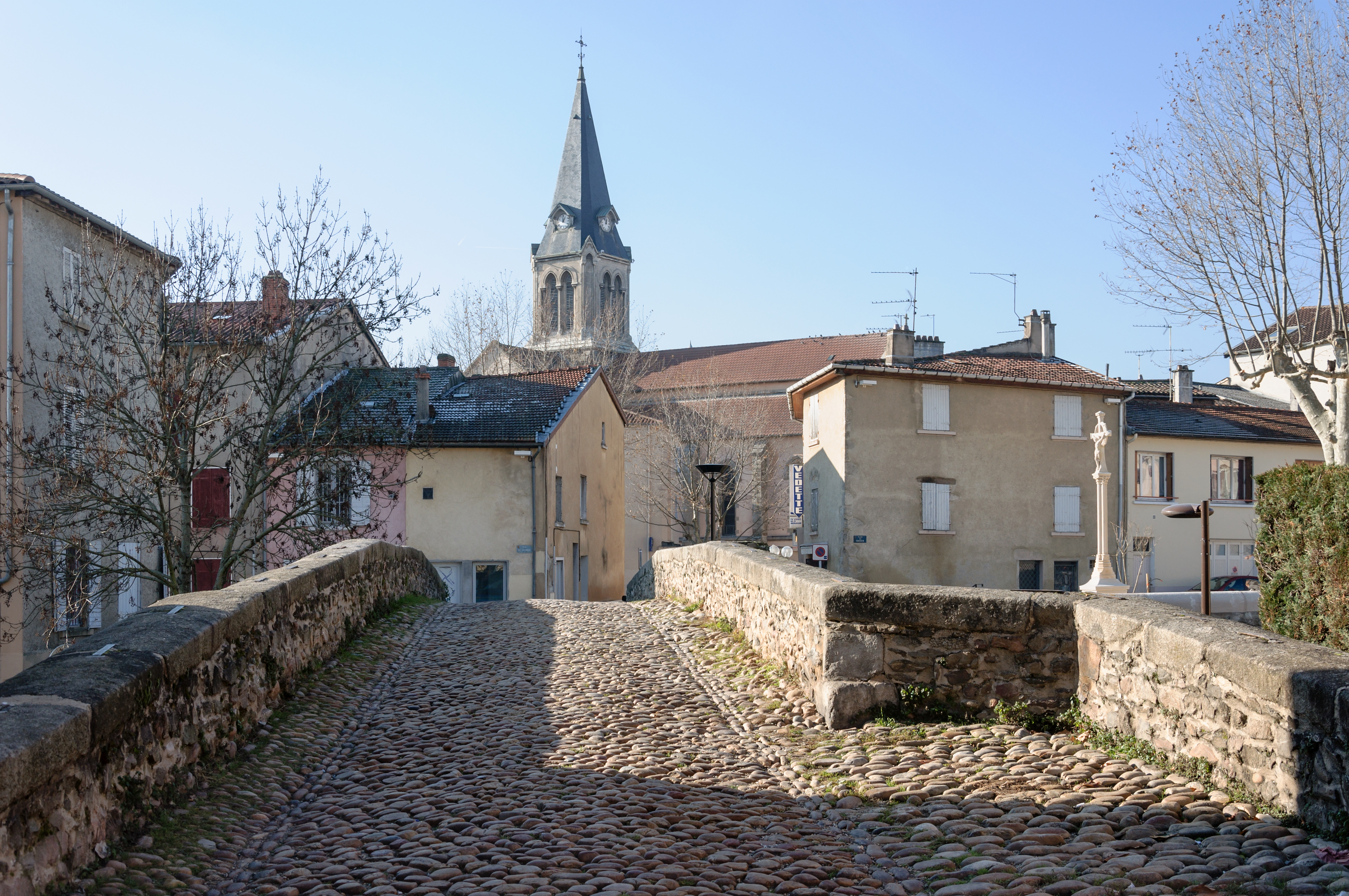
- Brignais seen from the old bridge

- Coat of arms
- Location of Brignais
- Location within France Location within Auvergne-Rhône-Alpes
- Coordinates: 45°40′29″N 4°45′18″E
- Country: France
- Region: Auvergne-Rhône-Alpes
- Department: Rhône
- Arrondissement: Lyon
- Canton: Brignais
- Intercommunality: CC de la Vallée du Garon

Government
  - Mayor (2020–2026): Serge Berard
- Area^{1}: 10.36 km^{2} (4.00 sq mi)
- Elevation: 300 m (980 ft)
- Highest elevation: 331 m (1,086 ft)
- Lowest elevation: 203 m (666 ft)
- Population (2023): 12,503
  - Density: 1,207/km^{2} (3,126/sq mi)
- Demonym: Brignarots
- Time zone: UTC+01:00 (CET)
  - Summer (DST): UTC+02:00 (CEST)
- INSEE/Postal code: 69027 /69530
- Website: brignais.com
- ^{1} French Land Register data, which excludes lakes, ponds, glaciers > 1 km^{2} (0.386 sq mi or 247 acres) and river estuaries.

Brignais (French pronunciation: [bʁiɲɛ]) is a commune in the Rhône department in central-eastern France. It is on the border with the Metropolis of Lyon.

== History ==
During the Hundred Years War, was the scene of the Battle of Brignais in April 1362 between the royal army of John II and an amalgamation of mercenary companies Tard-Venus (the late comers). These mercenaries had been made unemployed after the Treaty of Brétigny in 1360 and subsequent period of peace between England and France spanning 1360–1369. They had formed a Free company, one of many that plundered much of central and southern France. The battle lasting two days, led to a devastating defeat of the royal army with the death and capture of many of the senior commanders. The site of the battle is still called the Chemin des Tard-Venus.

== List of successive mayors ==
- 1944 - 1977 Peter Minssieux
- 1977 - 2006 Michel Thiers UDF
- 2006-current Paul Minssieux DVD

== Organisations ==
Brignais belongs to the community of municipalities of the Valley of Garon (CCVG).

== Population ==
Historical population
| Year | Pop. | ±% p.a. |
|---|---|---|
| 1968 | 3,922 | — |
| 1975 | 6,790 | +8.16% |
| 1982 | 9,564 | +5.02% |
| 1990 | 10,036 | +0.60% |
| 1999 | 11,207 | +1.23% |
| 2007 | 11,612 | +0.44% |
| 2012 | 11,390 | −0.39% |
| 2017 | 11,434 | +0.08% |
| 2023 | 12,503 | +1.50% |
Source: INSEE

== Transport ==
Brignais is served by Brignais station on the tram-train de l'ouest lyonnais network.

== Landmarks ==
- City Hall between 1901 and 1902:
- The park is a wooded area of three hectares, which sported a former mansion of the eighteenth century, became in 1985 the town hall. The inner courtyard and its old wells are located on the General de Gaulle Street.
- The house of the Jamayère.Presbytère
- Villa Giraudière: located south of the town center this was built about 1832. In 1996, it was acquired by the city of Brignais. The mansion has three floors with an area of 180 m² each. The basement consists of two vaults.
- Hospital Guy de Chauliac
- Guy de Chauliac, illustrious surgeon of the Middle Ages, one of the fathers of modern medicine, practiced in Brignais to 1330. A place bears his name, located in the historic district of the former hospital Brignais. This medieval infrastructure placed outside the walls of the city, formed a quadrangle between Brain Cold streets Giraudière, the Reach and Ro. It housed a pharmacy, a chapel under the patronage of St. Margaret, dependencies rooms, courtyards and gardens for walking sick.
- The old bridge (le Pont Vieux) over the river Garon: The present bridge dates back to the 12th century and comprises two stone arches each of four meters. During the Hundred Years' War the maintenance and repair of this bridge was much neglected. This led in 1399 to the bailiff of Mâcon, Seneschal of Lyon, forcing the inhabitants of Brignais and Vourles and to pay a tax to fix it. The road surface is composed of cobbles called "Cat Heads", the parapets and walls are composed of granite. It has been registered in the inventory of Historic Monuments of France since 1934.
- Maison Renaissance is one of the oldest houses in Brignais (also called Maison Forte) located at 11 Place Gamboni. and built in 1792. It has a spiral staircase behind the door.
- Church of St. Clair: Its first foundations date back to 1859. It was built in place of the Church of the feudal era and the old cemetery, dedicated to St. Clair (590-660), patron of the blind and visually impaired. It is through a public and common fund subscription, this church has been possible. The architect Clair Weaver, born in Sainte-Foy-lès-Lyon (author of the Littré Grand'Côte) and Father Rival, parish priest, govern the construction of the building. The structural work was completed in 1862. The building is both its architecture and its furnishings, a remarkable collection of Gothic style of the thirteenth century, revived the nineteenth day. The woodwork (pulpit, the confessionals and the choir stalls) are the work of sculptor Lyons Aubert. The bell, which dates from 1492, has been listed in the inventory of Historical Monuments November 27, 1905. The organ was built in 1972 by the Jura factors, Hartmann and Deloye to the monastery of the Benedictine nuns of Pradines (near Roanne) and remains in service until 1995.
- Roman aqueduct of Gier: remains located a little further down in the valley in Barret and Gerle path. Built in the 1st century, the aqueduct brought water to Pilat the capital of Gaul. The people of Lugdunum have long been powered by 75,000 m3 of water brought to them every day 200 km of pipes of four Roman aqueducts. This was the largest hydraulic system after that of Rome.

== Gallery ==
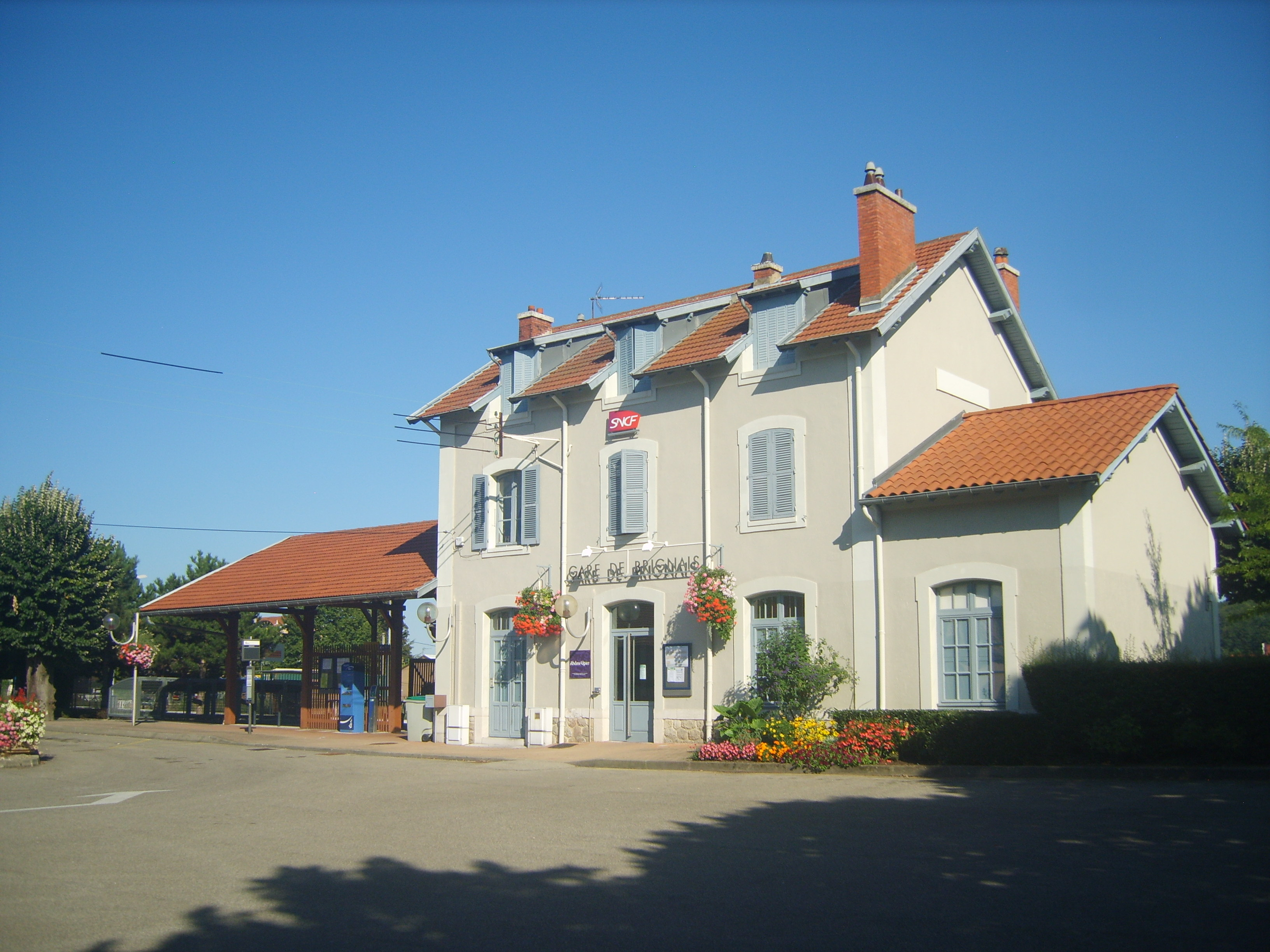
Train station

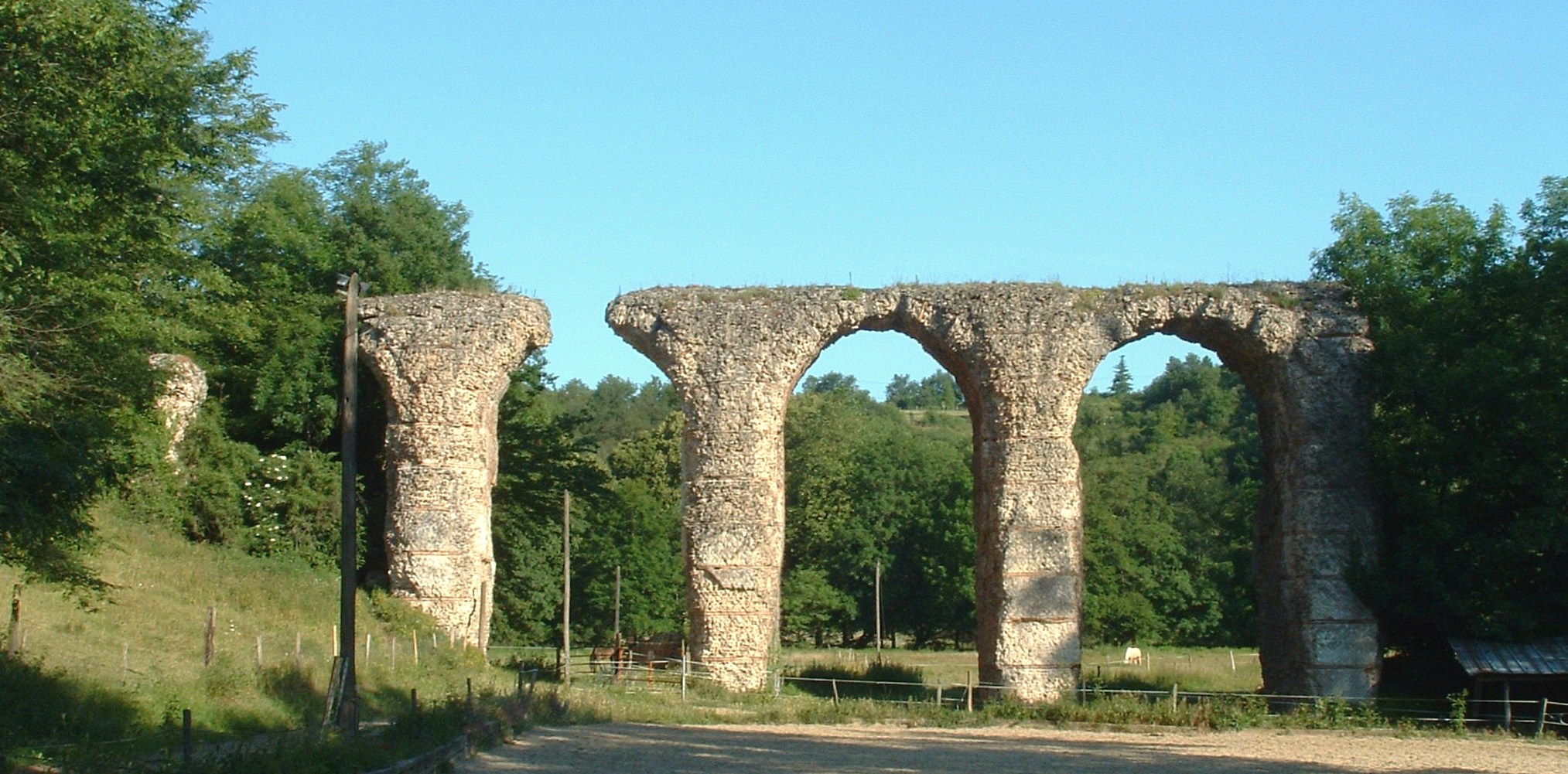
Gier Aqueduct

== See also ==
Communes of the Rhône department
