= Messimy =

- Commune
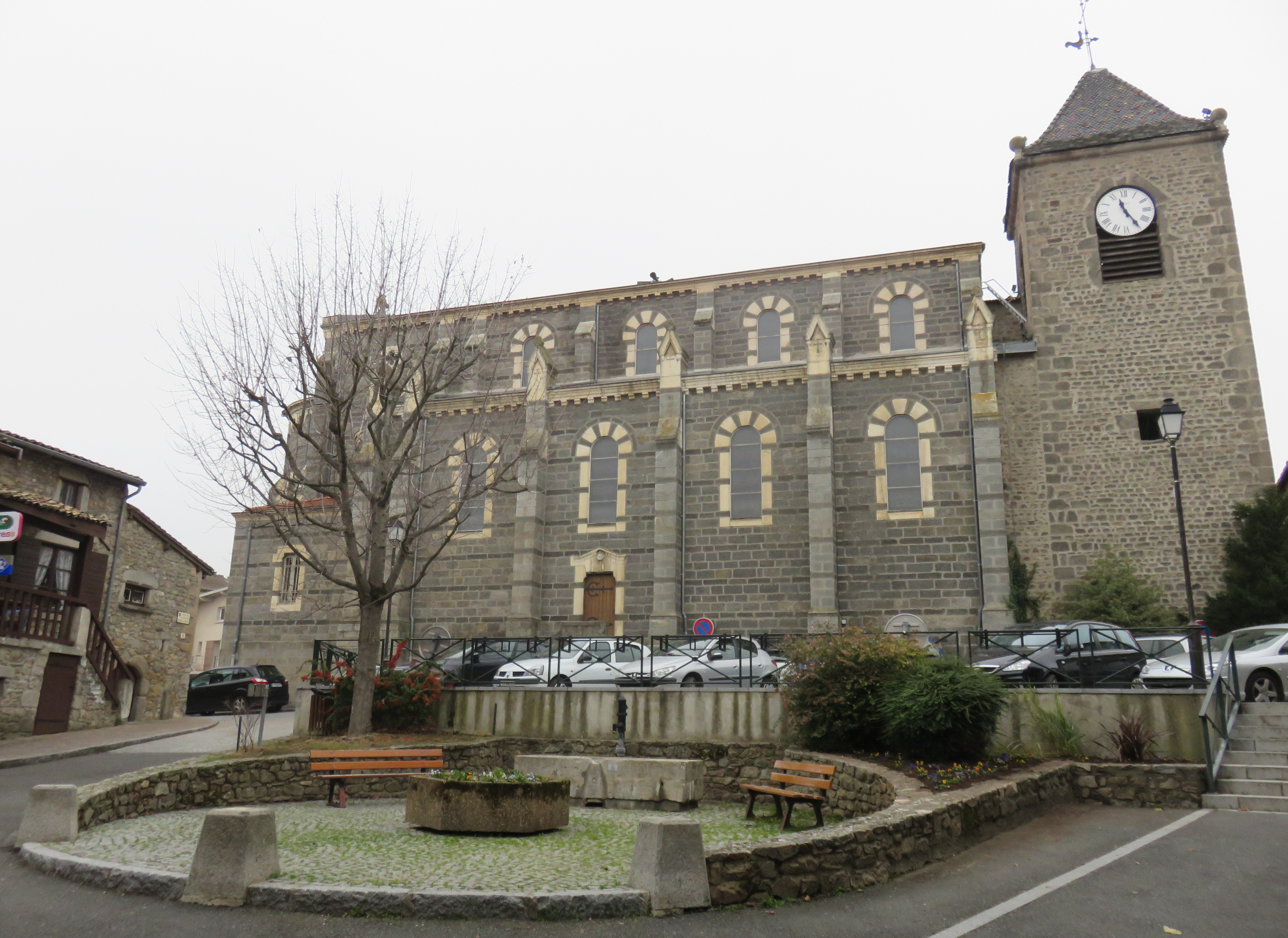
- The church of Messimy in 2017.

- Coat of arms
- Location of Messimy
- Location within France Location within Auvergne-Rhône-Alpes
- Coordinates: 45°41′56″N 4°40′29″E
- Country: France
- Region: Auvergne-Rhône-Alpes
- Department: Rhône
- Arrondissement: Lyon
- Canton: Brignais
- Intercommunality: CC des Vallons du Lyonnais

Government
  - Mayor (2020–2026): Marie-Agnès Berger
- Area^{1}: 11.1 km^{2} (4.3 sq mi)
- Elevation: 350 m (1,150 ft)
- Highest elevation: 606 m (1,988 ft)
- Lowest elevation: 257 m (843 ft)
- Population (2023): 3,546
  - Density: 319/km^{2} (827/sq mi)
- Demonym: Messimois
- Time zone: UTC+01:00 (CET)
  - Summer (DST): UTC+02:00 (CEST)
- INSEE/Postal code: 69131 /69510
- ^{1} French Land Register data, which excludes lakes, ponds, glaciers > 1 km^{2} (0.386 sq mi or 247 acres) and river estuaries.

Messimy (French pronunciation: [mɛsimi]) is a commune in the Rhône department in eastern France.

== Population ==
Historical population
Year	Pop.	±% p.a.
1968	1,154	—
1975	1,384	+2.63%
1982	1,605	+2.14%
1990	2,017	+2.90%
1999	2,696	+3.28%
2007	3,174	+2.06%
2012	3,356	+1.12%
2017	3,381	+0.15%
2023	3,546	+0.80%
Source: INSEE

== See also ==
- Communes of the Rhône department
