= Rhône's 10th constituency =

Constituency of the National Assembly of France

10th constituency of Rhône
- inline Constituency of the National Assembly of France

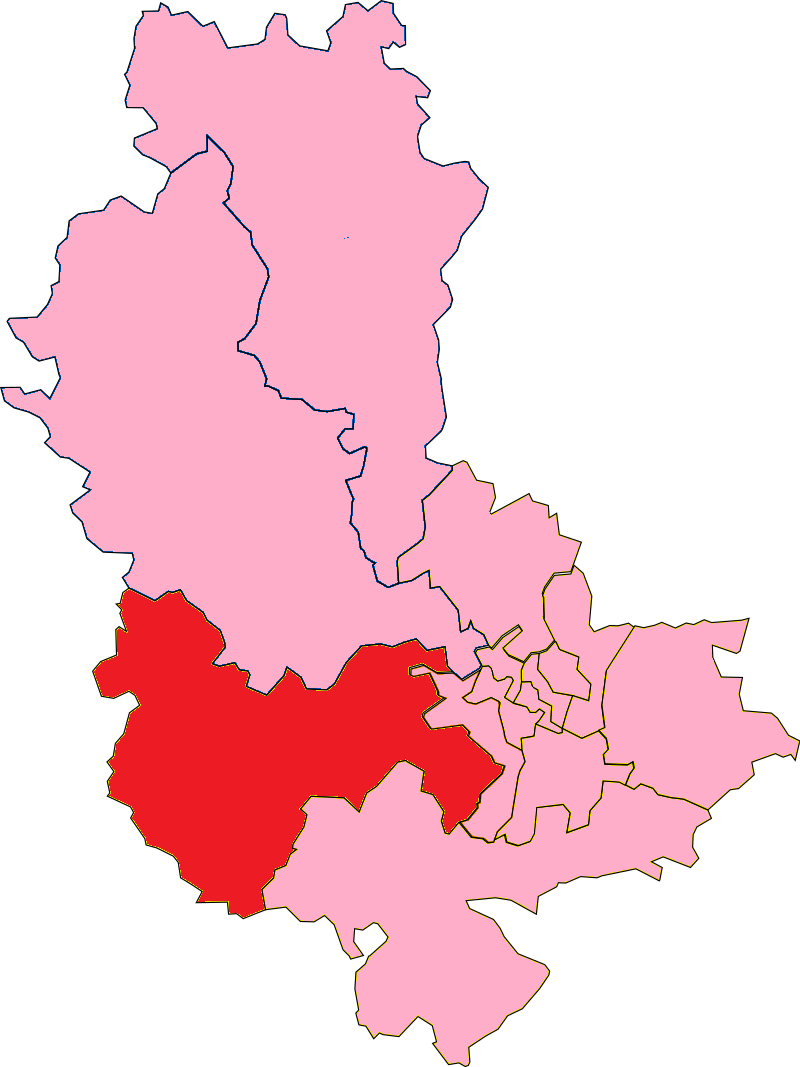
- Rhône's's 10th Constituency shown within Rhône
- Deputy: Thomas Gassilloud; RE
- Department: Rhône
- Cantons: Saint-Genis-Laval, Saint-Laurent-de-Chamousset, Saint-Symphorien-sur-Coise, Vaugneray
- Registered voters: 95268

The 10th constituency of the Rhône (French: Dixième circonscription du Rhône) is a French legislative constituency in the Rhône département. Like the other 576 French constituencies, it elects one MP using a two round electoral system.

== Description ==
The 10th constituency of the Rhône is located to the west of Lyon. It includes the suburb of Saint-Genis-Laval on the western bank of the Rhône as well as some more sparsely populated rural areas further from the city.

Until 2017 the voters of the 10th had consistently returned conservative deputies to the National Assembly.

== Assembly members ==
Election	Member	Party
1988	Jean Besson	RPR
1993	Jean Besson	RPR
1997	Jean Besson	RPR
2002	Jean Besson	UMP
2003	Christophe Guilloteau	UMP
2007	Christophe Guilloteau	UMP
2012	Christophe Guilloteau	UMP
2017	Thomas Gassilloud	LREM
2022	Thomas Gassilloud	Agir
2024	Thomas Gassilloud	RE

== Election results ==
=== 2024 ===
Legislative Election 2024: Rhône's 10th constituency
Party	Candidate	Votes	%	±%
LR	Sophie Cruz	6,689	9.08	−6.99
RN	Cécile Patout	22,942	31.15	N/A
RE (Ensemble)	Thomas Gassilloud	23,964	32.54	−3.56
REC	Irène Berenyi-Geley	788	1.07	−10.24
DVD	David Hornus	1,296	1.76	N/A
LO	Gilles Bompard	551	0.75	N/A
PS (NFP)	Florence Perrin	17,412	23.64	+1.08
Turnout		73,642	98.28	+45.56
Registered electors		99,044		
2nd round result
RE	Thomas Gassilloud	45,099	62.93	=0.58
RN	Cécile Patout	26,562	37.07	N/A
Turnout		71,661	96.20	+46.62
Registered electors		99,067		
RE hold		Swing		

=== 2022 ===
Legislative Election 2022: Rhone's 10th constituency
Party	Candidate	Votes	%	±%
Agir (Ensemble)	Thomas Gassilloud	18,630	36.10	-15.56
PS (NUPÉS)	Michèle Edery	11,640	22.56	+5.99
LR (UDC)	Sophie Cruz	8,295	16.07	−3.33
REC	Agnès Marion	5,834	11.31	N/A
DLF (RPR)	Gerbert Rambaud	4,063	7.87	+6.41
DVE	Xavier Ulubas	1,597	3.09	N/A
Others	N/A	1,543	-	−
Turnout		51,602	52.72	+0.47
2nd round result
Agir (Ensemble)	Thomas Gassilloud	30,089	65.31	+1.48
PS (NUPÉS)	Michèle Edery	15,985	34.69	N/A
Turnout		46,074	49.58	+9.30
Agir gain from LREM				

=== 2017 ===
Legislative Election 2017: Rhône's 10th constituency
Party	Candidate	Votes	%	±%
LREM	Thomas Gassilloud	23,230	46.66	
LR	Sophie Cruz	9,658	19.40	
FN	Agnès Marion	5,865	11.78	
LFI	Olivier Daude	4,763	9.57	
EELV	Victor Fornito	3,020	6.07	
Others	N/A	3,249		
Turnout		49,785	52.25	
2nd round result
LREM	Thomas Gassilloud	24,498	63.83	
LR	Sophie Cruz	13,880	36.17	
Turnout		38,378	40.28	
LREM gain from LR				

=== 2012 ===
Legislative Election 2012: Rhône's 10th constituency
Party	Candidate	Votes	%	±%
UMP	Christophe Guilloteau	22,175	40.94	
PS	Florence Perrin	14,080	25.99	
FN	Agnès Marion	8,195	15.13	
MoDem	Roland Crimier	3,023	5.58	
EELV	Véronique Hartmann	2,704	4.99	
FG	Hélène Troncin	1,860	3.43	
Others	N/A	2,130		
Turnout		54,167	60.51	
2nd round result
UMP	Christophe Guilloteau	29,432	59.85	
PS	Florence Perrin	19,745	40.15	
Turnout		49,177	54.94	
UMP hold				

=== 2007 ===
Legislative Election 2007: Rhône's 10th constituency
Party	Candidate	Votes	%	±%
UMP	Christophe Guilloteau	26,708	47.84	
PS	Florence Perrin	9,964	17.85	
MoDem	Yves Hartemann	7,309	13.09	
DVD	Georges Barriol	3,473	6.22	
LV	Jean-Charles Kohlhaas	2,480	4.44	
FN	Agnès Marion	2,407	4.31	
Others	N/A	3,485		
Turnout		56,333	62.73	
2nd round result
UMP	Christophe Guilloteau	32,514	63.99	
PS	Florence Perrin	18,295	36.01	
Turnout		52,275	58.21	
UMP hold				

=== 2002 ===
Legislative Election 2002: Rhône's 10th constituency
Party	Candidate	Votes	%	±%
UMP	Jean Besson	21,950	40.69	
LV	Jean-Charles Kohlhaas	10,694	19.82	
FN	Marie Chameau	6,420	11.90	
DVD	Yves Hartemann	5,831	10.81	
DVD	Pierre Delacroix	3,368	6.24	
PCF	Gilles Pereyron	1,170	2.17	
LCR	Christiane Bert	1,142	2.12	
Others	N/A	3,368		
Turnout		54,779	67.20	
2nd round result
UMP	Jean Besson	29,651	65.40	
LV	Jean-Charles Kohlhaas	15,689	34.60	
Turnout		46,875	57.50	
UMP hold				

=== 1997 ===
Legislative Election 1997: Rhône's 10th constituency
Party	Candidate	Votes	%	±%
RPR	Jean Besson	19,493	40.49	
PS	Christian Bonnet	9,644	20.02	
FN	Jean-Paul Veyrard	8,117	16.85	
LV	Marguerite Chichereau	3,168	6.58	
PCF	Gilles Pereyron	2,497	5.18	
DVD	Yves Cuerq	2,173	4.51	
GE	Jean-Paul Desroches	1,549	3.22	
DIV	Gilles Dabonot	1,039	2.16	
Others	N/A	491		
Turnout		50,596	68.92	
2nd round result
RPR	Jean Besson	30,454	62.55	
PS	Christian Bonnet	18,235	37.45	
Turnout		52,698	70.42	
RPR hold				
