= Val-d'Oise's 9th constituency =

Constituency of the French Fifth Republic

9th constituency of Val-d'Oise
- inline Constituency of the National Assembly of France

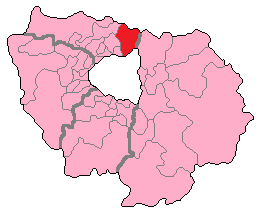
- Val-d'Oise's 9th Constituency shown within Île-de-France
- Deputy: Arnaud Le Gall; LFI
- Department: Val-d'Oise
- Cantons: Gonesse - Goussainville - Luzarches
- Registered voters: 69,985

The 9th constituency of Val-d'Oise is a French legislative constituency in the Val-d'Oise département. It is currently represented by Zivka Park of La République En Marche! (LREM).

== Description ==
The 9th constituency of Val-d'Oise covers the eastern end of the department and is centred on the town of Goussainville which lies close to Charles de Gaulle Airport.

Since 1988 the seat has swung between left and right and has only been retained by the incumbent once during that time, by the PS in 2002.

== Historic Representation ==
Election	Member	Party
1986	Proportional representation – no election by constituency	
1988	Michel Coffineau	PS
1993	Marcel Porcher	RPR
1997	Jean-Pierre Blazy	PS
2002	Jean-Pierre Blazy	PS
2007	Yanick Paternotte	UMP
2012	Jean-Pierre Blazy	PS
2017	Zivka Park	LREM
2022	Arnaud Le Gall	LFI

== Election results ==
=== 2024 ===
Candidate	Party	Alliance	First round			Second round		
Candidate	Party	Alliance	Votes	%	+/–	Votes	%	+/–
Arnaud Le Gall	LFI	NFP	17,157	40.73	+11.60	23,918	60.27	
Agnès Marion	RN		12,872	30.56	+10.17	15,764	39.73	
Elisa Demir	RE	ENS	6,149	14.60	-5.45			
Anthony Arciero	LR		4,789	11.37	-1.44			
Danièle Hanryon	LO		621	1.47	+0.48			
David Said	REC		381	0.90	-4.09			
Nsimba Wassa	DIV		157	0.37	N/A			
Vanessa Ronchini	NPA		0	0.00	N/A			
Mohamed Najib	DVG		0	0.00	N/A			
Valid votes			42,126	97.59	+0.04	39,682	92.32	
Blank votes			711	1.65	-0.05	2,560	5.96	
Null votes			331	0.77	+0.01	740	1.72	
Turnout			43,168	60.28	+22.42	42,982	59.99	
Abstentions			28,446	39.72	-22.42	28,662	40.01	
Registered voters			71,614			71,644		
Source: Ministry of the Interior, Le Monde
Result						LFI HOLD		

=== 2022 ===
Legislative Election 2022: Val-d'Oise's 9th constituency
Party	Candidate	Votes	%	±%
LFI (NUPÉS)	Arnaud Le Gall	7,583	29.13	+5.73
RN	Jean-Baptiste Marly	5,309	20.39	+5.04
LREM (Ensemble)	Zivka Park	5,219	20.05	−8.89
LR (UDC)	Anthony Arciero	3,335	12.81	−3.01
REC	Sylvain Saragosa	1,300	4.99	N/A
DVG	Jean-Marc Lussot	1,071	4.11	N/A
PRG	Sympson Ndala	538	2.07	N/A
Others	N/A	1,678		
Turnout		26,688	37.86	−0.47
2nd round result
LFI (NUPÉS)	Arnaud Le Gall	13,432	56.42	N/A
RN	Jean-Baptiste Marly	10,377	43.58	N/A
Turnout		23,809	37.56	+6.97
LFI gain from LREM				

=== 2017 ===
Candidate	Label	First round		Second round	
Candidate	Label	Votes	%	Votes	%
Zivka Park	REM	7,571	28.94	9,791	51.67
Anthony Arciero	LR	4,138	15.82	9,158	48.33
Mikael Sala	FN	4,015	15.35		
Véronique Danet-Dupuis	FI	3,091	11.81		
Abdelaziz Hamida	DVG	1,507	5.76		
Luc Broussy	PS	1,404	5.37		
Dominique Dufumier	ECO	819	3.13		
Thierry Chiabodo	PCF	809	3.09		
Adeline Roldao-Martins	UDI	759	2.90		
Denis Vigouroux	DLF	680	2.60		
Sophie Rueg	DIV	342	1.31		
Danièle Hanryon	EXG	231	0.88		
Marie Cléro	DIV	205	0.78		
Karim Ouchikh	EXD	177	0.68		
Luc-Éric Krief	DVD	124	0.47		
Yann Hervet	DVG	108	0.41		
Mohamed Najib	EXG	87	0.33		
Phi Son Nguyen	DIV	56	0.21		
Gérald Todaro	DIV	41	0.16		
Votes		26,164	100.00	18,949	100.00
Valid votes		26,164	97.52	18,949	88.50
Blank votes		456	1.70	1,768	8.26
Null votes		208	0.78	694	3.24
Turnout		26,828	38.33	21,411	30.59
Abstentions		43,157	61.67	48,574	69.41
Registered voters		69,985		69,985	
Source: Ministry of the Interior

=== 2012 ===
Legislative Election 2012: Val-d'Oise's 9th constituency
Party	Candidate	Votes	%	±%
PS	Jean-Pierre Blazy	13,468	40.31	
UMP	Yanick Paternotte	8,720	26.10	
FN	Lydie Dubois	6,163	18.44	
FG	Pierre Barros	2,309	6.91	
DVG	Mohammed Hakkou	714	2.14	
Others	N/A	2,041		
Turnout		33,415	49.26	
2nd round result
PS	Jean-Pierre Blazy	18,257	55.96	
UMP	Yanick Paternotte	14,367	44.04	
Turnout		32,624	48.09	
PS gain from UMP				

=== 2007 ===
Legislative Election 2007: Val-d'Oise's 9th constituency
Party	Candidate	Votes	%	±%
UMP	Yanick Paternotte	13,710	39.55	
PS	Jean-Pierre Blazy	10,010	28.88	
MoDem	Guy Messager	4,191	12.09	
FN	Thérèsa Brochard	1,850	5.34	
PCF	Thierry Chiabodo	1,850	5.34	
Far left	Catherine Jegou	911	2.63	
Others	N/A	2,328		
Turnout		35,236	53.92	
2nd round result
UMP	Yanick Paternotte	17,051	50.43	
PS	Jean-Pierre Blazy	16,761	49.57	
Turnout		34,705	53.10	
UMP gain from PS				

=== 2002 ===
Legislative Election 2002: Val-d'Oise's 9th constituency
Party	Candidate	Votes	%	±%
PS	Jean-Pierre Blazy	11,823	34.42	
UMP	Elisabeth Hermanville	10,426	30.35	
FN	Marie-Odile Bontemps	5,935	17.28	
DVD	Bernard Messeant	1,104	3.21	
LV	Anne Boudou	880	2.56	
Others	N/A	4,182		
Turnout		35,118	60.48	
2nd round result
PS	Jean-Pierre Blazy	16,939	54.57	
UMP	Elisabeth Hermanville	14,100	45.43	
Turnout		32,625	56.19	
PS hold				

=== 1997 ===
Legislative Election 1997: Val-d'Oise's 9th constituency
Party	Candidate	Votes	%	±%
RPR	Marcel Porcher	9,064	25.13	
PS	Jean-Pierre Blazy	8,912	24.71	
FN	Yves de Coatgoureden	8,029	22.26	
PCF	Michel Toumazet	5,443	15.09	
LO	Johan Carey	1,170	3.24	
GE	André Korchia	972	2.70	
DVD	Daniel Toussaint	831	2.30	
DVE	Albert Lapeyre	782	2.17	
Others	N/A	860		
Turnout		37,542	66.88	
2nd round result
PS	Jean-Pierre Blazy	17,869	45.92	
RPR	Marcel Porcher	14,598	37.51	
FN	Yves de Coatgoureden	6,449	16.57	
Turnout		40,220	71.66	
PS gain from RPR				

== Sources ==
Official results of French elections from 2002: "Résultats électoraux officiels en France" (in French).
