= Grézieu-la-Varenne =

- Commune
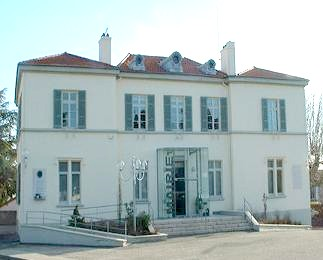
- The town hall in Grézieu-la-Varenne

- Coat of arms
- Location of Grézieu-la-Varenne
- Location within France Location within Auvergne-Rhône-Alpes
- Coordinates: 45°44′54″N 4°41′28″E
- Country: France
- Region: Auvergne-Rhône-Alpes
- Department: Rhône
- Arrondissement: Lyon
- Canton: Brignais
- Intercommunality: Vallons du Lyonnais

Government
  - Mayor (2020–2026): Bernard Romier
- Area^{1}: 7.45 km^{2} (2.88 sq mi)
- Highest elevation: 589 m (1,932 ft)
- Lowest elevation: 240 m (790 ft)
- Population (2023): 6,472
  - Density: 869/km^{2} (2,250/sq mi)
- Demonym(s): Grézirottes, Grézirots
- Time zone: UTC+01:00 (CET)
  - Summer (DST): UTC+02:00 (CEST)
- INSEE/Postal code: 69094 /69290
- Website: http://www.mairie-grezieulavarenne.fr
- ^{1} French Land Register data, which excludes lakes, ponds, glaciers > 1 km^{2} (0.386 sq mi or 247 acres) and river estuaries.

Grézieu-la-Varenne (French pronunciation: [ɡʁezjø la vaʁɛn]) is a commune in the Rhône department in eastern France.

== Population ==
Historical population
Year	Pop.	±% p.a.
1968	1,849	—
1975	2,323	+3.31%
1982	2,855	+2.99%
1990	3,256	+1.66%
1999	4,133	+2.69%
2007	4,751	+1.76%
2012	5,227	+1.93%
2017	5,734	+1.87%
2023	6,472	+2.04%
Source: INSEE

== See also ==
- Communes of the Rhône department
