= Brindas =

- Commune
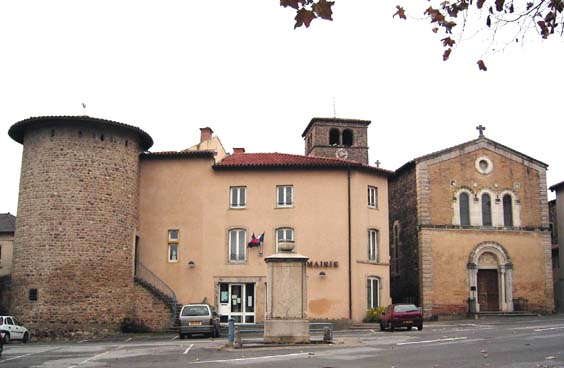
- Left to right: The tower, the town hall and the church

- Coat of arms
- Location of Brindas
- Location within France Location within Auvergne-Rhône-Alpes
- Coordinates: 45°43′19″N 4°41′39″E
- Country: France
- Region: Auvergne-Rhône-Alpes
- Department: Rhône
- Arrondissement: Lyon
- Canton: Brignais
- Intercommunality: Vallons du Lyonnais

Government
  - Mayor (2020–2026): Frédéric Jean
- Area^{1}: 11.27 km^{2} (4.35 sq mi)
- Elevation: 326 m (1,070 ft)
- Highest elevation: 371 m (1,217 ft)
- Lowest elevation: 232 m (761 ft)
- Population (2023): 6,775
  - Density: 601.2/km^{2} (1,557/sq mi)
- Time zone: UTC+01:00 (CET)
  - Summer (DST): UTC+02:00 (CEST)
- INSEE/Postal code: 69028 /69126
- ^{1} French Land Register data, which excludes lakes, ponds, glaciers > 1 km^{2} (0.386 sq mi or 247 acres) and river estuaries.

Brindas (French pronunciation: [bʁɛ̃da]) is a commune of the Rhône department in eastern France.

== Geography ==
It lies about 15 km (9,5 mi) South-West of Lyon, but not included in the Metropolis of Lyon.

== History ==
Brindas is often regarded as the second home of Guignol, a French puppet show from Lyon. The name of the village was often quoted in parts of Guignol plays as several Guignol entertainers used to spend holiday time in this village. Pierre Neichthauser, mayor of Brindas from 1929 until 1940, was also the puppeteer for the character Gnafron in his Guignol Mourguet theatre.

A Guignol museum-theater ("Musée-théâtre Guignol") was opened in Brindas in 2008 (year of Guignol's bicentenary).

== Population ==
Historical population
Year	Pop.	±% p.a.
1968	1,560	—
1975	2,097	+4.32%
1982	3,204	+6.24%
1990	3,555	+1.31%
1999	4,555	+2.79%
2007	5,341	+2.01%
2012	5,651	+1.13%
2017	6,174	+1.79%
2023	6,775	+1.56%
Source: INSEE

== See also ==
Communes of the Rhône department
