= Railway concessions in France =

Delegation of lines to a private company

The railway concession is a fairly old system where the construction, operation, and management of a railway line, whose ownership remains with the public grantor, typically the State, are delegated to a private partner. This contractual system is similar to the public service concession, but differs somewhat from public–private partnerships (PPP) and should not be confused with railway franchises, which concern the operation of transport services on a railway line.

== Principle ==
The State owns the railway infrastructure, either directly or through one of its public entities, as is the case in France with SNCF Réseau. The awarding of a concession by the granting authority must involve a call for tenders and a competitive bidding process. Candidates are typically consortia of companies from the construction industry or railway sector, such as Eurotunnel or Veolia Transdev, partnered with the banking sector. The various candidates compete based on the bids they submit to the granting authority. This is a monopsony, with a single buyer facing multiple suppliers. The concession is then awarded to the best bid through a contract with precisely defined terms (amount of public subsidies, duration of the concession, risk-sharing, etc.).

The railway infrastructure manager makes its railway property available: it transfers all the patrimonial rights and obligations of the owner, except for the right of ownership and the right to alienate. The economic risks are then borne by the concessionaire, though a risk-sharing arrangement may be included in the concession contract. Financing may be renegotiated during the concession or at its expiration. The concession contract may set a profit ceiling for the concessionaire, beyond which the surplus is transferred to the public grantor. The concessionaire is obligated to open its line or section of line to all trains at the same price, though it may prioritize its own trains over those of competitors. If the company undermines competition, the concession may be revoked before the contract’s end, and it may be liable for damages.

== Difference between concession and partnership contract ==
In the context of a concession, the private operator (the concessionaire) bears the majority of the project’s risk. This financial risk stems from the “traffic risk,” as the concessionaire is directly remunerated by users, in this case, the railway undertakings that use the conceded line with their trains in exchange for tolls. The concession contract may also include the operation of transport services, in which case the concessionaire and operator are the same entity, which must still bear the risk of train ridership.

The partnership contract differs from the concession in the way risks are shared between the public and private sectors. In this case, the risk-sharing logic aims to be optimal, and the traffic risk is borne by the public sector. The private consortium is remunerated by the public contracting authority through rents based on predetermined performance criteria. Thus, in the context of partnership contracts signed by SNCF Réseau, the public company collects tolls for train operations and pays regular rent to the private operator responsible for constructing, operating, and maintaining the infrastructure.

== Railway concessions in France ==
=== Current French concessions ===
- The Trans-Channel fixed link concession

The French and British governments signed a treaty in Canterbury on 12 February 1986, enabling the construction and operation of a fixed link connecting the two sides of the Channel by a consortium of private companies under a concession. The concession was awarded to the concessionaire company, named Groupe Eurotunnel. It was established on 15 August 1986 and includes French and British banks and construction groups.

- The Lyon Saint-Exupéry LESLYS express link

LESLYS is an express tramway line connecting Lyon–Saint-Exupéry Airport to central Lyon at the Part-Dieu station. The Departmental Council of Rhône, as the organizing authority for non-urban passenger transport in the department, decided in 2001, in collaboration with SYTRAL, to create a rail link between Lyon and its airport. It was decided that the line would largely share its infrastructure (from Lyon to Meyzieu ZI) with the Line 3 tramway project, following the route of the former Chemin de fer de l'Est de Lyon, owned by the Department. The urban section of the line between Lyon and Meyzieu was built as part of the T3 project, but for the new section between Meyzieu and the airport, the General Council opted for a concession model covering the construction and management of the infrastructure, as well as the operation of the transport service across the entire line

- The Sud Europe Atlantique high-speed line

Following the commissioning in September 1990 of the Atlantique high-speed line between Paris and Saint-Pierre-des-Corps, near Tours, discussions began to extend the line toward Bordeaux. The high-speed rail master plan of April 1992 included a project called LGV Aquitaine to connect Saint-Pierre-des-Corps to Bordeaux. The public debate was held from 1994 to 1995, which then allowed preliminary studies for the Tours–Bordeaux section to begin. The public inquiry prior to the declaration of public utility was divided into two sections: Tours to Angoulême and Angoulême to Bordeaux, conducted in 2007 and 2005, respectively. On 18 July 2006, the declaration of public utility for the Angoulême–Bordeaux section was decreed, and that for the Tours–Angoulême section was decreed on 10 June 2009.

== See also ==
- History of rail transport in France
- Réseau Ferré de France
- Railway undertaking
