= Christophe Guilloteau =

French politician (born 1958)

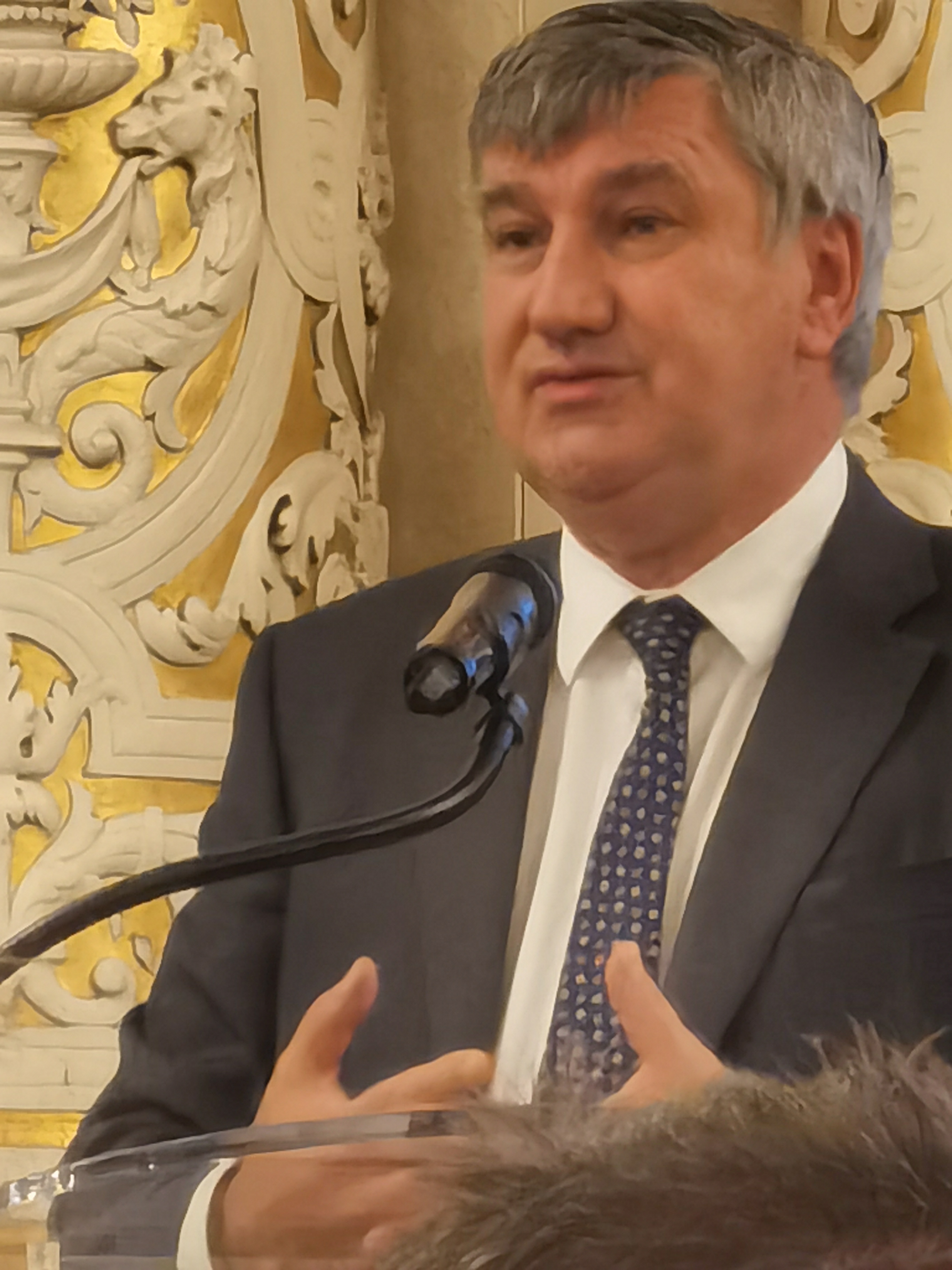
- Guilloteau in 2021

President of the Departmental Council of Rhône
- Incumbent
- Assumed office 2 April 2015
- Preceded by: Danielle Chuzeville

Member of the National Assembly for Rhône's 10th constituency
- In office 25 June 2003 – 20 June 2017
- Preceded by: Jean Besson
- Succeeded by: Thomas Gassilloud

Member of the Regional Council of Rhône-Alpes
- In office 15 March 1998 – 12 April 2008

Personal details
- Born: Christophe François Michel Guilloteau; 18 June 1958 (age 67) Lyon, France
- Party: The Republicans (2015–present)
- Other political affiliations: Rally for the Republic (until 2002); Union for a Popular Movement (2002–2015)

Christophe François Michel Guilloteau (French pronunciation: [kʁistɔf ɡijɔto]; born 18 June 1958) is a French politician who has served as President of the Departmental Council of Rhône since 2015. A member of The Republicans (LR), he also represented the 10th constituency of Rhône in the National Assembly from 2003 to 2017.

Guilloteau was first elected to the General Council of Rhône for the canton of Saint-Genis-Laval in 2008. In 2015, he was elected to the newly-named Departmental Council of Rhône for the newly-created canton of Brignais. These elections were the first in Rhône following the establishment of the Metropolis of Lyon on 1 January 2015 and the abolishment of the cantons therein.

Prior to his election to the General Council, Guilloteau was a municipal councillor in Belleville (1983–1995) and in Vaugneray (2001–2003). He was also a member of the Regional Council of Rhône-Alpes from 1998 to 2008.
