= Arnaud Le Gall =

French politician (born 1980)

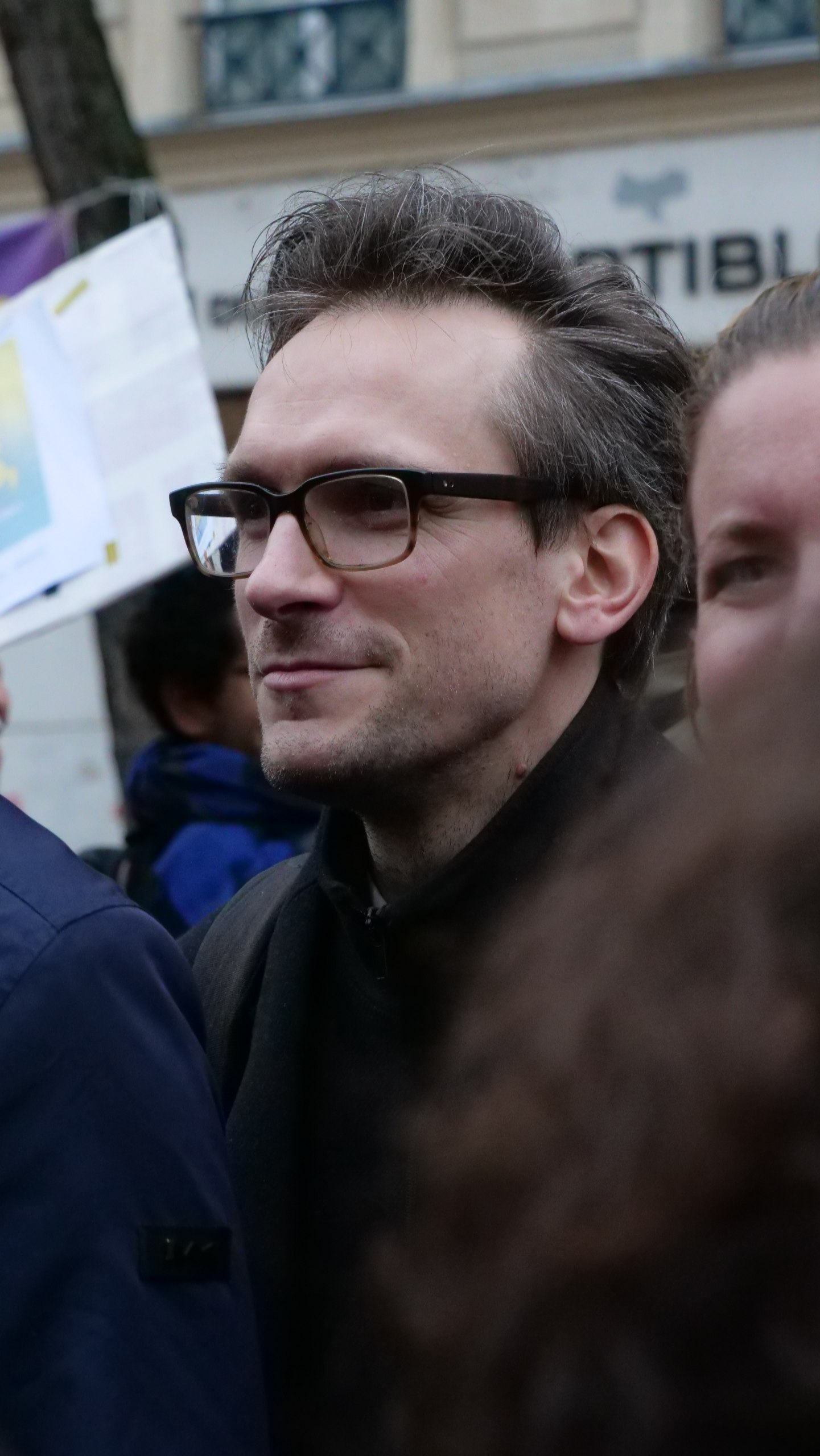
- Arnaud Le Gall in 2024

Member of the National Assembly for Val-d'Oise's 9th constituency
- In office 22 June 2022 – 9 June 2024
- Preceded by: Zivka Park
- Succeeded by: to be elected

Personal details
- Born: 29 November 1980 (age 45) Carhaix-Plouguer, Finistère, France
- Party: La France Insoumise
- Other political affiliations: NUPES (2022); NFP (2024)

Arnaud Le Gall (born 29 November 1980) is a French politician of La France Insoumise who has been representing Val-d'Oise's 9th constituency in the National Assembly since 2022. In the 2022 French legislative election he unseated En Marche MP Zivka Park.

== See also ==
- List of deputies of the 16th National Assembly of France
