= Agnès Marion =

French politician (born 1977)

Regional Councillor of Auvergne-Rhône-Alpes
- In office 1 January 2016 – 27 June 2021

Personal details
- Born: 7 June 1977 (age 48) Sallanches, France
- Party: National Rally (1997–2021, 2024–present)
- Other political affiliations: Reconquête (2021–2024)

Agnès Marion (born 7 June 1977) is a French politician of the National Rally. She was a member of the Regional Council of Auvergne-Rhône-Alpes from 2016 to 2021, and a member of the municipal council of Lyon from 2014 to 2020.

== Career ==
Marion was born in Sallanches and grew up in Avignon. She went to university in Lyon, where she obtained a master's degree in classical and modern literature, and joined the National Front Youth as a student in 1997. In 2007, she was asked by Bruno Gollnisch to run in the French legislative election, and contested Rhône's 10th constituency. She was a candidate for the same constituency in the 2012 legislative election. She was elected municipal councillor of Lyon in the 2014 municipal elections, and regional councillor of Auvergne-Rhône-Alpes in the 2015 regional elections. In the 2017 legislative election, she was a candidate for Rhône's 10th constituency, and in the 2020 municipal elections, she was a candidate for mayor of Lyon.

In 2021, Marion switched to Reconquête. She was the party's candidate in Rhône's 10th constituency in the 2022 legislative election, and its seventh-place candidate in the 2024 European Parliament election. In June 2024 she returned to the National Rally, and was its candidate for Val-d'Oise's 9th constituency in the 2024 legislative election.
