= Zivka Park =

French politician

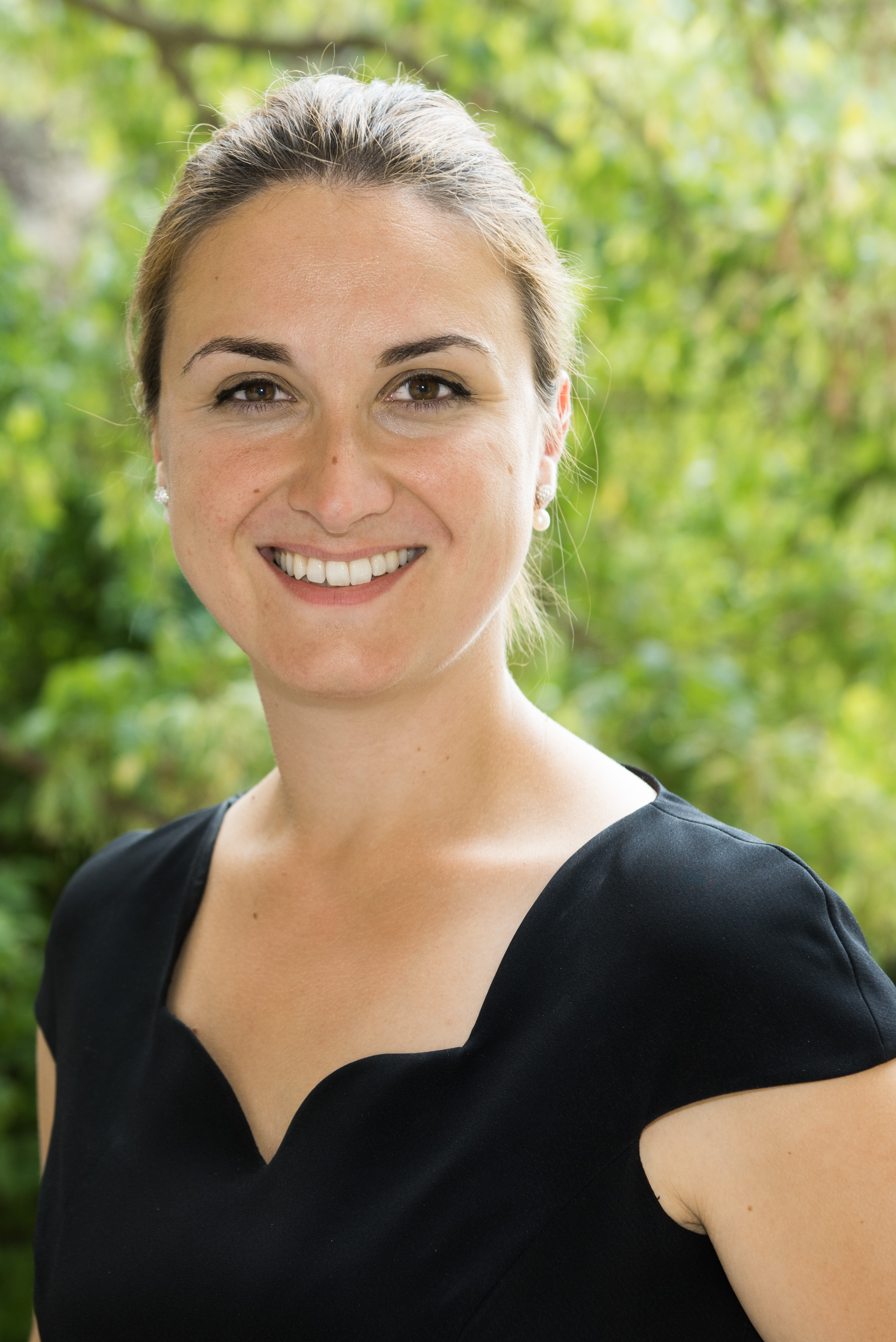

Member of the National Assembly for Val d'Oise's 9th constituency
- In office 21 June 2017 – 21 June 2022
- Preceded by: Jean-Pierre Blazy
- Succeeded by: Arnaud Le Gall

Personal details
- Born: 21 January 1985 (age 41) Aubervilliers, France
- Party: La République En Marche! (2017–present)
- Profession: Politician

Zivka Park (born 21 January 1985) is a French politician who served as a member of the National Assembly for the 9th constituency of the Val-d'Oise department from 2017 to 2022. She is a member of La République En Marche! (LREM).

== Political career ==
In parliament, Park served as the Committee on Sustainable Development and Regional Planning member. In addition to her committee assignments, she was part of the French-Serbian Parliamentary Friendship Group. In 2020, Park joined En commun (EC), a group within LREM led by Barbara Pompili.

Park lost her seat in the first round of the 2022 French legislative election. The constituency was won in the second round by Maxime Laisney from La France Insoumise.

== Other activities ==
- SNCF, Member of the Supervisory Board

== See also ==
- 2017 French legislative election
