= Arrondissements of the Rhône department =

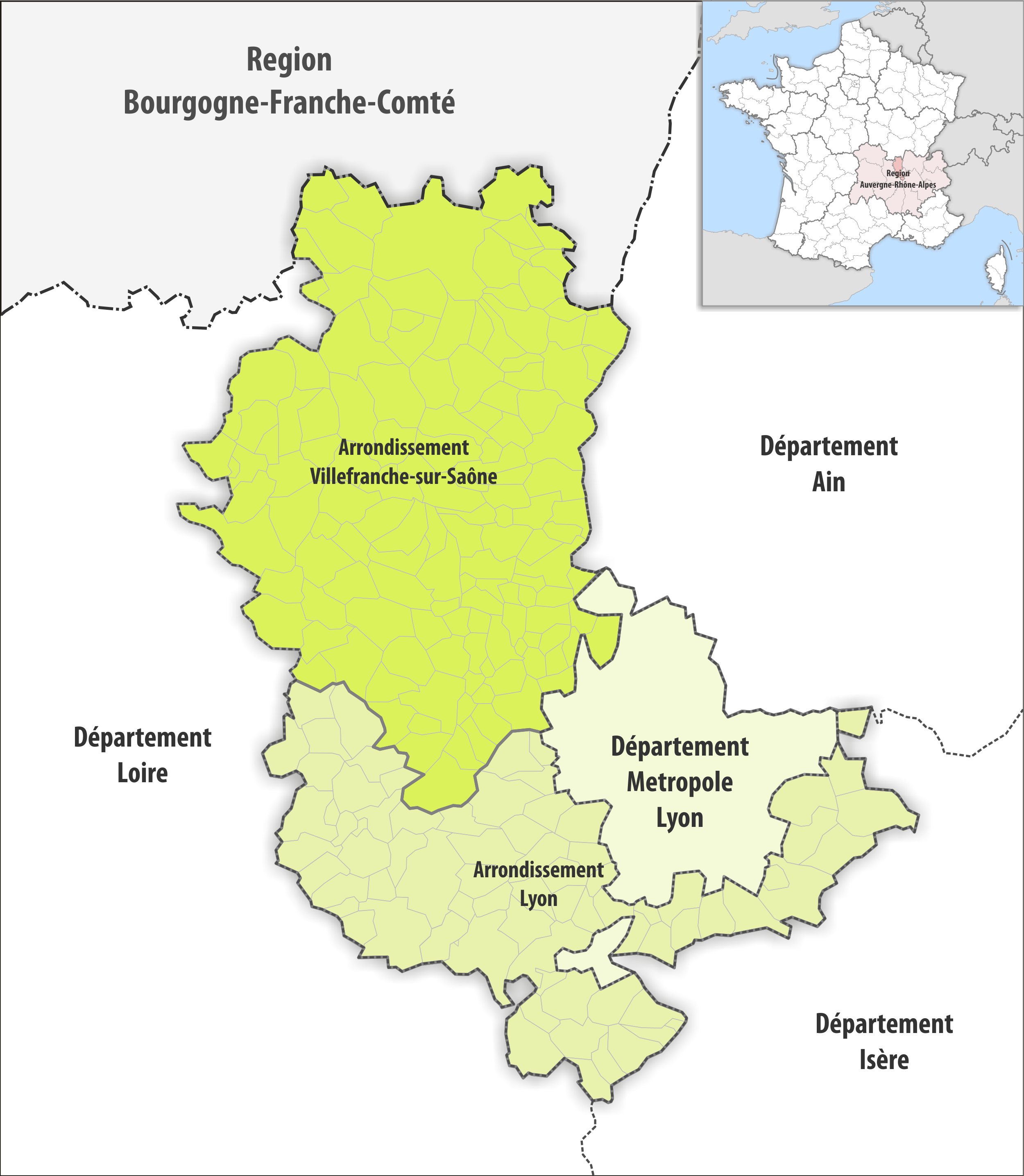
Map of arrondissements of the Rhône department.

The two arrondissements of the Rhône department are:

1. Arrondissement of Lyon, (prefecture of the Rhône department: Lyon) with 134 communes (58 of these communes are in the Metropolis of Lyon). The population of the arrondissement was 1,637,827 in 2021.
2. Arrondissement of Villefranche-sur-Saône, (subprefecture: Villefranche-sur-Saône) with 132 communes. The population of the arrondissement was 255,865 in 2021.

== History ==
In 1800, the arrondissements of Lyon and Villefranche were established. On 1 January 2015, 101 communes that did not join the newly created Metropolis of Lyon passed from the arrondissement of Lyon to the arrondissement of Villefranche-sur-Saône. On 1 February 2017, 78 communes passed from the arrondissement of Villefranche-sur-Saône to the arrondissement of Lyon.
