= Aqueduct of the Gier =

Ancient Roman aqueduct in present-day France

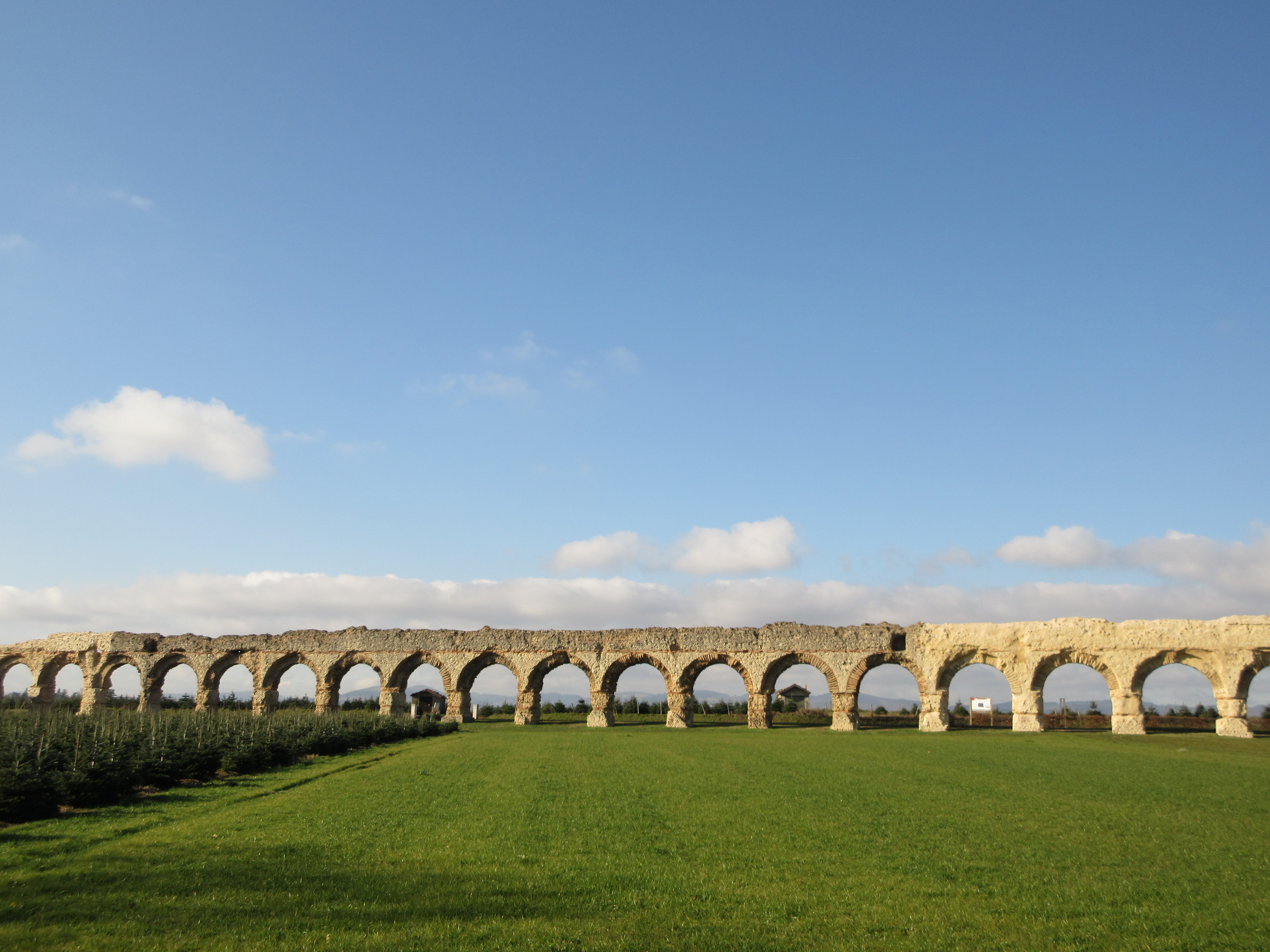
- Surviving arches of the Gier Aqueduct at Le Plat de l'Air, Chaponost

- Location within France
- 45°43′18″N 4°45′37″E
- Type: Roman aqueduct / Hydraulic engineering
- Periods: Classical antiquity, Roman
- Cultures: Roman, Gallo-Roman
- Satellite of: Roman Empire
- Location: From Saint-Chamond to Lyon (Lugdunum), France
- Region: Loire and Rhône
- Part of: Water supply system of Lugdunum

History
- Built: c. 1st–2nd century A.D. (likely early 2nd century A.D.)
- Abandoned: c. 4th–5th century A.D.

Site notes
- Material: Limestone, reticulated stonework, opus signinum
- Height: Up to 17 m (56 ft) on siphon/bridge sections
- Length: 86 km (53 mi)
- Excavation dates: Extensively mapped and studied from the 19th century onwards
- Archaeologists: Jean-Antoine Letronne, Amable Audin
- Condition: Partially ruined (substantial remains preserved, including 72 arches at Chaponost)
- Owner: State and municipal property
- Management: Syndicat Intercommunal de l'Aqueduc Romain du Gier (SIARG)
- Public access: Yes

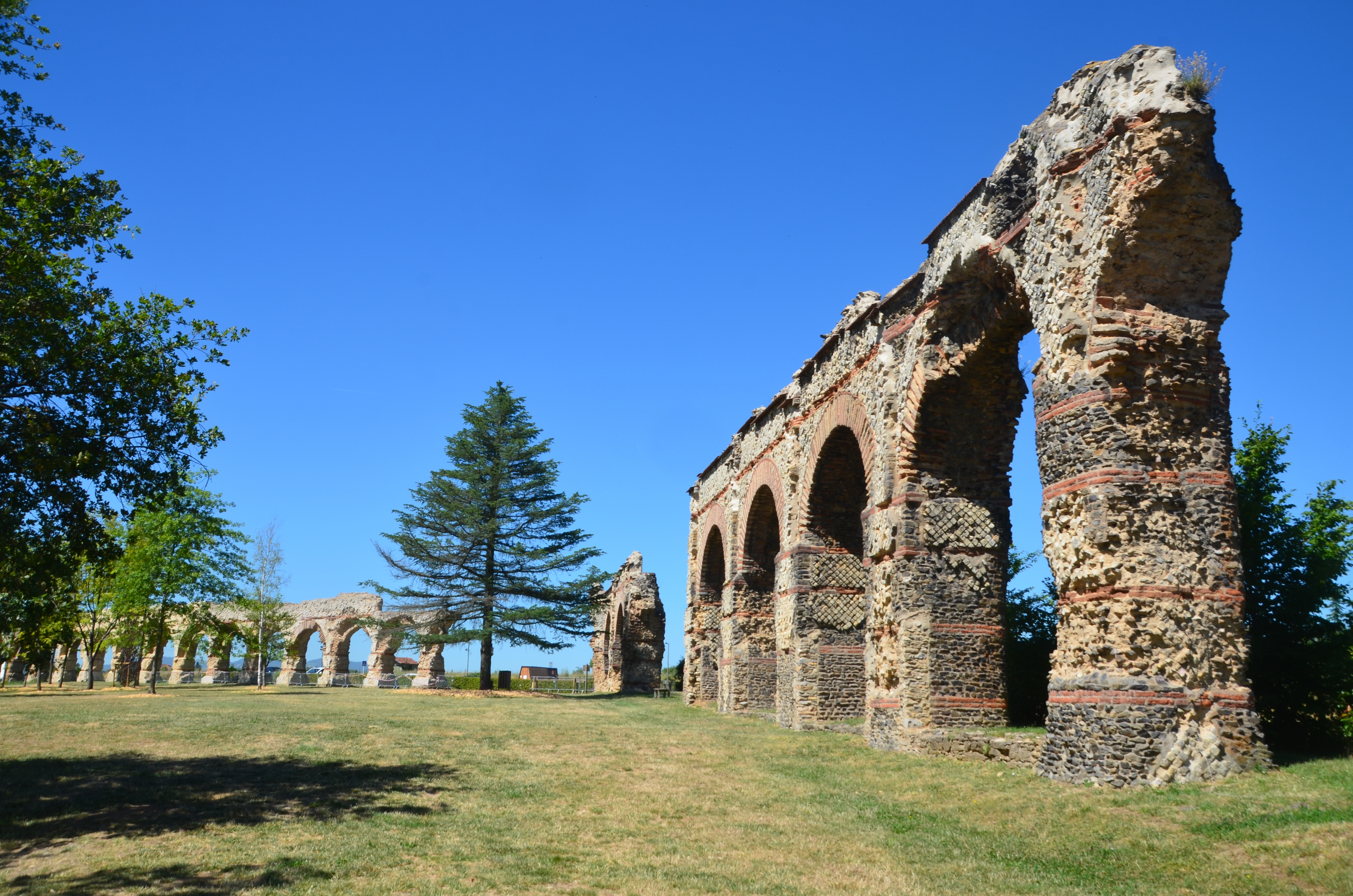
Vestiges of the Aqueduct of the Gier

The Aqueduct of the Gier (French Aqueduc du Gier) is an ancient Roman aqueduct probably constructed in the 1st century AD to provide water for Lugdunum (Lyon), in what is now eastern France. It is the longest and best preserved of four Roman aqueducts that served the growing capital of the Roman province of Gallia Lugdunensis. It drew its water from the source of the Gier, a small tributary of the Rhone, on the slopes of Mont Pilat, 42 km (26 mi) south-west of Lyon.

Following a sinuous path, at 85 km (53 mi) the aqueduct of the Gier is the longest known of the Roman aqueducts. Its route has been retraced in detail, following the numerous remains. Leaving the uplands of the Massif du Pilat, department of the Loire, the aqueduct hugs the surface relief and crosses the department of the Rhone, passing through Mornant, Orliénas, Chaponost and Sainte-Foy-lès-Lyon to terminate at Lyon.

In its extent, it draws upon the whole repertory of Roman techniques of aqueduct building, taking a slope that averages 0.1%, or a meter every kilometer. There are 73 km (45 mi) of covered ditches laid with a concrete culvert 3 m (9.8 ft) high and 1.5 m (4.9 ft) wide, which is sunk as deep as 4 m (13 ft) beneath the land surface. The aqueduct passes through 11 tunnels, one of which, near Mornant, is 825 m (2,707 ft) in extent. Access for cleaning and repairs was through manholes at 77 m (253 ft) distances. There are some thirty stretches in the open air. There are ten stretches raised on walls and arches, which provide the most spectacular visible remains of the aqueduct (illustrations).

Four inverted siphon tunnels cross the particularly deep and wide river valleys of the Durèze, the Garon, the Yzeron and the Trion on pipe bridges raised on high arches. In these, water filled a sunken tank tower (castellum) on the brim of a slope. The tank effected a transition between open channel flow and a lead pipeline. From the castellum water was carried, now pressurized, in a set of airtight lead pipes laid side by side, with soldered joints, down the valley slope, across a bridge spanning the river—whose piers and arches are the most notable remains of the system—and up the facing slope, to a tank slightly lower than the head tank, losing just a little hydraulic head in the process. The inverted siphons obviated the bridging of deep valleys with arcade upon arcade of arches, as at Pont du Gard, which marks the limit of such a system.

== Date ==
The Gier aqueduct was built in a single great campaign, since no part of it could have served until it was completed; it must have taken years. The aqueduct of Giers was dated by Germain de Montauzon to the reign of Hadrian in the early 2nd century AD, but, as James Stephen Bromwich points out, its reticulated stonework (opus reticulatum) was characteristic of the later 1st century BC and the first half of the 1st century AD, rather than of later masonry. In addition he notes that a recently excavated public fountain on the hill of Fourvières, datable about 50 AD could not have been supplied with water until the Giers aqueduct was complete.

== Gallery ==
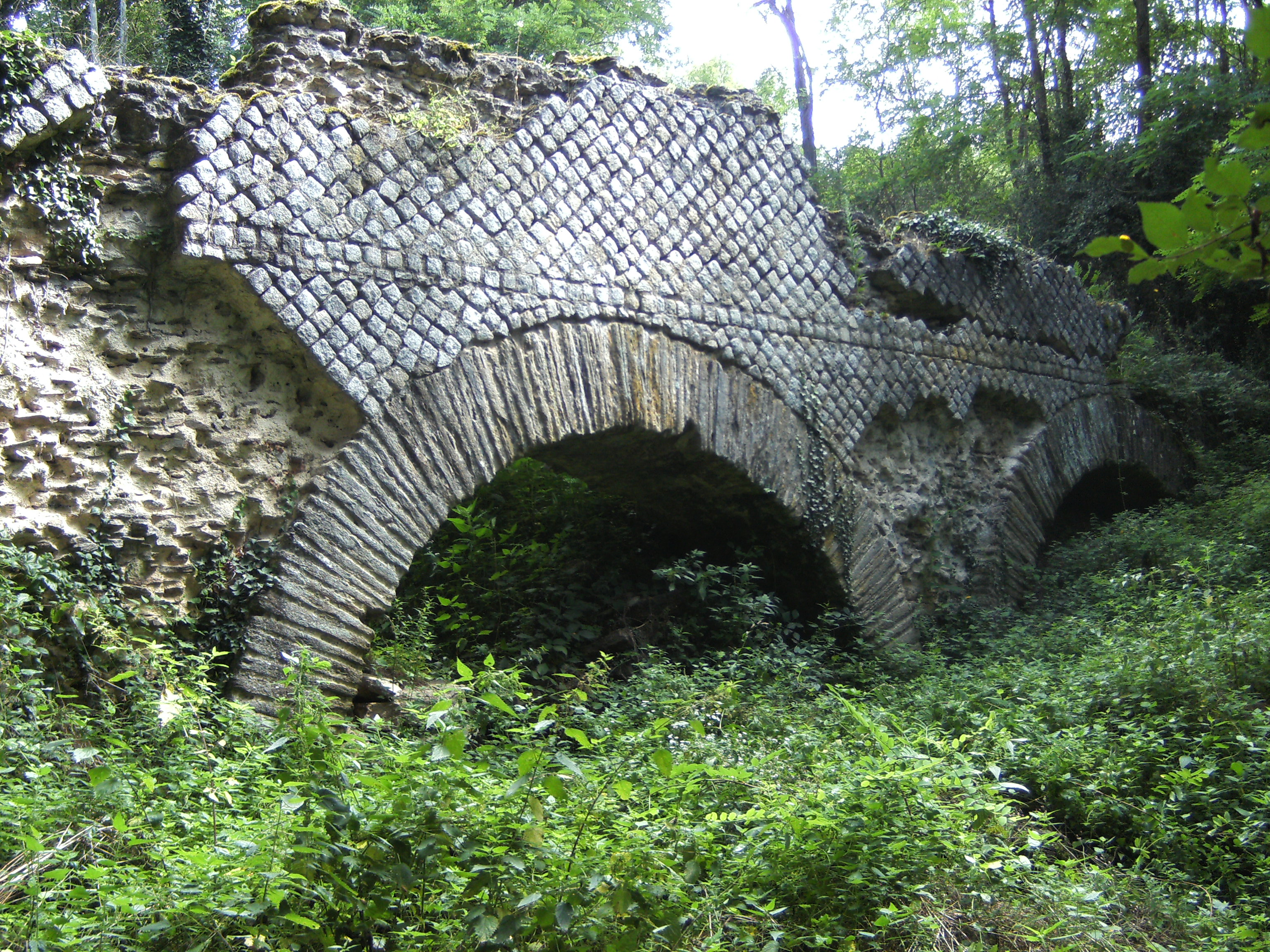
Arch of the aqueduct at Saint Maurice sur Dargoire showing opus reticulatum

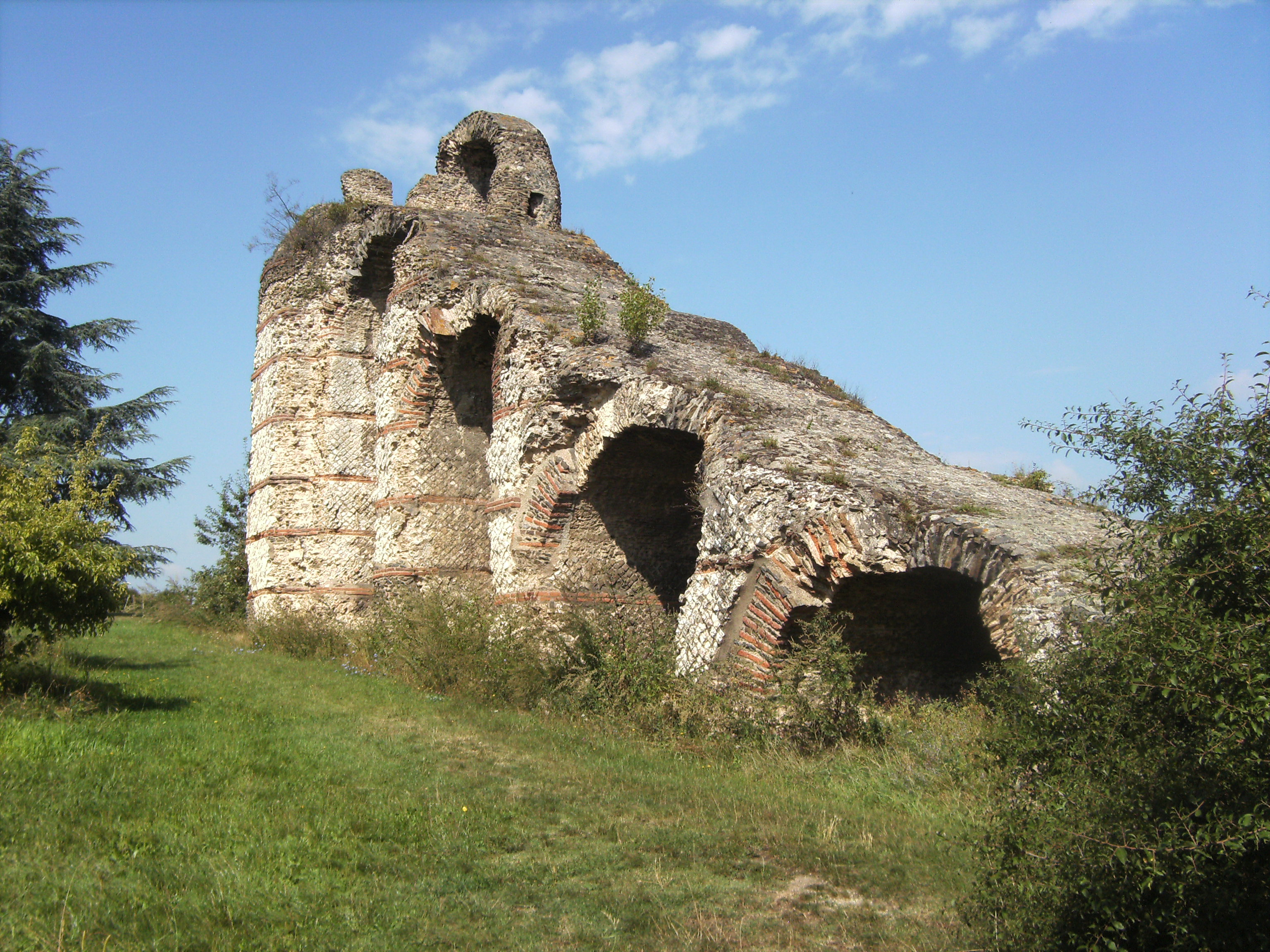
Chaponost, Plat de l'Air, headertank of the Yzeron inverted siphon

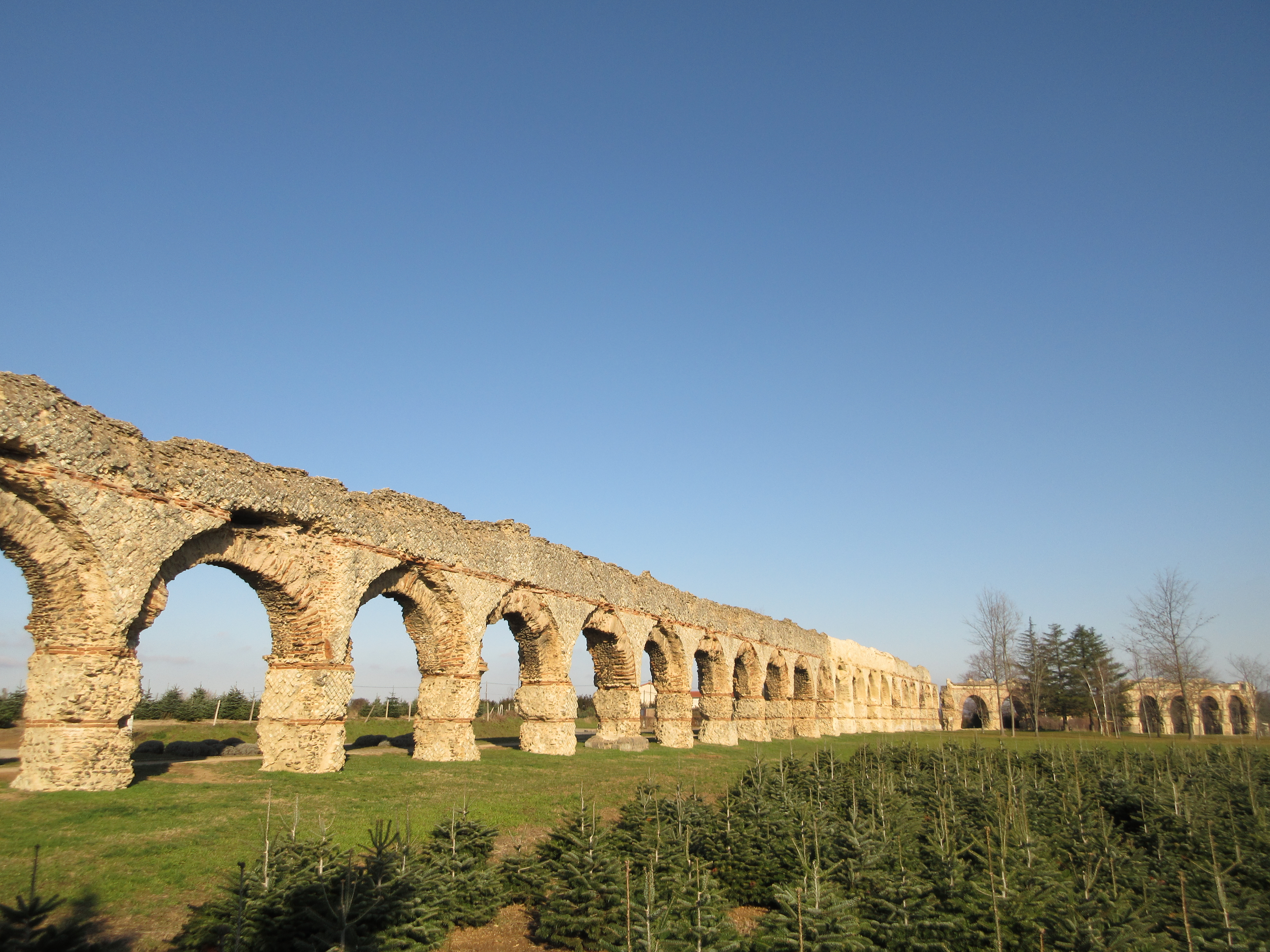
Vestiges of the Roman aqueduct in Chaponost

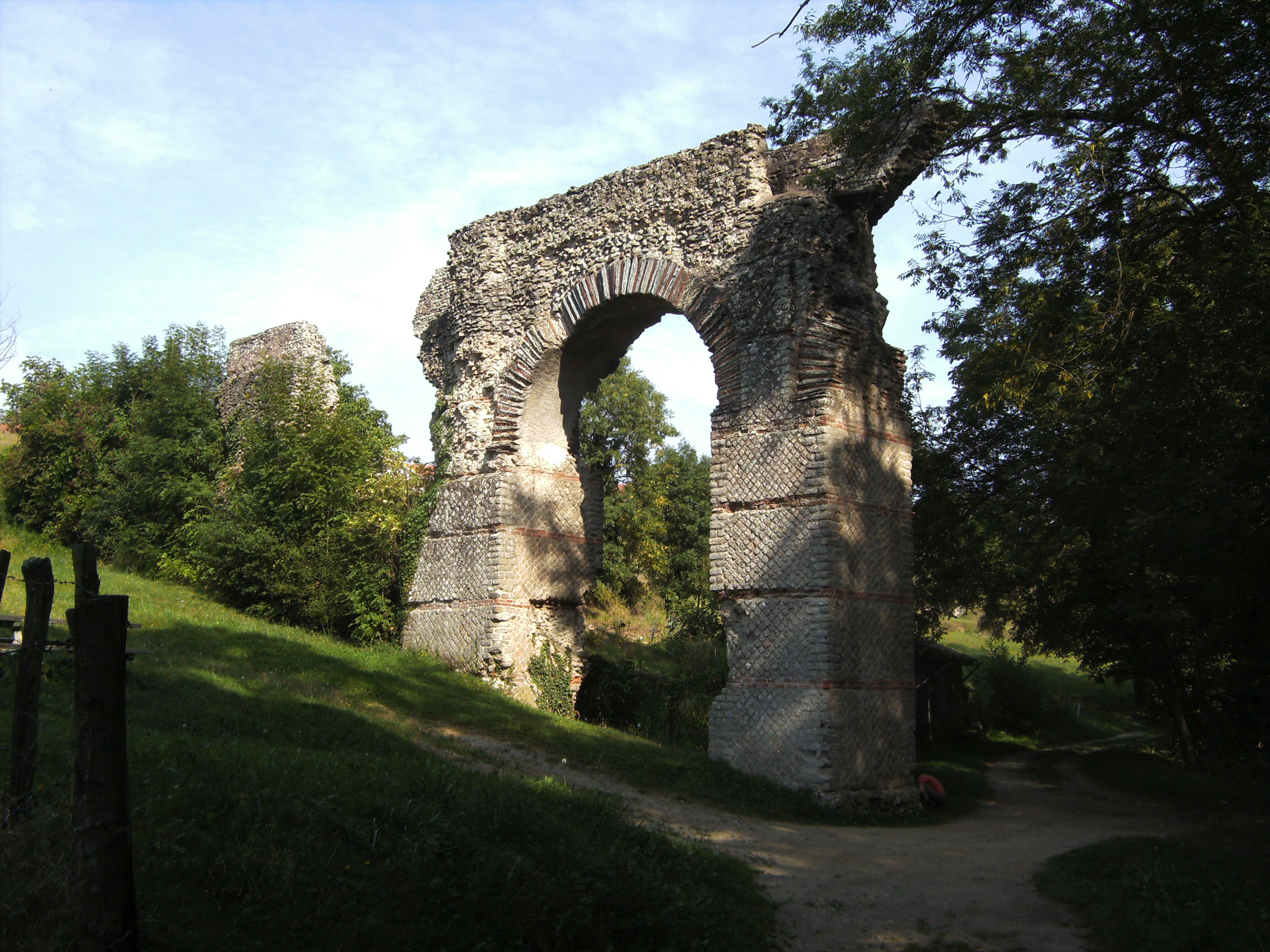
Aqueduct of Gier at Mornantet

== See also ==
- Fontenay aqueduct
