= Vourles =

- Commune
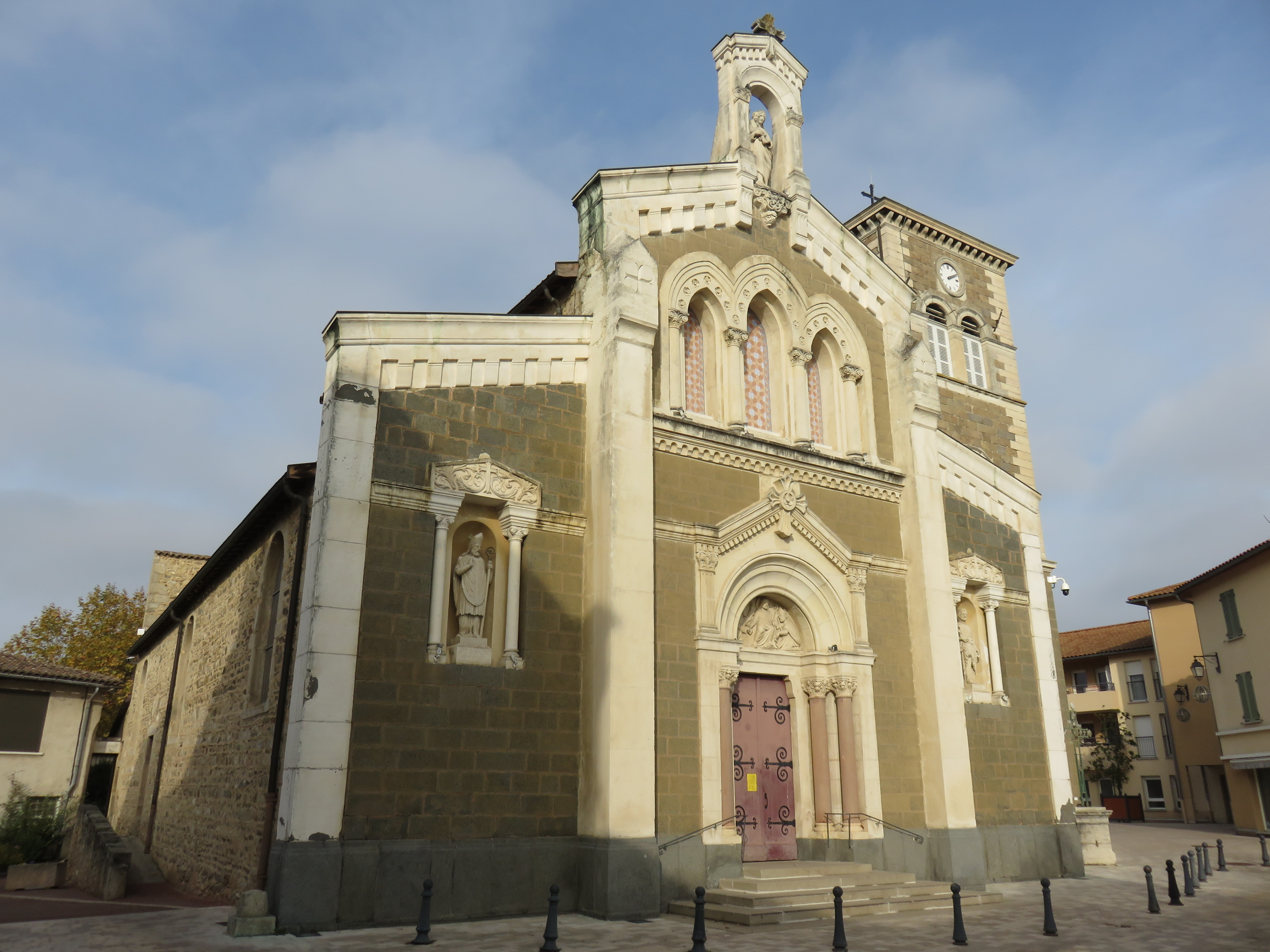
- Church of Vourles in 2017.

- Coat of arms
- Location of Vourles
- Location within France Location within Auvergne-Rhône-Alpes
- Coordinates: 45°39′34″N 4°46′27″E
- Country: France
- Region: Auvergne-Rhône-Alpes
- Department: Rhône
- Arrondissement: Lyon
- Canton: Brignais
- Intercommunality: Vallée du Garon

Government
  - Mayor (2020–2026): Catherine Staron
- Area^{1}: 5.6 km^{2} (2.2 sq mi)
- Elevation: 200 m (660 ft)
- Highest elevation: 286 m (938 ft)
- Lowest elevation: 184 m (604 ft)
- Population (2023): 3,332
  - Density: 600/km^{2} (1,500/sq mi)
- Time zone: UTC+01:00 (CET)
  - Summer (DST): UTC+02:00 (CEST)
- INSEE/Postal code: 69268 /69390
- ^{1} French Land Register data, which excludes lakes, ponds, glaciers > 1 km^{2} (0.386 sq mi or 247 acres) and river estuaries.

Vourles (French pronunciation: [vuʁl]) is a commune in the Rhône department in eastern France.

== Population ==
Historical population
Year	Pop.	±% p.a.
1968	1,171	—
1975	1,505	+3.65%
1982	1,514	+0.09%
1990	1,844	+2.50%
1999	2,743	+4.51%
2007	3,045	+1.31%
2012	3,129	+0.55%
2017	3,411	+1.74%
2023	3,332	−0.39%
Source: INSEE

== See also ==
- Communes of the Rhône department
