= Thomas Gassilloud =

French politician (born 1981)

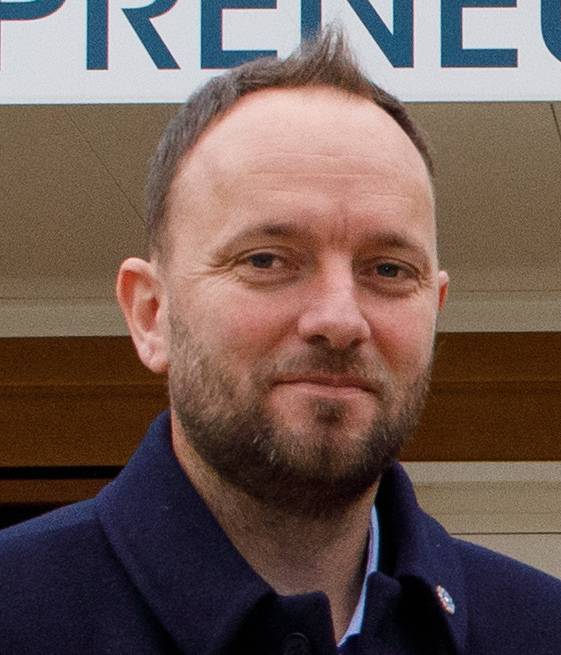
- Gassilloud in 2023

Member of the National Assembly for Rhône's 10th constituency
- Incumbent
- Assumed office 21 June 2017
- Preceded by: Christophe Guilloteau

Mayor of Saint-Symphorien-sur-Coise
- In office 30 March 2014 – 17 July 2017
- Preceded by: Roger Peillon
- Succeeded by: Jérôme Banino

Personal details
- Born: 21 May 1981 (age 45) Saint-Symphorien-sur-Coise, France
- Party: Renaissance (2017–2020; 2020–present)
- Other political affiliations: Miscellaneous right (until 2017); Agir (2020–2022)
- Education: Lumière University Lyon 2; Emlyon Business School

Thomas Gassilloud (French pronunciation: [tɔma ɡasiju]; born 21 May 1981) is a French politician who has represented the 10th constituency of the Rhône department in the National Assembly since 2017. First elected to Parliament as a member of La République En Marche! (LREM), he joined Agir in 2020 and sat with the Agir ensemble group in the National Assembly until 2022, when the group was disbanded. Following the 2022 legislative election, he joined the Renaissance group, after Agir was merged into Renaissance (formerly LREM).

== Early life and education ==
A native of Saint-Symphorien-sur-Coise, Gassilloud studied at Lumière University Lyon 2 and Emlyon Business School.

== Political career ==
In Parliament, Gassilloud serves on the Committee on National Defence and the Armed Forces, which he presided over from 30 June 2022 to 9 June 2024 in the 16th National Assembly. He succeeded Françoise Dumas who lost her seat in the 2022 legislative election. He also served in the Parliamentary Office for the Evaluation of Scientific and Technological Choices (OPECST) from 2017 to 2022.

In addition to his committee assignments, Gassilloud is part of a number of parliamentary friendship groups, including with the Central African Republic, Chad and Mali. He served in the Assemblée parlementaire de la Francophonie (APF) from 2017 to 2022, before he was part of the French delegation to the NATO Parliamentary Assembly from 2022 to 2024, where he served on the Political Committee, the Subcommittee on NATO Partnerships, as well as the Subcommittee on Transatlantic Relations.

== See also ==
- 2017 French legislative election
