= Departmental Council of Rhône =

Departmental legislature in France

Departmental Council of Rhône Conseil départemental du Rhône
- Logo of the Council

Leadership
- President: Christophe Guilloteau, LR since 2 April 2015

The Departmental Council of Rhône (French: Conseil départemental du Rhône) is the deliberative assembly of the French department of Rhône. Composed of 26 councilors, it is headquartered in Lyon.

== Executive ==
=== President ===
On April 2, 2015, the departmental councilor of the canton of Brignais, Christophe Guilloteau, was elected president of the departmental council, winning against Danielle Chuzeville, who chaired the Rhône General Council since January 21, 2013. He was re-elected as the president on July 1, 2021.

=== Vice-presidents ===
List of vice-presidents of the Ain Departmental Council (as of 2021)
Order	Name	Party	Canton (constituency)	Delegation
1st	Colette Darphin	UDI	Thizy-les-Bourgs	Territorial strategy, agriculture, rurality and sustainable development
2nd	Bruno Peylachon	LR	Tarare	Regional planning, housing, habitat, partnership with communities and economic cast
3rd	Martine Publié	LR	Val-d'Oingt	Culture, tourism, attractiveness and community life
4th	Daniel Valéro	LR	Genas	Colleges and digital transformation
5th	Mireille Simian	DVD	Saint-Symphorien-d'Ozon	Children, families and gender equality
6th	Thomas Ravier	LR	Villefranche-sur-Saône	Solidarity, autonomy and health
7th	Sylvie Epinat	LR	Gleizé	Finance, business and European funds
