= Yanick Paternotte =

French politician

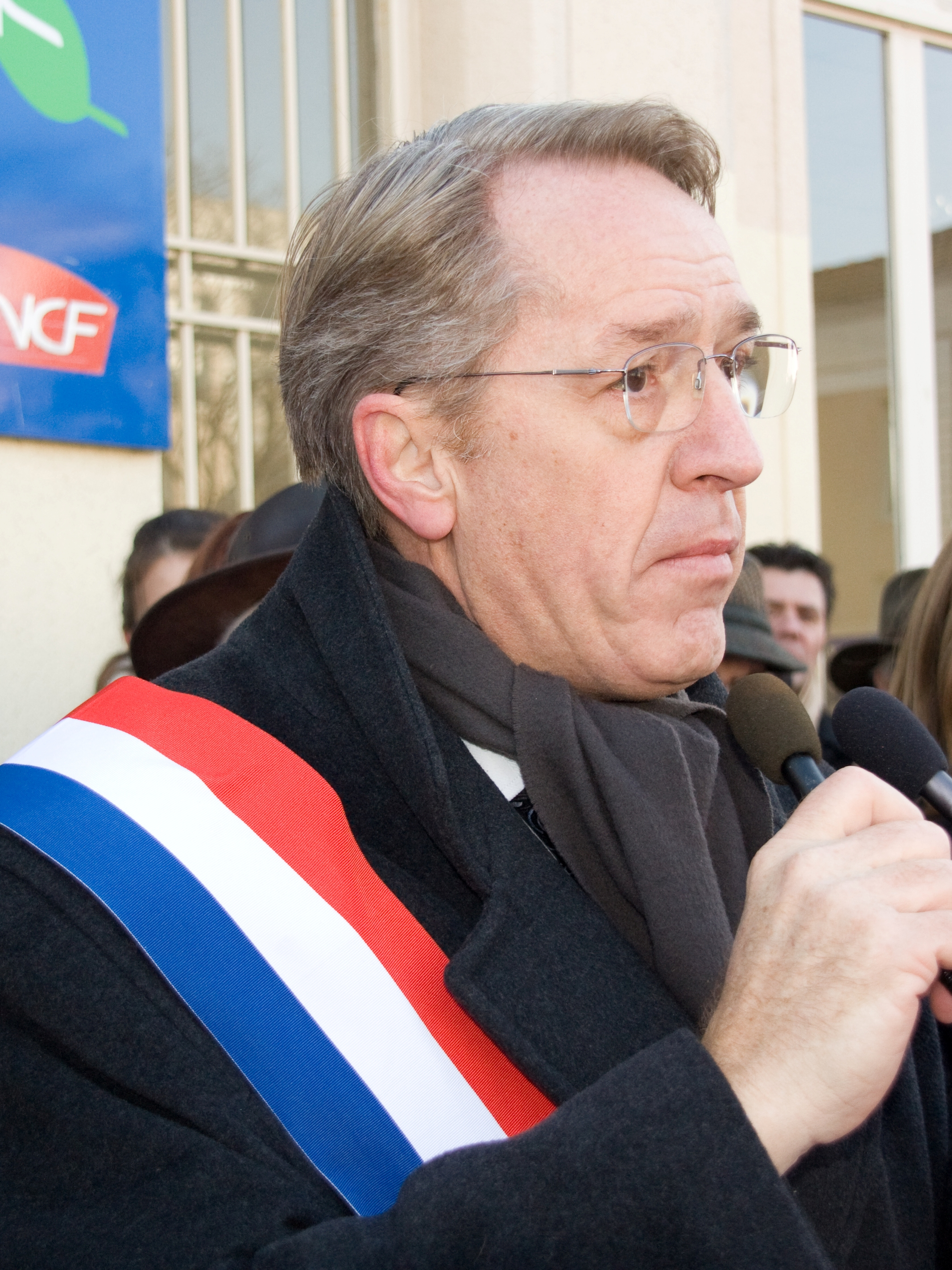
Yanick Paternotte

Yanick Paternotte (born 24 December 1951 in Nancy, France) was a member of the National Assembly of France, representing the Val-d'Oise department, from 2007 to 2012, as a member of the Union for a Popular Movement.

He was the mayor of Sannois from 1983 to 2014.
