= Jean Besson =

French politician, social-democrat (born 1948)

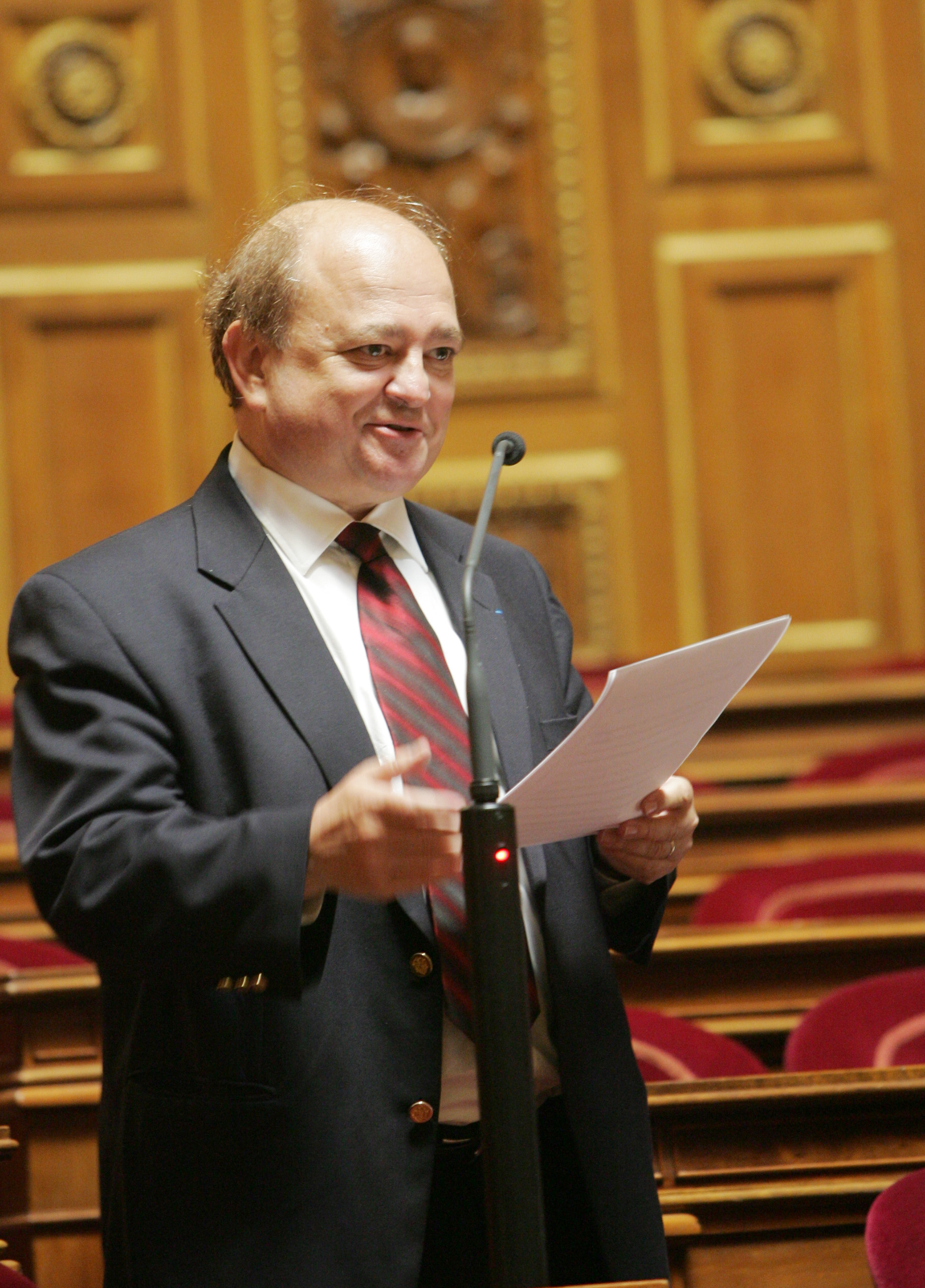
Jean Besson (2007).

Jean Besson (born 1 July 1948 in Valréas, Vaucluse) is a French politician, social-democrat. He is married and father of three children. He was a French Senator from 1989 to 2014.

== Biography ==
Jean BESSON, Honorary Senator, Honorary Member of the French Parliament, is currently the Chairman of “Energie SDED”, a public company dealing with energy distribution in the Drome County. He started his political career in 1977 as a Deputy Mayor of Valence (Drome). He was a “conseiller général” at the Drome General Council from 1979 to 2004. Jean Besson was French Senator for the Drome County during 25 years, elected for three consecutive terms in 1989, 1998 and 2008. Within the French Parliament, he was the President of the Friendship Group France-China for 16 years. From 2004 to 2010, as the Vice-President of the Rhone-Alps Regional Council in charge of European Affairs and International Relations, he reinforced the existing networks (e.g. “Four Motors for Europe” including Rhone-Alps, Catalonia, Lombardy, Baden-Württemberg) and interregional co-operations, notably with Poland (Malopolska), Quebec and China (Shanghai). He also established new partnerships with the United States of America (the State of Pennsylvania), Brazil (the State of Parana), India (the State of Karnataka) and Argentina (the Provinces of Buenos Aires and Mendoza). Jean Besson was administrator of the national company "Gaz de France" (GDF) from 1999 to 2004, administrator of "Institut français" from 2011 to 2014, administrator of "Entreprise Rhône-Alpes International" (ERAI) from 2006 to 2015, President of "Rhône-Alpes Tourisme" from 2011 to 2016. In 1987, he was named Knight of the National Order of Merit and in 2015, he was named Knight of the "Légion d'Honneur". He is specialized in tourism, energy and international relations. Jean BESSON lives in Valence (Drome).
