= Canton of Brignais =

Coordinates: 45.69°N 4.75°E

Brignais
- Canton
- Country: France
- Region: Auvergne-Rhône-Alpes
- Department: Rhône
- No. of communes: {{{nbcomm}}}
- Area: 62.1 km^{2} (24.0 sq mi)
- Population (2023): 42,010
  - Density: 676/km^{2} (1,750/sq mi)
- INSEE code: 6905

The Canton of Brignais is a French administrative division, located in the Rhône department.

The canton was established by decree of 27 February 2014 which came into force in March 2015.

== Composition ==
The canton of Brignais is composed of 6 communes:

Communes	Population (2012)
Brignais	11,390
Brindas	5,651
Chaponost	7,963
Grézieu-la-Varenne	5,227
Messimy	3,356
Vourles	3,129

== See also ==
- Cantons of the Rhône department
- Communes of the Rhône department
