= Pilat =

Pilat is a common surname in Central Europe. It is spelled simply Pilat in Western countries such as France and Austria, Pilát in Czech and Slovak, Piłat in Polish, and Pylat (Пилат) in Ukrainian. This may refer to individuals bearing the last name or the name itself.

The Ukrainian patronymic surname Pylatiuk/Pylatyuk is derived from the name.

== Origin ==
- German: from the Saxon word for 'strong sword', or bilihart. (Bihel = sword or ax.)
- French: habitational name from Pilat in Gironde, The Great Dune of Pyla in Gironde on the Atlantic coast, and Mont Pilat in Loire. The name is believed to be derived by one of two tribes of Celtic peoples - the Séguisaves and Allobroges in whose language Pi- = mount and -lat = broad.
- Italian: in ancient Rome, a pilum was a throwing spear carried by the legionnaires. Another theory of Pontius Pilate's origin is that he belonged to the Equestrian class of people.
- Slavic (Czech, Slovak and Polish): an individual acting/portraying the character of Pontius Pilate, particularly in a Passion play. A popular misconception is that, spelling differences aside, the historical figure of Pontius Pilate is somehow the progenitor of this last name. In actuality, he hailed from a Roman tribe properly called the Pontii?

== Persons with the surname Pilat ==
- Albert Pilát (1903–1974), a Czech botanist and mycologist
- Corrado Pilat is an Italian rugby union player.
- Ignaz Anton Pilat was the landscape architect for Frederick Law Olmsted to Central Park and an Austrian émigré.
- Stanisław Piłat head of the Institute of Technology of Petroleum and Natural Gases and patentholder at Lviv University, Ukraine who was killed by the Nazi secret police during World War II.
- Volodymyr Pylat, creator of Combat Hopak, Ukrainan martial arts

== See also ==
- Pylat (disambiguation)
