= Rhône (department) =

Department in Auvergne-Rhône-Alpes, France

Rhône Rôno (Arpitan)
- Department of France
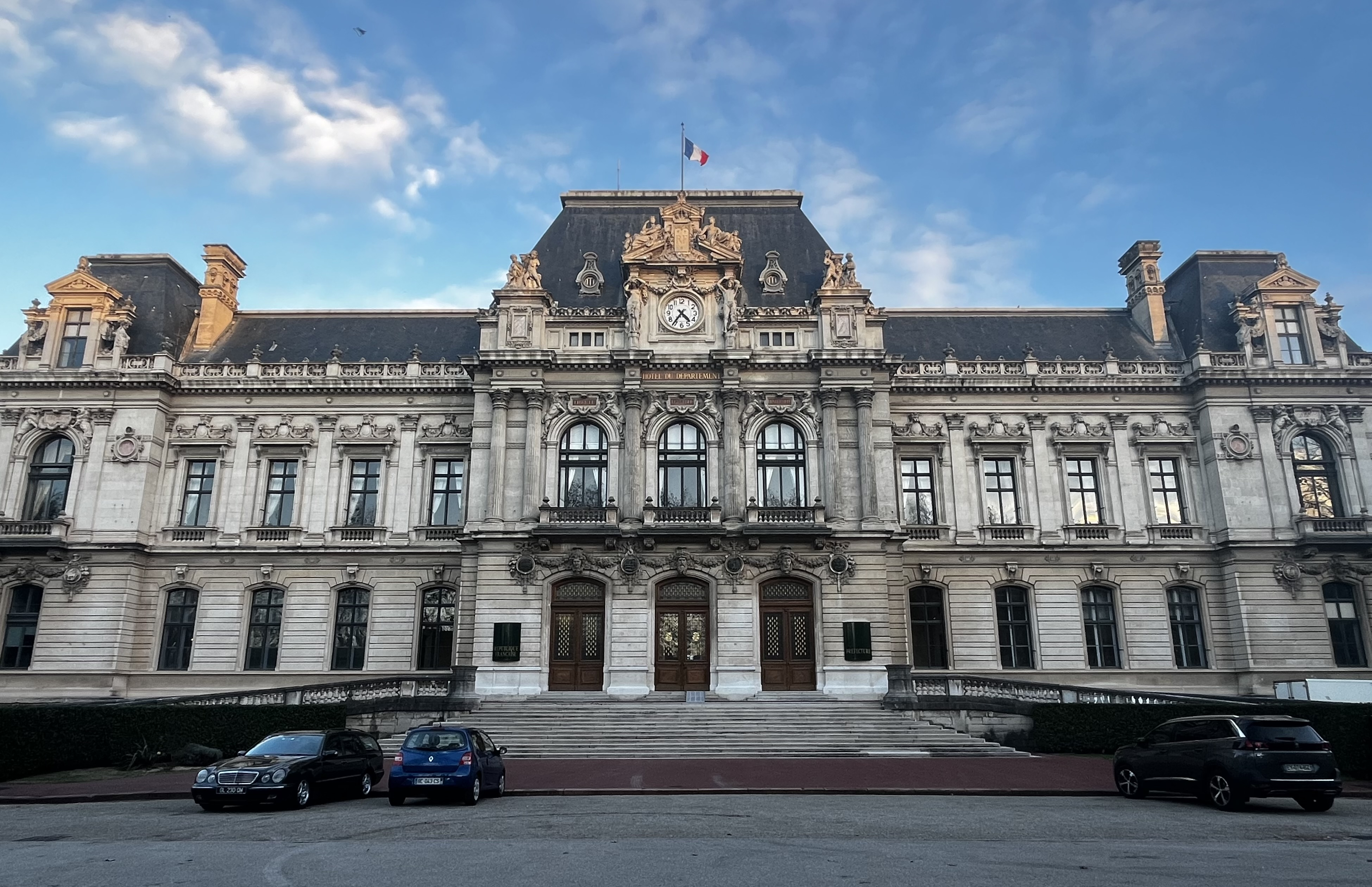
- The prefecture building of the Rhône department in the 3rd arrondissement of Lyon, which also houses the Departmental Council of Rhône.

- Flag Coat of arms

- Location of Rhône (excluding the Lyon Metropolis) in France
- Coordinates: 45°50′N 04°40′E
- Country: France
- Region: Auvergne-Rhône-Alpes
- Prefecture: Lyon
- Subprefectures: Villefranche-sur-Saône

Government
  - President of the Departmental Council: Christophe Guilloteau (LR)

Area^{1}
  - Total: 2,715 km^{2} (1,048 sq mi)

Population (2022)
  - Total: 474,369
  - Rank: 55th
  - Density: 174.7/km^{2} (452.5/sq mi)
- Time zone: UTC+1 (CET)
  - Summer (DST): UTC+2 (CEST)
- Department number: 69D
- Arrondissements: 2
- Cantons: 13
- Communes: 208
- ^1 French Land Register data, which excludes estuaries and lakes, ponds and glaciers larger than 1 km².

Rhône (French: [ʁon]; Arpitan: Rôno) is a French department located in the east-central administrative region of Auvergne-Rhône-Alpes. Named after the river Rhône, its prefecture is Lyon. Its sole subprefecture is Villefranche-sur-Saône. Including the Metropolis of Lyon, it had a population of 1,914,667 in 2023; excluding the Metropolis of Lyon, it had 478,313 inhabitants.

== History ==
The department was created on 12 August 1793, when the former Rhône-et-Loire was split into two departments: Rhône and Loire.

Originally, the eastern border of Rhône was the City of Lyon itself, so that the communes immediately east of Lyon belonged to neighbouring departments. With the growth of Lyon and the extension of its urban area into communes such as Villeurbanne, Vénissieux and Saint-Priest, the limits of the department were judged impractical as they left the suburbs of Lyon outside of Rhône. Thus, Rhône was enlarged several times to incorporate into it the suburbs of Lyon from neighbouring department:

- In 1852, four communes from Isère were incorporated into Rhône.
- In 1967, 23 communes of Isère and six communes of Ain were incorporated into Rhône.
- In 1971, one commune from Isère was incorporated into Rhône.

With these enlargements, the area of the department increased from 2,791 km^{2} to 3,249 km^{2} (16.4% larger). At the 1999 census, the original department of Rhône would have had only 1,071,288 inhabitants, which means that the population in the territories added in the last two centuries was 507,581 inhabitants in 1999.

In 2015 the Metropolis of Lyon was administratively separated from the department of Rhône, with the competencies of an intercommunality and department. It functions with its own council which does not rely on cantons. The separation made Rhône lose 16% of its territory and 75% of its population. Lyon, although no longer part of the department, remains its administrative centre, since its prefect sits there. This makes Rhône the sole department with a prefecture that is outside its territory. The departmental council also did not move to Villefranche-sur-Saône, meaning that it sits outside the territory on which it has jurisdiction. The department and metropolis share a prefect.

== Geography ==
Rivers include the Rhône and the Saône (which joins the Rhône in Lyon). The neighboring departments are Ain, Isère, Loire and Saône-et-Loire.

== Demographics ==
Population development since 1801 (including the Lyon Metropolis):

Historical population

Year	Pop.	±% p.a.
1801	299,390	—
1831	434,429	+1.25%
1841	500,831	+1.43%
1851	574,745	+1.39%
1861	662,493	+1.43%
1872	670,247	+0.11%
1881	741,470	+1.13%
1891	806,737	+0.85%
1901	843,179	+0.44%
1911	915,581	+0.83%
1921	956,566	+0.44%
1931	1,046,028	+0.90%
1936	1,028,379	−0.34%

Year	Pop.	±% p.a.
1946	918,866	−1.12%
1954	966,782	+0.64%
1962	1,116,664	+1.82%
1968	1,326,383	+2.91%
1975	1,429,647	+1.08%
1982	1,445,208	+0.15%
1990	1,508,966	+0.54%
1999	1,578,869	+0.50%
2007	1,677,073	+0.76%
2012	1,762,866	+1.00%
2017	1,843,319	+0.90%
2023	1,914,667	+0.63%

Before the Metropolis of Lyon was separated from the department, over 75% of its population lived within Greater Lyon, which included all of the largest cities of the Rhône department, apart from Villefranche-sur-Saône.

The most populous commune of the new department of Rhône is Villefranche-sur-Saône. As of 2023, there are 5 communes with more than 10,000 inhabitants:

Commune	Population (2023)
Villefranche-sur-Saône	36,172
Belleville-en-Beaujolais	14,016
Genas	13,421
Brignais	12,503
Tarare	10,893

== Politics ==
The President of the Departmental Council has been Christophe Guilloteau since 2015, a member of The Republicans (LR).

=== Representation in Paris ===
Rhône elects its representatives in Paris within the same electoral constituency as the Lyon Metropolis, the departmental constituency of Rhône (circonscription départementale du Rhône).

==== Members of the National Assembly ====
In the 2024 legislative election, Rhône elected the following members of the National Assembly:

Constituency	Member	Party
Rhône's 1st constituency	Anaïs Belouassa-Cherifi	LFI
Rhône's 2nd constituency	Boris Tavernier	LÉ–EELV
Rhône's 3rd constituency	Marie-Charlotte Garin	LÉ–EELV
Rhône's 4th constituency	Sandrine Runel	PS
Rhône's 5th constituency	Blandine Brocard	MoDem
Rhône's 6th constituency	Gabriel Amard	LFI
Rhône's 7th constituency	Alexandre Vincendet	LR
Rhône's 8th constituency	Jonathan Géry	RN
Rhône's 9th constituency	Alexandre Portier	LR
Rhône's 10th constituency	Thomas Gassilloud	RE
Rhône's 11th constituency	Jean-Luc Fugit	RE
Rhône's 12th constituency	Cyrille Isaac-Sibille	MoDem
Rhône's 13th constituency	Tiffany Joncour	RN
Rhône's 14th constituency	Idir Boumertit	LFI

This list includes representatives from the Lyon Metropolis created in 2015 as a separate collectivity.

== Tourism ==
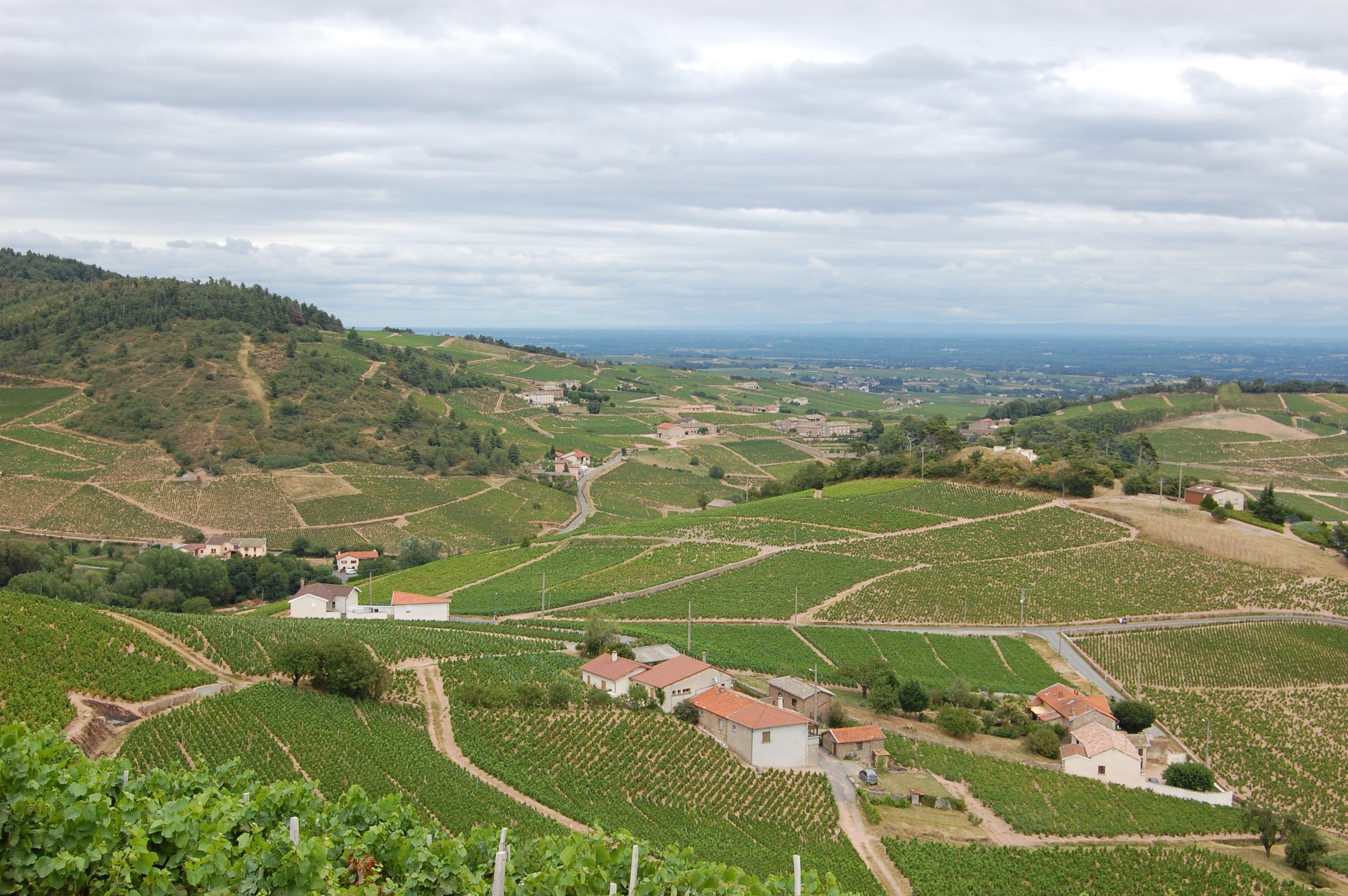
Beaujolais vineyards

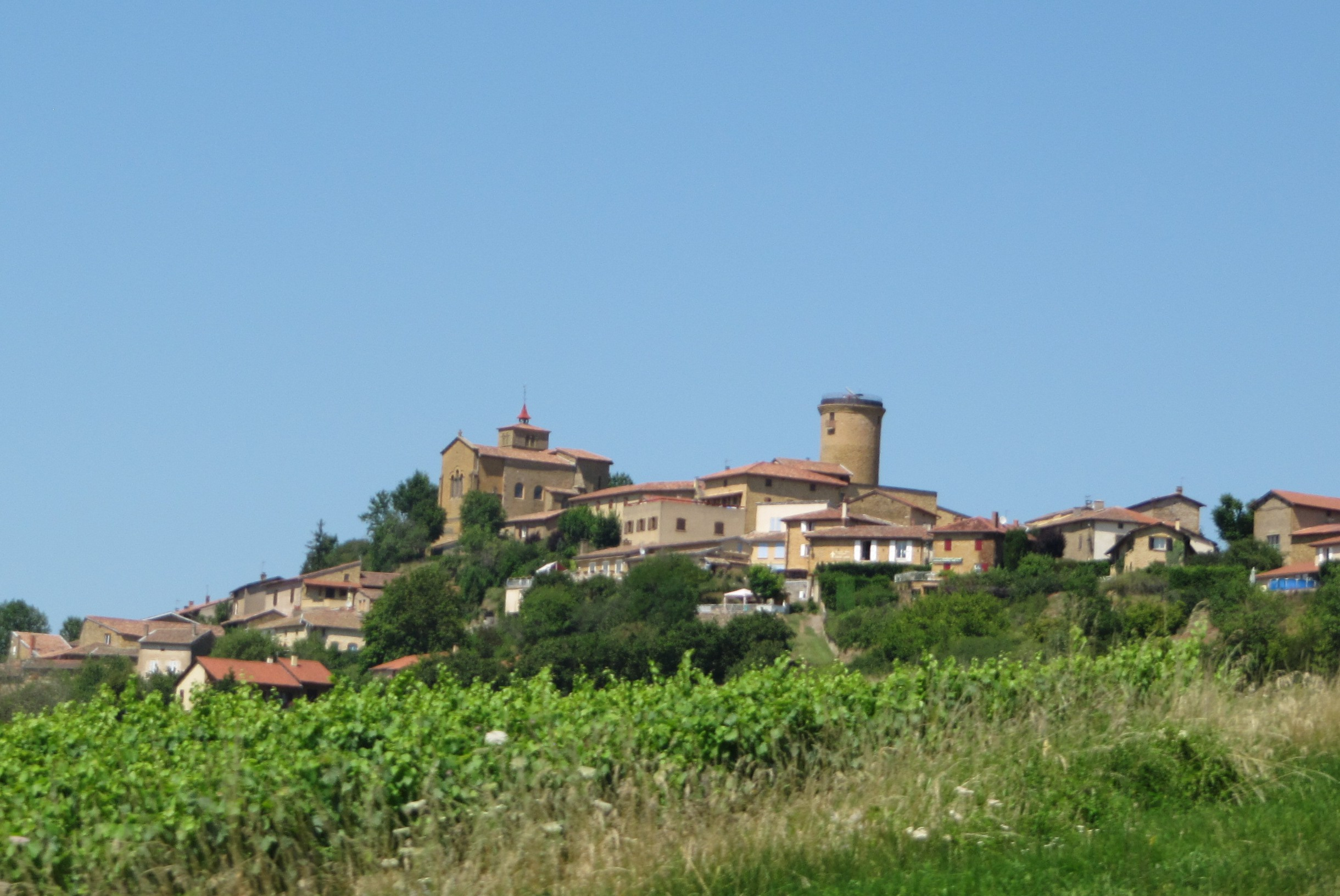
Oingt, one of The Most Beautiful Villages of France

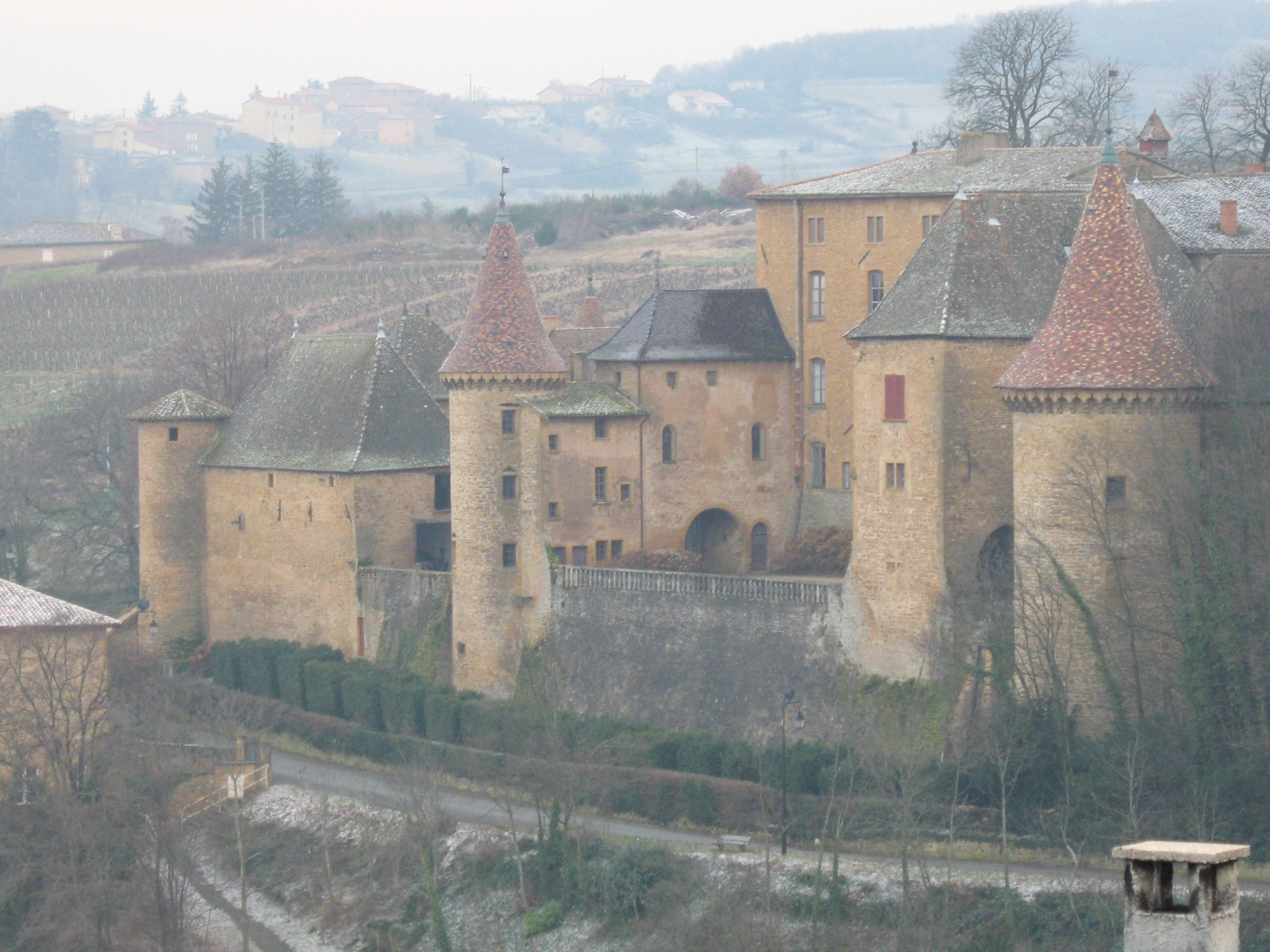
Château de Jarnioux

== See also ==
- Cantons of the Rhône department
- Communes of the Rhône department
- Arrondissements of the Rhône department
