= Results of the 2024 French legislative election in Oise =

Following the first round of the 2024 French legislative election on 30 June 2024, runoff elections in each constituency where no candidate received a vote share greater than 50 percent were scheduled for 7 July. Candidates permitted to stand in the runoff elections needed to either come in first or second place in the first round or achieve more than 12.5 percent of the votes of the entire electorate (as opposed to 12.5 percent of the vote share due to low turnout).

== Oise ==
=== 1st constituency ===
Candidate	Party or alliance		First round		Second round	
Candidate	Party or alliance		Votes	%	Votes	%
Claire Marais-Beuil	National Rally		24,621	46.19	26,824	51.69
Victor Habert-Dassault	The Republicans		13,049	24.48	25,070	48.31
Roxane Lundy	New Popular Front	Génération.s	9,402	17.64		
Matys Gutierrez	Ensemble	Renaissance	4,062	7.62		
Axel Latrasse	Ecologists	Independent	749	1.41		
Souhail Aouad	Miscellaneous centre	Independent	728	1.37		
Jean-Philippe Fruitier	Far-left	Lutte Ouvrière	348	0.65		
Norbert Depresles	Reconquête		339	0.64		
Total			53,298	100.00	51,894	100.00
Valid votes			53,298	97.86	51,894	96.27
Invalid votes			389	0.71	571	1.06
Blank votes			774	1.42	1,442	2.67
Total votes			54,461	100.00	53,907	100.00
Registered voters/turnout			83,258	65.41	83,251	64.75

=== 2nd constituency ===
Candidate	Party or alliance		Votes	%
Philippe Ballard	National Rally		30,823	53.20
Ludovic Castanié	The Republicans		12,339	21.30
Marianne Seck	New Popular Front	La France Insoumise	10,772	18.59
Mohamed El Aiyate	Ecologists		2,144	3.70
Pierre Delarboulas	Reconquête		1,225	2.11
Renée Potchtovik	Far-left	Lutte Ouvrière	630	1.09
Total			57,933	100.00
Valid votes			57,933	96.84
Invalid votes			503	0.84
Blank votes			1,388	2.32
Total votes			59,824	100.00
Registered voters/turnout			89,305	66.99

=== 3rd constituency ===
Candidate	Party or alliance		First round		Second round	
Candidate	Party or alliance		Votes	%	Votes	%
Alexandre Sabatou	National Rally		19,487	43.10	21,940	51.96
Amadou Ka	New Popular Front	La France Insoumise	14,149	31.29	20,281	48.04
Pascal Bois	Ensemble	Renaissance	8,556	18.92		
Marie Ferreira	Union of Democrats and Independents (Note: Dissident who ran without the backing of Ensemble)		1,931	4.27		
Nadège Legris	Far-right	Independent	573	1.27		
Roland Szpirko	Far-left	Lutte Ouvrière	522	1.15		
Total			45,218	100.00	42,221	100.00
Valid votes			45,218	97.34	42,221	90.89
Invalid votes			332	0.71	990	2.13
Blank votes			902	1.94	3,241	6.98
Total votes			46,452	100.00	46,452	100.00
Registered voters/turnout			74,495	62.36	74,512	62.34

=== 4th constituency ===
Candidate	Party or alliance		First round		Second round	
Candidate	Party or alliance		Votes	%	Votes	%
Mathieu Grimpret	National Rally		25,093	40.23	28,026	46.55
Eric Woerth	Ensemble	Renaissance	18,646	29.89	32,174	53.45
Mohamed Assamti	New Popular Front	La France Insoumise	10,644	17.06		
Jean Lefèvre	The Republicans		3,942	6.32		
Sophie Reynal	Miscellaneous centre	Independent	2,157	3.46		
Jean-Claude Casas	Reconquête		772	1.24		
Caroline Dasini	Far-left	Lutte Ouvrière	422	0.68		
Noël Ngabissio	Ecologists	Independent	422	0.68		
Augusto Fernandes	Sovereigntist right	Debout la France	280	0.45		
Total			62,378	100.00	60,200	100.00
Valid votes			62,378	97.90	60,200	95.33
Invalid votes			385	0.60	700	1.11
Blank votes			955	1.50	2,246	3.56
Total votes			63,718	100.00	63,146	100.00
Registered voters/turnout			94,183	67.65	94,206	67.03

=== 5th constituency ===
Candidate	Party or alliance		First round		Second round	
Candidate	Party or alliance		Votes	%	Votes	%
Frédéric Pierre Vos	National Rally		20,070	42.15	24,669	55.76
Bertrand Brassens	New Popular Front	Socialist Party	10,491	22.03	19,575	44.24
Pierre Vatin	The Republicans		8,427	17.70		
Etienne Diot	Ensemble	Renaissance	7,232	15.19		
Véronique Rogez	Sovereigntist right	Debout la France	509	1.07		
Hélène Becherini	Far-left	Lutte Ouvrière	503	1.06		
Jean-Paul Boucher	Reconquête		379	0.80		
Total			47,611	100.00	44,244	100.00
Valid votes			47,611	97.94	44,244	91.75
Invalid votes			299	0.62	854	1.77
Blank votes			704	1.45	3,124	6.48
Total votes			48,614	100.00	48,222	100.00
Registered voters/turnout			73,645	66.01	73,645	65.48

=== 6th constituency ===
Candidate	Party or alliance		First round		Second round	
Candidate	Party or alliance		Votes	%	Votes	%
Michel Guiniot	National Rally		23,402	47.88	25,058	52.44
Daniel Leca	Ensemble	Union of Democrats and Independents	11,207	22.93	22,725	47.56
Baptiste De Fresse de Monval	New Popular Front	The Ecologists	9,999	20.46		
Nathalie Charruau	Miscellaneous right	Miscellaneous centre	2,766	5.66		
Guy-Eric Imbert	Reconquête		857	1.75		
Jean-Marc Iskin	Far-left	Lutte Ouvrière	648	1.33		
Total			48,879	100.00	47,783	100.00
Valid votes			48,879	97.32	47,783	95.72
Invalid votes			352	0.70	492	0.99
Blank votes			996	1.98	1,645	3.30
Total votes			50,227	100.00	49,920	100.00
Registered voters/turnout			75,856	66.21	75,862	65.80

=== 7th constituency ===
Candidate	Party or alliance		First round		Second round	
Candidate	Party or alliance		Votes	%	Votes	%
David Magnier	National Rally		19,769	40.43	21,662	43.85
Loïc Pen	New Popular Front	French Communist Party	13,289	27.18	16,999	34.41
Maxime Minot	The Republicans		10,519	21.52	10,734	21.73
Ophélie Van Elsuwe	Ensemble	Horizons	4,006	8.19		
Agnès Dingival	Far-left	Lutte Ouvrière	615	1.26		
Florence Italiani	Reconquête		415	0.85		
Thomas Mongiraud	Sovereigntist right	Debout la France	278	0.57		
Total			48,891	100.00	49,395	100.00
Valid votes			48,891	97.87	49,395	97.84
Invalid votes			313	0.63	267	0.53
Blank votes			749	1.50	822	1.63
Total votes			49,953	100.00	50,484	100.00
Registered voters/turnout			77,118	64.77	77,132	65.45
