= Lucien Degauchy =

French politician (1937–2022)

Member of the National Assembly for Oise's 5th constituency
- In office 2 April 1993 – 20 June 2017
- Preceded by: Michel Françaix
- Succeeded by: Pierre Vatin

Personal details
- Born: 11 June 1937 Hautefontaine, France
- Died: 11 February 2022 (aged 84) Courtieux, France
- Party: UMP; The Republicans

Lucien Degauchy (11 June 1937 – 11 February 2022) was a member of the National Assembly of France from 1993 to 2017. He represented the Oise department, and was a member of the Union for a Popular Movement. Born in France, he died on 11 February 2022, at the age of 84.

== Biography ==
Mayor of Courtieux since 1977, he was elected representative for the 5th district of Oise on March 28, 1993 (10th legislature), re-elected on June 1, 1997, for the 11th legislature, then on June 16, 2002, for the 12th legislature. He was re-elected in the first round on June 10, 2007, for the 13th legislature, then on June 17, 2012, for the 14th legislature. He is recognized in the chamber for wearing his yellow jackets.

He is a member of the Republican Right group.

He supports Alain Juppé in the 2016 Republican presidential primary.

During the 2017 legislative elections, he did not run for re-election. However, he remained the alternate for his former parliamentary assistant, Pierre Vatin, who was elected deputy in June 2017.

Running for re-election in the 2020 municipal elections, he was re-elected in the first round with 91.7% of the vote.

He died on February 11, 2022, at the age of 84.
