= Olivier Dassault =

French politician (1951–2021)

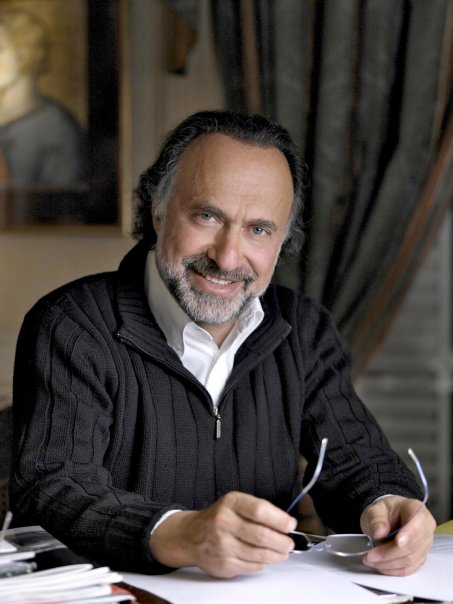
- Dassault in 2013

Member of the National Assembly for Oise's 1st constituency
- In office 21 June 2002 – 7 March 2021
- Preceded by: Yves Rome
- Succeeded by: Victor Habert-Dassault
- In office 1988–1997
- Succeeded by: Yves Rome

Personal details
- Born: 1 June 1951 Boulogne-Billancourt, France
- Died: 7 March 2021 (aged 69) Touques, Calvados, France
- Cause of death: Helicopter crash
- Party: The Republicans
- Spouses: Carole Tranchant (m. 1989, divorced); Natacha Nikolajevic (m. 2009)
- Relations: Laurent Dassault (brother); Victor Habert-Dassault (nephew)
- Children: 3
- Parent(s): Serge Dassault (father); Nicole Raffel (mother)
- Education: École de l'air

Military service
- Allegiance: France
- Branch/service: French Air and Space Force
- Years of service: 1970s

Olivier Dassault (French pronunciation: [ɔlivje daso]; 1 June 1951 – 7 March 2021) was a French politician and billionaire businessman, who served as a deputy in the National Assembly.

== Early life and education ==
Born in Boulogne-Billancourt, he was the son of businessman and politician Serge Dassault and his wife Nicole (née Raffel), and the grandson of industrialist Marcel Dassault. Dassault graduated from École de l'air as a combat engineering officer and pilot in 1974. He was then a reserve member of the French Air Force.

== Career ==
In June 2002, he was elected as deputy for the first circonscription of Oise, running on the Union for a Popular Movement (UMP) ticket, the first to hold this office following the shift from Proportional Representation. He was re-elected in 2007.

A scion of the founding family of the aerospace engineering company Dassault Group, he worked in a number of roles within the family firm. He was president of Dassault Communications, president of the board of directors of French publisher Valmonde (a former family property), member of the board of the French financial newspaper Journal des Finances and an administrator of Dassault subsidiary Socpresse.

In April 2020, his net worth was estimated to be US$4.7 billion.

He was a 1974 graduate of the Air Force Academy (École de l'air) and held a master's degree in mathematics (1976) as well a doctorate in business management computing (1980). During his lifetime, he cultivated a passion for photography and published several books of his photographs. Dassault was also a composer and musician, and contributed scores for several movies in the late 1970s and early 1980s.

=== Speed records ===
Having qualified as a professional IFR pilot in 1975, he set a number of world speed records:

1977: New York to Paris in a Dassault Falcon 50
1987: New Orleans to Paris in a Dassault Falcon 900 (both jointly with Hervé Le Prince-Ringuet)
1996: Paris to Abu Dhabi in a Falcon 900 EX
1996: Paris to Singapore in a Falcon 900 EX (both jointly with Guy Mitaux-Maurouard and Patrick Experton)

== Honours and awards ==
- Knight of the Order of Legion of Honour
- Officer of the Ordre National du Mérite
- Officer of the Ordre des Arts et des Lettres

== Death ==
Dassault died on 7 March 2021 when the Eurocopter AS350 Écureuil helicopter he was in crashed in Touques in northwestern France. He was 69 years old. The pilot, the only other person on board, was also killed.
