= Agnès Thill =

French politician

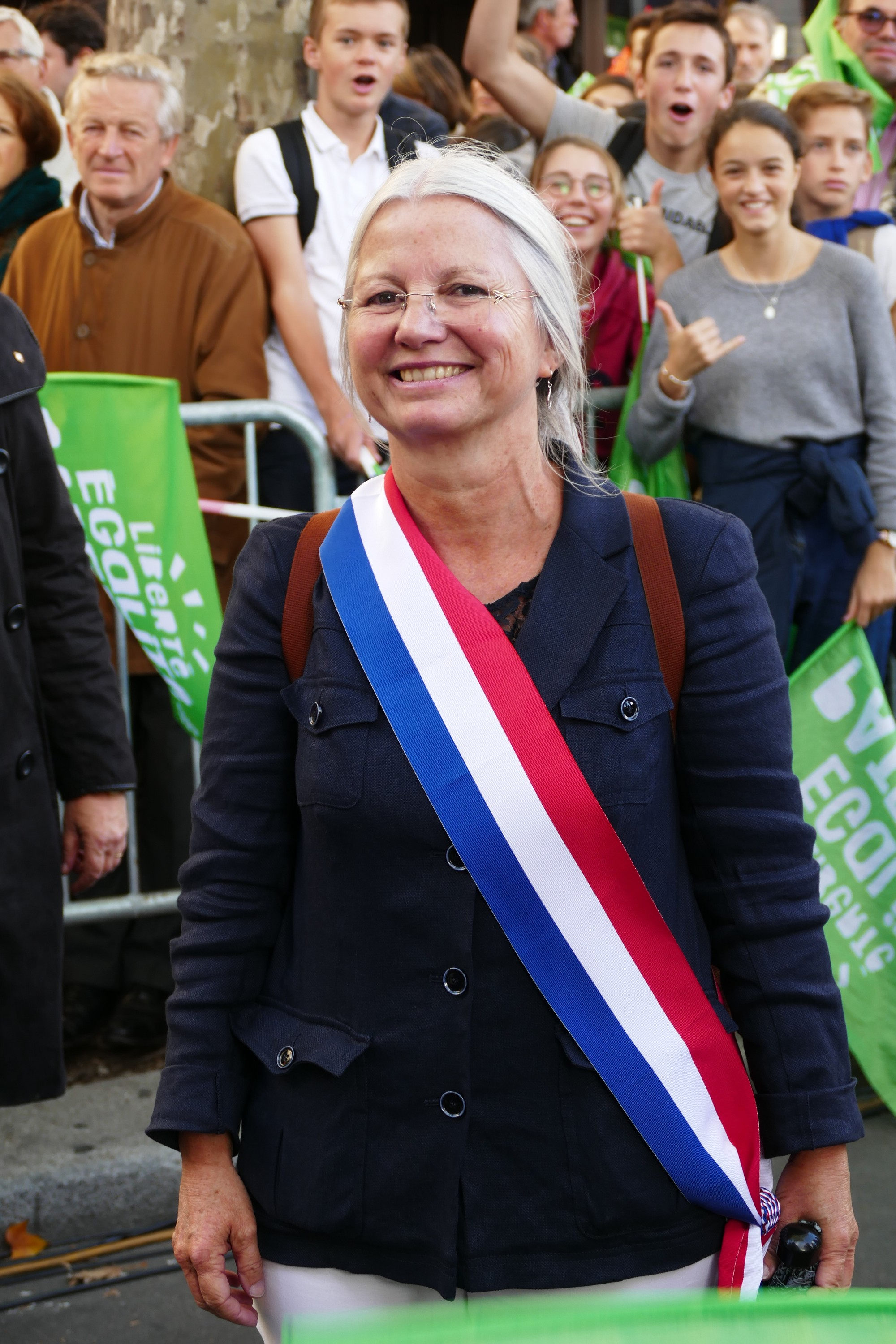

Member of the National Assembly for Oise's 2nd constituency
- In office 21 June 2017 – 21 June 2022
- Preceded by: Jean-François Mancel
- Succeeded by: Philippe Ballard

Personal details
- Born: 2 June 1964 (age 60); Paris, France
- Political party: La République En Marche! (until 2019); UDI (since 2019)

Agnès Thill (French pronunciation: [aɲɛs til]; born 2 June 1964) is a French politician who served as a member of the National Assembly from 2017 to 2022, representing the department of Oise.

In parliament, Thill served as member of the Committee on Cultural Affairs and Education. In addition to her committee assignments, she was a member of the parliamentary friendship groups with the Democratic Republic of the Congo, Mali and the Central African Republic.

In 2019, Thill publicly opposed a bioethics law extending to homosexuals and single women to have free access to fertility treatments such as in vitro fertilisation (IVF) under France's national health insurance; it was one of the campaign promises of President Emmanuel Macron, and marked the first major social reform of his five-year term. She was subsequently excluded from La République en Marche and later joined the Union of Democrats and Independents.

She lost her seat in the first round of the 2022 French legislative election.

== See also ==
- 2017 French legislative election
