= Maxime Minot =

French politician

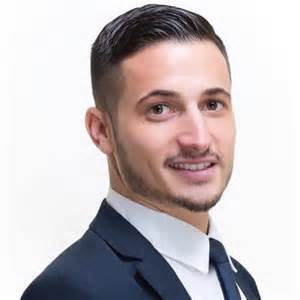

Member of the National Assembly for Oise's 7th constituency
- In office 21 June 2017 – 9 June 2024
- Preceded by: Édouard Courtial
- Succeeded by: David Magnier

Mayor of Étouy
- In office 4 April 2014 – 15 July 2017
- Preceded by: Monique Debosque
- Succeeded by: Alain Randon

Personal details
- Born: 20 July 1987 (age 38) Clermont, France
- Party: The Republicans
- Other political affiliations: UDC (2022)

Maxime Minot (born 20 July 1987) is a French politician who has represented the 7th constituency of the Oise department in the National Assembly between 2017 and 2024. A member of The Republicans (LR), he was previously the mayor of Étouy from 2014 to 2017. Minot has also held a seat in the Departmental Council of Oise for the canton of Clermont since 2021.

== Political career ==
=== Early career ===
In the 2017 presidential elections, Minot publicly denounced his party's candidate François Fillon amid the so-called Fillon affair and instead voted for Emmanuel Macron.

=== Member of the National Assembly, 2017–2024 ===
Minot was elected to the French Parliament at the 2017 legislative election. He has since been serving on the Committee on Cultural Affairs and Education. In addition to his committee assignments, he is part of the French delegation to the Inter-Parliamentary Union (IPU).

In late 2019, Minot endorsed Damien Abad as chairman of the Republicans' parliamentary group.

Minot was re-elected in the 2022 legislative election, as part of the Union of the Right and Centre.

In the run-up to the Republicans’ 2022 convention, Minot endorsed Aurélien Pradié as the party’s chairman.

In the 2024 French legislative election, Minot was unseated in a triangular election in the second round.

== Personal life ==
In July 2020, Minot came out as gay.
