= Jean-François Mancel =

French politician (born 1948)

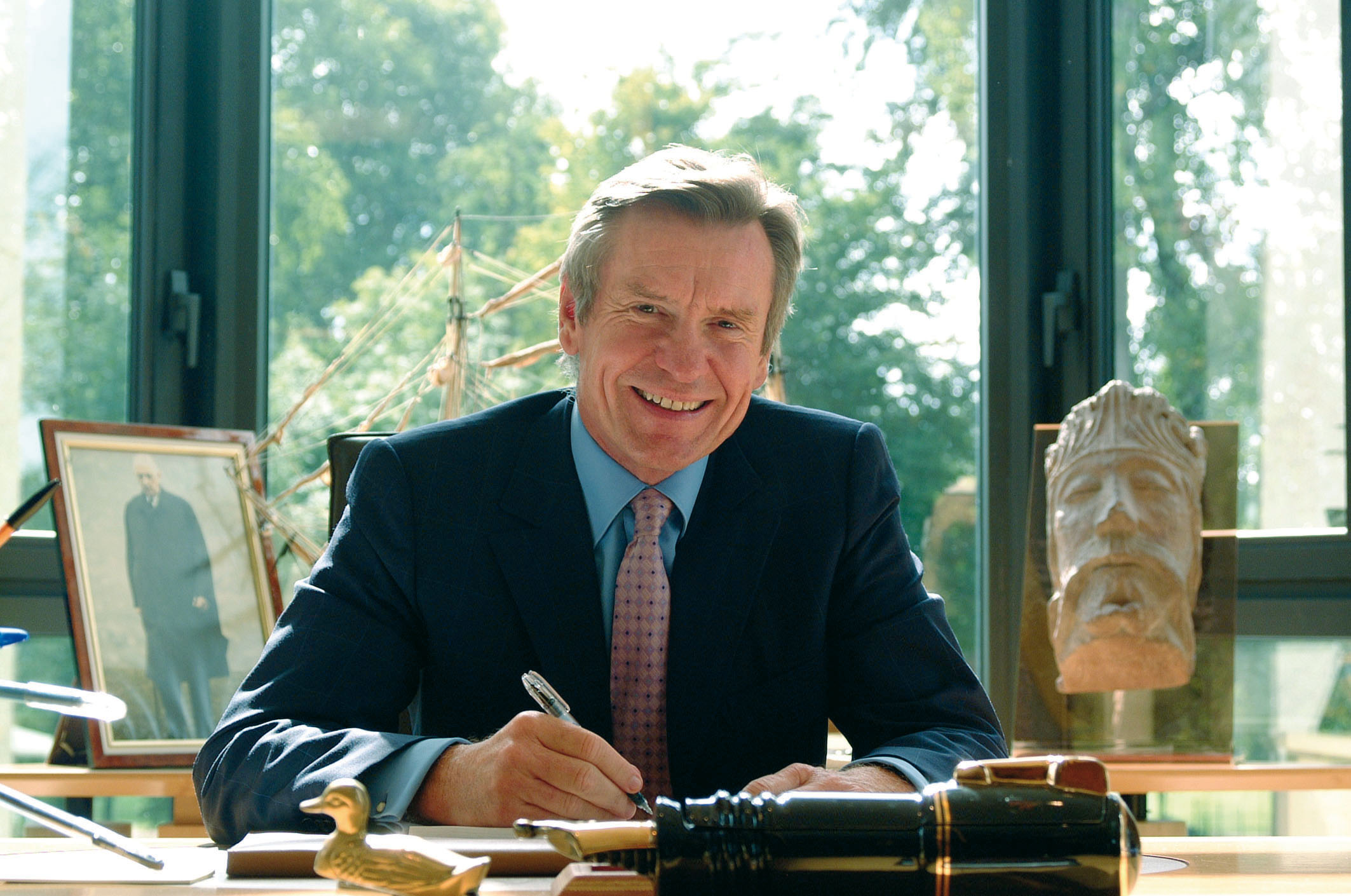
- Jean-François Mancel in 2003

Member of the National Assembly for Oise's 2nd constituency
- In office 2002–2017
- Preceded by: Béatrice Marre
- Succeeded by: Agnès Thill

Personal details
- Born: 1 March 1948 (age 78) Beauvais, France
- Party: UMP
- Education: Paris Law Faculty; Sciences Po, ÉNA

Jean-François Mancel (born 1 March 1948) is a French politician. He was a member of the National Assembly of France, representing Oise's 2nd constituency from 2002 to 2017, as a member of the Union for a Popular Movement.
