= Oise's 2nd constituency =

Constituency of the National Assembly of France

2nd constituency of Oise
- inline Constituency of the National Assembly of France

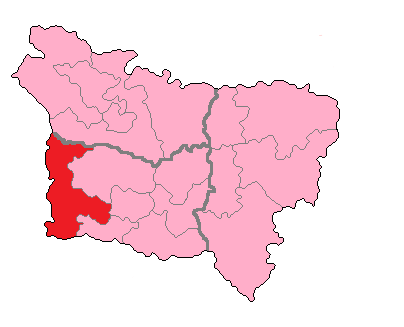
- Oise's 2nd Constituency shown within Picardie
- Deputy: Philippe Ballard; RN
- Department: Oise
- Cantons: Auneuil, Beauvais-Sud-Ouest, Chaumont-en-Vexin, Le Coudray-Saint-Germer, Formerie, Grandvilliers, Noailles, Songeons.
- Registered voters: 86,048

The 2nd constituency of Oise is a French legislative constituency in the Oise département.

== Description ==
The 2nd constituency of the Oise covers its western portion and borders Upper Normandy, it also includes the south western part of Beauvais.

Until 2017, similarly to Oise's 1st constituency the seat was a conservative stronghold since 1988 apart from the Socialist landslide at the 1997 election. At the 2012 election the vote was split by the presence of a National Front candidate in the second round but veteran Gaullist deputy Jean-François Mancel held on by less than 100 votes to claim victory.

In 2019, Agnès Thill, elected as LREM, publicly opposed a bioethics law extending to homosexual and single women free access to fertility treatments such as in vitro fertilisation (IVF) under France's national health insurance; it was one of the campaign promises of President Emmanuel Macron. She was subsequently excluded from La République en Marche and later joined the Union of Democrats and Independents.

== Historic Representation ==
Election	Member	Party
1986	Proportional representation – no election by constituency	
1988	Jean-François Mancel	RPR
1997	Béatrice Marre	PS
2002	Jean-François Mancel	UMP
2007	Jean-François Mancel	UMP
2012	Jean-François Mancel	UMP
2017	Agnès Thill	LREM
2019	Agnès Thill	UDI
2022	Philippe Ballard	RN

== Election results ==
=== 2024 ===
Legislative Election 2024: Oise's 2nd constituency
Party	Candidate	Votes	%	±%
RN	Philippe Ballard	30,823	53.20	+18.28
LR	Ludovic Castanié	12,339	21.30	n/a
LFI	Marianne Seck	10,772	18.59	+2.78
DVE	Mohamed El Aiyate	2,144	3.70	n/a
REC	Pierre Delarboulas	1,225	2.11	−0.94
LO	Renée Potchtovik	630	1.09	n/a
Turnout		57,933	96.84	+49.32
Registered electors		89,305		
RN hold		Swing		

=== 2022 ===
Legislative Election 2022: Oise's 2nd constituency
Party	Candidate	Votes	%	±%
RN	Philippe Ballard	14,440	34.92	+9.39
LREM (Ensemble)	Chanez Herbanne	8,900	21.53	-9.49
LFI (NUPÉS)	Annick Prevot	6,536	15.81	+7.58
UDI (UDC)	Agnès Thill	3,545	8.57	−13.05
DVD	Ludovic Castanié	2,685	6.49	N/A
REC	Benjamin Fougere	1,260	3.05	N/A
Others	N/A	3,981	-	−
Turnout		41,347	47.52	−0.97
2nd round result
RN	Philippe Ballard	21,451	55.83	+10.53
LREM (Ensemble)	Chanez Herbanne	16,974	44.17	−10.53
Turnout		38,425	46.54	+3.02
RN gain from LREM				

=== 2017 ===
Candidate	Label	First round		Second round	
Candidate	Label	Votes	%	Votes	%
Agnès Thill	REM	12,991	31.04	19,164	54.70
Gaëtan Dussausaye	FN	10,684	25.53	15,871	45.30
Alexis Mancel	LR	9,046	21.62		
Philippe Virolle	FI	2,914	6.96		
Jacqueline Fontaine	ECO	2,213	5.29		
Marie Le Glou	PCF	1,291	3.08		
Roland Guillaux	DLF	1,126	2.69		
Renée Potchtovik	EXG	593	1.42		
Thomas Joly	EXD	478	1.14		
Morgan Rouineau	DIV	266	0.64		
Béatrice Pernier	DVD	246	0.59		
Votes		41,848	100.00	35,035	100.00
Valid votes		41,848	97.27	35,035	90.72
Blank votes		881	2.05	2,688	6.96
Null votes		295	0.69	894	2.32
Turnout		43,024	48.49	38,617	43.52
Abstentions		45,708	51.51	50,119	56.48
Registered voters		88,732		88,736	
Source: Ministry of the Interior

=== 2012 ===
Legislative Election 2012: Oise's 2nd constituency
Party	Candidate	Votes	%	±%
UMP	Jean-François Mancel	16,564	33.36	
PS	Sylvie Houssin	15,143	30.50	
FN	Florence Italiani	11,534	23.23	
FG	Pierre Ripart	2,609	5.25	
MoDem	Sandrine Makarewicz	1,217	2.45	
Others	N/A	2,587		
Turnout		49,654	57.69	
2nd round result
UMP	Jean-François Mancel	19,654	38.97	
PS	Sylvie Houssin	19,591	38.85	
FN	Florence Italiani	11,185	22.18	
Turnout		50,430	58.61	
UMP hold				

== Sources ==
Official results of French elections from 2002: "Résultats électoraux officiels en France" (in French).
