= Arrondissements of the Oise department =

Administrative divisions of Oise, France

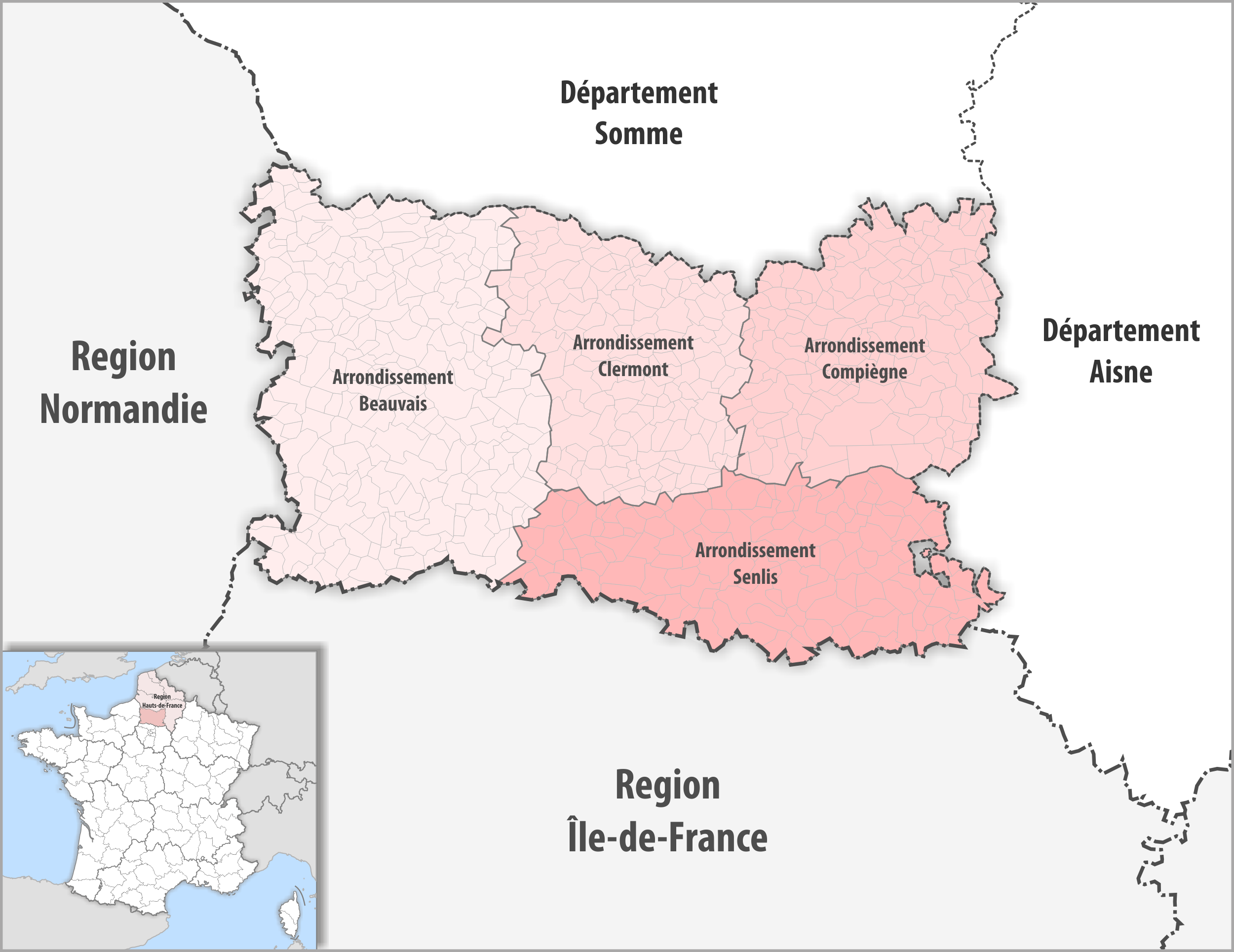
Map of arrondissements of the Oise department.

The 4 arrondissements of the Oise department are:

1. Arrondissement of Beauvais, (prefecture of the Oise department: Beauvais) with 246 communes. The population of the arrondissement was 230,887 in 2021.
2. Arrondissement of Clermont, (subprefecture: Clermont) with 146 communes. The population of the arrondissement was 130,735 in 2021.
3. Arrondissement of Compiègne, (subprefecture: Compiègne) with 156 communes. The population of the arrondissement was 182,130 in 2021.
4. Arrondissement of Senlis, (subprefecture: Senlis) with 132 communes. The population of the arrondissement was 285,086 in 2021.

== History ==
In 1800 the arrondissements of Beauvais, Clermont, Compiègne and Senlis were established. The arrondissement of Clermont was disbanded in 1926, and restored in 1942.
