= Oise's 7th constituency =

Constituency of the National Assembly of France

7th constituency of Oise
- inline Constituency of the National Assembly of France

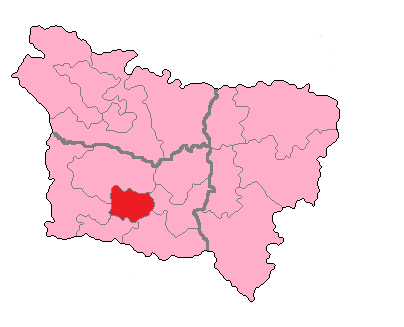
- Oise's 7th Constituency shown within Picardie
- Deputy: David Magnier; RN
- Department: Oise
- Cantons: Clermont, Creil-Nogent-sur-Oise, Liancourt, Mouy.
- Registered voters: 75,109

The 7th constituency of Oise is a French legislative constituency in the Oise département.

== Description ==
The 7th constituency of the Oise lies in the centre of the department.

From 2002 to 2017 the seat was represented by Édouard Courtial of the conservative UMP. At the 2012 election he defeated the Regional President Claude Gewerc in the second round in order to hold the seat.

== Historic Representation ==
Election	Member	Party
1986	Proportional representation – no election by constituency	
1988	Jean-Pierre Braine	PS
1993	Jean-Pierre Braine	PS
1997	Jean-Pierre Braine	PS
2002	Édouard Courtial	UMP
2007	Édouard Courtial	UMP
2011	Dominique Le Sourd	UMP
2012	Édouard Courtial	UMP
2017	Maxime Minot	LR
2022	Maxime Minot	LR
2024	David Magnier	RN

== Election results ==
=== 2024 ===
Legislative Election 2024: Oise's 7th constituency
Party	Candidate	Votes	%	±%
HOR (Ensemble)	Ophélie Van Elsuwe	4,006	8.19	−5.69
RN	David Magnier	19,769	40.43	+15.38
DLF	Thomas Mongiraud	278	0.57	n/a
LO	Agnès Dingival	615	1.26	n/a
REC	Florence Italiani	415	0.85	−2.46
LR	Maxime Minot	10,519	21.52	−4.80
PCF (NFP)	Loïc Pen	13,289	27.18	+0.62
Turnout		48,891	97.87	+51.60
Registered electors		77,118		
2nd round result
RN	David Magnier	21,662	43.85	+3.42
PCF	Loïc Pen	16,999	34.41	+7.23
LR	Maxime Minot	10,734	21.73	0.21
Turnout		49,395	97.85	−0.03
Registered electors		77,132		
RN gain from LR				

=== 2022 ===
Legislative Election 2022: Oise's 7th constituency
Party	Candidate	Votes	%	±%
PCF (NUPÉS)	Loïc Pen	9,275	26.56	+7.18
LR (UDC)	Maxime Minot	9,191	26.32	-0.98
RN	Tristan Szyszka	8,747	25.05	+3.91
HOR (Ensemble)	Ophélie Van Elsuwe	4,845	13.88	−11.82
REC	Florence Italiani	1,154	3.31	N/A
PA	Agnès Boillet	713	2.04	N/A
Others	N/A	993	-	−
Turnout		34,916	46.27	−1.23
2nd round result
LR (UDC)	Maxime Minot	18,442	56.74	-3.78
PCF (NUPÉS)	Loïc Pen	14,058	43.26	N/A
Turnout		32,500	44.83	+3.22
LR hold				

=== 2017 ===
Candidate	Label	First round		Second round	
Candidate	Label	Votes	%	Votes	%
Maxime Minot	LR	9,630	27.30	17,233	60.52
Jean-François Dardenne	REM	9,066	25.70	11,244	39.48
Philippe Lambilliotte	FN	7,458	21.14		
Marie-Laure Darrigade	FI	3,050	8.65		
Alexandre Ouizille	PS	2,118	6.00		
Marie-France Boutroue	PCF	1,669	4.73		
Luc Soisson	DVD	638	1.81		
Marc Mouilleseaux	DLF	634	1.80		
Agnès Dingival	EXG	401	1.14		
Mohamad Fakallah	DVG	250	0.71		
Patricia Arnaud	DIV	238	0.67		
Veronik Okendé	DVD	119	0.34		
Votes		35,271	100.00	28,477	100.00
Valid votes		35,271	97.58	28,477	89.95
Blank votes		576	1.59	2,186	6.90
Null votes		298	0.82	996	3.15
Turnout		36,145	47.50	31,659	41.61
Abstentions		39,949	52.50	44,433	58.39
Registered voters		76,094		76,092	
Source: Ministry of the Interior

=== 2012 ===
Legislative Election 2012: Oise's 7th constituency
Party	Candidate	Votes	%	±%
UMP	Édouard Courtial	15,931	36.49	
PS	Claude Gewerc	14,188	32.49	
FN	André Fouchard	8,081	18.51	
FG	Loic Pen	3,146	7.21	
Others	N/A	2,318		
Turnout		43,664	58.13	
2nd round result
UMP	Édouard Courtial	22,351	53.87	
PS	Claude Gewerc	19,141	46.13	
Turnout		41,492	55.24	
UMP hold				

== Sources ==
Official results of French elections from 2002: "Résultats électoraux officiels en France" (in French).
