= Étouy =

- Commune
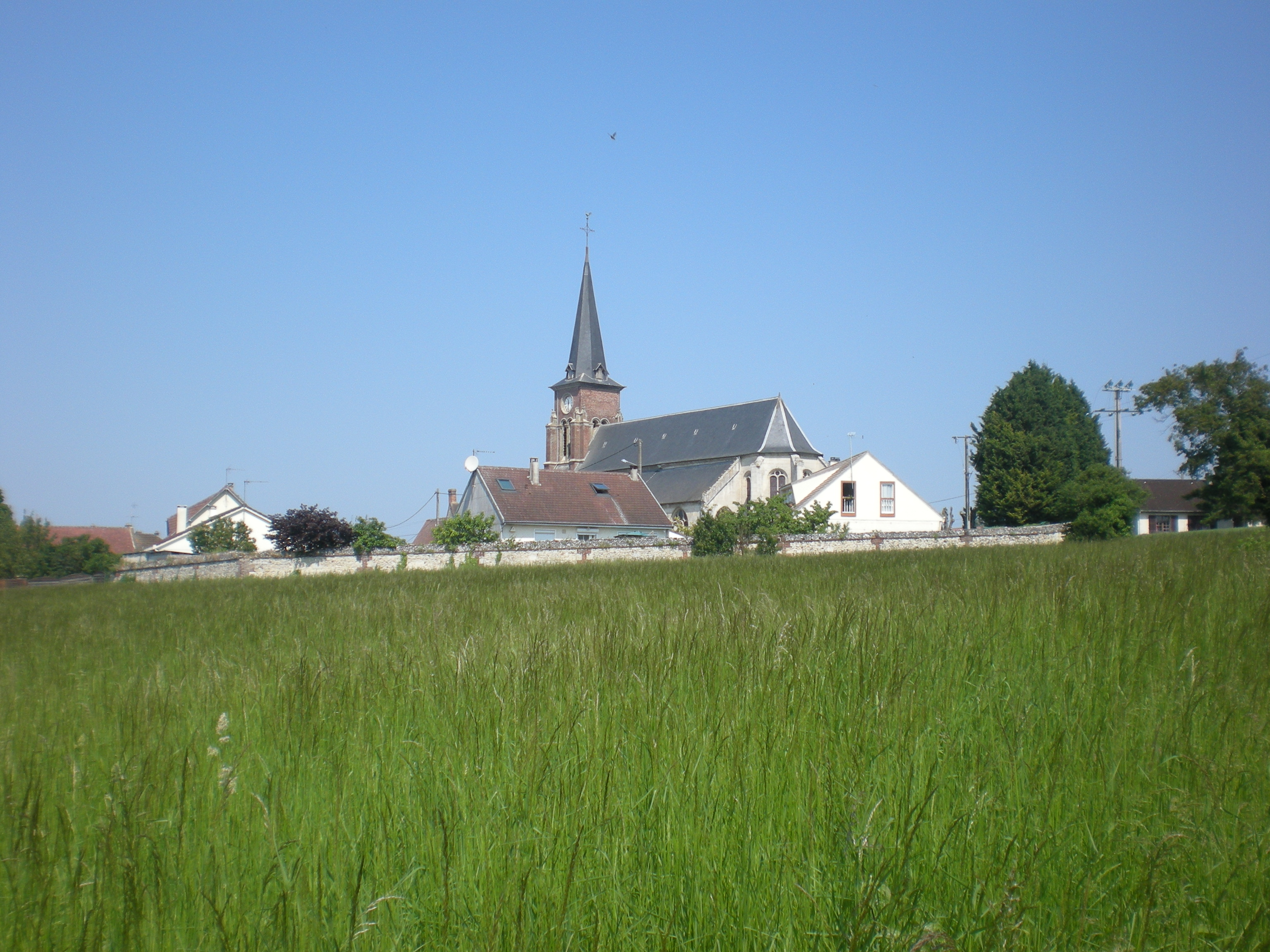
- The church in Étouy

- Coat of arms
- Location of Étouy
- Location within France Location within Hauts-de-France
- Coordinates: 49°25′11″N 2°21′53″E
- Country: France
- Region: Hauts-de-France
- Department: Oise
- Arrondissement: Clermont
- Canton: Clermont
- Intercommunality: Clermontois

Government
  - Mayor (2020–2026): Alain Randon
- Area^{1}: 9.53 km^{2} (3.68 sq mi)
- Elevation: 90 m (300 ft)
- Highest elevation: 124 m (407 ft)
- Lowest elevation: 66 m (217 ft)
- Population (2023): 844
  - Density: 88.6/km^{2} (229/sq mi)
- Time zone: UTC+01:00 (CET)
  - Summer (DST): UTC+02:00 (CEST)
- INSEE/Postal code: 60225 /60600
- ^{1} French Land Register data, which excludes lakes, ponds, glaciers > 1 km^{2} (0.386 sq mi or 247 acres) and river estuaries.

Étouy (French pronunciation: [etwi]) is a commune in the Oise department in northern France.

== See also ==
- Communes of the Oise department
