= Cantons of the Oise department =

The following is a list of the 21 cantons of the Oise department, in France, following the French canton reorganisation which came into effect in March 2015:

- Beauvais-1
- Beauvais-2
- Chantilly
- Chaumont-en-Vexin
- Clermont
- Compiègne-1
- Compiègne-2
- Creil
- Crépy-en-Valois
- Estrées-Saint-Denis
- Grandvilliers
- Méru
- Montataire
- Mouy
- Nanteuil-le-Haudouin
- Nogent-sur-Oise
- Noyon
- Pont-Sainte-Maxence
- Saint-Just-en-Chaussée
- Senlis
- Thourotte
