= 2021 Touques Airbus AS350B helicopter crash =

Helicopter crash in France

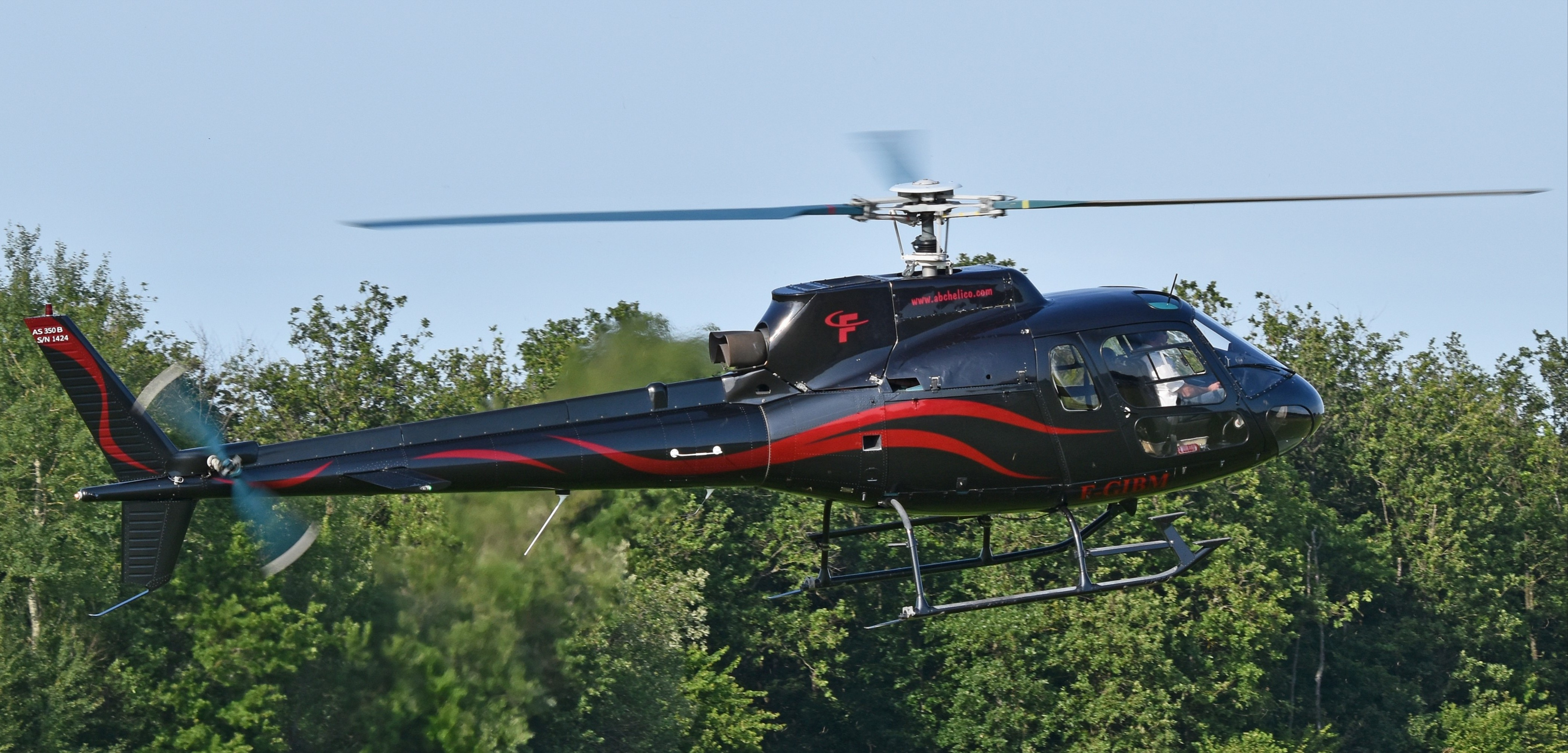
- F-GIBM, the helicopter involved in the accident, June 2019

Accident
- Date: March 7, 2021
- Summary: Loss of control during takeoff due to collision with trees
- Site: Touques, Calvados, Normandy, France; 49.356779°N 0.107457°E

Aircraft
- Aircraft type: Eurocopter AS350 Écureuil
- Operator: Dolijet
- Registration: F-GIBM
- Flight origin: Touque private helipad
- Destination: Beauvais private helipad
- Occupants: 2
- Passengers: 1
- Crew: 1
- Fatalities: 2
- Survivors: 0

On 7 March 2021, a Eurocopter AS350 Écureuil helicopter crashed in Touques, Calvados, Normandy, France. The French politician and billionaire Olivier Dassault and the pilot were killed.

== Aircraft ==
The aircraft involved in the accident was a Eurocopter AS350 Écureuil registration F-GIBM. Its registered operator was Dolijet, a company of which Dassault was the chairman. The airframe had over 8,000 flying hours and the most recent Airworthiness certificate had been provided in July 2020. On March 5, two days before the crash, the pilot and mechanic noted that the artificial horizon indicator was inoperative.

== Accident ==
The accident was investigated by France's air accident investigation bureau the BEA. The aircraft was due to take a flight from a private helipad in Touques to another privately owned helipad in Beauvais at a property owned by Dassault. The helicopter landing site, chosen the day prior, was restricted by surrounding trees. The highest of which was 23 meters. Shortly after the engine start up, the aircraft was in hover-flight, then climbed vertically next to these trees before the main rotor struck a tree at around 19 meters. At impact the tail boom separated from the aircraft, with 90% of the rivets shearing. The impact also led to an overtorque on the main rotor hub, which ripped away the front passenger seats. The aircraft yawed whilst flying forward, fell and struck the ground around 50 meters from the take off point.

== Causes ==
The BEA concluded that the landing site chosen had restricted the possibility of a safe manoeuvre for take off, and the pilot had a small safety margin with tree branches that were in shade. They believed that the pilot may have had difficulty assessing the distance to the branches due to the shade and low light contrast. The BEA issued two safety recommendations in their report. These were in respect to training for the use of this type of aircraft in confined areas, and furthermore awareness of ageing performance of the visual system.
