= Courtieux =

- Commune
- Location of Courtieux
- Location within France Location within Hauts-de-France
- Coordinates: 49°23′16″N 3°05′22″E
- Country: France
- Region: Hauts-de-France
- Department: Oise
- Arrondissement: Compiègne
- Canton: Compiègne-1
- Intercommunality: Lisières de l'Oise

Government
  - Mayor (2022–2026): Nathalie Chevot
- Area^{1}: 2.62 km^{2} (1.01 sq mi)
- Elevation: 41 m (135 ft)
- Highest elevation: 146 m (479 ft)
- Lowest elevation: 36 m (118 ft)
- Population (2023): 171
  - Density: 65.3/km^{2} (169/sq mi)
- Time zone: UTC+01:00 (CET)
  - Summer (DST): UTC+02:00 (CEST)
- INSEE/Postal code: 60171 /60350
- ^{1} French Land Register data, which excludes lakes, ponds, glaciers > 1 km^{2} (0.386 sq mi or 247 acres) and river estuaries.

Courtieux is a commune in the Oise department in northern France.

== See also ==
- Communes of the Oise department
