= Frédéric Pierre Vos =

French politician (born 1963)

Frédéric-Pierre Vos

Member of the French National Assembly for Oise's 5th constituency
- Incumbent
- Assumed office 18 July 2024
- Preceded by: Pierre Vatin

Personal details
- Born: 10 March 1963 (age 63) Draveil
- Party: National Rally
- Other political affiliations: Rally for the Republic (1980s)

Frédéric-Pierre Vos (born 10 March 1963) is a French lawyer and politician of the National Rally who was elected as a deputy for Oise's 5th constituency in 2024.

== Biography ==
Frédéric-Pierre Vos was born on March 10, 1963 in Draveil. Before entering politics he was a project manager and then a legal deputy director in the commercial sector. He began training as a lawyer in 2000 and became a member of the Paris bar.

He was previously a member of the Rally for the Republic and was a secretary for the Rally for Another Policy youth movement promoting Gaullist views in the party. He later argued that The Republicans had moved too far from a conservative identity and that a hung parliament in France would present more opportunities for the National Rally. He is considered to be a close friend of Marine Le Pen. During the 2024 French legislative election, he was elected to Oise's 5th constituency defeating French Socialist Party candidate Bertrand Brassens in the second round.
