= Oise's 3rd constituency =

Constituency of the National Assembly of France

3rd constituency of Oise
- inline Constituency of the National Assembly of France

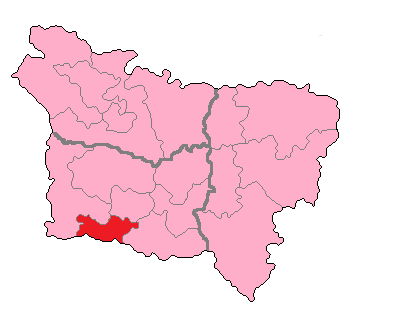
- Oise's 3rd Constituency shown within Picardie
- Deputy: Alexandre Sabatou; RN
- Department: Oise
- Cantons: Creil-Sud, Méru, Montataire, Neuilly-en-Thelle.
- Registered voters: 71,318

The 3rd constituency of Oise is a French legislative constituency in the Oise département.

== Description ==
The 3rd constituency of the Oise lies on the southern edge of the department and includes the town of Creil. It is separated from the Paris urban area by the large Oise-Pays-de-France Natural Park.

The seat was in the hands of Socialist Michel Françaix from 1997 to 2017.

== Historic Representation ==
Election	Member	Party
1986	Proportional representation – no election by constituency	
1988	Jean Anciant	PS
1993	Ernest Chénière	RPR
1997	Michel Françaix	PS
2002	Michel Françaix	PS
2007	Michel Françaix	PS
2012	Michel Françaix	PS
2017	Pascal Bois	LREM
2022	Alexandre Sabatou	RN

== Election results ==
=== 2024 ===
Legislative Election 2024: Oise's 3rd constituency
Party	Candidate	Votes	%	±%
RN	Alexandre Sabatou	19,487	43.10	+12.96
LFI (NFP)	Amadou Ka	14,149	31.29	+4.98
EXD	Nadège Legris	573	1.27	N/a
RE (Ensemble)	Pascal Bois	8,556	18.92	−2.52
UDI	Marie Ferreira	1,931	4.27	n/a
LO	Roland Szpirko	522	1.15	n/a
Turnout		45,218	97.34	+55.85
Registered electors		74,495		
2nd round result
RN	Alexandre Sabatou	21,940	51.96	+8.86
LFI	Amadou Ka	20,281	48.04	+ 16.75
Turnout		42,221	90.89	−6.45
Registered electors		74,512		
RN hold		Swing		

=== 2022 ===
Legislative Election 2022: Oise's 3rd constituency
Party	Candidate	Votes	%	±%
RN	Alexandre Sabatou	9,031	30.14	+8.55
LFI (NUPÉS)	Valérie Labatut	8,900	26.31	+8.27
LREM (Ensemble)	Pascal Bois	6,415	21.41	−6.98
LR (UDC)	Christophe Dietrich	3,184	10.63	−1.19
REC	Julie Roussel	1,100	3.67	N/A
FGR	Johann Lucas	891	2.97	N/A
PA	Maxime Bouilly Geronimi	708	2.36	N/A
Others	N/A	753	-	−
Turnout		29,967	41.49	+4.31
2nd round result
RN	Alexandre Sabatou	14,066	52.42	+10.10
LFI (NUPÉS)	Valérie Labatut	12,769	47.58	N/A
Turnout		26,835	41.00	+3.82
RN gain from LREM				

=== 2017 ===
Candidate	Label	First round		Second round	
Candidate	Label	Votes	%	Votes	%
Pascal Bois	REM	8,658	28.39	14,300	57.68
Philippe Murer	FN	6,584	21.59	10,493	42.32
Frédérique Leblanc	LR	3,605	11.82		
Michel Françaix	DVG	3,602	11.81		
Karine Monségu	FI	3,029	9.93		
Karim Boukhachba	PCF	1,257	4.12		
Johann Lucas	PS	1,217	3.99		
Jean-Marc Gateau	DLF	689	2.26		
Odette Chauve	ECO	422	1.38		
Caroline Alamachère	EXD	325	1.07		
Roland Szpirko	EXG	317	1.04		
Florian Mourat	DIV	304	1.00		
Marie-José Maubert	ECO	258	0.85		
Karim Guerda	DIV	183	0.60		
Mounia Tantan	ECO	43	0.14		
Votes		30,493	100.00	24,793	100.00
Valid votes		30,493	97.68	24,793	90.25
Blank votes		531	1.70	2,012	7.32
Null votes		192	0.62	665	2.42
Turnout		31,216	42.25	27,470	37.18
Abstentions		42,672	57.75	46,419	62.82
Registered voters		73,888		73,889	
Source: Ministry of the Interior

=== 2012 ===
Legislative Election 2012: Oise's 3rd constituency
Party	Candidate	Votes	%	±%
PS	Michel Françaix	14,773	38.70	
UMP	Marie-Christine Salmona	8,751	22.92	
FN	Karim Ouchikh	7,213	18.89	
FG	Jean-Pierre Bosino	3,776	9.89	
EELV	Isabelle Maupin	1,117	2.93	
Others	N/A	2,545		
Turnout		38,175	53.52	
2nd round result
PS	Michel Françaix	20,422	57.86	
UMP	Marie-Christine Salmona	14,873	42.14	
Turnout		35,295	49.49	
PS hold				

== Sources ==
Official results of French elections from 2002: "Résultats électoraux officiels en France" (in French).
