= Alexandre Ouizille =

French politician (born 1988)

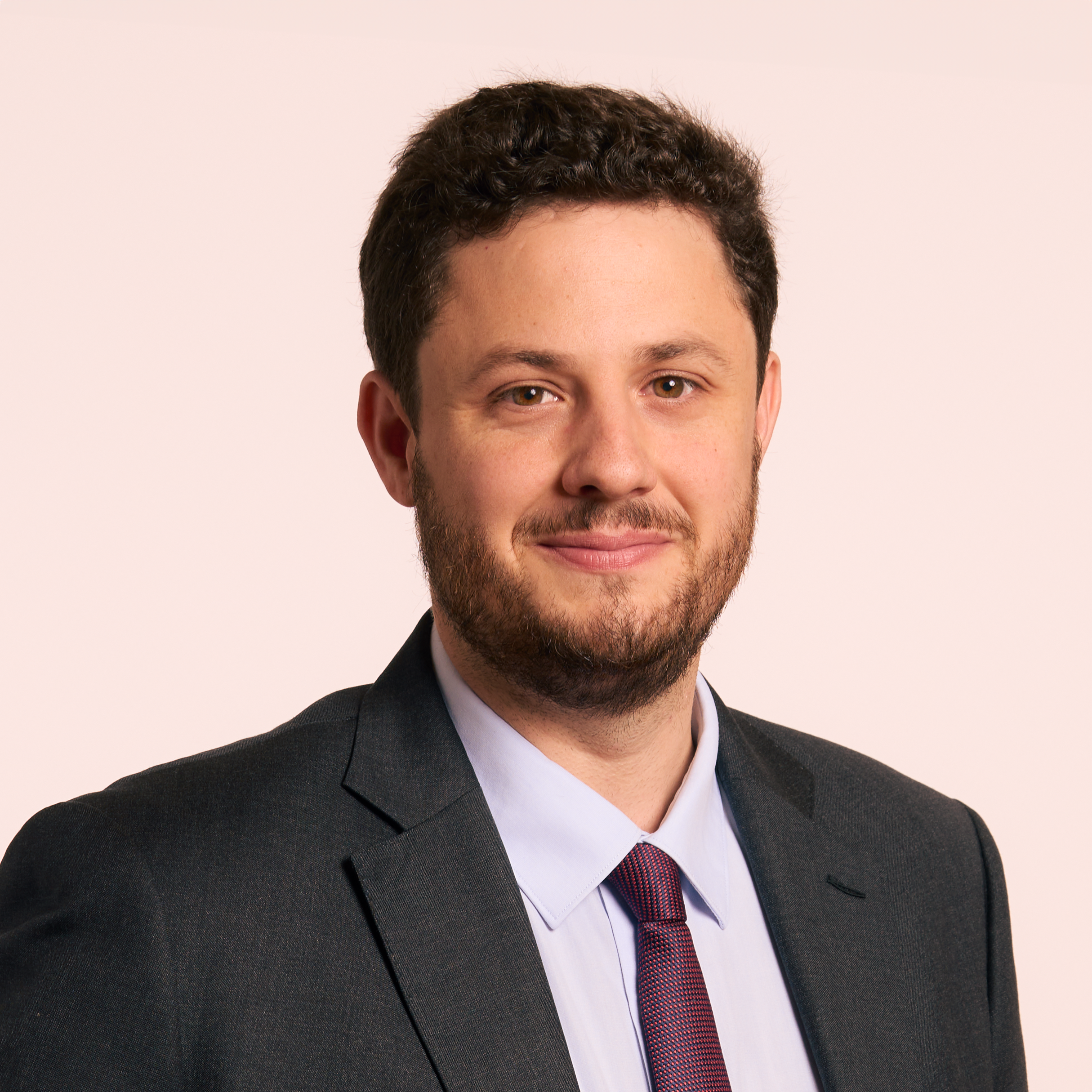
- Ouizille in 2023

Member of the Senate
- Incumbent
- Assumed office 2 October 2023
- Constituency: Oise

Personal details
- Born: 18 June 1988 (age 37)
- Party: Socialist Party

Alexandre Ouizille (born 18 June 1988) is a French politician of the Socialist Party (PS) who has been serving as a member of the Senate since 2023.

== Political career ==
Ouizille was a candidate for Oise's 7th constituency in the 2017 legislative election, and was a member of the Regional Council of Hauts-de-France until his election to the Senate.

In 2025, Ouizille authored the Senate's much-publicized report alleging that Nestlé Waters lobbied France's government to make possible the sale of branded mineral water that circumvented stringent French regulations, effectively misleading consumers.
