= Édouard Courtial =

French politician

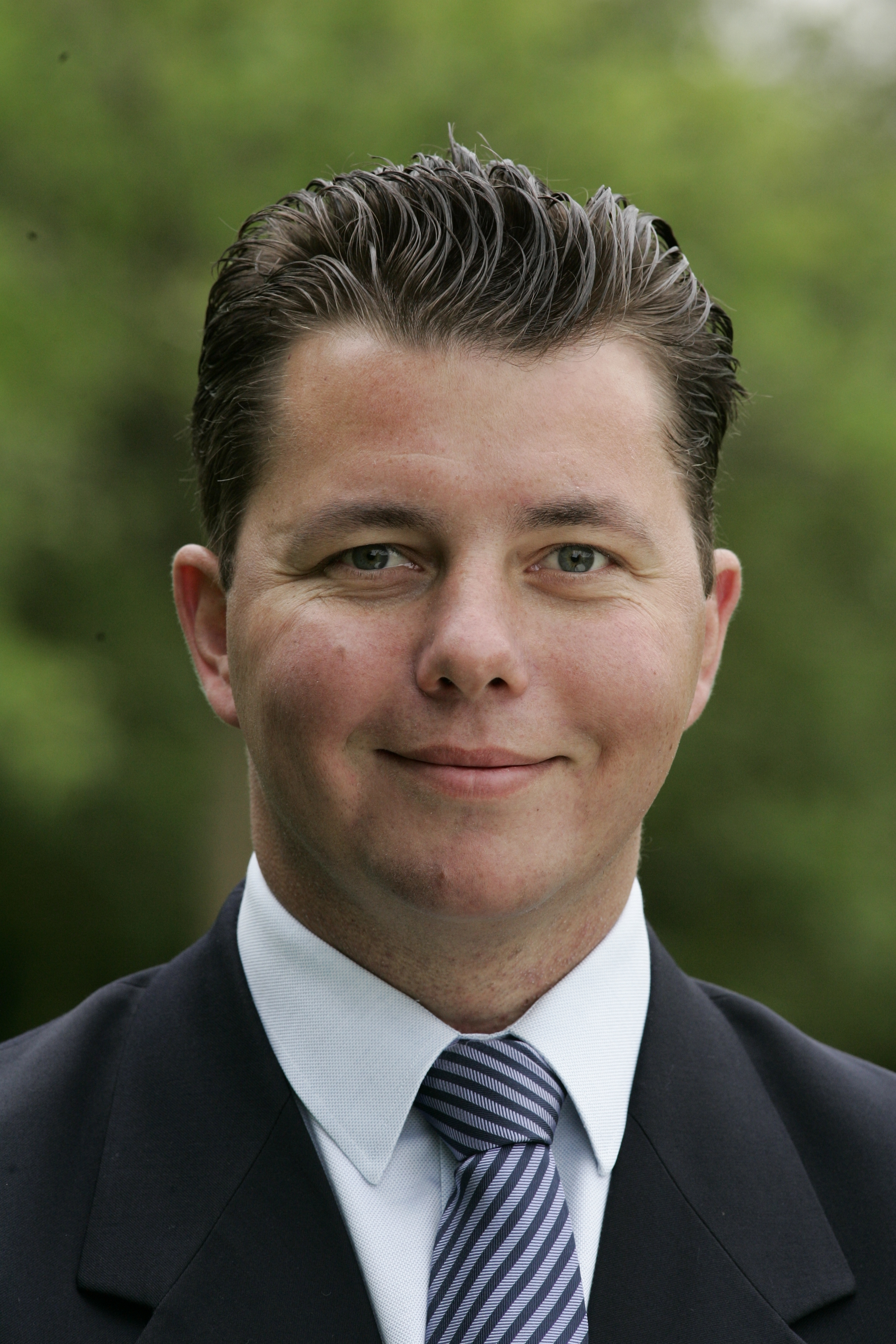
- Courtial in 2007

Member of the French Senate for Oise
- Incumbent
- Assumed office 1 October 2017

Member of the National Assembly for Oise's 7th constituency
- In office 2012–2017
- Preceded by: Dominique Le Sourd
- Succeeded by: Maxime Minot

Personal details
- Born: 28 June 1973 (age 52) Neuilly-sur-Seine, France
- Party: The Republicans
- Education: Lycée Saint-Jean-de-Passy
- Alma mater: Paris Dauphine University; ESSEC Business School

Édouard Courtial (born 28 June 1973 in Neuilly-sur-Seine) is a French politician of The Republicans who currently serves as a member of the French Senate, representing the Oise department.

== Political positions ==
Courtial cosigned a bill that would allow the French Internal Revenue Services to remove French Citizenship from French citizens who live outside of the French territories and don't establish their primary fiscal residence in France. After being nominated as Under-secretary for French expatriates affairs, he removed his name from the bill and explained his reasons in an interview for lepetitjournal.com and during the Assembly of the Representatives of the French living abroad.

In the UMP's 2012 leadership election, Courtial endorsed Jean-François Copé.

In the Republicans’ 2016 presidential primaries, Courtial endorsed Nicolas Sarkozy as the party's candidate for the office of President of France. In the Republicans’ 2017 leadership election, he endorsed Laurent Wauquiez.
