= Pascal Bois =

French politician (born 1959)

Deputy of the National Assembly for Oise's 3rd constituency
- In office 21 June 2017 – 21 June 2022
- Preceded by: Michel Françaix
- Succeeded by: Alexandre Sabatou

Personal details
- Born: 3 December 1959 (age 66) Paris, France
- Party: Renaissance
- Education: University of Burgundy

Pascal Bois (born 3 December 1959) is a French politician of Renaissance (RE) who served as a member of the French National Assembly from 2017 to 2022, representing the 3rd constituency of the department of Oise.

== Political career ==
In parliament, Bois served as member of the Committee on Cultural Affairs and Education. In this capacity, he co-authored (together with Constance Le Grip) a 2021 report on the copyright law of France.

In addition to his committee assignments, Bois was a member of the French parliamentary friendship groups with the Dominican Republic, Georgia, India and Jamaica.

Bois lost his seat in the first round of the 2022 French legislative election.

== Political positions ==
In July 2019, Bois decided not to align with his parliamentary group's majority and became one of 52 LREM members who abstained from a vote on the French ratification of the European Union’s Comprehensive Economic and Trade Agreement (CETA) with Canada.

== Controversy ==
In December 2021, amid the COVID-19 pandemic in France, the garage of Bois’s house in Chambly and his car were set on fire and an adjacent wall scrawled with graffiti by suspected anti-vaccination protesters.

== See also ==
- 2017 French legislative election
