= Oise's 5th constituency =

Constituency of the National Assembly of France

5th constituency of Oise
- inline Constituency of the National Assembly of France

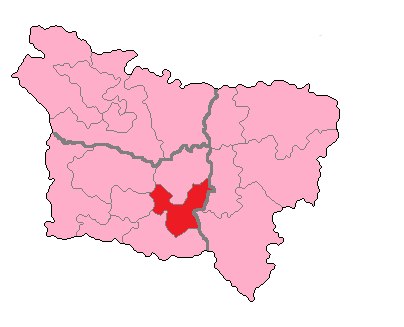
- Oise's 5th Constituency shown within Picardie
- Deputy: Frédéric Pierre Vos; RN
- Department: Oise
- Cantons: Attichy, Compiègne-Sud-Est, Compiègne-Sud-Ouest, Crépy-en-Valois, Estrées-Saint-Denis.
- Registered voters: 71,394

The 5th constituency of Oise is a French legislative constituency in the Oise département.

== Description ==
The 5th constituency of the Oise lies in the east of the department and includes the south of Compiègne.

The seat was held by conservative Lucien Degauchy from 1993 to 2017.

== Historic Representation ==
Election	Member	Party
1986	Proportional representation – no election by constituency	
1988	Lionel Stoléru	DVG
1993	Lucien Degauchy	RPR
1997	Lucien Degauchy	RPR
2002	Lucien Degauchy	UMP
2007	Lucien Degauchy	UMP
2012	Lucien Degauchy	UMP
2017	Pierre Vatin	LR
2022	Pierre Vatin	LR
2024	Frédéric Pierre Vos	National Rally

== Election results ==
=== 2024 ===
Legislative Election 2024: Oise's 5th constituency
Party	Candidate	Votes	%	±%
LO	Hélène Becherini	503	1.06	n/a
LR	Pierre Vatin	8,427	17.70	−5.49
PS (NFP)	Bertrand Brassens	10,491	22.03	n/a
REC	Jean-Paul Boucher	379	0.80	−4.10
DLF	Véronique Rogez	509	1.07	n/a
RN	Frédéric Pierre Vos	20,070	42.15	+17.71
RE (Ensemble)	Etienne Diot	7,232	15.19	−4.86
Turnout		47,611	97.94	+50.54
Registered electors		73,645		
2nd round result
RN	Frédéric Pierre Vos	24,669	55.76	+13.61
PS	Bertrand Brassens	19,575	44.24	+22.21
Turnout		44,244	91.75	−6.19
Registered electors		73,645		
RN gain from RE				

=== 2022 ===
Legislative Election 2022: Oise's 5th constituency
Party	Candidate	Votes	%	±%
RN	Myriam Lamzoudi	8,362	24.44	+5.08
LR (UDC)	Pierre Vatin	7,935	23.19	+3.26
EELV (NUPÉS)	Luc Blanchard	7,298	21.33	+2.88
LREM (Ensemble)	Etienne Diot	6,860	20.05	−9.94
REC	Clary Langlois-Meurinne	1,677	4.90	N/A
PA	Régine Harray Cohen	1,029	3.01	N/A
Others	N/A	1,051	-	−
Turnout		34,212	47.40	−0.29
2nd round result
LR (UDC)	Pierre Vatin	18,430	59.78	+3.82
RN	Myriam Lamzoudi	12,399	40.22	N/A
Turnout		30,829	44.82	+3.66
LR hold				

=== 2017 ===
Candidate	Label	First round		Second round	
Candidate	Label	Votes	%	Votes	%
Emmanuelle Bour	REM	10,218	29.99	12,076	44.04
Pierre Vatin	LR	6,792	19.93	15,347	55.96
François Gachignard	FN	6,596	19.36		
Laurent Grenier	FI	2,559	7.51		
Jean Desessart	DVD	2,543	7.46		
Bertrand Brassens	PS	1,585	4.65		
Luc Blanchard	ECO	1,092	3.20		
Hélène Masure	PCF	1,053	3.09		
Augusto Fernandes	DLF	425	1.25		
Mariam Lamzoudi	DVD	350	1.03		
Fatima Massau	DVD	339	0.99		
Hélène Becherini	EXG	273	0.80		
Hassina Guenouche	DIV	157	0.46		
Gilles Nade	DIV	90	0.26		
Votes		34,072	100.00	27,423	100.00
Valid votes		34,072	98.09	27,423	91.48
Blank votes		481	1.38	1,813	6.05
Null votes		184	0.53	742	2.48
Turnout		34,737	47.69	29,978	41.16
Abstentions		38,103	52.31	42,861	58.84
Registered voters		72,840		72,839	
Source: Ministry of the Interior

=== 2012 ===
Legislative Election 2012: Oise's 5th constituency
Party	Candidate	Votes	%	±%
UMP	Lucien Degauchy	16,118	39.40	
PRG	Fabrice Dalongeville	9,299	22.73	
FN	Jean-Paul Letourneur	6,912	16.90	
PS	Bertrand Brassens	4,680	11.44	
FG	Géraldine Minet	1,466	3.58	
Others	N/A	2,435		
Turnout		40,910	57.30	
2nd round result
UMP	Lucien Degauchy	22,332	57.85	
PRG	Fabrice Dalongeville	16,269	42.15	
Turnout		38,601	54.07	
UMP hold				

== Sources ==
Official results of French elections from 2002: "Résultats électoraux officiels en France" (in French).
