= Claire Marais-Beuil =

French politician (born 1958)

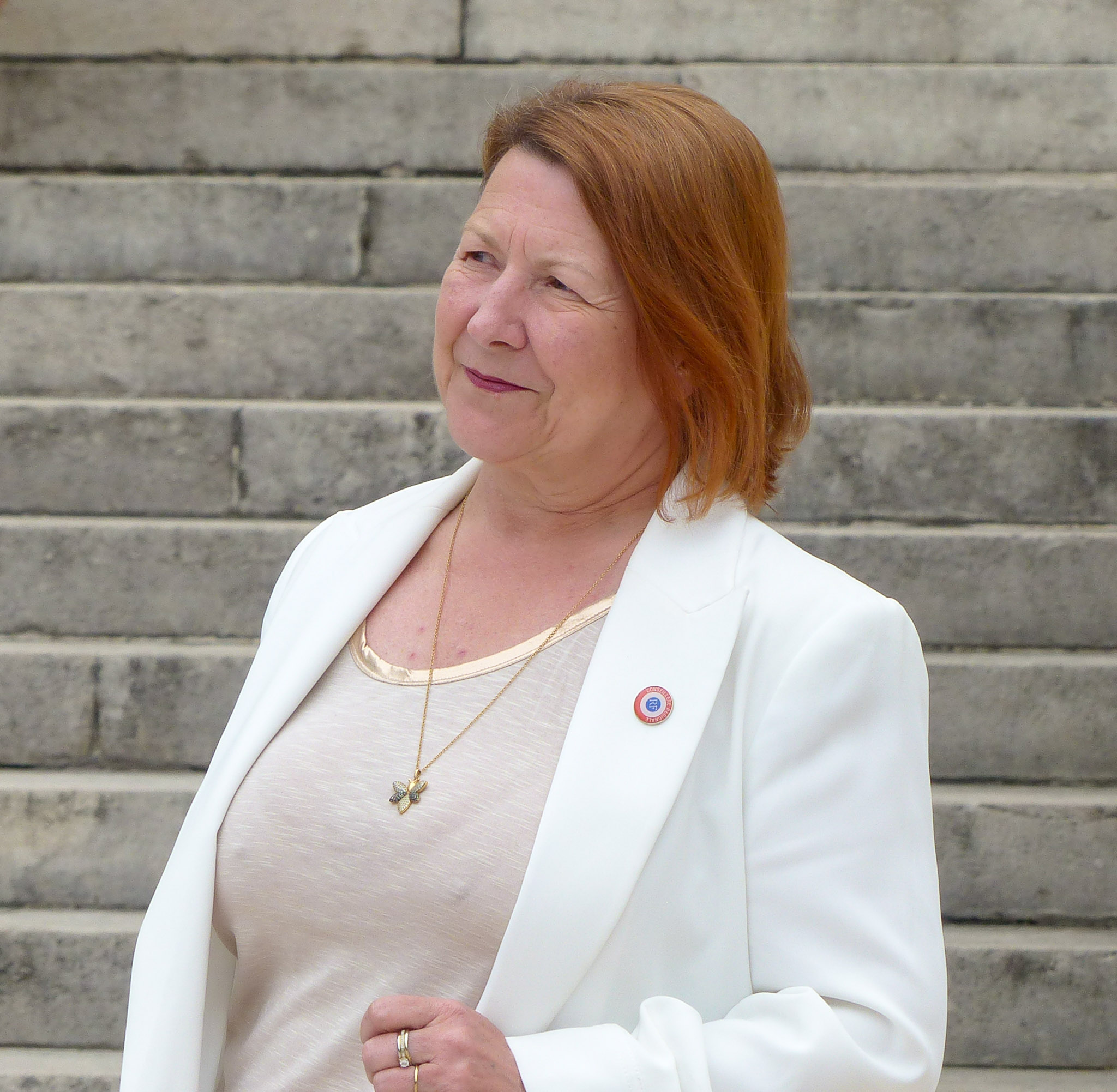
- Claire Marais-Beuil in 2024

Member of the National Assembly for Oise's 1st constituency
- Incumbent
- Assumed office 18 July 2024
- Preceded by: Victor Habert-Dassault

Personal details
- Born: 4 November 1958 (age 67) Caen, France
- Party: National Rally
- Occupation: politician

Claire Marais-Beuil (born 4 November 1958) is a French politician from the National Rally. In the 2024 French legislative election, she was elected deputy for Oise's 1st constituency.

== Electoral history ==
Year	Party	Constituency	1st ^{round}			2nd ^{round}		
Year	Party	Constituency	%	Votes	Issue	%	Votes	Issue
2017	FN	Oise 1st	18.12	7,340	3rd			
2021	RN	Oise 1st	15.27	3,233	2nd	19.59	3,679	beaten
2024	RN	Oise 1st	46.19	24,621	1st	51.69	26,824	elected

== See also ==
- List of deputies of the 17th National Assembly of France
