= Patrick Experton =

French test pilot (1941 or 1942 – 2025)

insert a caption here

Patrick Experton (14 December 1941 – 16 July 2025) was a French test pilot who worked for the French aerospace company Dassault Aviation from 1978 until his retirement in 2002.

== Life and career ==
A graduate of the French Air Force Academy Class of 1962, Patrick Experton was first assigned to the EC Roussillon flying Mirage IIIE aircraft, then to the EC Alsace in Dijon, also flying Mirage III. He was then transferred to the CEV (Centre D'essais en Vol) in Istres, and subsequently to the USAF Test Pilot School at Edwards Air Force Base, California in the mid-1970s, becoming the first French pilot to fly the McDonnell Douglas F-15 Eagle. At the time, the Giscard d'Estaing administration was considering an order for two wings of F-15s; the order however never materialized and instead led to the development of the Mirage 4000. He then returned to France to Istres AB with the CEV where he conducted spin trials for the newly acquired Mirage F-1C. He then commanded the EC 3/30 Lorraine squadron from 1976 to 1978 operating out of Reims AB, also one of the first units equipped with the aircraft.

Dassault Aviation hired him as a test pilot in 1978, and he assumed the lead role in the development of the Alpha Jet trainer aircraft, variants of the Mirage F-1 such as the CR reconnaissance version, as well as the Mirage 50 (first flight May 1979).

He was the lead test pilot for the Mirage IIING from 1982 to 1984 (first flight December 1982). The aircraft was an attempt by Dassault to maintain its market share with existing Mirage III customers. The project however never gained sufficient traction to clinch any significant domestic or foreign air force orders.

From the mid-1980s onwards, he became closely involved with the development of the newly acquired Mirage 2000 FBW aircraft. His most significant contribution to the program was his critical lead role in the design of the Mirage 2000-5 variant. The 2000-5 is a significantly improved version of the 2000C/RDI aircraft, with superior engine performance, weapon and sensor systems. In the mid-1990s, he switched to the business aircraft side of Dassault Aviation, leading several test programs such as the Dassault Falcon 900 and Falcon 900EX, and working on the development of the Falcon Jets next generation avionics systems. Throughout his career, and into retirement, Patrick Experton has maintained strong ties with the US flight testing community and with the Society of Experimental Test Pilots (SETP) in particular.

Experton spent much of his career at Dassault Aviation, where he served as a senior test pilot on the Mirage and Rafale fighter aircraft programs. Tributes from the French aerospace press noted his contributions to the company’s flight-test campaigns and his role in advancing Dassault’s next-generation combat aircraft.

Experton died on 16 July 2025, at the age of 83.

== Awards ==
- Knight of the Legion of Honour
- Commander of the Ordre national du Mérite
- Aeronautical Medal
