= Alexandre Sabatou =

French politician

Deputy of the National Assembly for Oise's 3rd constituency
- Incumbent
- Assumed office 22 June 2022
- Preceded by: Pascal Bois

Personal details
- Born: 18 February 1993 (age 33) Nogent-sur-Marne, France
- Party: National Rally
- Other political affiliations: Debout la France
- Education: Lycée Charlemagne
- Alma mater: ENSIC

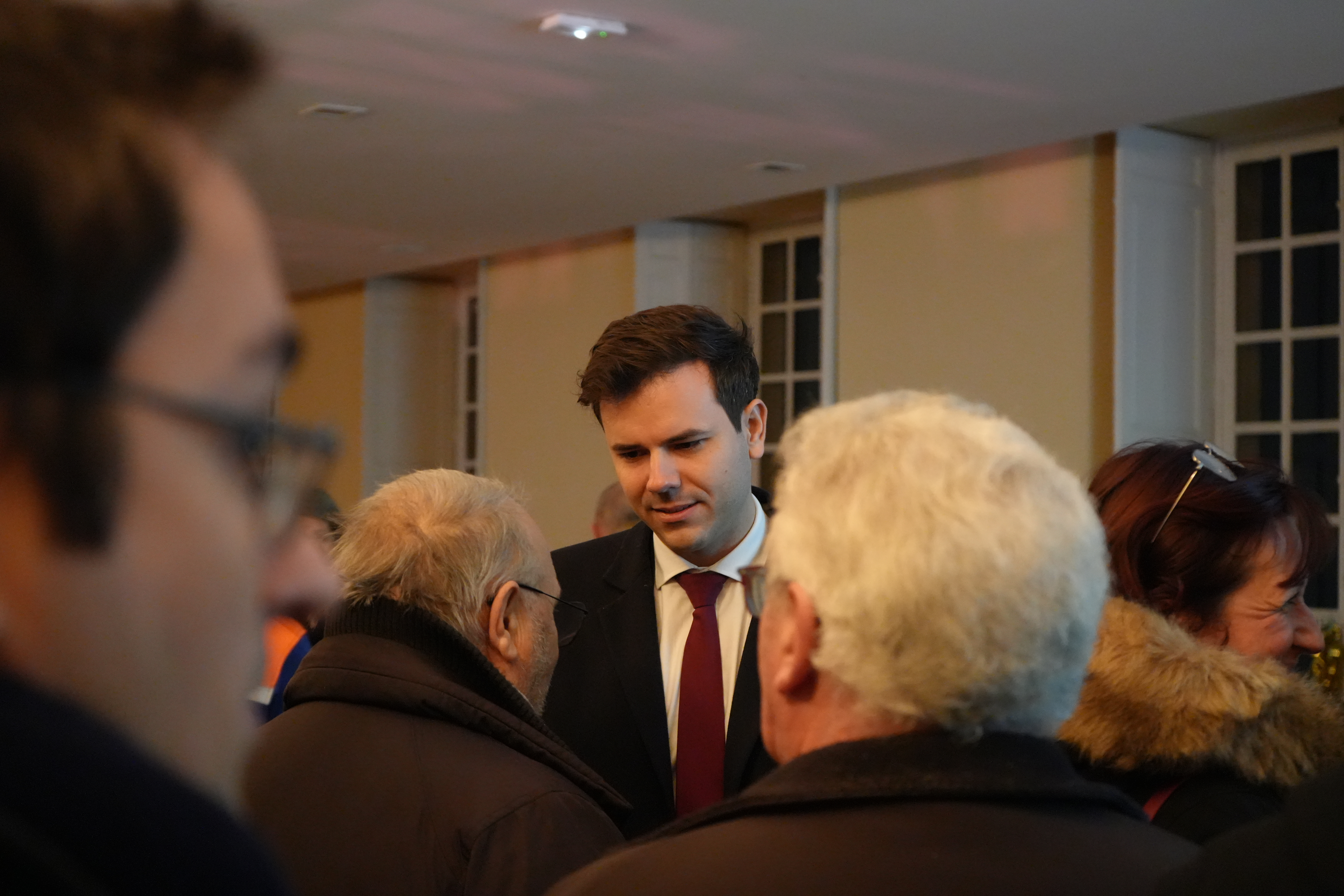

Alexandre Sabatou (born 18 February 1993) is a French politician of the National Rally who was elected as a Member of the National Assembly for Oise's 3rd constituency in 2022.

== Biography ==
Sabatou was born in February 1993. He trained as an engineer and worked as an industrial and mining engineer before becoming an information systems manager for the Direction centrale de la police aux frontières border force in 2021.

He began his political career as the head of the youth wing for Debout la France in 2018. However, he left Debout la France in 2020 and became a member of the Avenir Français (French Future) movement founded by former DLF politicians Alexandre Loubet and Thomas Ménagé.

In 2020 he joined the National Rally and stood for the party in Méru during the 2021 French regional elections. For the 2022 French legislative election Sabatou contested the seat of Oise's 3rd constituency and won the seat during the second round.
