= Philippe Ballard =

French politician

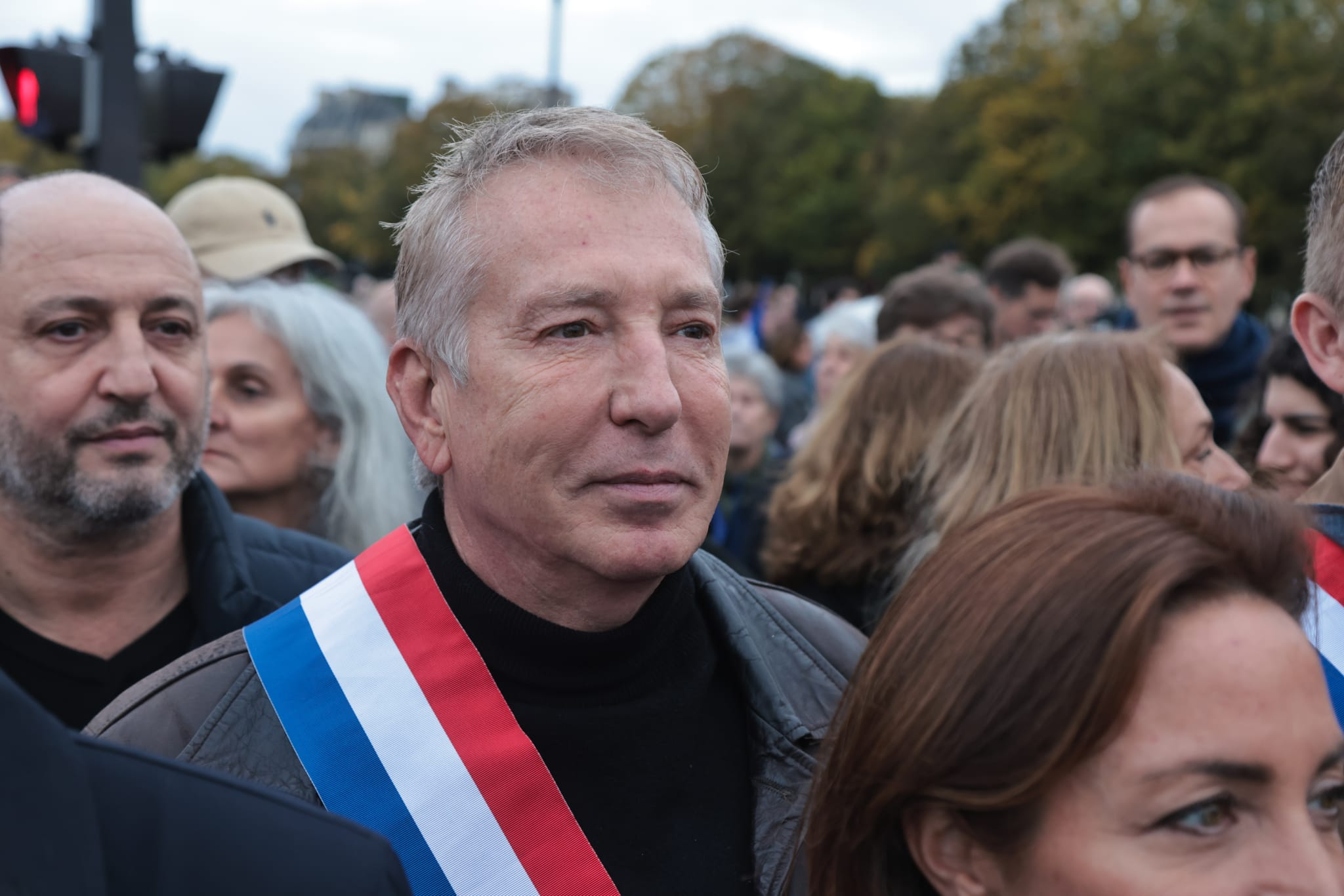
- Ballard in 2023

Member of the National Assembly for Oise's 2nd constituency
- Incumbent
- Assumed office 22 June 2022
- Preceded by: Agnès Thill

Member of the Regional Council of Île-de-France
- In office 2 July 2021 – 31 May 2023
- President: Valérie Pécresse

Personal details
- Born: 24 November 1960 (age 65) Champigny-sur-Marne, France
- Party: National Rally (since 2020)
- Other political affiliations: UDF (1989-2008)
- Profession: Journalist

Philippe Ballard (French pronunciation: [filip balaʁ]; born 24 November 1960) is a French politician and former journalist who worked as a broadcaster prior to becoming a reporter and television presenter for La Chaîne Info (LCI).

Ballard entered politics as a municipal councillor in Le Plessis-Trevise (1989–2008) as a member of the Union for French Democracy (UDF) before being elected to the Regional Council of Île-de-France in 2021 as a member of the National Rally (RN). In 2022, he was elected to represent the 2nd constituency of Oise in the National Assembly.

== Biography ==
=== Broadcasting career ===
Ballard was born in 1960. He graduated with a degree in communications from the School of Advertising, Press and Public Relations (EPPREP) in Paris. He first worked as a presenter on Sud Radio in the 1980s, followed by France Info and RTL in the 1990s.

Ballard joined La Chaîne Info (LCI) in 1994 as a news reporter and presented a number of political shows. He also covered events such as the 2008 US presidential election and the wedding of Prince William and Catherine Middleton in the United Kingdom.

He was an official of the French Confederation of Christian Workers and campaigned against LCI's proposed closure in 2014.

=== Political career ===
From 1989 to 2008, Ballard served for three terms in the municipal council (also holding office as deputy mayor) of Le Plessis-Trévise in Val-de-Marne. He was elected as a member of the Union for French Democracy party.

He joined the National Rally in September 2020 and successfully stood as a candidate in the 2021 regional election in Île-de-France. For the 2022 legislative election, Ballard ran for the 2nd constituency of Oise seat, which he won in the second round. He was reelected in the first round at the 2024 French legislative election.
