= Michel Françaix =

French politician

Deputy for Oise's 3rd constituency in the National Assembly of France
- In office 1997–2017
- Preceded by: Ernest Chénière
- Succeeded by: Pascal Bois

Personal details
- Born: May 28, 1943 (age 82)
- Party: PS

Michel Françaix (born May 28, 1943) was a member of the National Assembly of France. He represented Oise's 3rd constituency from 1997 to 2017, as a member of the Socialiste, radical, citoyen et divers gauche.
