= Oise's 1st constituency =

Constituency of the National Assembly of France

1st constituency of Oise
- inline Constituency of the National Assembly of France

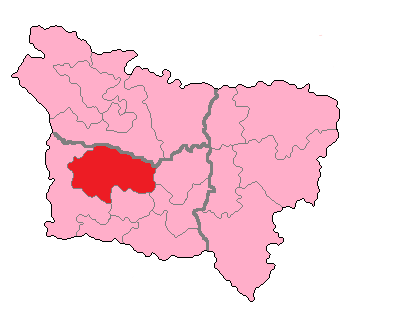
- Oise's 1st Constituency shown within Picardie
- Deputy: Claire Marais-Beuil; RN
- Department: Oise
- Cantons: Beauvais-Nord-Est, Beauvais-Nord-Ouest, Breteuil, Crèvecoeur-le-Grand, Froissy, Maignelay-Montigny, Marseille-en-Beauvaisis, Nivillers, Saint-Just-en-Chaussée.
- Registered voters: 80,790

The 1st constituency of Oise is a French legislative constituency in the Oise département.

== Description ==
The 1st constituency of the Oise lies in the north of the department and includes the northern portion of its prefecture Beauvais.

Since 1988 the seat has been held by one man Olivier Dassault with the exception of between 1997 and 2002 when it was captured by the Socialist Party. Olivier Dassault was the third generation of his family to have held elected office with his father Serge Dassault being a Senator and his grandfather Marcel Dassault being a Deputy between 1951 and 1986. Marcel Dassault was the founder of Dassault Group a large French industrial conglomerate

After Olivier Dassault died on 7 March 2021 the position was vacant until his nephew won the by-election in June 2021.

== Historic Representation ==
Election	Member	Party
1986	Proportional representation – no election by constituency	
1988	Olivier Dassault	RPR
1993	Olivier Dassault	RPR
1997	Yves Rome	PS
2002	Olivier Dassault	UMP
2007	Olivier Dassault	UMP
2012	Olivier Dassault	UMP
2017	Olivier Dassault	LR
2021	Victor Habert-Dassault	LR
2022	Victor Habert-Dassault	LR
2024	Claire Marais-Beuil	RN

== Election results ==
=== 2024 ===
Legislative Election 2024: Oise's 1st constituency
Party	Candidate	Votes	%	±%
DVC	Souhail Aouad	728	1.37	n/a
RE (Ensemble)	Matys Gutierrez	4,062	7.62	−5.22
REC	Norbert Depresles	339	0.64	−1.89
LR	Victor Habert-Dassault	13,049	24.48	−7.98
DVE	Axelle Latrasse	749	1.41	−1.00
G.s (NFP)	Roxane Lundy	9,402	17.64	−0.98
RN	Claire Marais-Beuil	24,621	46.19	+18.62
LO	Jean-Philippe Fruitier	348	0.65	n/a
Turnout		53,298	97.86	+50.01
Registered electors		83.258		
2nd round result
RN	Claire Marais-Beuil	26,824	51.69	+5.50
LR	Victor Habert-Dassault	25,070	48.31	+23.83
Turnout		51,894	96.27	−1.59
Registered electors		83,251		
RN gain from LR				

=== 2022 ===
Legislative Election 2022: Oise's 1st constituency
Party	Candidate	Votes	%	±%
LR (UDC)	Victor Habert-Dassault	12,692	32.46	-6.05
RN	David Magnier	10,780	27.57	+9.45
G.s (NUPÉS)	Roxane Lundy	7,281	18.62	+8.04
LREM (Ensemble)	Aurélie Joly	5,019	12.84	−11.29
REC	Norbert Depresles	988	2.53	N/A
DVE	Axelle Latrasse	942	2.41	N/A
Others	N/A	1,399		
Turnout		39,101	47.85	−1.93
2nd round result
LR (UDC)	Victor Habert-Dassault	20,480	58.34	-8.73
RN	David Magnier	14,625	41.66	N/A
Turnout		35,105	45.20	+0.60
LR hold				

=== 2021 by-election ===
2021 by-election: Oise's 1st constituency
Party	Candidate	Votes	%	±%
LR	Victor Habert-Dassault	12,377	58.44	
RN	Claire Marais-Beuil	3,233	15.27	
G.s	Roxane Lundy	2,607	12.31	
LREM	Karim Lamaaizi	967	4.57	
DVE	Axelle Latrasse	671	3.17	
Far-right	Dominique Ranard	662	3.13	
Others	N/A	662		
Turnout		21,758	26.41	
2nd round result
LR	Victor Habert-Dassault	15,100	80.41	
RN	Claire Marais-Beuil	3,679	19.59	
Turnout		20,025	24.31	
LR hold				

=== 2017 ===
Candidate	Label	First round		Second round	
Candidate	Label	Votes	%	Votes	%
Olivier Dassault	LR	15,597	38.51	22,885	67.07
Denis Flour	REM	9,773	24.13	11,237	32.93
Claire Marais-Beuil	FN	7,340	18.12		
Fabien Naves	FI	2,261	5.58		
Thierry Aury	PCF	2,025	5.00		
Josiane Baeckelandt	PRG	1,476	3.64		
Richard Heim	ECO	581	1.43		
Nathalie Hénoux-Deshayes	DLF	542	1.34		
Katell Mautin	EXD	363	0.90		
François Laporte	EXG	336	0.83		
Romain Cauët	DIV	203	0.50		
Votes		40,497	100.00	34,122	100.00
Valid votes		40,497	98.06	34,122	92.21
Blank votes		543	1.31	2,039	5.51
Null votes		259	0.63	843	2.28
Turnout		41,299	49.78	37,004	44.60
Abstentions		41,662	50.22	45,957	55.40
Registered voters		82,961		82,961	
Source: Ministry of the Interior

=== 2012 ===
Legislative Election 2012: Oise's 1st constituency
Party	Candidate	Votes	%	±%
UMP	Olivier Dassault	21,038	43.83	
PS	Béatrice Lejeune	14,787	30.81	
FN	Sandrine Leroy	8,320	17.34	
FG	Marie-Laure Darrigade	2,150	4.48	
Others	N/A	1,699		
Turnout		47,994	59.42	
2nd round result
UMP	Olivier Dassault	26,702	58.05	
PS	Béatrice Lejeune	19,299	41.95	
Turnout		46,001	56.94	
UMP hold				

== Sources ==
Official results of French elections from 2002: "Résultats électoraux officiels en France" (in French).
