= Roxane Lundy =

French politician (born 1995)

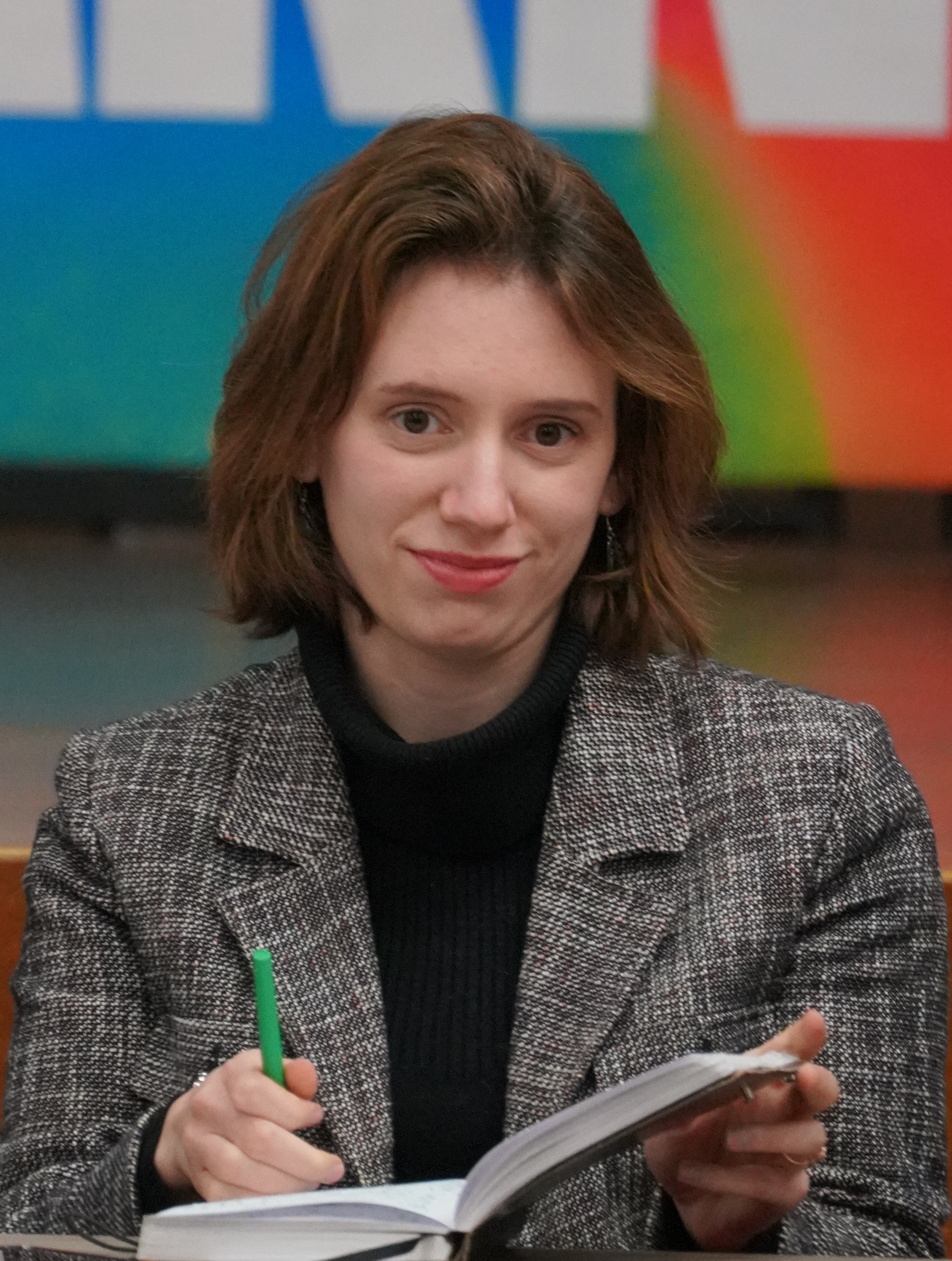
- Lundy in 2023

Leader of the Young Socialist Movement
- In office 10 February 2018 – 23 March 2018
- Preceded by: Benjamin Lucas
- Succeeded by: Collective leadership Emma Rafowicz (2020)

Personal details
- Born: 25 September 1995 (age 30) Créteil, France
- Party: Génération.s (since 2018); Socialist Party (2014–2018)
- Other political affiliations: New Popular Front
- Spouse: Benjamin Lucas (m. 2023)

Roxane Lundy (born 25 September 1995) is a French politician of Génération.s. In 2018, she served as leader of the Young Socialist Movement. She is a municipal councillor of Beauvais and a member of the Regional Council of Hauts-de-France.

== Early life and career ==
Lundy was born in Créteil in 1995, and joined the Socialist Party's youth wing Young Socialist Movement in 2014. In February 2018, she was elected president of the Young Socialist Movement, succeeding Benjamin Lucas. She left the Socialist Party in March 2018, and joined Génération.s. In the 2019 European Parliament election, she was a candidate for member of the European Parliament. In the 2020 municipal elections, she was a candidate for mayor of Beauvais, and was elected member of the municipal council. She was a candidate for Oise's 1st constituency in the 2021 by-election, and in the 2022 legislative election. She married Benjamin Lucas in September 2023, and succeeded him as a member of the Regional Council of Hauts-de-France in October 2023. In the 2024 legislative election, she was again a candidate for Oise's 1st constituency, after initially declining to run.
