= Victor Habert-Dassault =

French politician

Member of the National Assembly for Oise's 1st constituency
- In office 7 June 2021 – 9 June 2024
- Preceded by: Olivier Dassault
- Succeeded by: Claire Marais-Beuil

Personal details
- Born: 12 July 1992 (age 34) Paris, France
- Party: The Republicans
- Education: LSE

Victor Habert-Dassault (French pronunciation: [viktɔʁ abɛʁ daso]; born 12 July 1992) is a French politician of Republicans who was a member of the 15th legislature of the French Fifth Republic from 2021 to 2024, representing Oise's 1st constituency.

== Early life ==
Habert-Dassault was born on 12 July 1992 in Paris. He is the nephew of Olivier Dassault, the grandson of Serge Dassault and the great-grandson of Marcel Dassault, founder of the Dassault Group.

Habert-Dassault studied at Royal Holloway, University of London, and the London School of Economics and worked as a lawyer.

== Political career ==
On 6 June 2021, in the second round of a by-election in the first constituency of Oise, Habert-Dassualt won 80.4% of the votes cast against the candidate of the National Rally. He succeeds his uncle Olivier Dassault, who died in March of the same year.

In parliament, Habert-Dassault has been a member of the Parliamentary Office for the Evaluation of Scientific and Technological Choices since 2021.

In the run-up to the Republicans’ 2022 convention, Habert-Dassault endorsed Éric Ciotti as the party's chairman.

In the 2024 French legislative election, he stood for re-election but was unseated by the candidate of the National Rally Claire Marais-Beuil.
