= Pierre Vatin =

French politician

Member of the National Assembly for Oise's 5th constituency
- Incumbent
- Assumed office 21 June 2017
- Preceded by: Lucien Degauchy

Personal details
- Born: 21 August 1967 (age 58) Saint-Quentin, Aisne, France
- Party: Republican

Pierre Vatin (born 21 August 1967) is a French Republican politician who has represented Oise's 5th constituency in the National Assembly since 2017.

== Career ==
Vatin was parliamentary assistant to Lucien Degauchy for 21 years. When Degauchy stood down from Parliament, Vatin obtained the nomination of the Republican Party for the 2017 election. After a difficult first round, Vatin won the constituency in the second round, with 55.96% of the vote, in the second round against the En Marche candidate, Emmanuelle Bour.
