= David Magnier =

French politician (born 1972)

Member of the French National Assembly for Oise's 7th constituency
- Incumbent
- Assumed office 18 July 2024
- Preceded by: Maxime Minot

Personal details
- Born: 5 June 1972 (age 54)
- Party: National Rally (since 2021)

David Magnier (born 5 June 1972) is a French politician of the National Rally. In the 2024 legislative election, he was elected member of the National Assembly for Oise's 7th constituency. He is a former member of the yellow vest movement, and was a candidate of the Citizens' Initiative Movement for the 2019 European Parliament election. He joined the National Rally in 2021 and was its candidate for Oise's 1st constituency in the 2022 legislative election.
