= Oise =

Department in Hauts-de-France, France

Oise Oése (Picard)
- Department of France
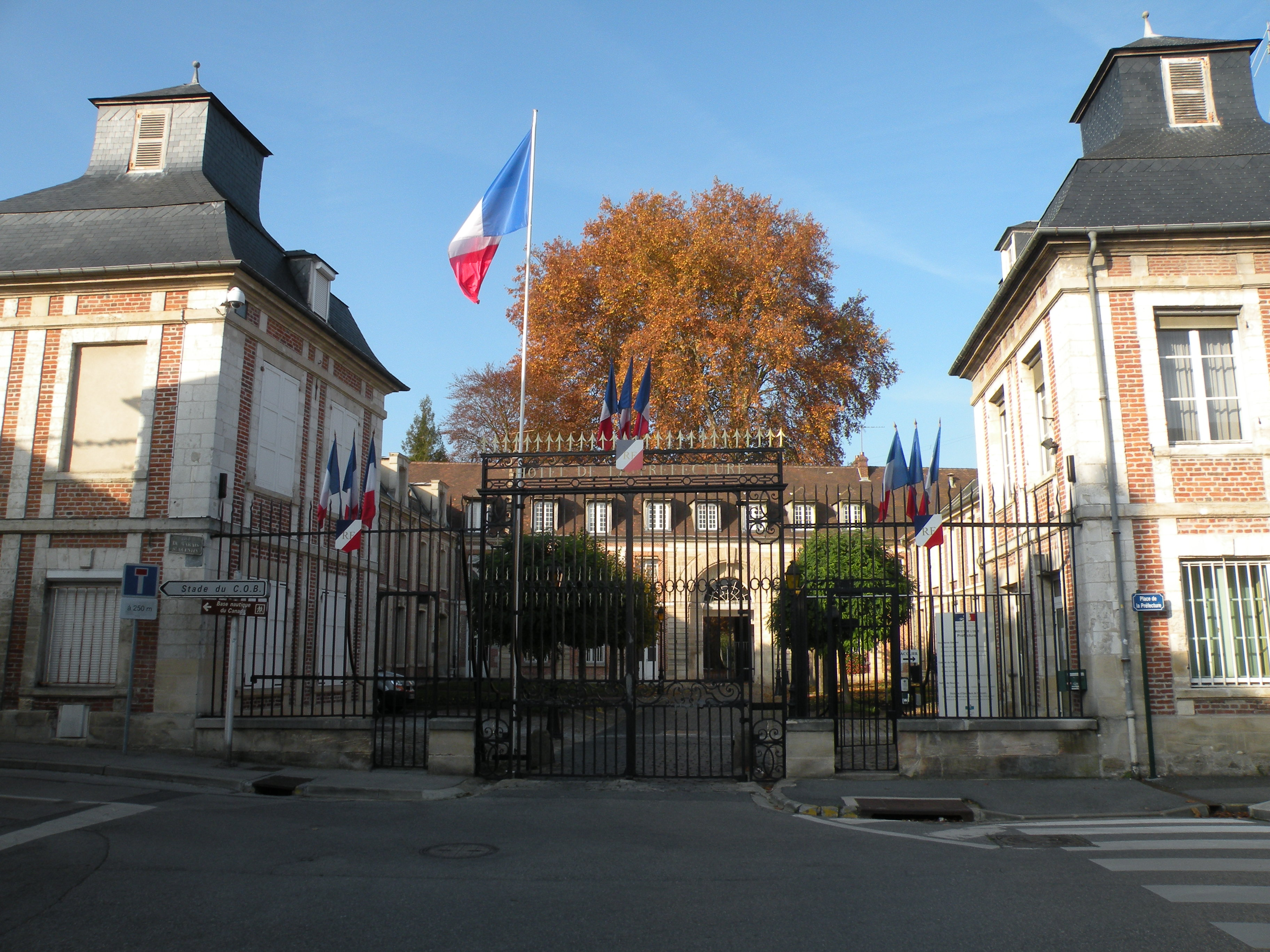
- Prefecture building in Beauvais

- Flag Coat of arms

- Location of Oise in France
- Coordinates: 49°23′N 02°25′E
- Country: France
- Region: Hauts-de-France
- Prefecture: Beauvais
- Subprefectures: Clermont; Compiègne; Senlis

Government
  - President of the Departmental Council: Nadège Lefebvre (LR)

Area^{1}
  - Total: 5,860 km^{2} (2,260 sq mi)

Population (2023)
  - Total: 829,899
  - Rank: 26th
  - Density: 142/km^{2} (367/sq mi)
- Time zone: UTC+1 (CET)
  - Summer (DST): UTC+2 (CEST)
- ISO 3166 code: FR-60
- Department number: 60
- Arrondissements: 4
- Cantons: 21
- Communes: 680
- ^1 French Land Register data, which exclude estuaries and lakes, ponds and glaciers larger than 1 km^{2}

Oise (/wɑːz/ WAHZ; French: [waz]; Picard: Oése) is a department in the north of France. It is named after the river Oise. Inhabitants of the department are called Oisiens (French: [wazjɛ̃]) or Isariens ([izaʁjɛ̃]), after the Latin name for the river, Isara. Its prefecture is Beauvais. Oise had a population of 829,899 in 2023.

== History ==
Oise is one of the original 83 departments created during the French Revolution on 4 March 1790. It consisted of parts of the provinces of Île-de-France and Picardy.

After the coalition victory at Waterloo, the department was occupied by British troops between June 1815 and November 1818. In the late 19th century, two of the best known monuments in Oise, the Château de Pierrefonds and the Château de Chantilly, were rebuilt by Eugène Viollet-le-Duc and Honoré Daumet at the behest of Napoleon III and Prince Henri, Duke of Aumale, respectively. Upon the Duke of Aumale's death in 1897, the collections of the Château de Chantilly were bequeathed to the Institut de France, which opened the Musée Condé in the castle. In his will, the Duke stated: "I want all to have access who are drawn to collections, archives, a library, none of which I believe are mediocre."

Both the Armistice of 11 November 1918 and the Armistice of 22 June 1940 were signed in Oise.

== Geography ==
Oise has been part of the region of Hauts-de-France since 1 January 2016. Until 31 December 2015, it was part of the now-former region of Picardy. Its southern border is situated 35 km north of Paris. It is surrounded by the departments of Somme, Aisne, Seine-et-Marne, Val-d'Oise, Eure and Seine-Maritime. It borders Île-de-France to the south with Seine-et-Marne and Val-d'Oise; and Normandy to the west with Eure and Seine-Maritime.

=== Principal towns ===
The most populous commune is Beauvais, the prefecture. As of 2023, there are 10 communes with more than 12,000 inhabitants:

Commune	Population (2023)
Beauvais	55,550
Compiègne	40,761
Creil	36,301
Nogent-sur-Oise	21,907
Senlis	15,157
Crépy-en-Valois	14,351
Montataire	14,257
Méru	13,897
Noyon	12,971
Pont-Sainte-Maxence	12,361

== Demographics ==
Historical population

Year	Pop.	±% p.a.
1801	350,854	—
1821	375,817	+0.34%
1831	397,725	+0.57%
1841	398,868	+0.03%
1851	403,857	+0.12%
1861	401,417	−0.06%
1872	396,804	−0.11%
1881	404,555	+0.22%
1891	401,835	−0.07%
1901	407,808	+0.15%
1911	411,028	+0.08%
1921	387,760	−0.58%
1931	407,432	+0.50%

Year	Pop.	±% p.a.
1936	402,569	−0.24%
1946	396,724	−0.15%
1954	435,308	+1.17%
1962	481,289	+1.26%
1968	540,988	+1.97%
1975	606,320	+1.64%
1982	661,781	+1.26%
1990	725,603	+1.16%
1999	766,441	+0.61%
2007	796,624	+0.48%
2012	810,300	+0.34%
2017	824,503	+0.35%
2023	829,899	+0.11%

== Politics ==
The president of the Departmental Council of Oise is Nadège Lefebvre of The Republicans (LR), first elected in 2017.

=== Presidential elections (2nd round) results since 1995 ===
Election	Winning candidate	Party	%	2nd place candidate	Party	%
2022	Marine Le Pen	RN	52.73	Emmanuel Macron	LREM	47.27
2017	Emmanuel Macron	LREM	53.28	Marine Le Pen	FN	46.72
2012	Nicolas Sarkozy	UMP	52.66	François Hollande	PS	47.34
2007	Nicolas Sarkozy	UMP	58.28	Ségolène Royal	PS	41.72
2002	Jacques Chirac	RPR	74.93	Jean-Marie Le Pen	FN	25.07

=== Representation in Paris ===
==== National Assembly ====
Constituency	Member	Party
Oise's 1st	Claire Marais-Beuil	RN
Oise's 2nd	Philippe Ballard	RN
Oise's 3rd	Alexandre Sabatou	RN
Oise's 4th	Véronique Ludmann	HOR
Oise's 5th	Frédéric-Pierre Vos	RN
Oise's 6th	Michel Guiniot	RN
Oise's 7th	David Magnier	RN

==== Senate ====
Senator	Party	Since
Édouard Courtial	LR	2017
Alexandre Ouizille	PS	2023
Olivier Paccaud	DVD	2017
Sylvie Valente-Le Hir	DVD	2023

== Tourism ==
The major tourist attraction of the department is the Parc Astérix theme park, which opened in 1989. Other sites of interest are Beauvais Cathedral, the Château de Pierrefonds, restored by Viollet-le-Duc, and the art collection of the Château de Chantilly within the Musée Condé, which is one of the largest nationally outside Paris.

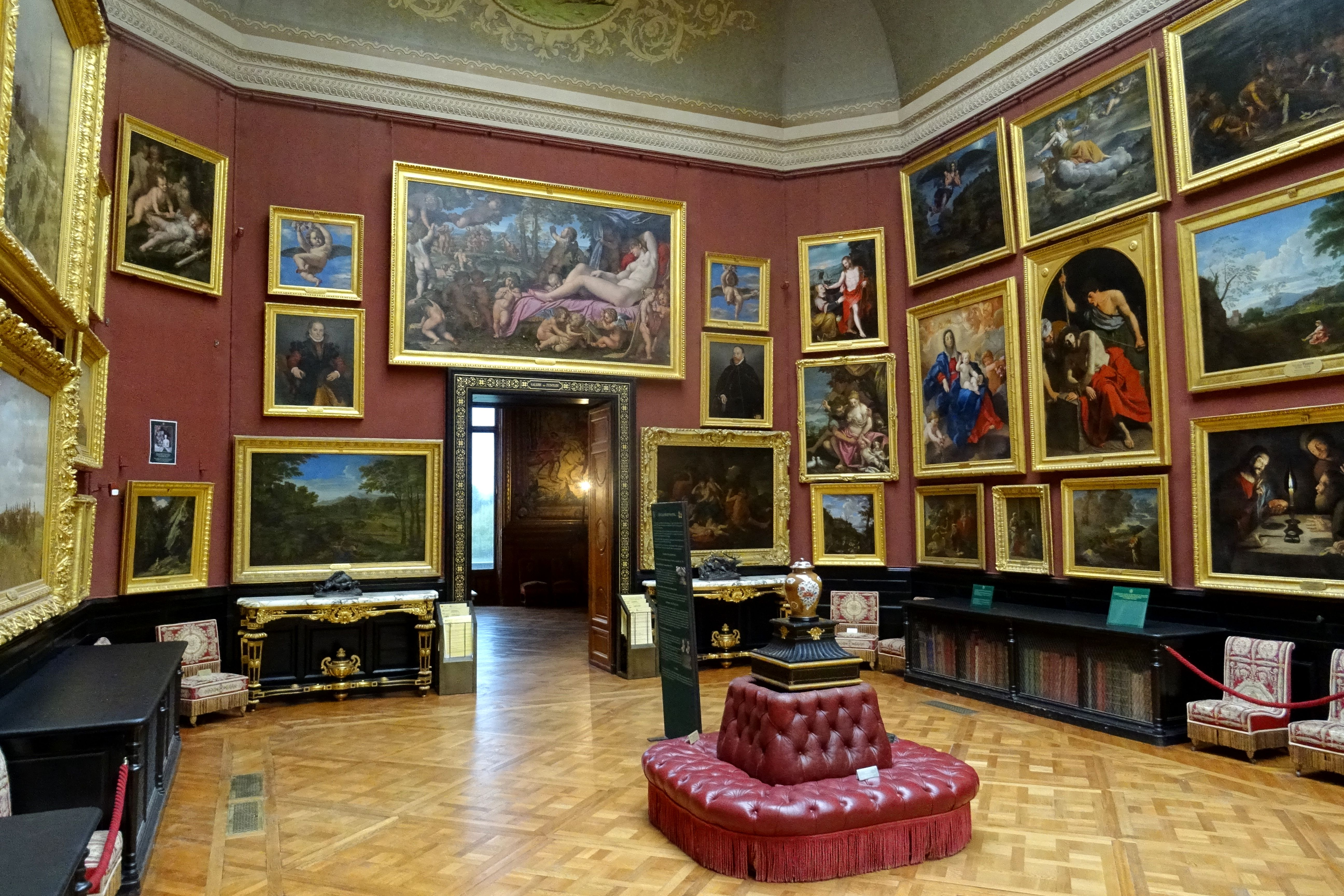
The art gallery in the Château de Chantilly

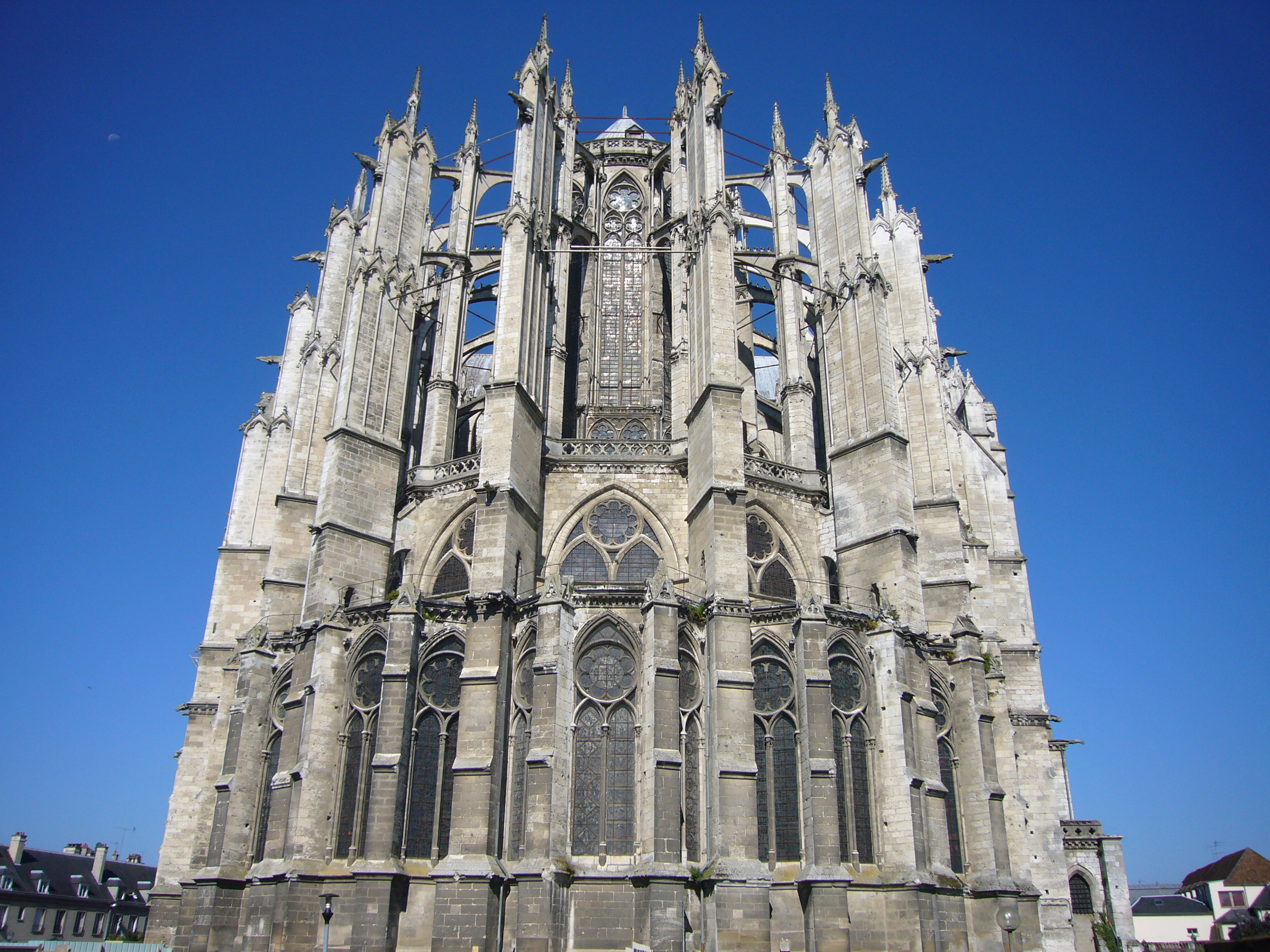
Beauvais Cathedral

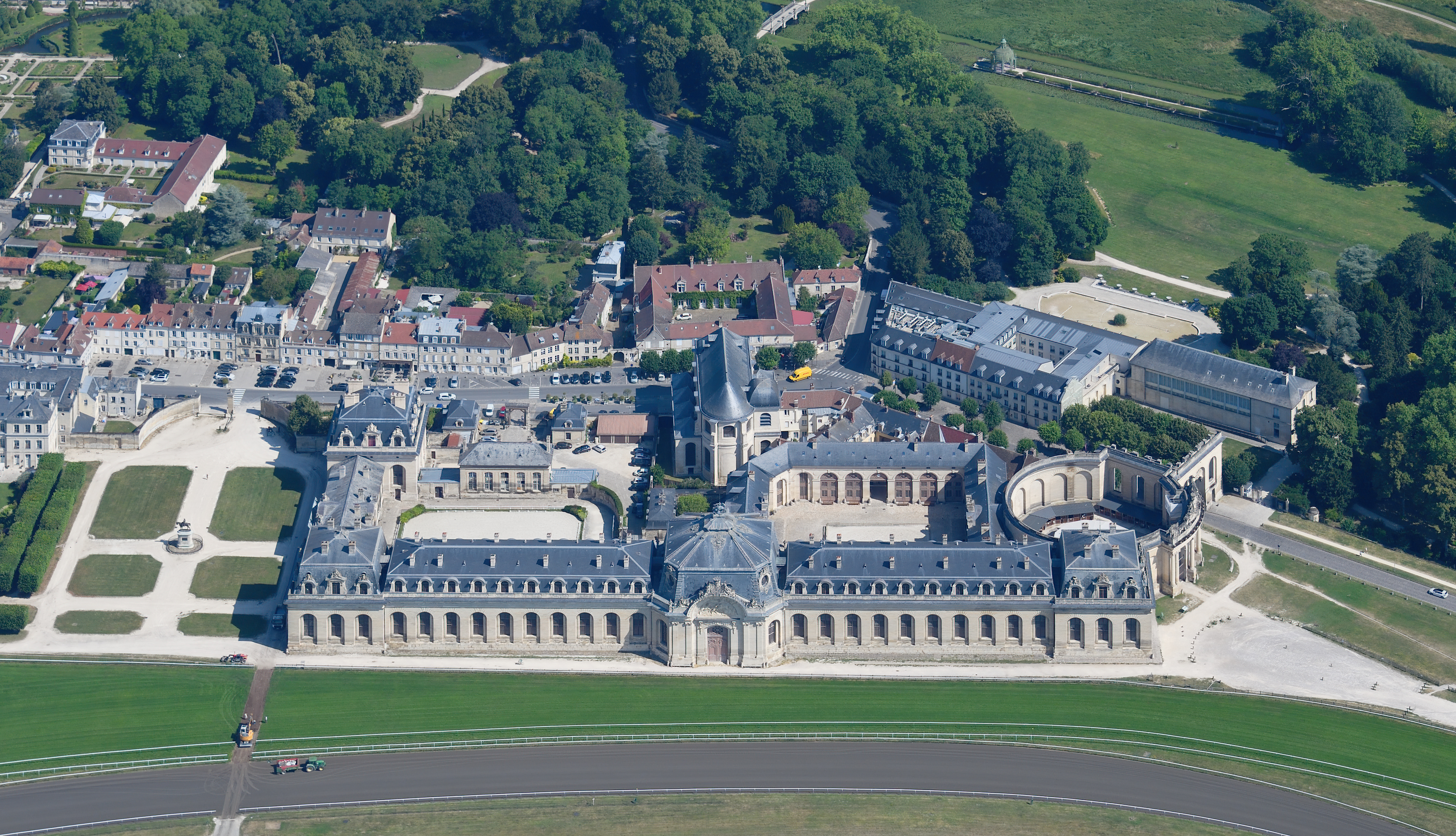
The stables at Chantilly

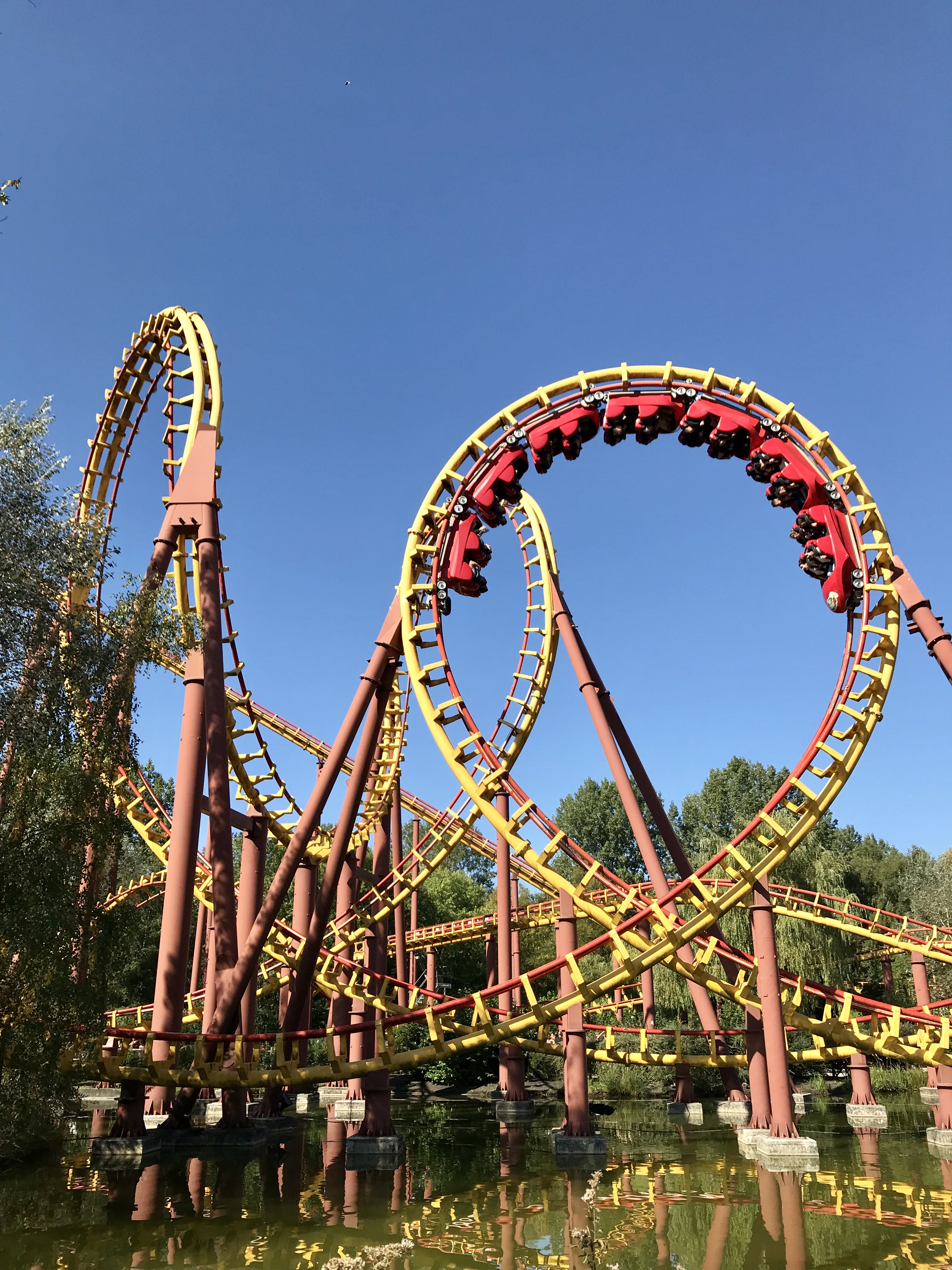
Rollercoaster at Parc Astérix

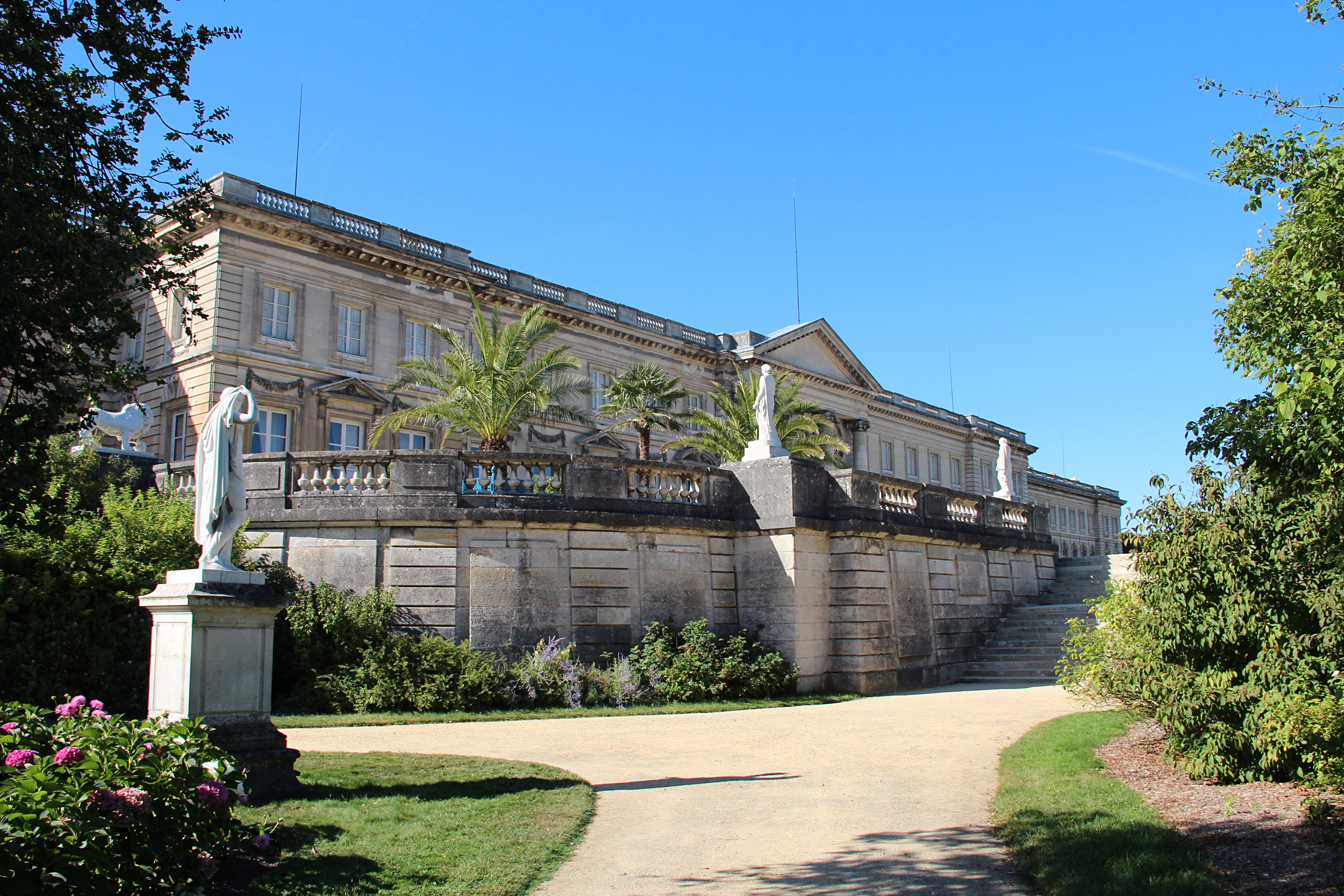
The Château de Compiègne seen from its park

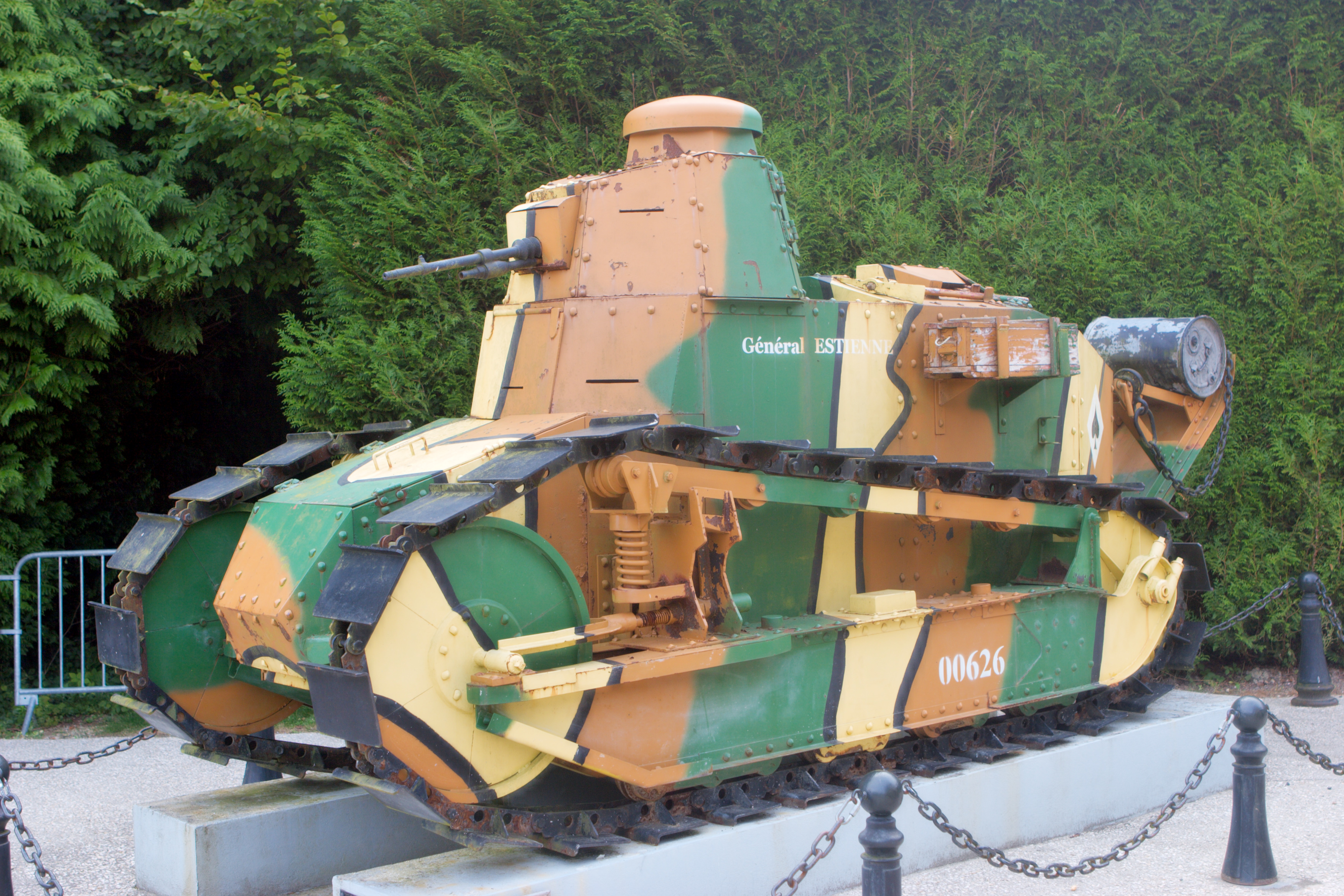
Renault FT in the Glade of the Armistice

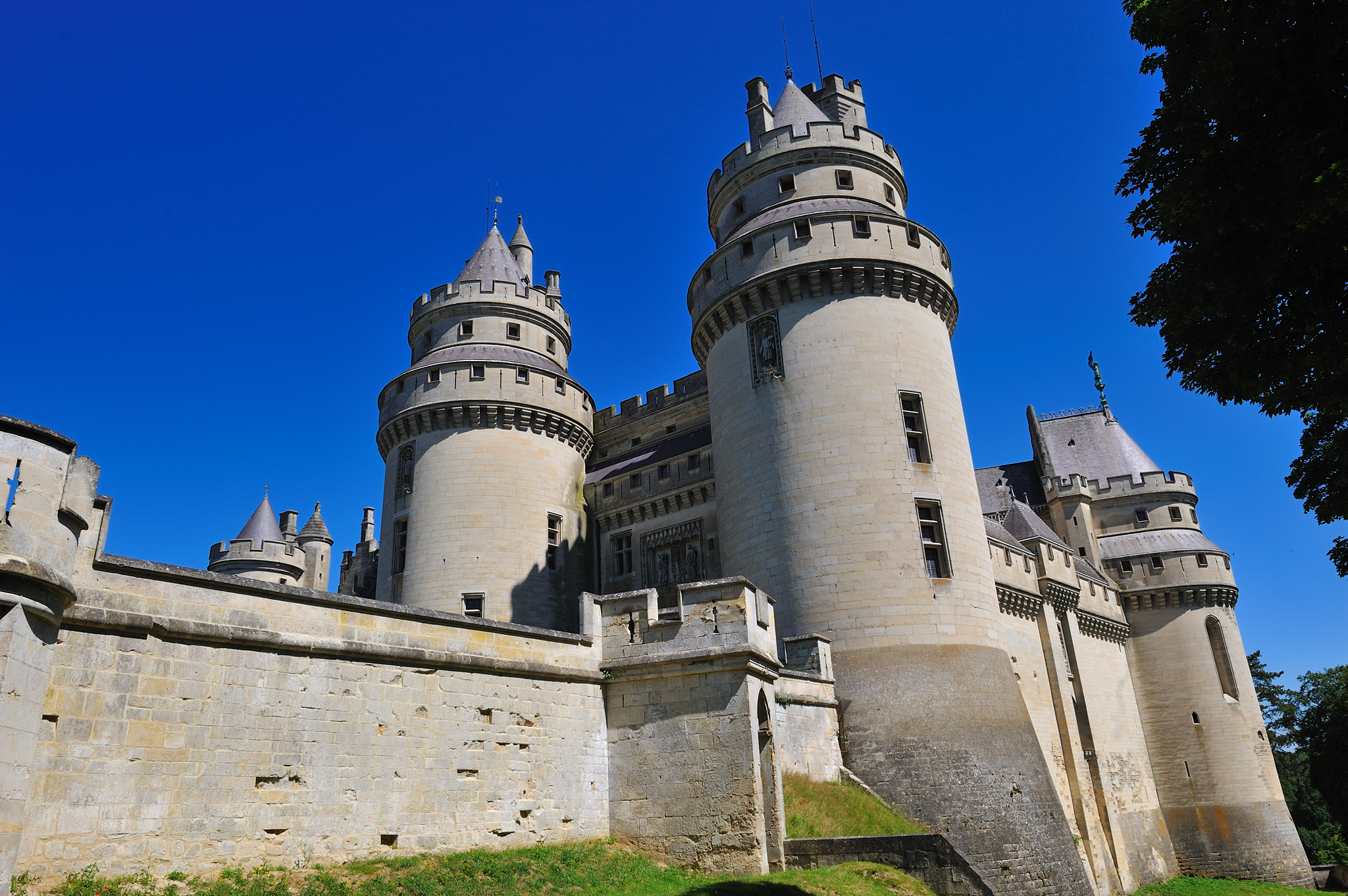
Château de Pierrefonds

== Twinned areas ==
Oise is twinned with Bedfordshire in England. It is also twinned with the Indonesian regency of Karanganyar and the Chinese provinces of Shandong and Zhejiang.

One of the villages along the river Oise is Auvers-sur-Oise, famous for having been visited by several impressionist artists. This is where Vincent van Gogh spent his last 70 days and is his and his brother Theo's resting place.

== See also ==
- Arrondissements of the Oise department
- Cantons of the Oise department
- Communes of the Oise department
- Monument aux morts (Oise)
