= Results of the 2024 French legislative election in Rhône =

Following the first round of the 2024 French legislative election on 30 June 2024, runoff elections in each constituency where no candidate received a vote share greater than 50 percent were scheduled for 7 July. Candidates permitted to stand in the runoff elections needed to either come in first or second place in the first round or achieve more than 12.5 percent of the votes of the entire electorate (as opposed to 12.5 percent of the vote share due to low turnout).

== Rhône ==
=== 1st constituency ===
| Candidate | Party or alliance | | First round | | Second round | |
| Candidate | Party or alliance | | Votes | % | Votes | % |
|---|---|---|---|---|---|---|
| Anaïs Belouassa-Cherifi | New Popular Front | La France Insoumise | 22,045 | 42.62 | 23,970 | 46.60 |
| Thomas Rudigoz | Ensemble | Renaissance | 15,275 | 29.53 | 18,117 | 35.22 |
| Laurent Mouton | National Rally | | 9,361 | 18.10 | 9,351 | 18.18 |
| Grégory Sansoz | The Republicans | | 3,005 | 5.81 | | |
| Anne Thiriat | Ecologists | Independent | 1,165 | 2.25 | | |
| Brandon Alves | Reconquête | | 413 | 0.80 | | |
| Jim Bugni | Far-left | Lutte Ouvrière | 353 | 0.68 | | |
| Guillaume Eymeric | Independent | | 109 | 0.21 | | |
| Ivanka Lopouchansky | Far-left | Independent | 2 | 0.00 | | |
| Total | | | 51,728 | 100.00 | 51,438 | 100.00 |
| Valid votes | | | 51,728 | 98.66 | 51,438 | 98.21 |
| Invalid votes | | | 198 | 0.38 | 233 | 0.44 |
| Blank votes | | | 505 | 0.96 | 702 | 1.34 |
| Total votes | | | 52,431 | 100.00 | 52,373 | 100.00 |
| Registered voters/turnout | | | 71,917 | 72.90 | 71,914 | 72.83 |

=== 2nd constituency ===
| Candidate | Party or alliance | | First round | | Second round | |
| Candidate | Party or alliance | | Votes | % | Votes | % |
|---|---|---|---|---|---|---|
| Boris Tavernier | New Popular Front | The Ecologists | 28,567 | 49.65 | 30,239 | 58.58 |
| Loïc Terrenes | Ensemble | Renaissance | 14,455 | 25.12 | 21,385 | 41.42 |
| Anaëlle Bisleau | National Rally | | 8,228 | 14.30 | | |
| Maryll Guilloteau | The Republicans | | 4,456 | 7.74 | | |
| Karim Mahmoud-Vintam | Independent | | 731 | 1.27 | | |
| Vanessa Etienne | Reconquête | | 456 | 0.79 | | |
| Delphine Briday | Far-left | Lutte Ouvrière | 297 | 0.52 | | |
| Pascal Coulan | Independent | | 148 | 0.26 | | |
| Michaël Jouteux | Far-left | Independent | 133 | 0.23 | | |
| Nizar Touihri | Independent | | 63 | 0.11 | | |
| Anthony Bruno | Far-left | Independent | 0 | 0.00 | | |
| Total | | | 57,534 | 100.00 | 51,624 | 100.00 |
| Valid votes | | | 57,534 | 98.94 | 51,624 | 94.84 |
| Invalid votes | | | 189 | 0.33 | 702 | 1.29 |
| Blank votes | | | 427 | 0.73 | 2,109 | 3.87 |
| Total votes | | | 58,150 | 100.00 | 54,435 | 100.00 |
| Registered voters/turnout | | | 74,611 | 77.94 | 74,623 | 72.95 |

=== 3rd constituency ===
| Candidate | Party or alliance | | Votes | % |
|---|---|---|---|---|
| Marie-Charlotte Garin | New Popular Front | The Ecologists | 27,736 | 51.51 |
| Clara Eynaud-Lassalle | Ensemble | Renaissance | 11,557 | 21.46 |
| Clotilde Morin | National Rally | | 7,938 | 14.74 |
| Béatrice de Montille | The Republicans | | 4,464 | 8.29 |
| Eric Lafond | Ecologists | Independent | 688 | 1.28 |
| Leo Bourret | Union of Democrats and Independents (Note: Dissident who ran without the backing of Ensemble) | | 501 | 0.93 |
| Vanessa Etienne | Reconquête | | 486 | 0.90 |
| Jean-Noël Dudukdjian | Far-left | Lutte Ouvrière | 260 | 0.48 |
| Anaïs Barrallon | Far-left | New Anticapitalist Party (Note: Dissident who ran without the backing of the New Popular Front) | 141 | 0.26 |
| Marc Chinal | Independent | | 71 | 0.13 |
| Total | | | 53,842 | 100.00 |
| Valid votes | | | 53,842 | 98.90 |
| Invalid votes | | | 172 | 0.32 |
| Blank votes | | | 426 | 0.78 |
| Total votes | | | 54,440 | 100.00 |
| Registered voters/turnout | | | 70,822 | 76.87 |

=== 4th constituency ===
| Candidate | Party or alliance | | First round | | Second round | |
| Candidate | Party or alliance | | Votes | % | Votes | % |
|---|---|---|---|---|---|---|
| Sandrine Runel | New Popular Front | Socialist Party | 22,959 | 38.00 | 24,852 | 42.48 |
| Anne Brugnera | Ensemble | Renaissance | 18,744 | 31.02 | 23,208 | 39.67 |
| Yannick Chaumont | National Rally | | 10,818 | 17.91 | 10,449 | 17.86 |
| Romain Billard | The Republicans | | 6,268 | 10.37 | | |
| Armande Torrent | Reconquête | | 655 | 1.08 | | |
| Julien Quevy | Ecologists | Independent | 502 | 0.83 | | |
| Coralie Laurent | Far-left | Lutte Ouvrière | 329 | 0.54 | | |
| Juliette Vel | Independent | | 143 | 0.24 | | |
| Tristan Jego | Far-left | Independent | 0 | 0.00 | | |
| Total | | | 60,418 | 100.00 | 58,509 | 100.00 |
| Valid votes | | | 60,418 | 98.91 | 58,509 | 98.36 |
| Invalid votes | | | 151 | 0.25 | 213 | 0.36 |
| Blank votes | | | 517 | 0.85 | 764 | 1.28 |
| Total votes | | | 61,086 | 100.00 | 59,486 | 100.00 |
| Registered voters/turnout | | | 78,898 | 77.42 | 78,903 | 75.39 |

=== 5th constituency ===
| Candidate | Party or alliance | | First round | | Second round | |
| Candidate | Party or alliance | | Votes | % | Votes | % |
|---|---|---|---|---|---|---|
| Blandine Brocard | Ensemble | Democratic Movement | 21,402 | 32.04 | 29,758 | 45.61 |
| Fabrice Matteucci | New Popular Front | Socialist Party | 17,701 | 26.50 | 16,317 | 25.01 |
| Sasha Bitoum | National Rally | | 16,962 | 25.39 | 19,170 | 29.38 |
| Bastien Joint | The Republicans | | 9,321 | 13.95 | | |
| Mathieu Bazin | Reconquête | | 1,001 | 1.50 | | |
| Hélène Rivière | Far-left | Lutte Ouvrière | 410 | 0.61 | | |
| Total | | | 66,797 | 100.00 | 65,245 | 100.00 |
| Valid votes | | | 66,797 | 98.68 | 65,245 | 98.09 |
| Invalid votes | | | 202 | 0.30 | 236 | 0.35 |
| Blank votes | | | 691 | 1.02 | 1,037 | 1.56 |
| Total votes | | | 67,690 | 100.00 | 66,518 | 100.00 |
| Registered voters/turnout | | | 90,607 | 74.71 | 90,622 | 73.40 |

=== 6th constituency ===
| Candidate | Party or alliance | | First round | | Second round | |
| Candidate | Party or alliance | | Votes | % | Votes | % |
|---|---|---|---|---|---|---|
| Gabriel Amard | New Popular Front | La France Insoumise | 26,876 | 46.16 | 25,352 | 50.57 |
| Jean-Paul Bret | Miscellaneous left | Socialist Party (Note: Dissident who ran without the backing of the New Popular Front) | 11,628 | 19.97 | 24,783 | 49.43 |
| Délia Agus | National Rally | | 11,057 | 18.99 | | |
| Marc Fraysse | The Republicans | | 7,190 | 12.35 | | |
| Joseph Basilien | Ecologists | Independent | 714 | 1.23 | | |
| Nadia Bouhami | Far-left | Lutte Ouvrière | 453 | 0.78 | | |
| Raphaëlle Mizony | Far-left | New Anticapitalist Party (Note: Dissident who ran without the backing of the New Popular Front) | 183 | 0.31 | | |
| Teyi Kekeli Lawson Doute | Independent | | 127 | 0.22 | | |
| Total | | | 58,228 | 100.00 | 50,135 | 100.00 |
| Valid votes | | | 58,228 | 98.32 | 50,135 | 93.14 |
| Invalid votes | | | 234 | 0.40 | 762 | 1.42 |
| Blank votes | | | 758 | 1.28 | 2,930 | 5.44 |
| Total votes | | | 59,220 | 100.00 | 53,827 | 100.00 |
| Registered voters/turnout | | | 92,008 | 64.36 | 92,020 | 58.49 |

=== 7th constituency ===
| Candidate | Party or alliance | | First round | | Second round | |
| Candidate | Party or alliance | | Votes | % | Votes | % |
|---|---|---|---|---|---|---|
| Abdelkader Lahmar | New Popular Front | La France Insoumise | 20,063 | 46.00 | 21,966 | 50.04 |
| Alexandre Vincendet | Ensemble | Horizons | 11,799 | 27.05 | 13,214 | 30.10 |
| Cédric Pignal | National Rally | | 9,280 | 21.28 | 8,721 | 19.87 |
| Myriam Fontaine | The Republicans | | 1,536 | 3.52 | | |
| Thomas Spreux | Far-left | Lutte Ouvrière | 526 | 1.21 | | |
| Régine Benon | Reconquête | | 411 | 0.94 | | |
| Total | | | 43,615 | 100.00 | 43,901 | 100.00 |
| Valid votes | | | 43,615 | 98.25 | 43,901 | 98.51 |
| Invalid votes | | | 248 | 0.56 | 189 | 0.42 |
| Blank votes | | | 527 | 1.19 | 474 | 1.06 |
| Total votes | | | 44,390 | 100.00 | 44,564 | 100.00 |
| Registered voters/turnout | | | 72,607 | 61.14 | 72,634 | 61.35 |

=== 8th constituency ===
| Candidate | Party or alliance | | First round | | Second round | |
| Candidate | Party or alliance | | Votes | % | Votes | % |
|---|---|---|---|---|---|---|
| Jonathan Géry | National Rally | | 25,810 | 33.46 | 29,317 | 37.90 |
| Anne Reymbaut | New Popular Front | Socialist Party | 17,548 | 22.75 | 23,439 | 30.30 |
| Dominique Despras | Ensemble | Democratic Movement | 16,338 | 21.18 | 51 | 0.07 |
| Nathalie Serre | The Republicans | | 15,941 | 20.66 | 24,556 | 31.74 |
| Xavier Fourboul | Reconquête | | 876 | 1.14 | | |
| Tristan Teyssier | Far-left | Lutte Ouvrière | 630 | 0.82 | | |
| Total | | | 77,143 | 100.00 | 77,363 | 100.00 |
| Valid votes | | | 77,143 | 98.13 | 77,363 | 97.78 |
| Invalid votes | | | 362 | 0.46 | 375 | 0.47 |
| Blank votes | | | 1,108 | 1.41 | 1,378 | 1.74 |
| Total votes | | | 78,613 | 100.00 | 79,116 | 100.00 |
| Registered voters/turnout | | | 106,006 | 74.16 | 105,986 | 74.65 |

=== 9th constituency ===
| Candidate | Party or alliance | | First round | | Second round | |
| Candidate | Party or alliance | | Votes | % | Votes | % |
|---|---|---|---|---|---|---|
| Patrick Louis | Union of the far right | The Republicans | 24,466 | 35.41 | 26,836 | 39.63 |
| Alexandre Portier | The Republicans | | 17,554 | 25.40 | 40,872 | 60.37 |
| Jean-Henri Soumireu-Lartigue | New Popular Front | Socialist Party | 16,066 | 23.25 | | |
| Antoine Laurent | Ensemble | Renaissance | 9,935 | 14.38 | | |
| Damien D'autryve | Regionalists | Independent | 613 | 0.89 | | |
| Chantal Helly | Far-left | Lutte Ouvrière | 464 | 0.67 | | |
| Total | | | 69,098 | 100.00 | 67,708 | 100.00 |
| Valid votes | | | 69,098 | 98.23 | 67,708 | 96.79 |
| Invalid votes | | | 272 | 0.39 | 487 | 0.70 |
| Blank votes | | | 973 | 1.38 | 1,755 | 2.51 |
| Total votes | | | 70,343 | 100.00 | 69,950 | 100.00 |
| Registered voters/turnout | | | 98,123 | 71.69 | 98,153 | 71.27 |

=== 10th constituency ===
| Candidate | Party or alliance | | First round | | Second round | |
| Candidate | Party or alliance | | Votes | % | Votes | % |
|---|---|---|---|---|---|---|
| Thomas Gassilloud | Ensemble | Renaissance | 23,964 | 32.54 | 45,099 | 62.93 |
| Cécile Patout | National Rally | | 22,942 | 31.15 | 26,562 | 37.07 |
| Florence Perrin | New Popular Front | Socialist Party | 17,412 | 23.64 | | |
| Sophie Cruz | The Republicans | | 6,689 | 9.08 | | |
| David Hornus | Miscellaneous right | Independent | 1,296 | 1.76 | | |
| Irène Berenyi Geley | Reconquête | | 788 | 1.07 | | |
| Gilles Bompard | Far-left | Lutte Ouvrière | 551 | 0.75 | | |
| Total | | | 73,642 | 100.00 | 71,661 | 100.00 |
| Valid votes | | | 73,642 | 98.28 | 71,661 | 96.20 |
| Invalid votes | | | 288 | 0.38 | 589 | 0.79 |
| Blank votes | | | 998 | 1.33 | 2,245 | 3.01 |
| Total votes | | | 74,928 | 100.00 | 74,495 | 100.00 |
| Registered voters/turnout | | | 99,044 | 75.65 | 99,067 | 75.20 |

=== 11th constituency ===
| Candidate | Party or alliance | | First round | | Second round | |
| Candidate | Party or alliance | | Votes | % | Votes | % |
|---|---|---|---|---|---|---|
| Alexandre Humbert Dupalais | Union of the far right | The Republicans | 25,371 | 36.81 | 29,069 | 43.20 |
| Jean-Luc Fugit | Ensemble | Renaissance | 18,564 | 26.93 | 38,214 | 56.80 |
| Abdel Yousfi | New Popular Front | Communist Party | 15,765 | 22.87 | | |
| Cindy Ferro | The Republicans | | 6,708 | 9.73 | | |
| Sophie Spennato | Ecologists | Independent | 1,974 | 2.86 | | |
| Isabelle Browning | Far-left | Lutte Ouvrière | 550 | 0.80 | | |
| Total | | | 68,932 | 100.00 | 67,283 | 100.00 |
| Valid votes | | | 68,932 | 97.86 | 67,283 | 95.73 |
| Invalid votes | | | 405 | 0.57 | 660 | 0.94 |
| Blank votes | | | 1,100 | 1.56 | 2,343 | 3.33 |
| Total votes | | | 70,437 | 100.00 | 70,286 | 100.00 |
| Registered voters/turnout | | | 98,020 | 71.86 | 98,040 | 71.69 |

=== 12th constituency ===
| Candidate | Party or alliance | | First round | | Second round | |
| Candidate | Party or alliance | | Votes | % | Votes | % |
|---|---|---|---|---|---|---|
| Lucie Gaillot-Durand | New Popular Front | The Ecologists | 18,039 | 30.06 | 19,938 | 33.33 |
| Cyrille Isaac-Sibille | Ensemble | Democratic Movement | 17,333 | 28.88 | 23,200 | 38.79 |
| Clémence Luisier | National Rally | | 14,989 | 24.98 | 16,678 | 27.88 |
| Pascal Charmot | The Republicans | | 8,341 | 13.90 | | |
| Noémie Gallice | Reconquête | | 732 | 1.22 | | |
| Cécile Faurite | Far-left | Lutte Ouvrière | 576 | 0.96 | | |
| Total | | | 60,010 | 100.00 | 59,816 | 100.00 |
| Valid votes | | | 60,010 | 98.62 | 59,816 | 98.19 |
| Invalid votes | | | 229 | 0.38 | 274 | 0.45 |
| Blank votes | | | 608 | 1.00 | 827 | 1.36 |
| Total votes | | | 60,847 | 100.00 | 60,917 | 100.00 |
| Registered voters/turnout | | | 82,747 | 73.53 | 82,772 | 73.60 |

=== 13th constituency ===
| Candidate | Party or alliance | | First round | | Second round | |
| Candidate | Party or alliance | | Votes | % | Votes | % |
|---|---|---|---|---|---|---|
| Tiffany Joncour | National Rally | | 22,417 | 36.35 | 28,872 | 51.87 |
| Victor Prandt | New Popular Front | La France Insoumise | 16,178 | 26.23 | 26,794 | 48.13 |
| Sarah Tanzilli | Ensemble | Renaissance | 14,933 | 24.21 | | |
| Philippe Meunier | The Republicans | | 6,106 | 9.90 | | |
| Didier Barthès | Miscellaneous left | Independent | 799 | 1.30 | | |
| Océane Gigarel | Reconquête | | 610 | 0.99 | | |
| Michel Piot | Far-left | Lutte Ouvrière | 523 | 0.85 | | |
| Patrick Biaut | Miscellaneous right | Independent | 105 | 0.17 | | |
| Total | | | 61,671 | 100.00 | 55,666 | 100.00 |
| Valid votes | | | 61,671 | 98.36 | 55,666 | 89.72 |
| Invalid votes | | | 280 | 0.45 | 1,230 | 1.98 |
| Blank votes | | | 751 | 1.20 | 5,146 | 8.29 |
| Total votes | | | 62,702 | 100.00 | 62,042 | 100.00 |
| Registered voters/turnout | | | 89,801 | 69.82 | 89,820 | 69.07 |

=== 14th constituency ===
| Candidate | Party or alliance | | First round | | Second round | |
| Candidate | Party or alliance | | Votes | % | Votes | % |
|---|---|---|---|---|---|---|
| Idir Boumertit | New Popular Front | La France Insoumise | 21,854 | 48.78 | 26,974 | 65.03 |
| Cédric Mermet | National Rally | | 12,637 | 28.21 | 14,508 | 34.97 |
| Ludovic Almeras | Ensemble | Renaissance | 6,996 | 15.62 | | |
| David Mazzone | The Republicans | | 2,059 | 4.60 | | |
| Olivier Minoux | Far-left | Lutte Ouvrière | 815 | 1.82 | | |
| Blandine Riha | Reconquête | | 437 | 0.98 | | |
| Total | | | 44,798 | 100.00 | 41,482 | 100.00 |
| Valid votes | | | 44,798 | 97.83 | 41,482 | 92.56 |
| Invalid votes | | | 339 | 0.74 | 780 | 1.74 |
| Blank votes | | | 655 | 1.43 | 2,553 | 5.70 |
| Total votes | | | 45,792 | 100.00 | 44,815 | 100.00 |
| Registered voters/turnout | | | 76,572 | 59.80 | 76,602 | 58.50 |
