= Abdelkader Lahmar =

French politician (born 1971)

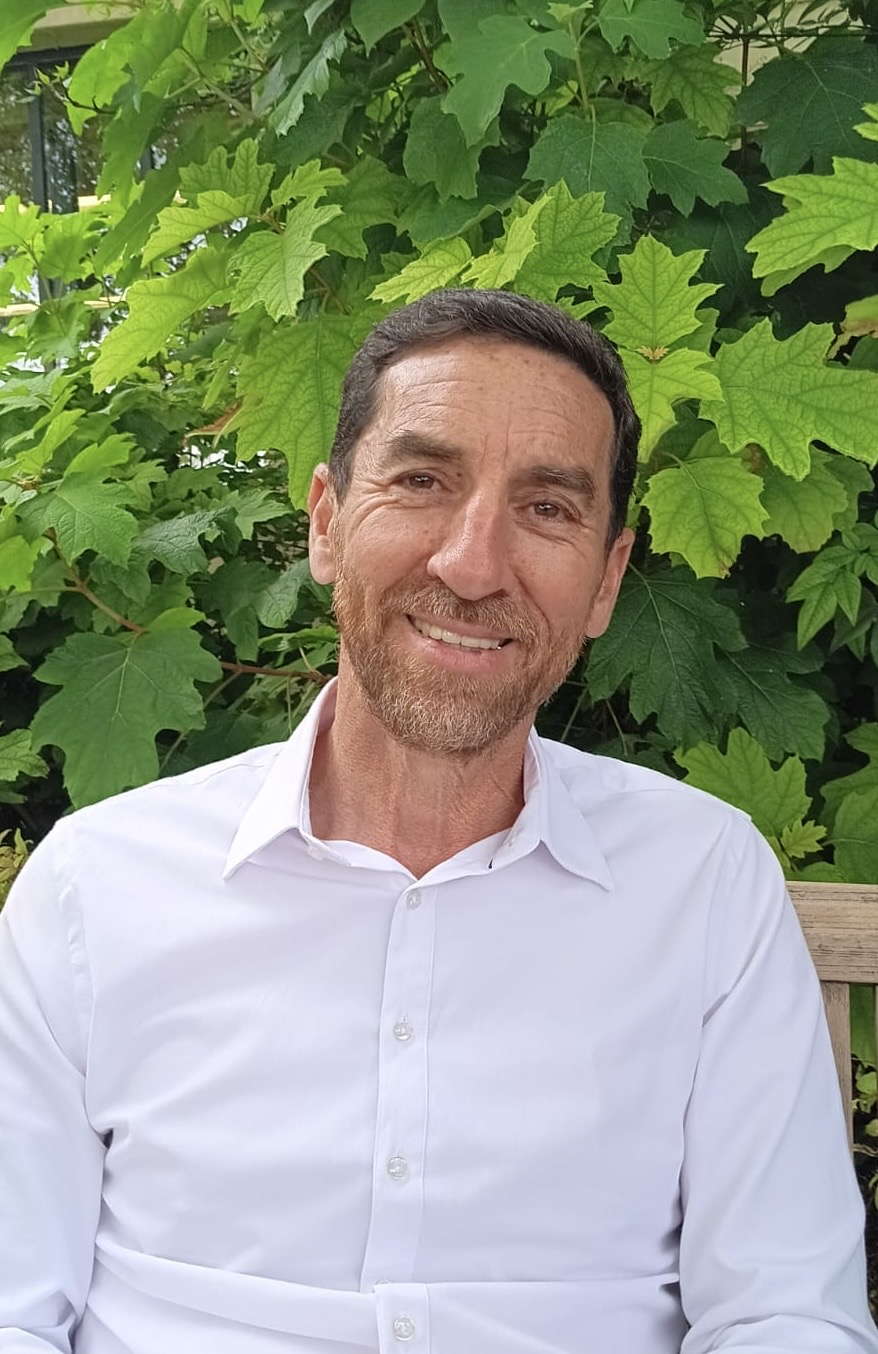
- Abdelkader Lahmar in 2024

Member of the French National Assembly for Rhône's 7th constituency
- Incumbent
- Assumed office 8 July 2024
- Preceded by: Alexandre Vincendet

Personal details
- Born: 12 May 1971 (age 55) Lyon
- Party: La France Insoumise
- Education: Coventry University

Abdelkader Lahmar (born 12 May 1971) is a French politician from La France Insoumise (LFI). In the 2024 French legislative election, he was elected member of the National Assembly for Rhône's 7th constituency.

== Early life and career ==
Abdelkader Lahmar was born on 12 May 1971 in Lyon. The eldest of a family of six children, he is the son of a printing worker and a housewife. He grew up in the working-class district of Mas du Taureau in Vaulx-en-Velin. According to the TSA website, he is Franco-Algerian.

Abdelkader Lahmar holds a University Diploma of Technology (DUT) in marketing techniques. In 1991, he went on an Erasmus exchange at the Coventry Polytechnic Institute in the United Kingdom, where he obtained the equivalent of a master's degree in industrial marketing the following year.

Returning to France in 1994, he prepared for the teaching competition at the University Institute for Teacher Training (IUFM) in Villeurbanne and obtained his Certificate of Aptitude for Secondary Education Teaching (CAPES) in economics and management in 1995. He spent his tenure year at the Sermenaz vocational high school in Rillieux-la-Pape. Between September 1995 until June 2024, he taught economics and management at the Les Canuts vocational high school in his hometown of Vaulx-en-Velin.

== Political career ==
The death of 21-year-old Thomas Claudio, who died after being hit by a police car in his hometown of Vaulx-en-Velin in October 1990, was a trigger for Lahmar's involvement in working-class neighbourhoods. Following this event, which caused major riots, he decided to create an association with other residents of the neighborhood, whose action focused on the fight against academic failure.

In 1995 French municipal elections, he stood in the municipal elections in Lyon on a citizens' list, Le Choix Vaudais, which obtained 7.25% of the votes. In 2019, he co-founded the Mouvement d'initiative vaudais, a collective of residents who wish to give voice to working-class neighbourhoods. During the 2022 French presidential election, he joined the collective On s'en mêle! which organises activists and associations from working-class neighborhoods across France, who called for a vote in favour of Jean-Luc Mélenchon for President of France.

In the 2022 French legislative election, he was the candidate of La France Insoumise and the NUPES alliance for the seat of deputy of the Rhône's 7th constituency. He came first in the first round and lost the second against the candidate, Alexandre Vincendet (LR), who won 53.44% of the votes cast.

On 6 March 2024, he was announced in 26th position (not eligible) on the party list of La France insoumise in the 2024 European Parliament election. On the evening of the European elections on 9 June 2024, and following the announcement of the results, Emmanuel Macron pronounced the dissolution of the National Assembly and thus opens a campaign for new legislative elections, the two rounds of which took place on 30 June and 7 July 2024.

Abdelkader Lahmar stood for a second time in the legislative elections in Rhône's 7th constituency (which covers the communes of Bron, Rillieux-la-Pape, Sathonay-Camp, Sathonay-Village and Vaulx-en-Velin) as a candidate for La France insoumise and the New Popular Front (NFP) alliance. He again came first in the first round and qualified for the second round, in a three-way race. He beat the outgoing deputy and former mayor of Rillieux-la-Pape, Alexandre Vincendet (Horizons) as well as the RN candidate, with 50.04% of the vote and nearly 22,000 votes, and thus became a deputy for the 17th legislature of the French Fifth Republic.

== Election results ==
=== Legislative elections ===
Year	Party	Alliance	Constituency	1st ^{round}			2nd ^{round}			Issue
Year	Party	Alliance	Constituency	Votes	%	Rank	Votes	%	Rank	Issue
2022	LFI	NUPES	Rhône's 7th constituency	8,476	30.99	1st	12,894	46.56	2nd	Beaten
2024	LFI	New Popular Front	Rhône's 7th constituency	20,062	46.00	1st	21,966	50.04	1st	Elected

== See also ==
- List of deputies of the 17th National Assembly of France
