= Hubert Julien-Laferrière =

French politician

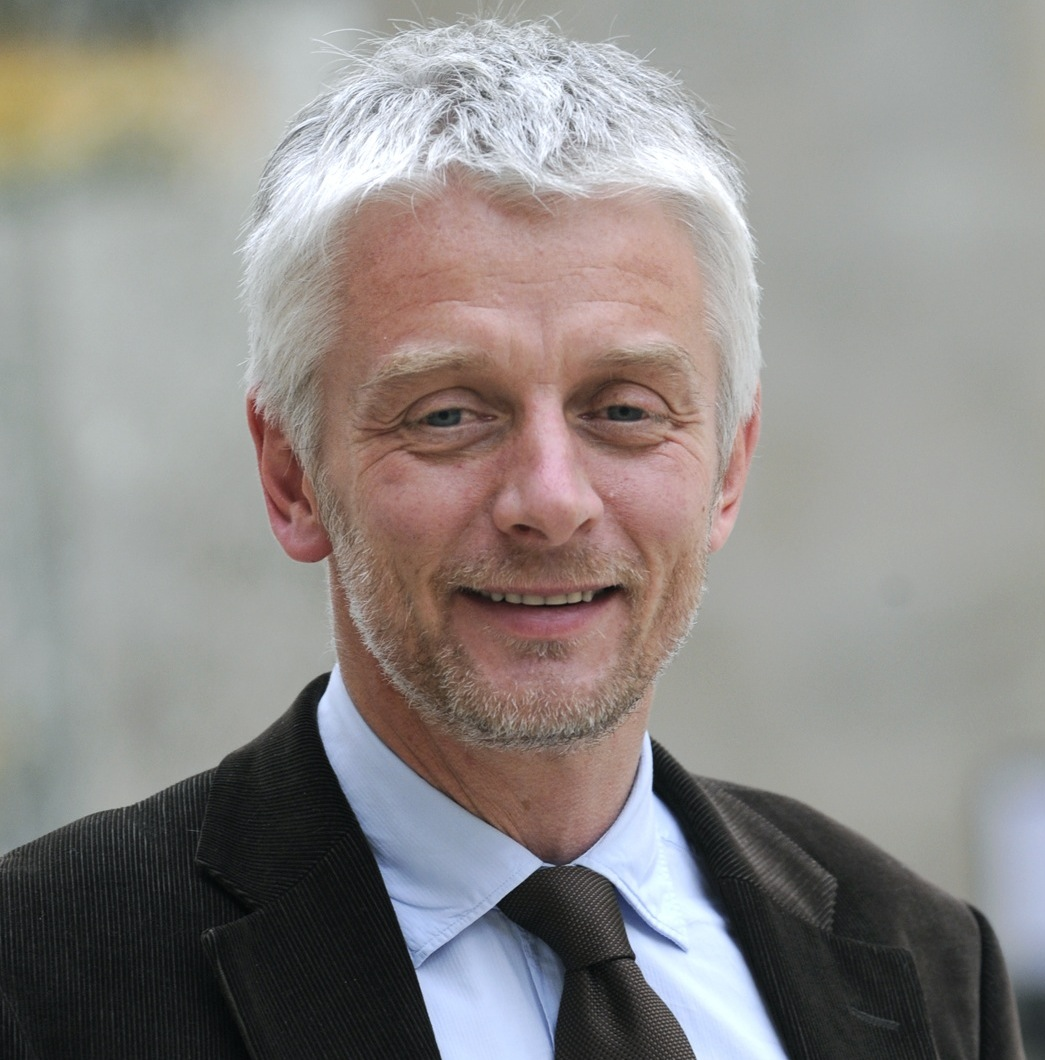
- Hubert Julien-Laferrière in 2012

Member of the National Assembly for Rhône's 2nd constituency
- In office 21 June 2017 – 9 June 2024
- Preceded by: Pierre-Alain Muet
- Succeeded by: Boris Tavernier

Mayor of the 9th arrondissement of Lyon
- In office 12 April 2014 – 21 July 2017
- Preceded by: Alain Giordano
- Succeeded by: Bernard Bochard
- In office 21 July 2003 – 29 March 2008
- Preceded by: Pierrette Augier
- Succeeded by: Alain Giordano

Personal details
- Born: 27 February 1966 (age 59) Boulogne-Billancourt, France
- Party: Socialist Party (1980–2017); La République En Marche! (2017–2020); Génération écologie (2021 onwards)
- Occupation: Economist

Hubert Julien-Laferrière (born 27 February 1966) is a French economist and politician. As member of La République En Marche! (REM), he was elected to the National Assembly on 18 June 2017, representing the department of Rhône. He was then re-elected on 19 June 2022, this time with the left-wing union NUPES and is a member of the Ecologist Group.

Julien-Laferrière previously served twice as Mayor of the 9th arrondissement of Lyon, from 2003 to 2008 and from 2014 until 2017, as a member of the Socialist Party, which he left to run for Parliament as the REM nominee in the department's 2nd constituency. In May 2020 he left REM to join the new Ecology Democracy Solidarity group. In June 2022 he was re-elected as an ecologist member of the New Ecological and Social People's Union.

== Political career ==
Having previously been affiliated with the Socialist Party, Julien-Laferrière joined LREM in 2017.

In parliament, Julien-Laferrière serves on the Committee on Foreign Affairs. In this capacity, he is the parliament’s rapporteur for the official development assistance (ODA) budget.

In addition to his committee assignments, Julien-Laferrière is a member of the French delegation to the Inter-Parliamentary Union (IPU) and the parliamentary friendship groups with Suriname, Kenya, Uganda, Tanzania, Burundi, Rwanda, among others.

In light of the 2019–20 French pension reform strike, Julien-Laferrière called for compromise between trade unions and the government. In March 2020, he left LREM after Prime Minister Edouard Philippe announced he would push through the bill by executive decree.

In May 2020, Julie-Laferrière was one of the 17 initial members of the new Ecology Democracy Solidarity group in the National Assembly. By June, he and five other ex-LREM deputies announced the establishment of #Nous Demain, a "humanist, ecologist and feminist" political movement.

Also in 2020, Julien-Laferrière joined Sylvie Guillaume, Mounir Satouri and Frédérique Dumas in visiting several refugee camps in northern Syria that hold individuals displaced from the Islamic State of Iraq and the Levant, including al-Hawl and Roj.

== Political positions ==
In July 2019, Julien-Laferrière voted in favor of the French ratification of the European Union’s Comprehensive Economic and Trade Agreement (CETA) with Canada.

Ahead of the Green movement's primaries in 2021, Julien-Laferrière endorsed Delphine Batho as the movement's candidate for the French presidential election in 2022.

== See also ==
- List of deputies of the 15th National Assembly of France
- List of deputies of the 16th National Assembly of France
