= Alexandre Vincendet =

French politician

Member of the National Assembly for Rhône's 7th constituency
- In office 22 June 2022 – 9 June 2024
- Preceded by: Anissa Khedher
- Succeeded by: Abdelkader Lahmar

Personal details
- Born: 6 October 1983 (age 42) Ambérieu-en-Bugey, Ain, France
- Other political affiliations: UMP (2004 to 2015); The Republicans (2015-2024)
- Education: Institut supérieur du management public et politique

Alexandre Vincendet (born 6 October 1983 in Ambérieu-en-Bugey) is a French politician.

A member of The Republicans, he was elected Member of Parliament for Rhône's 7th constituency in the 2022 French legislative election.

He was mayor of Rillieux-la-Pape from 2014 to 2022 and since 2024. He has also been a councilor for the Lyon Metropolis from 2015 to 2023.

== Biography ==
=== Early life and education ===
Vincendet was born in Ambérieu-en-Bugey in Ain.

He studied law and political science and graduated in strategies and public and political decisions from the Higher Institute of Public and Political Management (ISMaPP Paris).

=== Political career ===
Vincendet became engaged in political life in 2004 with Étienne Blanc the MP and mayor of Divonne-les-Bains, he began his political career as an activist in Ain and took part in several electoral campaigns with elected officials of national and regional rank, including Jean-François Copé, deputy-mayor of Meaux as project manager in the direction of the federations, then responsible for membership at the national level of the UMP. In 2013, he joined Philippe Cochet, deputy mayor of Caluire-et-Cuire with whom he worked for more than a year as project manager. In particular, he coordinates the events of the year of the commemoration of French Resistance hero Jean Moulin.

=== Mayor of Rillieux-la-Pape ===
On March 30, 2014, seven months after his inauguration as mayor, the electoral list he led won the municipal elections in Rillieux-la-Pape with 48.78% of the votes. He was elected mayor by the municipal council the following April 5. He was also elected to the Metropolitan Council of Lyon where he sat as a member of the finance, institutions, resources and territorial organization commission. He was re-elected to these two positions in 2020.

After his election as a Member of Parliament he resigned from his position as mayor to comply with the law on the accumulation of mandates: Julien Smati succeeded him. Remaining municipal councillor and metropolitan councillor, he nevertheless remains very influential in the actions and communications of the municipality, presents himself as "president of the municipal majority" and sits to the right of the current mayor within the municipal council, a place usually reserved for deputies. He also openly deplores the impossibility of being deputy mayor, in force since 2017.

=== MP for Rhône ===
On 14 June 2016, he was nominated by Les Républicains candidate for Rhône's 7th constituency in the 2017 French legislative election which covers the communes of Bron, Rillieux-la-Pape, Sathonay-Camp, Sathonay-Village et Vaulx-en-Velin. He failed in the second round against LREM candidate Anissa Khedher.

In the 2022 French legislative election, Alexandre Vincendet was elected MP for the Rhône's 7th constituency winning 53.44% of the votes in the second round against NUPES candidate Abdelkader Lahmar. During the campaign, he received the support of Édouard Philippe and Gérald Darmanin. The incumbent LREM MP Anissa Khedher was eliminated in the first round

He hired Jérôme Lavrilleux (sentenced to 2 years in the Bygmalion affair), Daphné Moly Cappo (collaborator at the town hall of Rillieux-La-Pape) and Charles Perrut (son of the former deputy Bernard Perrut) as collaborators parliamentarians.

Politically close to Jean-François Copé, he supports an alliance between LREM and Les Republicans.

At the start of the legislature, he defended pension reform and supported the controversial Turin–Lyon high-speed railway.

=== Court cases ===
On 18 November 2020, Alexandre Vincendet was convicted by the Lyon criminal court for having committed acts of violence against a minor on 6 March 2020, without incapacity, by an ascendant; in this case his son then aged 4 years old. This conviction was not recorded in the criminal record of the person concerned, who subsequently followed a parental responsibility course.

In October 2021, a complaint against Alexandre Vincendet for violence against a 15-year-old minor by a person with authority, in this case his son then aged 5, was dismissed, insufficiently characterized.

In March 2023, the Lyon public prosecutor's office opened an investigation for illegal taking of interest and embezzlement targeting Alexandre Vincendet in question a free shuttle for the private establishment Saint-Charles de Rillieux-la-Pape set up in 2021.

== Published works ==
He is the author of a book Ce n'est qu'une question de courage released by Ramsay in 2022.

The action of Alexandre Vincendet at the town hall of Rillieux-la-Pape is the subject of a chapter in Erwan Seznec's book, Our elected officials and Islam, published by Robert Laffont in 2020 as well as a work entitled Les territoires gagnés de la République, written by Arnaud Lacheret and released by Le bord de l'eau in 2019.
