= Rhône's 2nd constituency =

Constituency of the National Assembly of France

2nd constituency of Rhône
- inline Constituency of the National Assembly of France

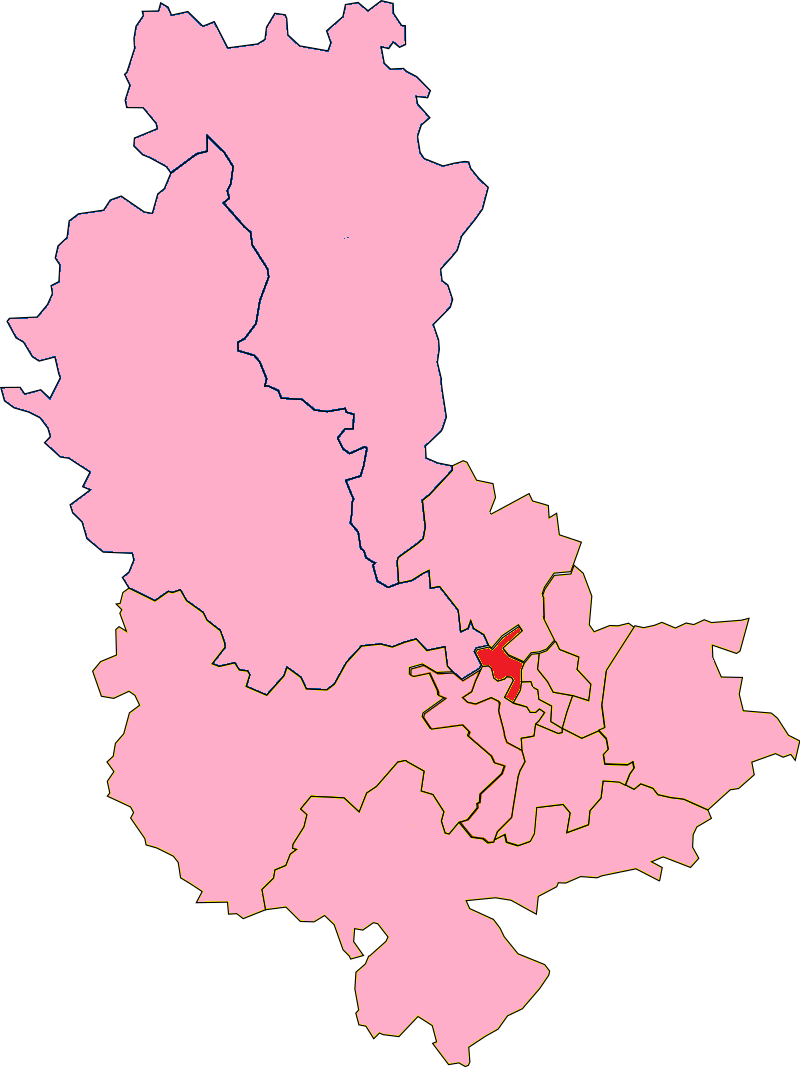
- Rhône's's 2nd Constituency shown within Rhône
- Deputy: Boris Tavernier; LÉ–EELV
- Department: Rhône
- Cantons: Lyon I [part], Lyon II, Lyon III, Lyon IV [part]
- Registered voters: 74987

The 2nd constituency of the Rhône (French: Deuxième circonscription du Rhône) is a French legislative constituency in the Rhône département. Like the other 576 French constituencies, it elects one MP using a two round electoral system.

== Description ==
The 2nd constituency of the Rhône includes parts of Lyon, including those immediately to the north of the city centre. It is an urban seat in France's second largest city. Since 2015 this constituency has been part of the Lyon Metropolis and therefore outside of the Rhône for administrative purposes.

Politically the seat swung towards the left in the first decade of the 21st Century, with the Socialist Party winning the seat for the first time in its current form, after many years of centre right control. The constituency opted for En Marche! in 2017 elections reflecting the large surge of support for Emmanuel Macron across the Rhône. In 2020, the deputy, Hubert Julien-Laferrière was one of the 17 initial members of the Ecology Democracy Solidarity group which broke away from En Marche!.

== Assembly Members ==
Election	Member	Party
1988	Michel Noir	RPR
1993	Michel Noir	DVD
1997	Henry Chabert	RPR
2002	Emmanuel Hamelin	UMP
2007	Pierre-Alain Muet	PS
2012	Pierre-Alain Muet	PS
2017	Hubert Julien-Laferrière	LREM
2020	Hubert Julien-Laferrière	EDS
2022	Hubert Julien-Laferrière	GE
2024	Boris Tavernier	LÉ–EELV

== Election results ==
=== 2024 ===
Legislative Election 2024: Rhône's 2nd constituency
Party	Candidate	Votes	%	±%
LÉ–EELV (NFP)	Boris Tavernier	28,567	49.65	+14.83
RE (Ensemble)	Loïc Terrenes	14,455	25,12	-3.60
RN	Anaëlle Bisleau	8,228	14.30	+8.83
LR	Maryll Guilloteau	4,456	7.74	+2.19
DIV	Karim Mahmoud-Vintam	731	1.27	
REC	Vanessa Etenne	456	0.79	−4.78
LO	Delphine Briday	297	0.52	N/A
DIV	Michaël Jouteux	133	0.23	N/A
DIV	Nizar Touihri	63	0.11	N/A
DIV	Anthony Bruno	0	0	
Turnout		57,534	98.94	+17.39
Registered electors		74,611		
2nd round result
LÉ–EELV	Boris Tavernier	30,239	58.58	+8.93
RE	Loïc Terrenes	21,385	41.42	+16.1
Turnout		51624	94.84	−0.86
Registered electors		74,623		
LÉ–EELV hold		Swing		

=== 2022 ===
Legislative Election 2022: Rhone's 2nd constituency
Party	Candidate	Votes	%	±%
GE (NUPÉS)	Hubert Julien-Laferriere*	15,232	34.82	+18.87
LREM (Ensemble)	Loic Terrenes	12,562	28.72	-10.40
LR (UDC)	Myriam Fogel-Jedidi	4,077	9.32	−7.57
NPA	Raphaël Arnault	2,980	6.81	N/A
REC	Pierre Simon	2,438	5.57	N/A
RN	Sylvine Sintès	2,392	5.47	N/A
PS	Philippe Prieto**	1,309	2.99	N/A
FGR	Adrien Drioli	1,058	2.52	1,691
Others	N/A	1,691	-	−
Turnout		43,739	59.72	+4.57
2nd round result
GE (NUPÉS)	Hubert Julien-Laferriere*	20,847	51.64	N/A
LREM (Ensemble)	Loic Terrenes	19,524	48.36	−4.45
Turnout		40,371	56.94	+14.36
GE gain from LREM				

* Julien-Laferriere ran for LREM at the previous election. Swings are calculated by alliances and the parties within them.

** Prieto stood as a dissident member of PS, without the support of the party or the NUPES alliance.

=== 2017 ===
Legislative Election 2017: Rhône's 2nd constituency
Party	Candidate	Votes	%	±%
LREM	Hubert Julien-Laferrière	16,177	39.12	
DVG	Nathalie Perrin-Gilbert	7,461	18.04	
LFI	Eleni Ferlet	4,739	11.46	
LR	Laurence Balas	3,512	8.49	
UDI	Denis Broliquier	3,475	8.40	
EELV	Rémi Zinck	1,856	4.49	
FN	David Tabellion	1,760	4.26	
Others	N/A	2,373		
Turnout		41,353	55.15	
2nd round result
LREM	Hubert Julien-Laferrière	16,864	52.81	
DVG	Nathalie Perrin-Gilbert	15,067	47.19	
Turnout		31,931	42.58	
LREM gain from PS				

=== 2012 ===
Legislative Election 2012: Rhône's 2nd constituency
Party	Candidate	Votes	%	±%
PS	Pierre-Alain Muet	16,098	37.15	
UMP	Emmanuel Hamelin	11,020	25.43	
EELV	Emeline Baume	3,825	8.83	
FG	Anne Charmasson-Creus	3,604	8.32	
DVD	Denis Broliquier	3,066	7.07	
FN	Blanche Chaussat	2,922	6.74	
PRV	Febienne Levy	1,109	2.56	
Others	N/A	1,693		
Turnout		43,337	57.87	
2nd round result
PS	Pierre-Alain Muet	23,517	58.15	
UMP	Emmanuel Hamelin	16,924	41.85	
Turnout		40,441	54.00	
PS hold				

=== 2007 ===
Legislative Election 2007: Rhône's 2nd constituency
Party	Candidate	Votes	%	±%
UMP	Emmanuel Hamelin	18,255	41.66	
PS	Pierre-Alain Muet	12,548	28.64	
MoDem	Jean-Loup Fleuret	4,288	9.79	
LV	Ghislaine Gouzou-Testud	1,988	4.54	
Far left	Hicham Jabar	1,327	3.03	
FN	Delphine de Reinach	1,305	2.98	
PCF	Louis Leveque	1,218	2.78	
Others	N/A	2,886		
Turnout		44,099	61.52	
2nd round result
PS	Pierre-Alain Muet	21,310	51.51	
UMP	Emmanuel Hamelin	20,058	48.49	
Turnout		42,136	58.78	
PS gain from UMP				

=== 2002 ===
Legislative Election 2002: Rhône's 2nd constituency
Party	Candidate	Votes	%	±%
UMP	Emmanuel Hamelin	15,487	36.23	
LV	Gilles Buna	13,695	32.04	
DVD	Amaury Nardone	3,899	9.12	
FN	Albert Rosset	3,743	8.76	
LCR	Marylene Cahouet	1,106	2.59	
DVD	Paul Trouillas	1,034	2.42	
Others	N/A	3,786		
Turnout		43,218	68.72	
2nd round result
UMP	Emmanuel Hamelin	20,866	55.36	
LV	Gilles Buna	16,825	44.64	
Turnout		38,718	61.56	
UMP hold				

=== 1997 ===
Legislative Election 1997: Rhône's 2nd constituency
Party	Candidate	Votes	%	±%
LV	Gilles Buna	10,113	26.43	
RPR	Henry Chabert*	7,709	20.15	
RPR	Marc Fraysse	7,217	18.86	
FN	Anne Richard	5,734	14.98	
PCF	Fréderic Gaffiot	1,750	4.57	
LO	Arlette Couzon	1,235	3.23	
DVD	Jeanne d'Anglejean	1,109	2.90	
Others	N/A	3,398		
Turnout		39,413	64.08	
2nd round result
RPR	Henry Chabert	22,090	54.86	
LV	Gilles Buna	18,173	45.14	
Turnout		42,020	68.32	
RPR gain from DVD				

* RPR dissident
