= Anissa Khedher =

French politician

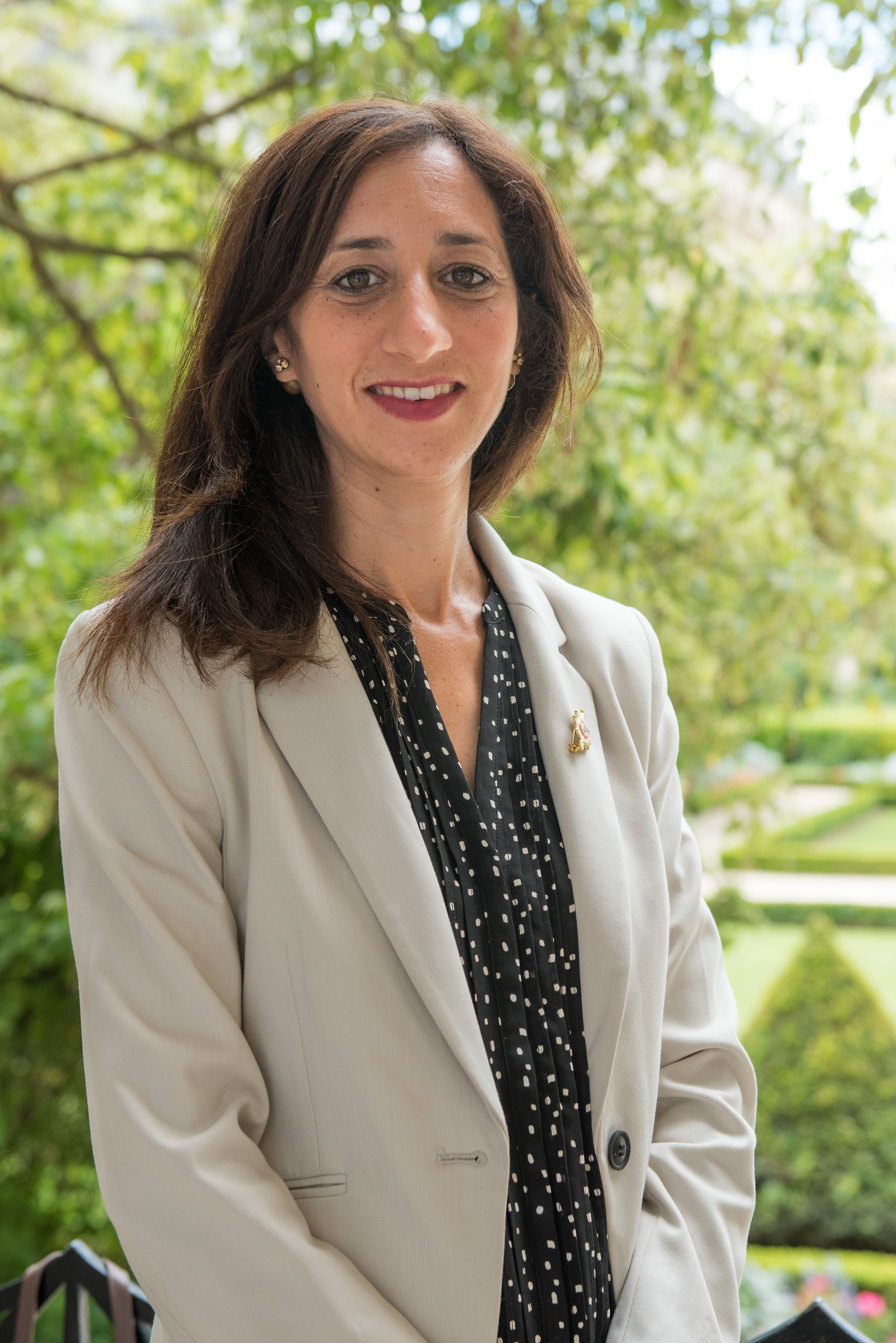
- Anissa Khedher in June 2017

Member of the National Assembly for Rhône's 7th constituency
- In office 21 June 2017 – 21 June 2022
- Preceded by: Hélène Geoffroy
- Succeeded by: Alexandre Vincendet

Personal details
- Born: 1 April 1980 (age 46) Vénissieux, France
- Party: La République En Marche!

Anissa Khedher (born 1 April 1980) is a French politician of La République En Marche! (LREM) who served as a member of the French National Assembly from 2017 to 2022, representing the department of Rhône.

== Political career ==
In parliament, Khedher served as member of the Committee on National Defence and the Armed Forces. In addition to her committee assignments, she was part of the Assembly's delegation to the NATO Parliamentary Assembly. She is also a member of the parliamentary friendship groups with Oman and Tunisia. In 2020, Khedher joined En commun (EC), a group within LREM led by Barbara Pompili.

Khedher lost her seat in the first round of the 2022 French legislative election. The constituency was won by Republican Alexandre Vincendet in the second round.

== Political positions ==
In July 2019, Khedher decided not to align with her parliamentary group's majority and became one of 52 LREM members who abstained from a vote on the French ratification of the European Union’s Comprehensive Economic and Trade Agreement (CETA) with Canada.

== See also ==
- 2017 French legislative election
