= Boris Tavernier =

French activist and politician (born 1979)

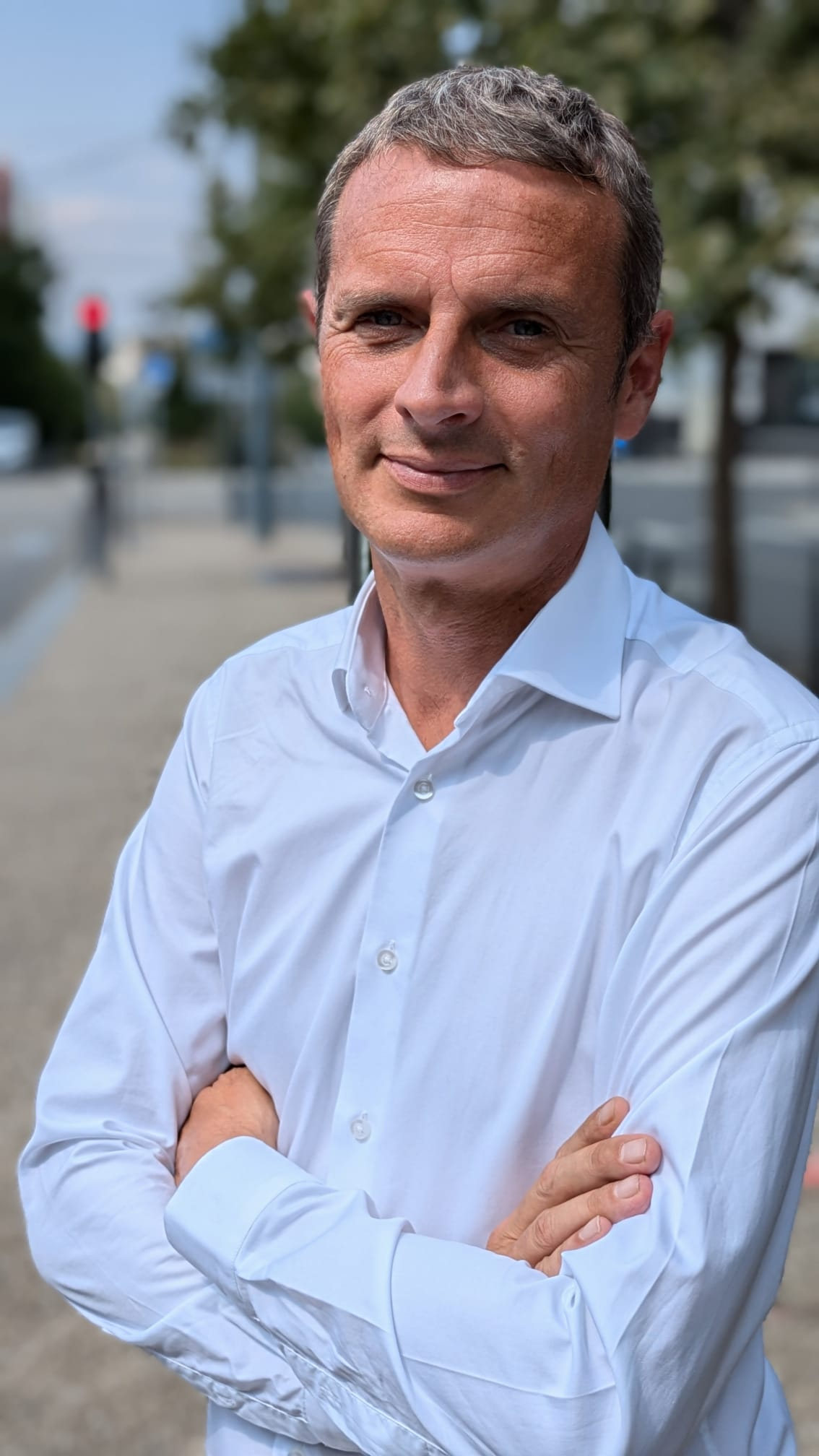
- Tavernier in 2024

Member of the National Assembly for Rhône's 2nd constituency
- Incumbent
- Assumed office 8 July 2024
- Preceded by: Hubert Julien-Laferrière

Personal details
- Born: 23 August 1979 (age 46) Doullens, France
- Party: The Ecologists

Boris Tavernier (French pronunciation: [bɔʁis tavɛʁnje]; born 23 August 1979) is a French activist and politician. A member of The Ecologists, he is a co-founder of the VRAC association (Vers un réseau d'achat en commun; "Towards a Joint Purchasing Network") which fights food insecurity. He was elected a deputy of the National Assembly in the 2024 legislative election in the 2nd constituency of Rhône.

== Biography ==
=== Professional and associative career ===
Coming from a working-class family in Nord-Pas-de-Calais, Tavernier has lived in Lyon since the early 2000s. He is involved in the social and solidarity economy and food. In 2004, he co-founded "De l'autre côté du pont", a bar-restaurant and performance hall in Scop, where he is in charge of the kitchen and cultural programming.

He is the holder of a Master's degree in social and solidarity economy from the University of Lyon 2. In 2013 he co-founded with Marc Uhry and Cédric Van Styvendael VRAC (Towards a Joint Purchasing Network), an association fighting against food insecurity, whose first purchasing group was created in the Lyon neighbourhood of La Duchère. The mission of the association is to allow residents of working-class neighbourhoods with limited incomes to access a chosen and unconstrained food supply, thanks to the sale of products at differentiated pricing. The VRAC association is authorised to provide food aid and is present in several dozen cities in France.

With this association, he organises cooking competitions in various neighbourhoods, several educational projects around food, and initiated and supervised the project "Women from here, Cuisine from elsewhere", a book of investigation and stories on the cooking of women from immigrant backgrounds, published by Albin Michel and written by Alexis Jenni, winner of the 2011 Goncourt Prize. In 2019, he initiated and coordinated the project "Remains of Childhood", a collection of culinary-literary texts. In 2021, he directed the project "Together for better food", co-written by Alexis Jenni and Frédéric Denhez, an investigation into solidarity and sustainable projects to escape food insecurity. The same year, Tavernier became an Ashoka fellow, a title that recognises pioneers of social entrepreneurship.

His expertise in the fight against food insecurity allows him to participate in the work of the National Coordination Committee for the Fight Against Food Insecurity (Cocolupa) and in that of the National Food Programme (PNA). He also appears on France Inter to raise awareness of food issues, notably in the programs "On va déguster" and "La Terre au carré".

He advocates for healthier, fairer and more sustainable food, and for the generalization of social security systems for food social security.

=== Political career ===
The Ecologists party presented him as a candidate in the legislative election of June and July 2024 in Rhône's 2nd constituency. He was elected with 58.5% of the second-round vote and succeeded outgoing deputy Hubert Julien-Laferrière, who did not run for a third term in office. He sits within the Ecologist Group in the National Assembly.

== Election results ==
Election	Party	Constituency	1st ^{round}			2nd ^{round}			Issue
Election	Party	Constituency	Votes	%	Rank	Votes	%	Rank	Issue
2024	LÉ (NFP)	Rhône's 2nd	28,567	49.65	1st	30,239	58.58	1st	Elected

== Mandates ==
- 8 July 2024 – present: deputy for the 2nd constituency of Rhône

== See also ==
- List of deputies of the 17th National Assembly of France
