= Rhône's 13th constituency =

Constituency of the National Assembly of France

13th constituency of Rhône
- inline Constituency of the National Assembly of France

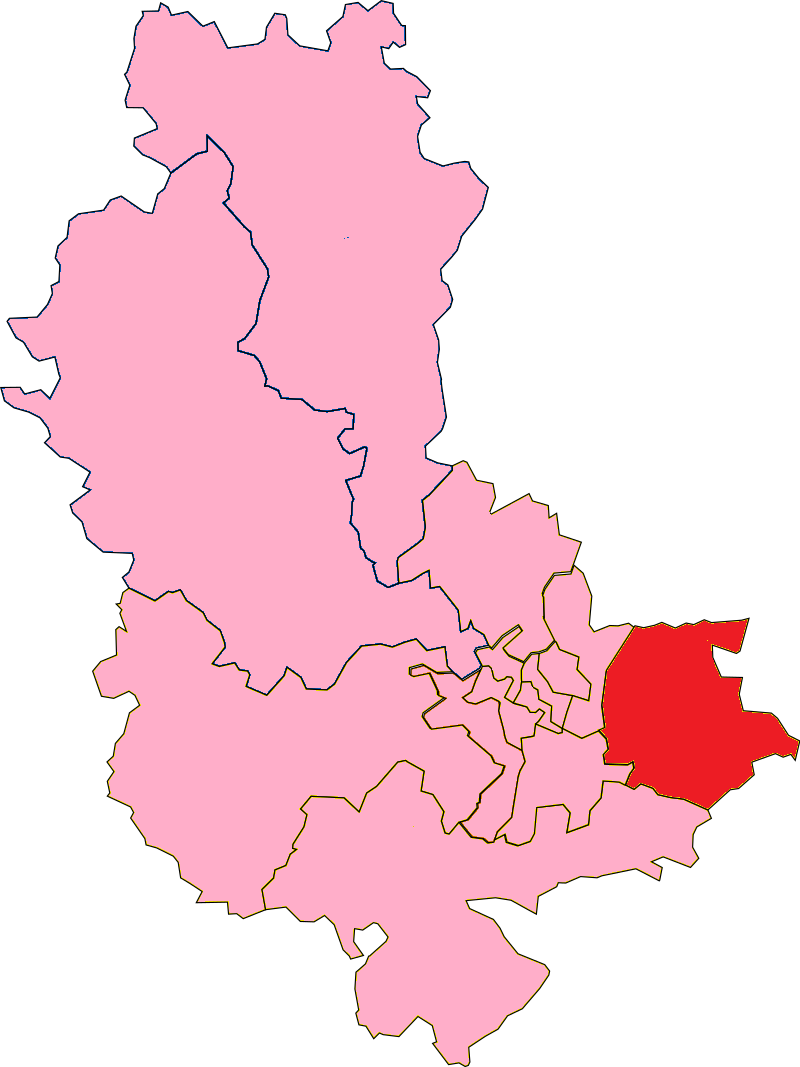
- Rhône's's 13th Constituency shown within the Rhône
- Deputy: Tiffany Joncour; RN
- Department: Rhône
- Cantons: Décines-Charpieu, Meyzieu, Commune de Saint-Priest (part)
- Registered voters: 84804

The 13th constituency of the Rhône (French: Treizième circonscription du Rhône) is a French legislative constituency in the Rhône département. Like the other 576 French constituencies, it elects one MP using a two round electoral system.

== Description ==
The 13th constituency of the Rhône lies to the east of Lyon and is largely suburban in character. The largest town in the constituency, Meyzieu, lies close to Lyon's main airport.

The constituency has elected by centre right and centre left representatives in recent years. At the 2017 election the PS vote collapsed to the extent that they came 6th in the first round with under 5% of the vote.

== Assembly Members ==
Election	Member	Party
1988	Jean Poperen	PS
1993	Martine David	PS
1997	Martine David	PS
2002	Martine David	PS
2007	Philippe Meunier	UMP
2012	Philippe Meunier	UMP
2017	Danièle Cazarian	LREM
2022	Sarah Tanzilli	LREM
2024	Tiffany Joncour	RN

== Election results ==
=== 2024 ===
Legislative Election 2024: Rhône's 13th constituency
Party	Candidate	Votes	%	±%
LR	Philippe Meunier	6,106	9.90	−5.60
RN	Tiffany Joncour	22,417	36.35	+14.69
LO	Michel Piot	523	0.85	N/A
DIV	Patrick Biaut	105	0.17	N/A
LFI (NFP)	Victor Prandt	16,178	26.23	+4.56
REC	Océane Gigarel	610	0.99	−4.51
RE (Ensemble)	Sarah Tanzilli	14,933	24.21	−4.23
DIV	Didier Barthès	799	1.30	N/A
Turnout		61,671	98.36	+52.00
Registered electors		89,801		
2nd round result
RN	Tiffany Joncour	28,872	51.87	N/A
LFI	Victor Prandt	26,794	48.13	+11.28
Turnout		55,666	89.72	+46.21
Registered electors		89,820		
RN gain from RE				

=== 2022 ===
Legislative Election 2022: Rhône's 13th constituency
Party	Candidate	Votes	%	±%
LREM (Ensemble)	Sarah Tanzilli	11,511	28.44	-5.55
LFI (NUPÉS)	Victor Prandt	8,771	21.67	+3.80
RN	Alain Pechereau	8,766	21.66	+7.29
LR (UDC)	Gilles Gascon	6,273	15.50	−5.31
REC	Océane Gigarel	2,228	5.50	N/A
DVE	Christina Perreira	831	2.05	N/A
DVE	Didier Barthès	810	2.00	+1.20
Others	N/A	1,283	-	−
Turnout		40,473	46.36	+0.45
2nd round result
LREM (Ensemble)	Sarah Tanzilli	22,378	63.15	+10.80
LFI (NUPÉS)	Victor Prandt	13,057	36.85	N/A
Turnout		35,435	43.31	+6.95
LREM hold				

=== 2017 ===
Legislative Election 2017: Rhône's 13th constituency
Party	Candidate	Votes	%	±%
LREM	Danièle Cazarian	13,234	33.99	
LR	Philippe Meunier	8,100	20.81	
FN	Sandrine Ligout	5,596	14.37	
LFI	Roland Pacaud	3,499	8.99	
DVD	Daniel Valero	2,994	7.69	
PS	Françoise Bergame	1,807	4.64	
EELV	Axel Marin	1,193	3.06	
Others	N/A	2,509		
Turnout		38,932	45.91	
2nd round result
LREM	Danièle Cazarian	16,141	52.35	
LR	Philippe Meunier	14,692	47.65	
Turnout		30,833	36.36	
LREM gain from LR				

=== 2012 ===
Legislative Election 2012: Rhône's 13th constituency
Party	Candidate	Votes	%	±%
UMP	Philippe Meunier	18,448	41.01	
PS	Farida Boudaoud	14,057	31.25	
FN	André Pozzi	8,013	17.81	
FG	Isabelle Chanvillard	2,218	4.93	
PRV	Florence Bocquet	952	2.12	
Others	N/A	1,293		
Turnout		44,981	56.58	
2nd round result
UMP	Philippe Meunier	25,169	59.51	
PS	Farida Boudaoud	17,123	40.40	
Turnout		42,292	53.20	
UMP hold				

=== 2007 ===
Legislative Election 2007: Rhône's 13th constituency
Party	Candidate	Votes	%	±%
UMP	Philippe Meunier	23,491	46.20	
PS	Martine David	14,774	29.06	
FN	Bruno Gollnisch	3,533	6.95	
MoDem	Chantal Genthon	2,730	5.37	
LV	Véronique Moreira	1,317	2.59	
PCF	Isabelle Chanvillard	1,038	2.04	
Others	N/A	3,959		
Turnout		51,393	56.24	
2nd round result
UMP	Philippe Meunier	28,729	57.17	
PS	Martine David	21,522	42.83	
Turnout		51,291	56.13	
UMP gain from PS				

=== 2002 ===
Legislative Election 2002: Rhône's 13th constituency
Party	Candidate	Votes	%	±%
PS	Martine David	16,988	33.01	
FN	Bruno Gollnisch	11,956	23.23	
UMP	Anne-Marie Dubost	10,977	21.33	
DVD	Alain Bernard	3,375	6.56	
DVD	Gerard Andrieux	2,301	4.47	
PR	Jean-Marc Chaffringeon	1,993	3.87	
Others	N/A	3,871		
Turnout		52,251	62.81	
2nd round result
PS	Martine David	20,197	42.22	
UMP	Anne-Marie Dubost	17,452	36.48	
FN	Bruno Gollnisch	10,186	21.29	
Turnout		48,518	58.32	
PS hold				

=== 1997 ===
Legislative Election 1997: Rhône's 13th constituency
Party	Candidate	Votes	%	±%
PS	Martine David	15,726	30.85	
FN	Bruno Gollnisch	14,603	28.65	
UDF	Jean-Loup Fleuret	11,267	22.11	
PCF	Françoise Pagano	3,455	6.78	
LO	Philippe Bruneau	1,399	2.74	
GE	Anne-Sophie Picard	1,395	2.74	
Others	N/A	3,123		
Turnout		52,856	67.11	
2nd round result
PS	Martine David	24,446	44.06	
UDF	Jean-Loup Fleuret	16,303	29.38	
FN	Bruno Gollnisch	14,733	26.55	
Turnout		57,115	72.52	
PS hold				
