= Martine David =

French politician (1952–2025)

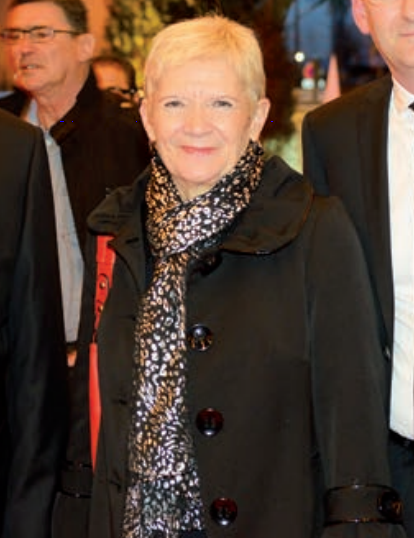
- David in 2013

Deputy of the French National Assembly for Rhône's 13th constituency
- In office 29 July 1988 – 19 June 2007
- Preceded by: Jean Poperen
- Succeeded by: Philippe Meunier

Mayor of Saint-Priest
- In office 29 November 2003 – 30 March 2014
- Preceded by: Bruno Polga
- Succeeded by: Gilles Gascon

Personal details
- Born: Martine Yvette Fouchier; 19 December 1952 Loches, France
- Died: 16 February 2025 (aged 72) Saint-Priest, France
- Party: PS
- Occupation: Secretary

Martine Yvette David (née Fouchier; 19 December 1952 – 16 February 2025) was a French politician of the Socialist Party (PS).

== Life and career ==
Born in Loches on 19 December 1952, David grew up in Décines-Charpieu. A secretary by profession, she joined the PS in 1971. She served on the Municipal Council of Décines-Charpieu after the 1983 municipal election.

In 1988, David was the substitute for Jean Poperen, elected to the National Assembly representing Rhône's 13th constituency. On 10 May 1988, Poperen was named Secretary of State for Parliamentary Affairs, allowing David to take the position on 29 July of that year. In 1993, she was elected to the seat in her own right, then was re-elected in 1997 and 2002.

In 2001, David became deputy mayor of Saint-Priest. On 29 November 2003, Mayor Bruno Polga resigned, leaving her to take the mayoralty. She was re-elected in 2008. In the 2007 legislative election, she was defeated by Union for a Popular Movement (UMP) candidate Philippe Meunier despite support from Ségolène Royal and Dominique Strauss-Kahn. She therefore lost her seat in the National Assembly that she had held for 19 years. In the 2014 municipal election, she lost her seat as mayor of Saint-Priest to UMP candidate Gilles Gascon despite support from Bruno Polga, Claude Bartolone, Najat Vallaud-Belkacem, and Manuel Valls. On 1 January 2013, she had been named a Knight of the Legion of Honour.

David died in Saint-Priest on 16 February 2025, at the age of 72.
