= Sathonay =

Former commune in France

Coordinates: 45°50′N 4°53′E

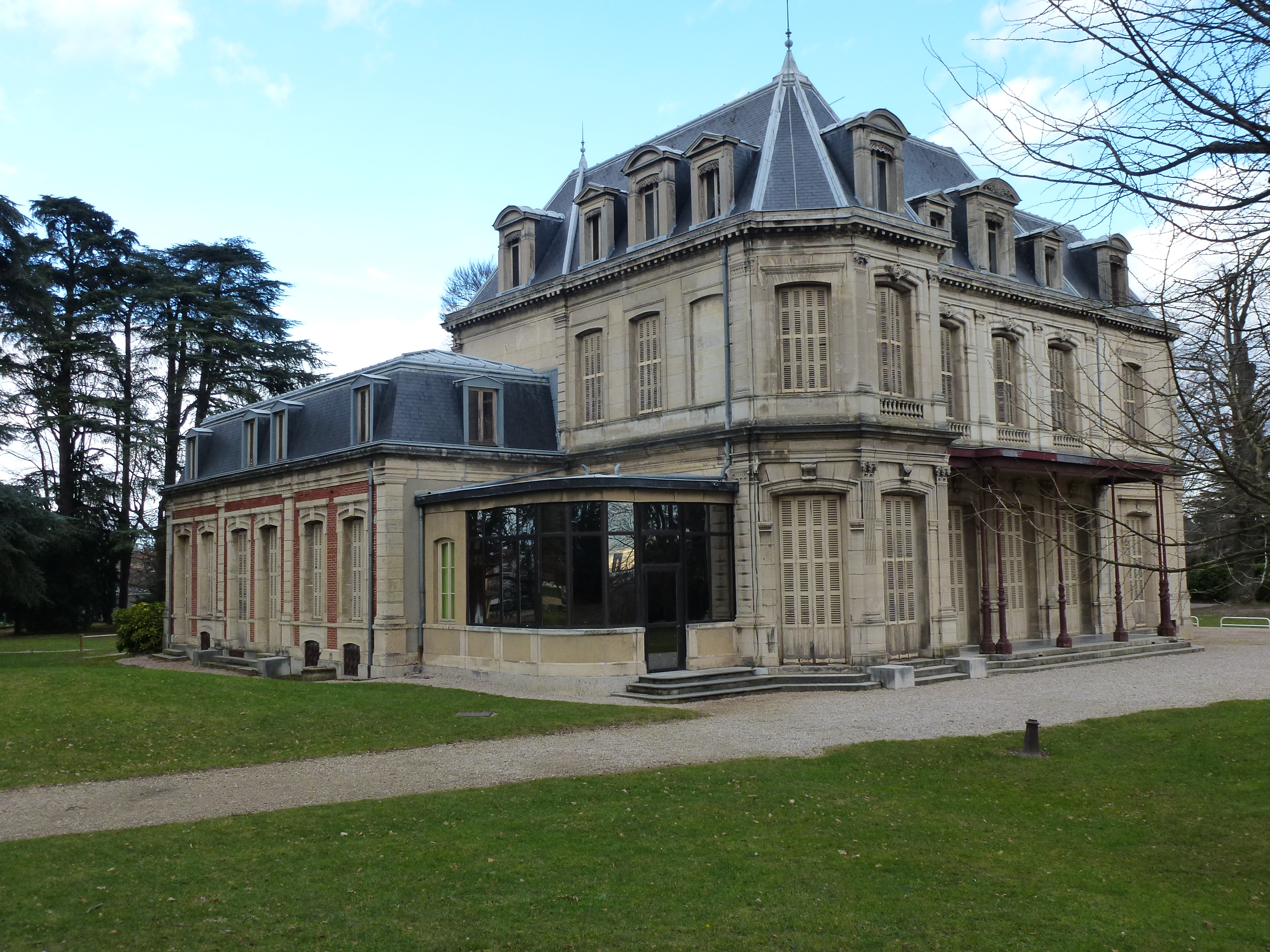
The castle of Bernis, in Sathonay-Village

Sathonay is a former commune of the Ain department in France. It was divided into two new communes in 1908: Sathonay-Camp and Sathonay-Village. Since 1968, these communes are not part of Ain any longer, but are part of the Rhône department.
