= Hôtel de Ville, Rillieux-la-Pape =

Town hall in Rillieux-la-Pape, France

Hôtel de Ville
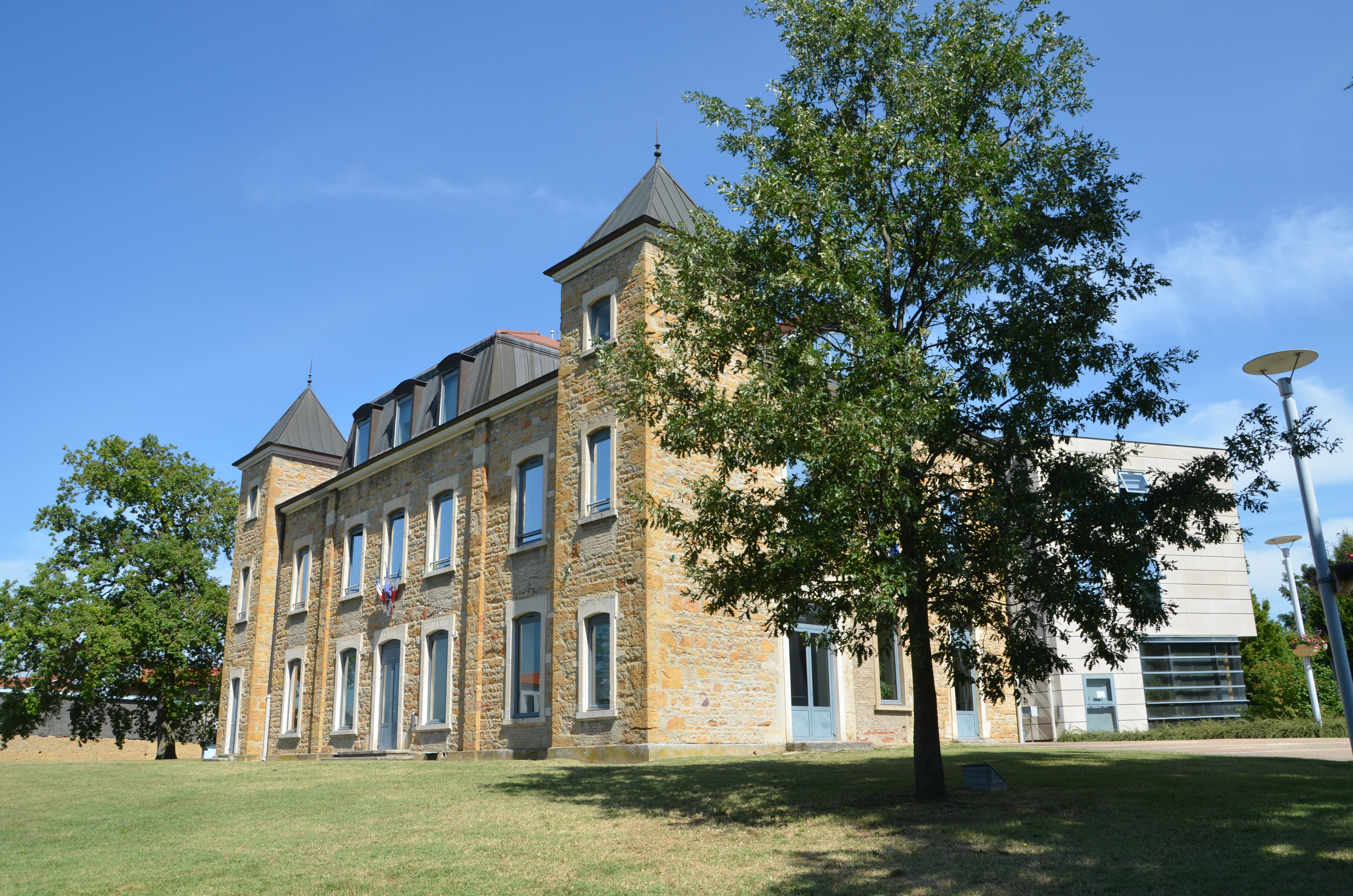
- The main frontage of the Hôtel de Ville in July 2013
- Interactive map of the Hôtel de Ville area

General information
- Type: City hall
- Architectural style: Neoclassical style
- Location: Rillieux-la-Pape, France
- Coordinates: 45.8187°N 4.8978°E
- Completed: c.1800

The Hôtel de Ville (French pronunciation: [otɛl də vil], City Hall) is a municipal building in Rillieux-la-Pape, Metropolis of Lyon in eastern France, standing on Rue Ampère.

== History ==
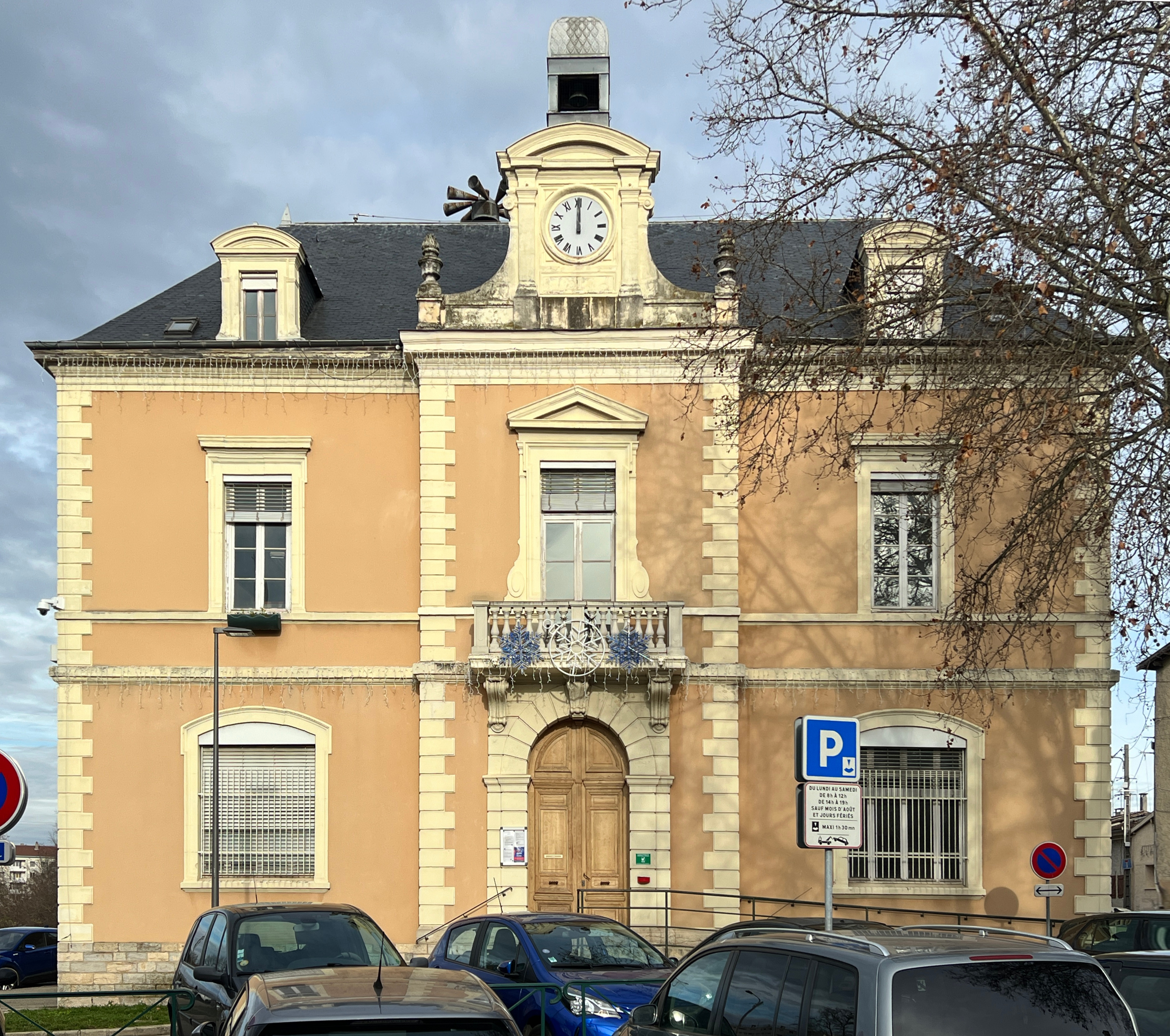
The old town hall

Following the French Revolution, the town council of Rillieux initially met in the house of the mayor at the time. This changed in the early 1860s, when the council decided to commission a dedicated town hall. The site they selected was on the northeastern side of Place de Verdun. The building was designed in the neoclassical style, built in brick with a cement render finish and was completed in 1867.

The design involved a symmetrical main frontage of three bays facing onto Place de Verdun. The central bay, which was slightly projected forward, featured a round-headed doorway with voussoirs and a keystone on the ground floor, a French door with a balustraded balcony and a triangular pediment on the first floor, and a clock flanked by pilasters supporting a segmental pediment at roof level. The outer bays were fenestrated by segmental headed casement windows on the ground floor, by square headed casement windows with cornices on the first floor, and by dormer windows at roof level. There were quoins at the outer edges of the bays.

On 3 September 1944, during the Second World War, the town was liberated by General Diego Brosset of the 1st Free French Division. His house was located just behind the old town hall.

In 1972, the commune of Rillieux merged with the commune of Crépieux-la-Pape to create the commune of Rillieux-la-Pape. The area straddling the two former communes became a Priority urbanization area (Zone à urbaniser par priorité (ZUP)). In this context the council of the new combined commune led by the mayor, Marcel-Yves André, decided to acquire a more substantial municipal building. The building they selected was the Château Ranvier located in a park between Rue Général Brosset and Rue Ampère. The first building on the site was occupied by the Farce family and may have dated back to the 16th century.

The current building was commissioned by Sieur Ranvier. It was designed in the neoclassical style, built in rubble masonry and was probably completed in around 1800. After Sieur Ranvier died, the house passed to his daughter Marie Ranvier and, following her marriage to a lawyer, Louis Montagnon, in April 1823, it was occupied the Montagnon family. It was later bought by Sieur Egraz, an industrialist from Bourg-en-Bresse. The former château was acquired by the council in 1976 and, after the completion of a programme of refurbishment works, re-opened as a municipal building in March 1977.

The design involved a symmetrical main frontage of seven bays facing southwest towards the centre of Lyon. The central bay featured a segmental headed doorway. The building was fenestrated by segmental headed casement windows on the first two floors. The central section of three bays was flanked by full height pilasters and fenestrated by dormer windows at attic level. The end bays, which were slightly projected forward, were formed by square shaped towers with pyramid-shaped roofs. A modern extension, located behind the former château, was completed in 1999. Internally, the principal room in the extension was the Salle du Conseil (council chamber).
