= Jean-Jack Queyranne =

French politician

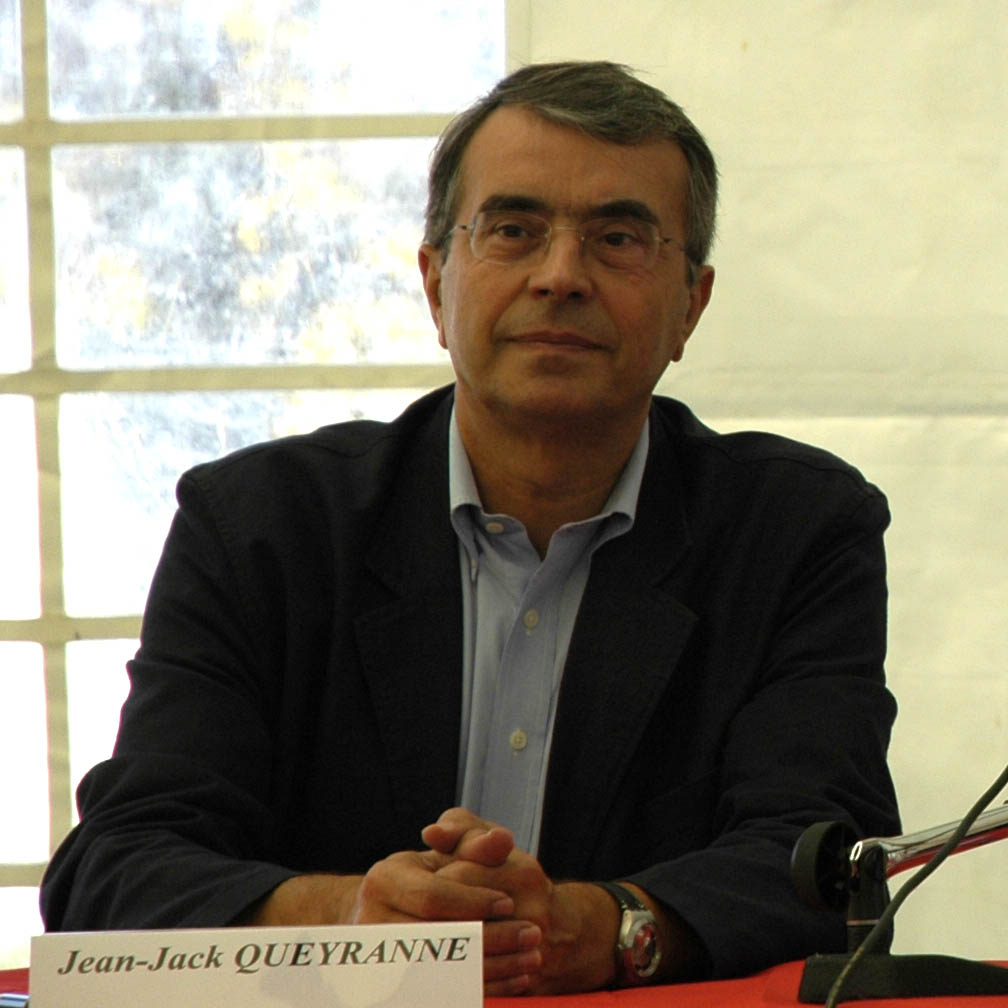

President of the Regional Council of Rhône-Alpes
- In office 28 March 2004 – 4 January 2016
- Preceded by: Anne-Marie Comparini
- Succeeded by: Laurent Wauquiez

Minister for the Relation with the Parliament
- In office 2000–2002
- President: Jacques Chirac
- Prime Minister: Lionel Jospin
- Preceded by: Daniel Vaillant
- Succeeded by: Jean-François Copé

Member of the National Assembly for Rhône's 7th constituency
- In office 2002–2012
- Preceded by: Jacky Darne
- Succeeded by: Hélène Geoffroy

Mayor of Bron
- In office 1989–1997

Personal details
- Born: 2 November 1945 (age 80) Lyon, France
- Party: Socialist Party
- Education: Sciences Po Lyon

Jean-Jack Queyranne (born 2 November 1945) is a French politician. He was the Regional President of the Rhône-Alpes from June 2002 until January 2016. He was a deputy in the National Assembly from the seventh district of Rhône. He is a member of the Socialist Party.

Queyranne replaced Charles Hernu in the National Assembly in 1981 when the latter was appointed to the government as Minister of Defense. He served in the National Assembly until 1993. In the 1997 legislative election, he was re-elected to the National Assembly and then joined the government as Secretary of State for the Overseas, under the Minister of the Interior. He remained in this position until he became Minister for Relations with Parliament on August 29, 2000, in which position he served until May 5, 2002.

He was Deputy Mayor (Adjoint au Maire) of Villeurbanne from March 1977 to June 1988, and he was subsequently Mayor of Bron from March 1989 to June 1997 and Deputy Mayor of Bron from June 1997 to April 2004. From March 18, 1985 to March 29, 1990, he was a member of the General Council of Rhône.

Queyranne was a member of the Regional Council of Rhône-Alpes from March 1978 to March 1979, from August 1981 to March 1986, and from March 1998 to July 2002. From 2004 to 2016, he was President of the Regional Council of Rhône-Alpes.

== Political career ==
Governmental functions

Minister for Relationships with Parliament : 2000–2002

Minister of Interior (interim) : 1998–1999.

Secretary of State for Overseas : 1997–2000.

Electoral mandates

National Assembly of France

Member of the National Assembly of France for Rhône (7th constituency) : 1981-1993 / Reelected in 1997, but he became minister / Since 2002. Elected in 1981, reelected in 1986, 1988, 1997, 2002, 2007.

Regional Council

President of the Regional Council of Rhône-Alpes : 2004–2016. Reelected in 2010.

Regional councillor of Rhône-Alpes : 1978-1979 / 1981-1986 / 1998-2002 (Resignation) / Since 2004. Reelected in 2004, 2010.

General Council

General councillor of Rhône : 1985-1990 (Resignation).

Municipal Council

Mayor of Bron : 1989-1997 (Resignation). Reelected in 1995.

Deputy-mayor of Bron : 1997-2004 (Resignation). Reelected in 2001.

Municipal councillor of Bron : 1989-2004 (Resignation). Reelected in 1995, 2001.

Deputy-mayor of Villeurbanne : 1977-1988 (Resignation). Reelected in 1983.

Municipal councillor of Villeurbanne : 1977-1988 (Resignation). Reelected in 1983.

Urban community Council

Vice-president of the Urban Community of Lyon : 1995-2004 (Resignation). Reelected in 2001.

Member of the Urban Community of Lyon : 1977-2004 (Resignation). Reelected in 1983, 1989, 1995, 2001.
