= Rhône's 7th constituency =

Constituency of the National Assembly of France

7th constituency of Rhône
- inline Constituency of the National Assembly of France

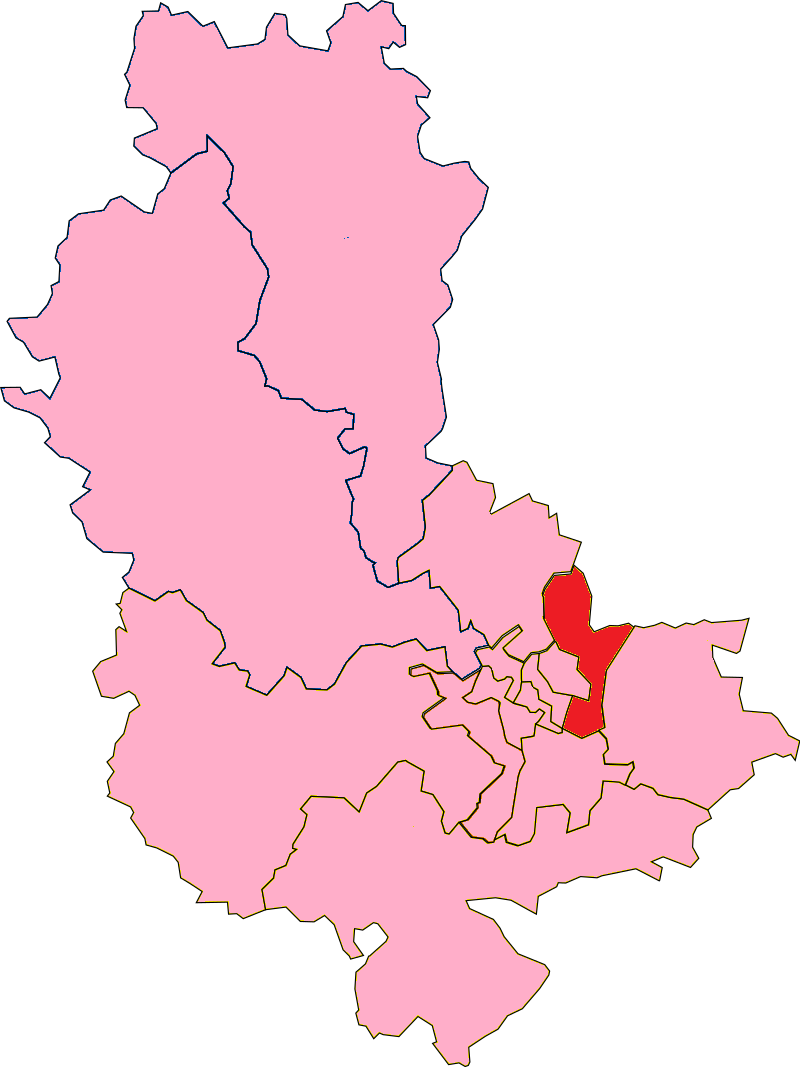
- Rhône's's 7th Constituency shown within Rhône
- Deputy: Abdelkader Lahmar; LFI
- Department: Rhône
- Cantons: Bron, Rillieux-la-Pape, Vaulx-en-Velin
- Registered voters: 68017

The 7th constituency of the Rhône (French: Septième circonscription du Rhône) is a French legislative constituency in the Rhône département. Like the other 576 French constituencies, it elects one MP using a two round electoral system.

== Description ==
The 7th constituency of the Rhône lies to the east of Lyon. It is a densely packed constituency predominantly made up of suburbs of the city divided from each other by the Rhône. One of these suburbs Vaulx-en-Velin lies between two branches of the river, surrounded on three sides by it and on the other by the Grand parc de Miribel-Jonage.

This constituency was one of the more left leaning in the department, until 2017 with the exception of 1993 it had always returned a PS deputy. At the 2017 elections the PS incumbent came 5th leaving En Marche! and The Republicans to fight the second round.

== Assembly members ==
Election	Member	Party
1988	Jean-Jack Queyranne	PS
1993	Jean-Pierre Calvel	UDF
1997	Jean-Jack Queyranne	PS
2002	Jean-Jack Queyranne	PS
2007	Jean-Jack Queyranne	PS
2012	Hélène Geoffroy	PS
2016	Renaud Gauquelin	PS
2017	Anissa Khedher	LREM
2022	Alexandre Vincendet	LR
2024	Abdelkader Lahmar	LFI

== Election results ==
=== 2024 ===
Legislative Election 2024: Rhône's 7th constituency
Party	Candidate	Votes	%	±%
LR	Myriam Fontaine	1536	3.52	−20.34
LFI (NFP)	Abdelkader Lahmar	20063	46.00	+15.01
HOR (Ensemble)	Alexandre Vincendet	11799	27.05	n/a
RN	Cédric Pignal	9280	21.28	+9.92
REC	Régine Benon	411	0.94	−2.88
LO	Thomas Spreux	526	1.21	n/a
Turnout		43,615	98.25	+59.17
Registered electors		72,607		
2nd round result
LFI	Abdelkader Lahmar	21,966	50.04	+4.04
HOR	Alexandre Vincendet	13214	30.10	+3.05
RN	Cédric Pignal	8721	19.87	−1.41
Turnout		43,901	98.51	
Registered electors		57.93		
LFI gain from HOR				

=== 2022 ===
Legislative Election 2022: Rhone's 7th constituency
Party	Candidate	Votes	%	±%
LFI (NUPÉS)	Abdelkader Lahmar	8,476	30.99	+1.77
LR (UDC)	Alexandre Vincendet	6,526	23.86	+2.05
LREM (Ensemble)	Anissa Khedher	4,728	17.29	−14.79
RN	Tiffany Joncour	3,108	11.36	−0.05
PS	Stéphane Gomez*	1,462	5.35	N/A
REC	Geneviève Lucchesi	1,045	3.82	N/A
Others	N/A	2,005	-	−
Turnout		27,350	39.08	−0.59
2nd round result
LR (UDC)	Alexandre Vincendet	14,801	53.44	+4.05
LFI (NUPÉS)	Abdelkader Lahmar	12,896	46.56	N/A
Turnout		27,697	40.58	+10.17
LR gain from LREM				

* Gomez stood as a PS dissident, without the support of the party or the NUPES alliance.

=== 2017 ===
Legislative Election 2017: Rhône's 7th constituency
Party	Candidate	Votes	%	±%
LREM	Anissa Khedher	8,656	32.08	
LR	Alexandre Vincendet	5,884	21.81	
LFI	Andréa Kotarac	3,600	13.34	
FN	Jean-Marie Nicolas	3,079	11.41	
PS	Ranaud Gauguelin	2,680	9.93	
EELV	Pierre Tchetche	908	3.37	
PCF	Paul Boghossian	695	2.58	
Others	N/A	1,479		
Turnout		26,981	39.67	
2nd round result
LREM	Anissa Khedher	10,466	50.61	
LR	Alexandre Vincendet	10,215	49.39	
Turnout		20,681	30.41	
LREM gain from PS				

=== 2012 ===
Legislative Election 2012: Rhône's 7th constituency
Party	Candidate	Votes	%	±%
PS	Hélène Geoffroy	12,713	40.42	
UMP	Yann Compan	5,459	17.36	
FN	Christophe Boudot	5,326	16.93	
FG	Bernard Genin	2,844	9.04	
DVD	Jean-François Debiol	1,880	5.98	
EELV	Françoise Mermoud	1,074	3.41	
MoDem	François-Xavier Penicaud	916	2.91	
Others	N/A	1,240		
Turnout		31,452	48.50	
2nd round result
PS	Hélène Geoffroy	17,303	60.07	
UMP	Yann Compan	11,501	39.93	
Turnout		28,804	44.42	
PS hold				

=== 2007 ===
Legislative Election 2007: Rhône's 7th constituency
Party	Candidate	Votes	%	±%
UMP	Jean-François Debiol	12,403	39.05	
PS	Jean-Jack Queyranne	10,745	33.83	
MoDem	Djamila Bouguerra	2,129	6.70	
FN	Alice Gillmann	1,683	5.30	
PCF	Marie-France Vieux-Marcaud	1,168	3.68	
Others	N/A	3,634		
Turnout		32,115	52.91	
2nd round result
PS	Jean-Jack Queyranne	16,591	52.27	
UMP	Jean-François Debiol	15,147	47.73	
Turnout		32,389	53.36	
PS hold				

=== 2002 ===
Legislative Election 2002: Rhône's 7th constituency
Party	Candidate	Votes	%	±%
PS	Jean-Jack Queyranne	12,375	38.11	
DVD	Charles Millon	7,270	22.39	
FN	Claude Jacquier	4,903	15.10	
UDF	Jean-Louis Vazette	3,680	11.33	
PR	Samir Khamassi	1,074	3.31	
RPF	Laurent Clamaron	745	2.29	
Others	N/A	2,427		
Turnout		32,956	61.68	
2nd round result
PS	Jean-Jack Queyranne	15,869	54.91	
DVD	Charles Millon	13,029	45.09	
Turnout		30,025	56.19	
PS hold				

=== 1997 ===
Legislative Election 1997: Rhône's 7th constituency
Party	Candidate	Votes	%	±%
PS	Jean-Jack Queyranne	10,161	29.53	
FN	Denis de Bouteiller	8,589	24.96	
UDF	Jean-Pierre Calvel	7,795	22.65	
PCF	Jean-Pierre Brunel	2,719	7.90	
LV	Jérôme Faynel	1,268	3.68	
LO	Didier Guthmann	1,029	2.99	
Others	N/A	2,851		
Turnout		35,578	63.75	
2nd round result
PS	Jean-Jack Queyranne	17,604	46.91	
UDF	Jean-Pierre Calvel	12,044	32.09	
FN	Denis de Bouteiller	7,880	21.00	
Turnout		38,551	69.07	
PS gain from UDF				
