= Danièle Cazarian =

French politician (born 1965)

Danièle Cazarian (born 31 August 1965) is a French politician of La République En Marche! (LREM) who served as a member of the French National Assembly from 2017 to 2022, representing Rhône's 13th constituency.

== Political career ==
In parliament, Cazarian serves as member of the Committee on Cultural Affairs and Education.

She stood down at the 2022 French legislative election, and her seat was held by LREM candidate Sarah Tanzilli.

== Political positions ==
In July 2019, Cazarian decided not to align with her parliamentary group's majority and became one of 52 LREM members who abstained from a vote on the French ratification of the European Union’s Comprehensive Economic and Trade Agreement (CETA) with Canada.

== See also ==
- 2017 French legislative election
