= Tiffany Joncour =

French politician (born 1989)

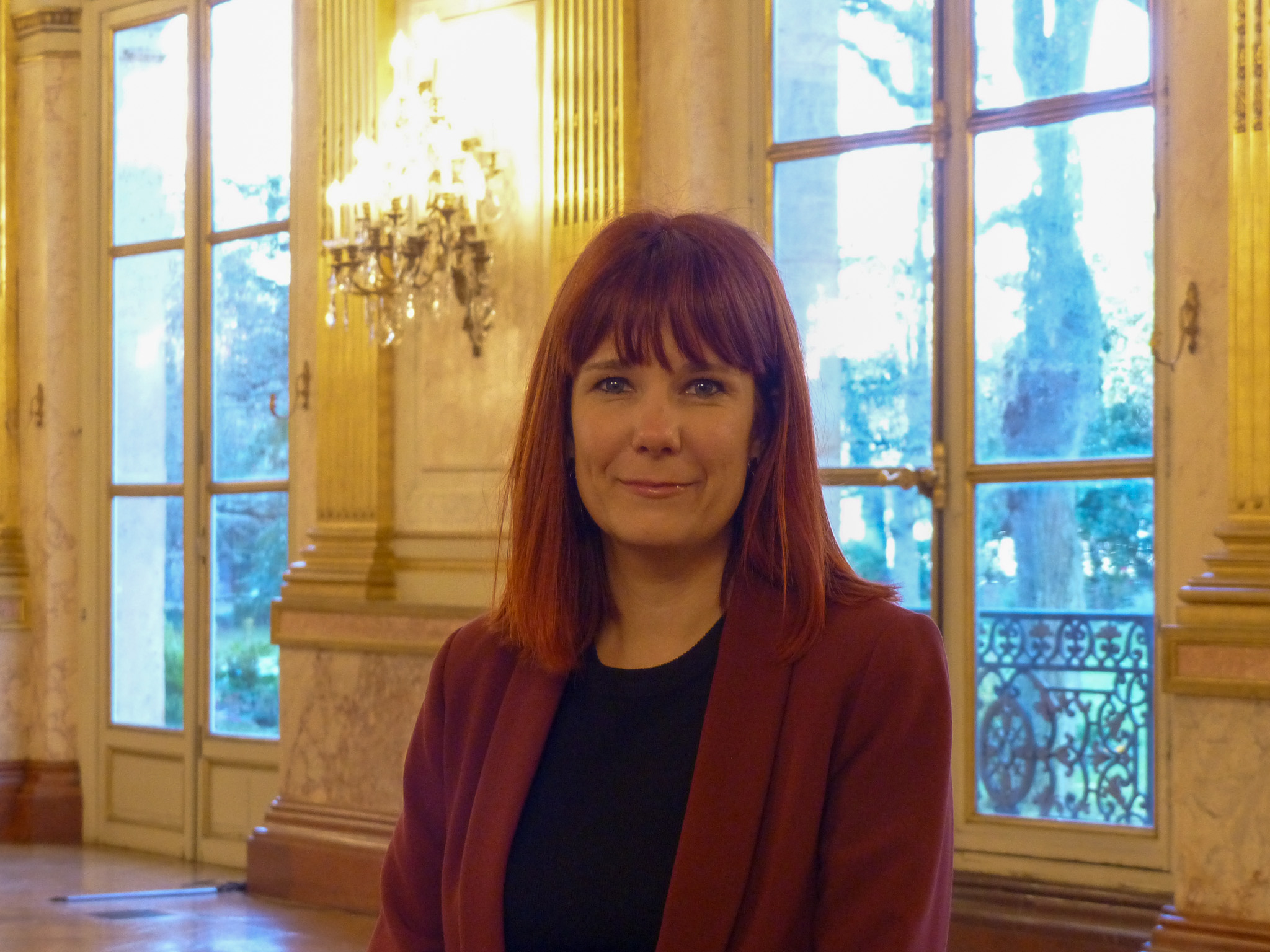

Member of the French National Assembly for Rhône's 13th constituency
- Incumbent
- Assumed office 18 July 2024
- Preceded by: Sarah Tanzilli

Personal details
- Born: 2 September 1989 (age 36)
- Party: National Rally

Tiffany Joncour (born 2 September 1989) is a French politician of the National Rally who was elected member of the National Assembly for Rhône's 13th constituency in 2024. She served as councillor of the 9th arrondissement of Lyon from 2015 to 2020, and was a candidate for Rhône's 1st constituency in 2017 and for Rhône's 7th constituency in 2022.
