= Hélène Geoffroy =

French politician

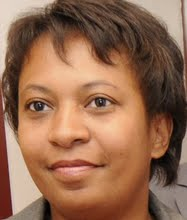

Mayor of Vaulx-en-Velin
- Incumbent
- Assumed office 4 July 2017
- Preceded by: Pierre Dussurgey

Member of the National Assembly for Rhône's 7th constituency
- In office 2012–2016
- Preceded by: Jean-Jack Queyranne
- Succeeded by: Renaud Gauquelin

Secretary of State for City policy
- In office 11 February 2016 – 10 May 2017
- President: François Hollande
- Prime Minister: Manuel Valls; Bernard Cazeneuve
- Preceded by: Patrick Kanner
- Succeeded by: Richard Ferrand

Personal details
- Born: 4 March 1970 (age 56) Creil, France
- Party: Socialist Party
- Education: Pierre et Marie Curie University

Hélène Geoffroy (born 4 March 1970) is a French politician who was elected to the French National Assembly on 17 June 2012 representing the department of Rhône.
