= Sarah Tanzilli =

French politician

Member of the National Assembly for Rhône's 13th constituency
- In office 19 June 2022 – 9 June 2024
- Preceded by: Danièle Cazarian
- Succeeded by: Tiffany Joncour

Personal details
- Born: 23 January 1985 (age 41) Valence, Drôme, France
- Party: Renaissance
- Education: Jean Moulin University Lyon 3

Sarah Tanzilli (born 23 January 1985) is a French politician from Renaissance (RE). She was Member of Parliament for Rhône's 13th constituency from 2022 to 2024.

== Biography ==
Sarah Tanzilli was born in Valence into a family of hairdressers from Armenia whose father was left-wing and her mother was right-wing. She holds a Master 2 in public business law. She is the mother of two children and has lived in Meyzieu since 2010.

Sarah Tanzilli was recruited as a lawyer in the Lyon metropolitan area where she worked for six years. She was then the collaborator of MP Danièle Cazarian during the 2017-2022 mandate. She was a member of the Committee for the Defence of the Armenian Cause from 2012 to 2022. chaired the House of Armenian Culture in Décines from 2017 to 2022. She participated in the dissolution of the far-right Turkish nationalist group Grey Wolves.

As a member of La République en marche, she was the candidate nominated by the Ensemble presidential majority in Rhône's 13th constituency in the 2022 French legislative election. She came in first position in the first round, with 28.44% of the votes cast, ahead of Victor Prandt the NUPES candidate. In the second round, she won the seat with 62.65% of the votes cast.

On 10 June 2024, she announced that she was a candidate for re-election in the snap 2024 French legislative election, while affirming that “France Insoumise is not in the Republican arc". She was defeated in the first round of this election.

== See also ==
- List of deputies of the 16th National Assembly of France
