= Rillieux-la-Pape =

- Commune
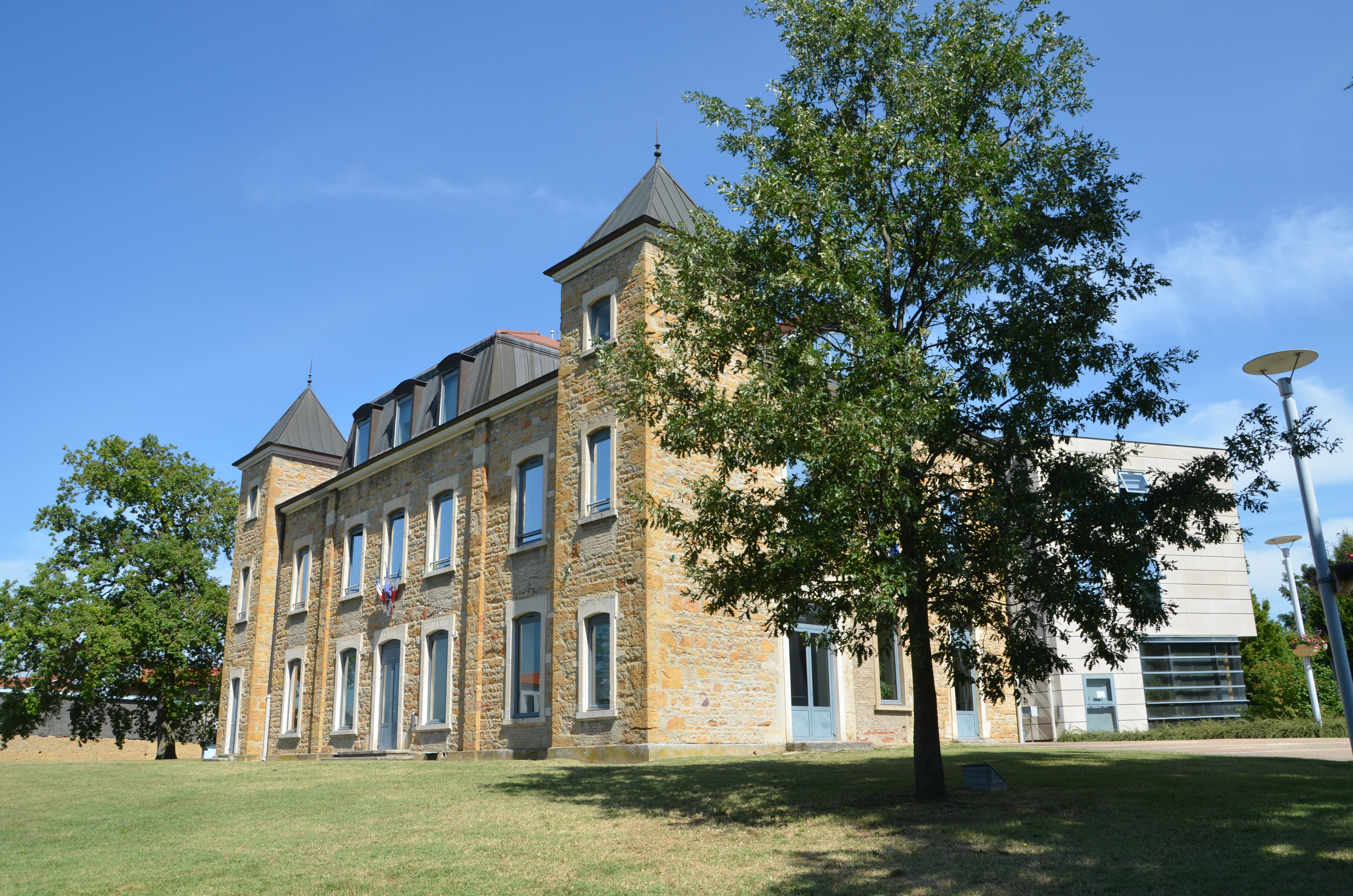
- The Hôtel de Ville

- Coat of arms
- Location of Rillieux-la-Pape
- Location within France Location within Auvergne-Rhône-Alpes
- Coordinates: 45°49′17″N 4°53′54″E
- Country: France
- Region: Auvergne-Rhône-Alpes
- Metropolis: Lyon Metropolis
- Arrondissement: Lyon

Government
  - Mayor (2024–2026): Alexandre Vincendet (LR)
- Area^{1}: 14.48 km^{2} (5.59 sq mi)
- Elevation: 269 m (883 ft)
- Highest elevation: 329 m (1,079 ft)
- Lowest elevation: 165 m (541 ft)
- Population (2023): 31,389
  - Density: 2,168/km^{2} (5,614/sq mi)
- Time zone: UTC+01:00 (CET)
  - Summer (DST): UTC+02:00 (CEST)
- INSEE/Postal code: 69286 /69140
- Website: Official website
- ^{1} French Land Register data, which excludes lakes, ponds, glaciers > 1 km^{2} (0.386 sq mi or 247 acres) and river estuaries.

Rillieux-la-Pape (French pronunciation: [ʁijø la pap]) is a commune in the Metropolis of Lyon in the Auvergne-Rhône-Alpes region of central-eastern France. In 2023, it had a population of 31,389. The commune was formed in 1973 by the merger of the former communes Rillieux and Crépieux-la-Pape.

== History ==
The Hôtel de Ville is a former château acquired in 1976.

== Population ==
Population data before 1975 refer to the former commune of Rillieux.

Historical population

Year	Pop.	±% p.a.
1793	922	—
1800	686	−4.14%
1806	750	+1.50%
1821	808	+0.50%
1831	958	+1.72%
1836	890	−1.46%
1841	943	+1.16%
1846	1,061	+2.39%
1851	1,116	+1.02%
1856	1,113	−0.05%
1861	1,174	+1.07%
1866	1,294	+1.97%
1872	1,314	+0.26%
1876	1,337	+0.43%
1881	1,267	−1.07%
1886	1,440	+2.59%
1891	1,414	−0.36%
1896	1,406	−0.11%
1901	1,520	+1.57%

Year	Pop.	±% p.a.
1906	1,568	+0.62%
1911	1,608	+0.51%
1921	1,684	+0.46%
1926	2,230	+5.78%
1931	1,602	−6.40%
1936	1,555	−0.59%
1946	1,458	−0.64%
1954	1,560	+0.85%
1962	3,281	+9.74%
1968	9,591	+19.58%
1975	30,894	+18.19%
1982	31,560	+0.31%
1990	30,791	−0.31%
1999	28,367	−0.91%
2007	29,546	+0.51%
2012	30,140	+0.40%
2017	30,012	−0.09%
2023	31,389	+0.75%

Source: EHESS and INSEE (1968-2023)

== Climate ==
Climate data for Rillieux-la-Pape (1971–2000 averages)
Month	Jan	Feb	Mar	Apr	May	Jun	Jul	Aug	Sep	Oct	Nov	Dec	Year
Mean daily maximum °C (°F)	6.2 (43.2)	8.4 (47.1)	12.4 (54.3)	15.3 (59.5)	20.0 (68.0)	23.5 (74.3)	27.0 (80.6)	26.7 (80.1)	22.3 (72.1)	16.7 (62.1)	10.2 (50.4)	7.1 (44.8)	16.3 (61.4)
Mean daily minimum °C (°F)	0.1 (32.2)	1.2 (34.2)	3.3 (37.9)	5.6 (42.1)	9.9 (49.8)	13.1 (55.6)	15.6 (60.1)	15.3 (59.5)	11.9 (53.4)	8.4 (47.1)	3.6 (38.5)	1.5 (34.7)	7.5 (45.4)
Average precipitation mm (inches)	52.9 (2.08)	50.5 (1.99)	54.8 (2.16)	72.3 (2.85)	87.8 (3.46)	80.2 (3.16)	62.0 (2.44)	69.0 (2.72)	88.3 (3.48)	94.7 (3.73)	75.1 (2.96)	55.5 (2.19)	843.1 (33.22)
Source: Météo France

== Notable people ==
- Alexandre Vincendet, mayor and MP

== Twin cities ==
Rillieux-la-Pape is twinned with three cities:

- Łęczyca, Poland
- Natitingou, Benin
- Ditzingen, Germany

== See also ==
- Communes of the Metropolis of Lyon
