= Food Social Security =

System ensuring universal right to food through democratically managed social funds

Sécurité sociale de l'alimentation
- Formation: project: 2017; 9 years ago collective: 2019; 7 years ago
- Founder: Engineers Without Borders (ISF-Agrista); Réseau Salariat; CIVAM Network; Confédération Paysanne; Collectif Démocratie Alimentaire; L'Atelier Paysan; VRAC (Vers un Réseau d'Achat en Commun); Réseau GRAP; Les pieds dans le plat; Les greniers d'abondance; AMAP (France)
- Type: Project
- Region served: France, Belgium, Luxembourg, Switzerland
- Method: Universality, social contributions, democratic contractual framework
- Website: securite-sociale-alimentation.org

Food Social Security (from the French Sécurité sociale de l'alimentation) is a socio-economic initiative drawing on the French Social security system and aiming to extend it to the food system, thus advocating multiple rights linked to the right to food, farmers' rights, and environmental protection. Funded through social contributions, each person would receive a fixed sum (e.g., 150€ monthly) to be spent only with food producers and retailers who have been democratically contracted, ensuring they meet social and environmental criteria. Carried by various actors from the civil society, it is currently being experimented at a local scale in various places in France, Belgium, Switzerland.

== Context ==
The idea of Food Social Security stemmed from noticing various flaws inherent to the current food system such as malnutrition, food insecurity, farmers' precarity and environmental concerns. Globally, while enough food is produced to feed ten billion people, food systems are threatening both human health and environmental sustainability. Food bank demand is soaring throughout the world, and is in itself not seen as a long-term response to food insecurity. Poor nutrition is generally linked to lower incomes, causing one of the largest public health challenges for children, and a significant strain on healthcare systems.

== Principles ==
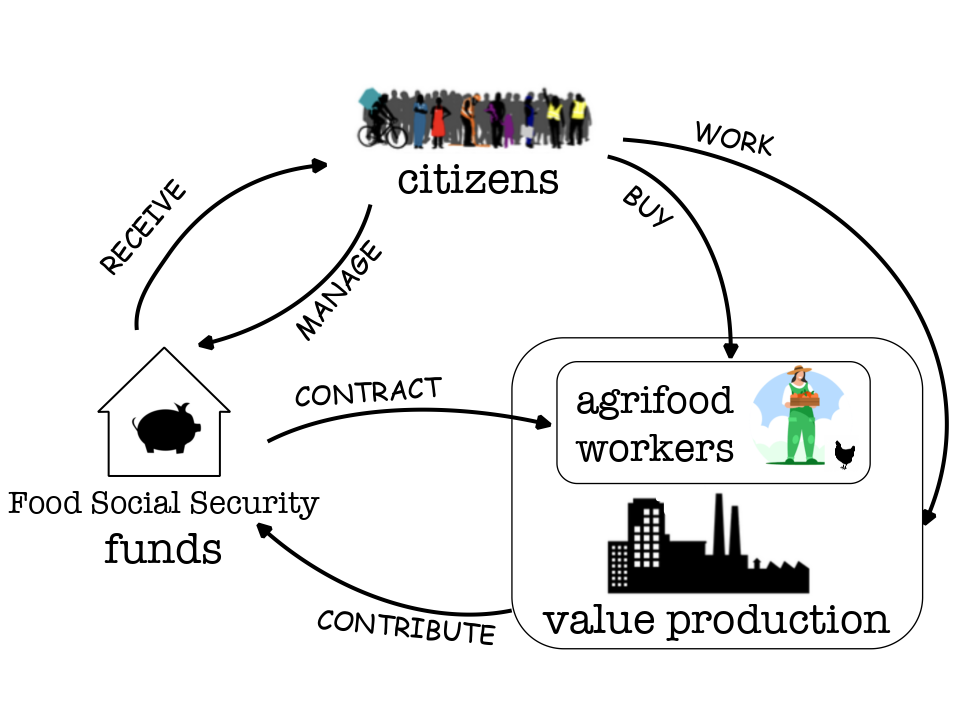
How Food Social Security works

The three fundamental principles of Food Social Security are:

- Universality of the right to food, in a similar way as described by the Food and Agriculture Organization of the United Nations. In practice, Food Social Security proposes a dedicated card available for everyone from birth to death, topped up monthly with €150 from socialised contributions.
- social contributions with a flat rate as a funding mechanism similar to the one used for healthcare.
- democratic contractual framework (conventionnement in French), here also based on the corresponding mechanism used in the healthcare system.

== Experiments ==
In 2022 an experiment inspired from Food Social Security was launched in Dieulefit (Drôme). In 2023, other experiments started in Gironde, Toulouse, Strasbourg, Clermont-Ferrand, Valencia (Spain), Montpellier, Paris, Cadenet (Vaucluse), followed by dozens of other municipalities across France which prepared experiments or reflection groups listed by the collective. The idea has also been taken up in Belgium since 2021, with pilot projects notably in Schaerbeek (Brussels Region) and in Wallonia, and in Switzerland since 2024.

As of 2025, the French collective's website lists more than 30 local experiments. Details of implementation vary across the trials, including the selection criteria for food shops and products, their quality, sustainability or geographic and economic accessibility. Although every experiment has been local, their main purpose is to gather enough momentum for the project to be adopted and implemented at the national scale.

== See also ==
- Social security in France
- Right to food
- Food sovereignty
- Food security
- Carte Vitale
