= Sathonay-Village =

- Commune
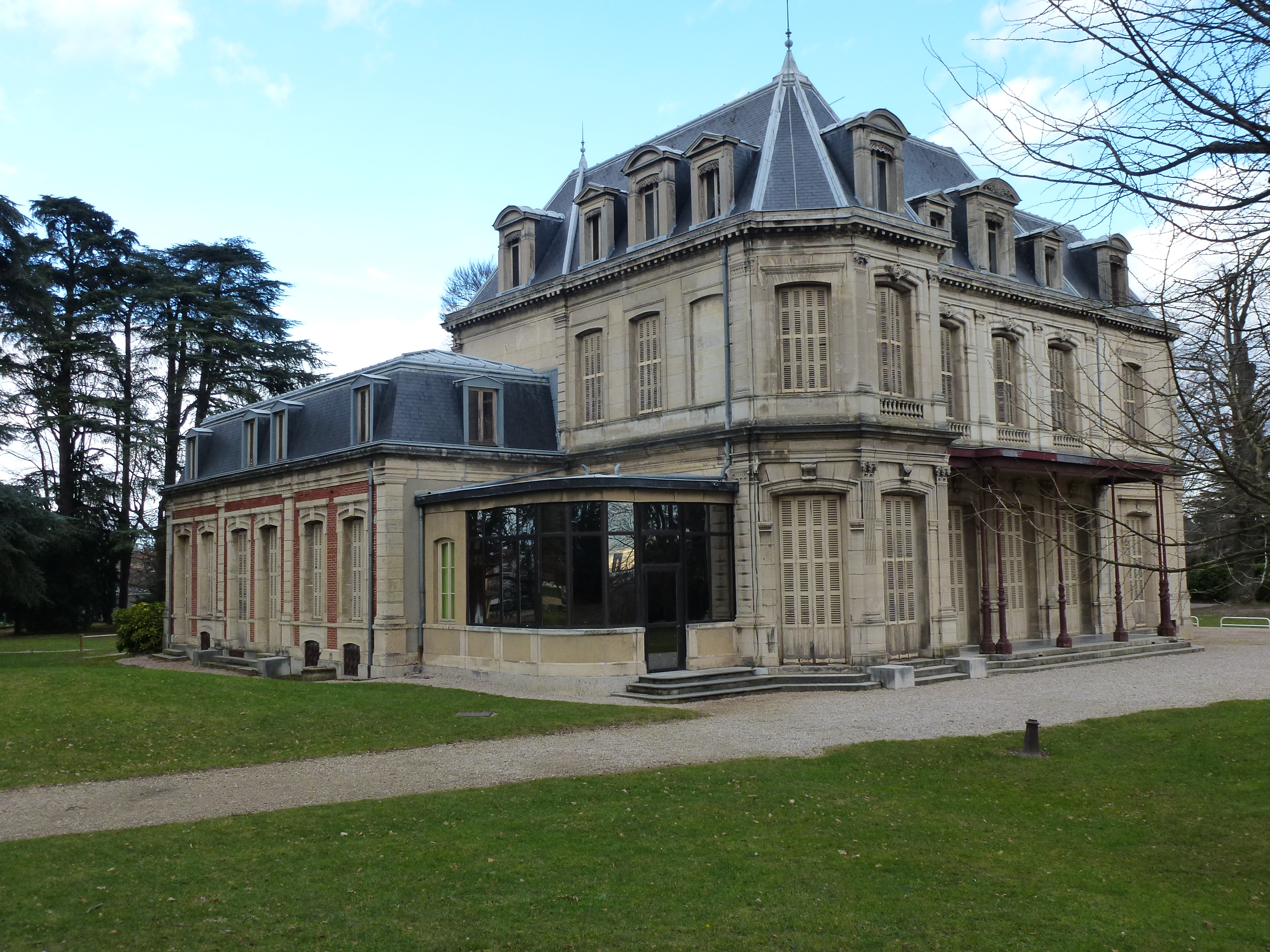
- The castle of Bernis, in Sathonay-Village

- Coat of arms
- Location of Sathonay-Village
- Location within France Location within Auvergne-Rhône-Alpes
- Coordinates: 45°50′02″N 4°52′41″E
- Country: France
- Region: Auvergne-Rhône-Alpes
- Metropolis: Lyon Metropolis
- Arrondissement: Lyon

Government
  - Mayor (2025–2026): Gilles Bidon
- Area^{1}: 5.15 km^{2} (1.99 sq mi)
- Elevation: 300 m (980 ft)
- Highest elevation: 329 m (1,079 ft)
- Lowest elevation: 198 m (650 ft)
- Population (2023): 2,412
  - Density: 468/km^{2} (1,210/sq mi)
- Time zone: UTC+01:00 (CET)
  - Summer (DST): UTC+02:00 (CEST)
- INSEE/Postal code: 69293 /69580
- ^{1} French Land Register data, which excludes lakes, ponds, glaciers > 1 km^{2} (0.386 sq mi or 247 acres) and river estuaries.

Sathonay-Village (French pronunciation: [satɔnɛ vilaʒ]) is a commune in the Metropolis of Lyon in the Auvergne-Rhône-Alpes region in central-eastern France. The commune was created in 1908, when the former commune Sathonay was split into the communes of Sathonay-Camp and Sathonay-Village.

== Population ==
Historical population
Year	Pop.	±% p.a.
1968	505	—
1975	675	+4.23%
1982	1,050	+6.52%
1990	1,401	+3.67%
1999	1,693	+2.13%
2007	1,870	+1.25%
2012	2,267	+3.93%
2017	2,360	+0.81%
2023	2,412	+0.36%
Source: INSEE

== See also ==
- Communes of the Metropolis of Lyon
