= Pierre-Alain Muet =

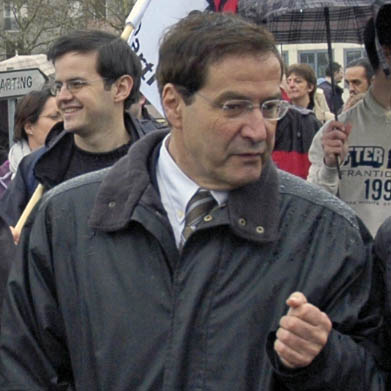

Pierre-Alain Muet (born 1 January 1945 in Lyon) was a member of the National Assembly of France. He represented the Rhône department from 2007 to 2017, as a member of the Socialiste, radical, citoyen et divers gauche.

== See also ==
- Conseil d'Analyse Économique
