= Sathonay-Camp =

- Commune
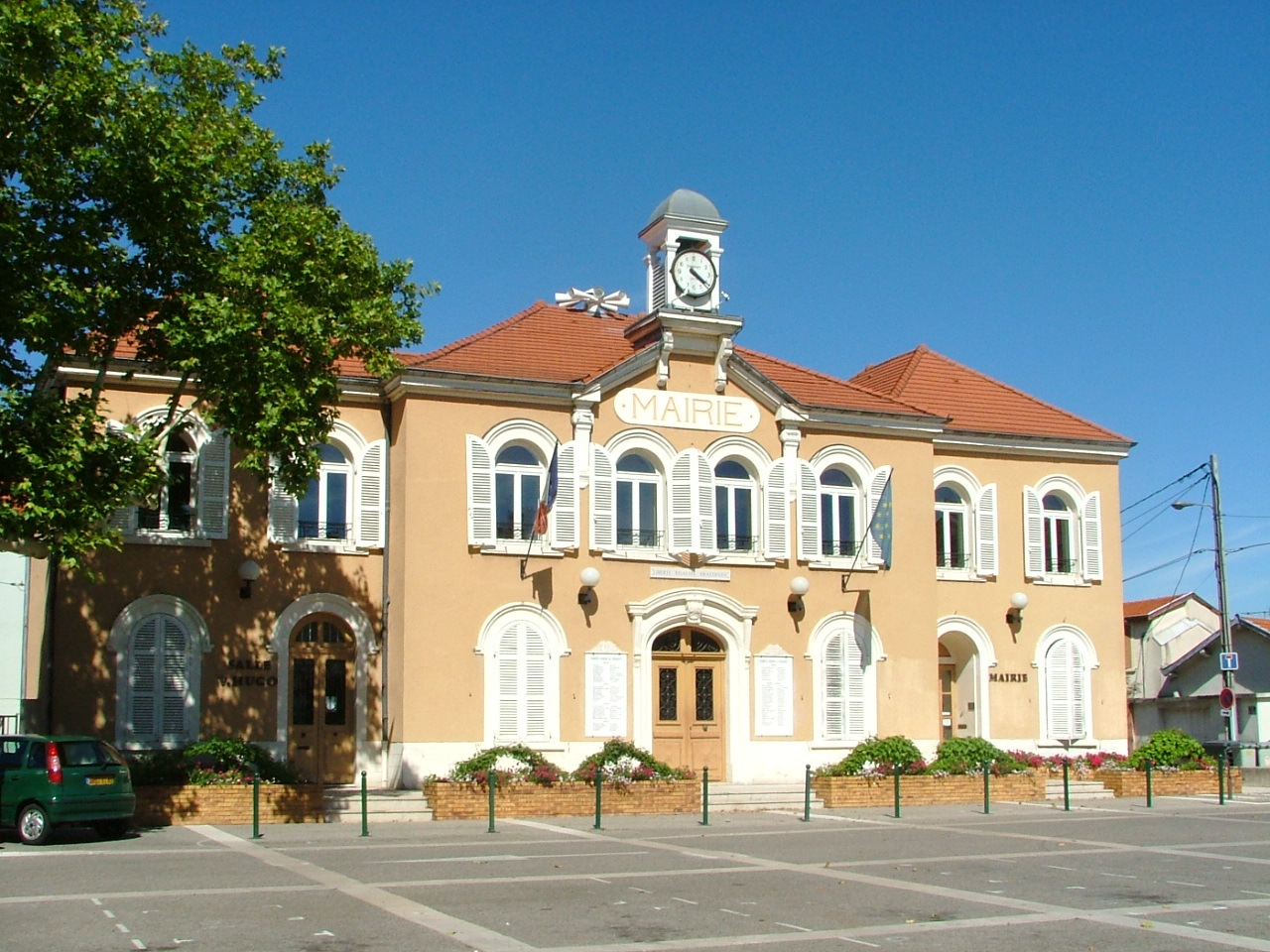
- Town hall of Sathonay-Camp

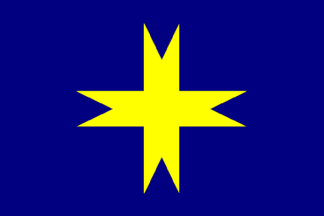
- Flag Coat of arms
- Location of Sathonay-Camp
- Location within France Location within Auvergne-Rhône-Alpes
- Coordinates: 45°49′27″N 4°52′29″E
- Country: France
- Region: Auvergne-Rhône-Alpes
- Metropolis: Lyon Metropolis
- Arrondissement: Lyon

Government
  - Mayor (2020–2026): Damien Monnier
- Area^{1}: 1.94 km^{2} (0.75 sq mi)
- Elevation: 282 m (925 ft)
- Highest elevation: 298 m (978 ft)
- Lowest elevation: 209 m (686 ft)
- Population (2023): 7,019
  - Density: 3,620/km^{2} (9,370/sq mi)
- Time zone: UTC+01:00 (CET)
  - Summer (DST): UTC+02:00 (CEST)
- INSEE/Postal code: 69292 /69580
- ^{1} French Land Register data, which excludes lakes, ponds, glaciers > 1 km^{2} (0.386 sq mi or 247 acres) and river estuaries.

Sathonay-Camp (French pronunciation: [satɔnɛ kɑ̃]) is a commune in the Lyon Metropolis (Auvergne-Rhône-Alpes region), eastern France. The commune was created in 1908, when the former commune Sathonay was split into the communes of Sathonay-Camp and Sathonay-Village. It serves as the south terminal of the LGV Sud-Est.

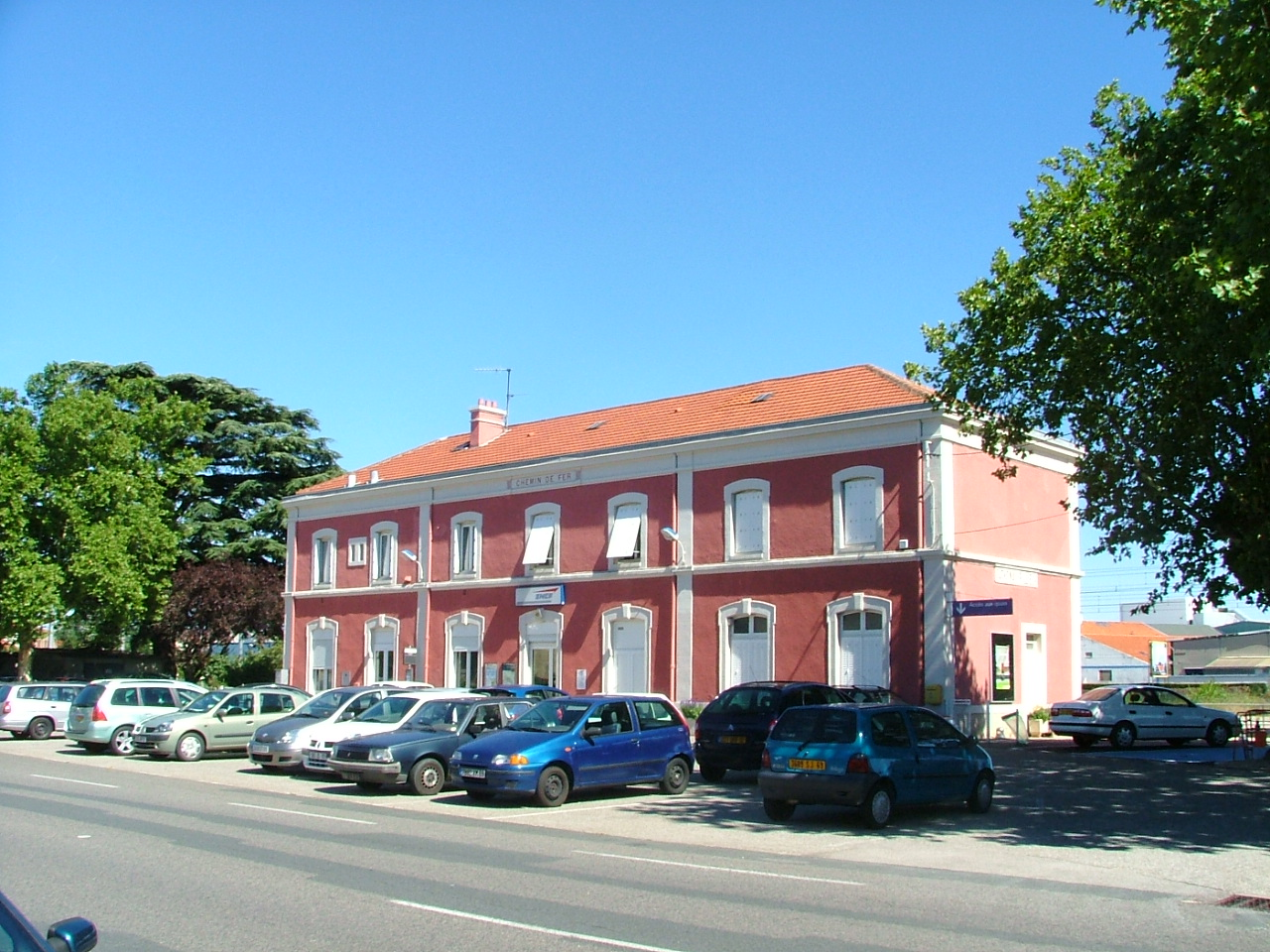
Train station

== Population ==
Historical population
Year	Pop.	±% p.a.
1968	3,938	—
1975	3,716	−0.83%
1982	4,352	+2.28%
1990	4,673	+0.89%
1999	4,336	−0.83%
2007	4,167	−0.50%
2012	4,123	−0.21%
2017	5,934	+7.55%
2023	7,019	+2.84%
Source: INSEE

== See also ==
- Communes of the Metropolis of Lyon
