= Philippe Meunier =

French politician

Philippe Meunier (French pronunciation: [filip mønje]; born 16 March 1966 in Bron, Rhône) is a former member of the National Assembly of France. He represented the Rhône department, and is a member of the Union for a Popular Movement.
