= Results of the 2024 French legislative election in Seine-et-Marne =

Following the first round of the 2024 French legislative election on 30 June 2024, runoff elections in each constituency where no candidate received a vote share greater than 50 percent were scheduled for 7 July. Candidates permitted to stand in the runoff elections needed to either come in first or second place in the first round or achieve more than 12.5 percent of the votes of the entire electorate (as opposed to 12.5 percent of the vote share due to low turnout).

== Seine-et-Marne ==
=== 1st constituency ===
Candidate	Party or alliance		First round		Second round	
Candidate	Party or alliance		Votes	%	Votes	%
Arnaud Saint-Martin	New Popular Front	La France Insoumise	14,701	33.31	16,967	37.72
Théo Michel	Union of the far right	The Republicans	14,542	32.95	16,110	35.82
Aude Luquet	Ensemble	Democratic Movement	12,816	29.04	11,900	26.46
Brigitte Lapeyronie	Reconquête		794	1.80		
Jean-Louis Guerrier	Far-left	Lutte Ouvrière	742	1.68		
Henri Komivi Djolegbehou	Miscellaneous right	Independent	298	0.68		
Hicham Aichi	Miscellaneous left	Independent	234	0.53		
Victoria Meimouni	Sovereigntist right	Independent	3	0.01		
Total			44,130	100.00	44,977	100.00
Valid votes			44,130	96.82	44,977	97.52
Invalid votes			400	0.88	285	0.62
Blank votes			1,048	2.30	861	1.87
Total votes			45,578	100.00	46,123	100.00
Registered voters/turnout			71,339	63.89	71,353	64.64

=== 2nd constituency ===
Candidate	Party or alliance		First round		Second round	
Candidate	Party or alliance		Votes	%	Votes	%
Ivanka Dimitrova	National Rally		18,887	35.06	21,007	40.02
Frédéric Valletoux	Ensemble	Horizons	18,171	33.73	31,490	59.98
Nour Benaïssa Watbot	New Popular Front	La France Insoumise	12,765	23.70		
Loïc Rousselle	Ecology	Independent	2,102	3.90		
Guillaume Cazauran	Reconquête		991	1.84		
Elodie Broch	Far-left	Lutte Ouvrière	419	0.78		
Stéphanie Faury	Far-left	Independent	377	0.70		
Valérian Lapkoff	Independent		152	0.28		
Sophie Balastre	Sovereigntist right	Debout la France	8	0.01		
Total			53,872	100.00	52,497	100.00
Valid votes			53,872	97.67	52,497	95.88
Invalid votes			358	0.65	543	0.99
Blank votes			926	1.68	1,715	3.13
Total votes			55,156	100.00	54,755	100.00
Registered voters/turnout			80,444	68.56	80,460	68.05

=== 3rd constituency ===
Candidate	Party or alliance		First round		Second round	
Candidate	Party or alliance		Votes	%	Votes	%
Davy Brun	National Rally		19,153	38.13	20,250	41.49
Jean-Louis Thiériot	The Republicans		15,914	31.68	28,560	58.51
Laura Vallée-Hans	New Popular Front	La France Insoumise	14,267	28.40		
Catherine Van Cauteren	Far-left	Lutte Ouvrière	896	1.78		
Total			50,230	100.00	48,810	100.00
Valid votes			50,230	97.55	48,810	95.68
Invalid votes			279	0.54	377	0.74
Blank votes			983	1.91	1,825	3.58
Total votes			51,492	100.00	51,012	100.00
Registered voters/turnout			77,914	66.09	77,929	65.46

=== 4th constituency ===
Candidate	Party or alliance		First round		Second round	
Candidate	Party or alliance		Votes	%	Votes	%
Julien Limongi	National Rally		27,317	47.64	29,118	51.70
Isabelle Perigault	The Republicans		16,060	28.01	27,203	48.30
Mathieu Garnier	New Popular Front	La France Insoumise	11,986	20.90		
Jean-Yves Gaudey	Far-left	Lutte Ouvrière	1,070	1.87		
Nicolas Fauveau	Reconquête		907	1.58		
Total			57,340	100.00	56,321	100.00
Valid votes			57,340	97.49	56,321	96.03
Invalid votes			299	0.51	579	0.99
Blank votes			1,178	2.00	1,751	2.99
Total votes			58,817	100.00	58,651	100.00
Registered voters/turnout			88,697	66.31	88,715	66.11

=== 5th constituency ===
Candidate	Party or alliance		First round		Second round	
Candidate	Party or alliance		Votes	%	Votes	%
Philippe Fontana	Union of the far right	The Republicans	23,820	41.77	25,175	45.60
Franck Riester	Ensemble	Renaissance	17,923	31.43	30,038	54.40
Laurie Caenbergs	New Popular Front	La France Insoumise	13,985	24.52		
Pascal Quenot	Far-left	Lutte Ouvrière	1,011	1.77		
Rudolf Larregain-Feller	Independent		288	0.51		
Michèle Durand	Sovereigntist right	Independent	2	0.00		
Total			57,029	100.00	55,213	100.00
Valid votes			57,029	97.32	55,213	95.33
Invalid votes			375	0.64	557	0.96
Blank votes			1,197	2.04	2,147	3.71
Total votes			58,601	100.00	57,917	100.00
Registered voters/turnout			89,794	65.26	89,815	64.48

=== 6th constituency ===
Candidate	Party or alliance		First round		Second round	
Candidate	Party or alliance		Votes	%	Votes	%
Béatrice Roullaud	National Rally		20,994	40.81	24,362	52.50
Amal Bentounsi	New Popular Front	La France Insoumise	15,548	30.22	22,041	47.50
Régis Sarazin	Miscellaneous right	The Republicans	13,739	26.70		
Annie Rieupet	Far-left	Lutte Ouvrière	1,167	2.27		
Total			51,448	100.00	46,403	100.00
Valid votes			51,448	97.24	46,403	89.17
Invalid votes			346	0.65	1,027	1.97
Blank votes			1,116	2.11	4,606	8.85
Total votes			52,910	100.00	52,036	100.00
Registered voters/turnout			82,904	63.82	82,921	62.75

=== 7th constituency ===
Candidate	Party or alliance		First round		Second round	
Candidate	Party or alliance		Votes	%	Votes	%
Agnès Laffite	National Rally		20,179	35.72	24,063	47.00
Ersilia Soudais	New Popular Front	La France Insoumise	18,557	32.85	27,137	53.00
Christian Robache	Ensemble	Horizons	10,611	18.78		
Rodrigue Kokouendo	Miscellaneous centre	Miscellaneous right	3,345	5.92		
Naïma Moghir	Miscellaneous centre	Ecologists	1,872	3.31		
Mathilde Yu-Yueng	Sovereigntist right	Debout la France	678	1.20		
Yannick Carlino	Reconquête		657	1.16		
Gabrielle Frija	Far-left	Lutte Ouvrière	587	1.04		
Maria Louro	Union of Democrats and Independents (Note: Dissident who ran without the support of Ensemble)		3	0.01		
Total			56,489	100.00	51,200	100.00
Valid votes			56,489	97.45	51,200	90.05
Invalid votes			423	0.73	1,141	2.01
Blank votes			1,056	1.82	4,514	7.94
Total votes			57,968	100.00	56,855	100.00
Registered voters/turnout			89,223	64.97	89,267	63.69

=== 8th constituency ===
Candidate	Party or alliance		First round		Second round	
Candidate	Party or alliance		Votes	%	Votes	%
Arnaud Bonnet	New Popular Front	The Ecologists	22,663	36.29	24,892	39.28
Hadrien Ghomi	Ensemble	Renaissance	20,622	33.03	21,411	33.79
Manon Mourgères	National Rally		17,465	27.97	17,066	26.93
Jean-Marc Moskovicz	Reconquête		869	1.39		
Frédéric Renault	Far-left	Lutte Ouvrière	822	1.32		
Henriette Sauvage	Sovereigntist right	Independent	1	0.00		
Henriette Sauvage	Ecologists	Independent	0	0.00		
Total			62,442	100.00	63,369	100.00
Valid votes			62,442	97.35	63,369	98.00
Invalid votes			379	0.59	287	0.44
Blank votes			1,320	2.06	1,009	1.56
Total votes			64,141	100.00	64,665	100.00
Registered voters/turnout			97,664	65.68	97,719	66.17

=== 9th constituency ===
Candidate	Party or alliance		First round		Second round	
Candidate	Party or alliance		Votes	%	Votes	%
Morgann Vanacker	National Rally		19,781	35.50	23,958	46.35
Céline Thiébault-Martinez	New Popular Front	Socialist Party	16,521	29.65	27,726	53.65
Michèle Peyron	Ensemble	Renaissance	12,023	21.57		
Franck Denion	Miscellaneous right	The Republicans	3,834	6.88		
Marie-Pierre Chevallier	Regionalism in France	Ecologists	1,745	3.13		
Kamal Valcin	Regionalism in France	Miscellaneous centre	775	1.39		
Bruno-Charles Delalandre	Reconquête		622	1.12		
Florence Woods	Far-left	Lutte Ouvrière	426	0.76		
Total			55,727	100.00	51,684	100.00
Valid votes			55,727	97.78	51,684	91.46
Invalid votes			283	0.50	911	1.61
Blank votes			980	1.72	3,915	6.93
Total votes			56,990	100.00	56,510	100.00
Registered voters/turnout			87,735	64.96	87,773	64.38

=== 10th constituency ===
Candidate	Party or alliance		First round		Second round	
Candidate	Party or alliance		Votes	%	Votes	%
Maxime Laisney	New Popular Front	La France Insoumise	22,558	43.94	32,280	69.06
Pryscillia Brach	National Rally		11,625	22.64	14,462	30.94
Stéphanie Do	Ensemble	Renaissance	7,445	14.50		
Michel Colas	The Republicans		5,722	11.15		
Joël Sangaré	Union of Democrats and Independents (Note: Dissident who ran without the support of Ensemble)		2,707	5.27		
Sylvain Cayard	Far-left	Lutte Ouvrière	688	1.34		
Philippe Dervaux	Reconquête		596	1.16		
Total			51,341	100.00	46,742	100.00
Valid votes			51,341	97.88	46,742	90.86
Invalid votes			327	0.62	952	1.85
Blank votes			787	1.50	3,749	7.29
Total votes			52,455	100.00	51,443	100.00
Registered voters/turnout			82,992	63.20	83,015	61.97

=== 11th constituency ===
Candidate	Party or alliance		Votes	%
Olivier Faure	New Popular Front	Socialist Party	21,643	53.42
Vincent Paul-Petit	Union of the far right	The Republicans	11,902	29.38
Ingrid Brulant-Fortin	Ensemble	Union of Democrats and Independents	5,797	14.31
Anne De La Torre	Far-left	Lutte Ouvrière	868	2.14
Flore Creantor	Regionalists	Independent	171	0.42
Dominique Mahé	Sovereigntist right	Independent	132	0.33
Total			40,513	100.00
Valid votes			40,513	96.10
Invalid votes			317	0.75
Blank votes			1,329	3.15
Total votes			42,159	100.00
Registered voters/turnout			66,897	63.02
