= Seine-et-Marne's 1st constituency =

Constituency of the National Assembly of France

1st constituency of Seine-et-Marne
- inline Constituency of the National Assembly of France

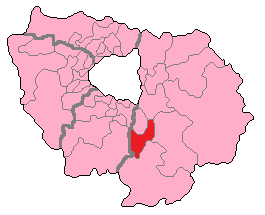
- Seine-et-Marne's 1st constituency shown within Île-de-France
- Deputy: Aude Luquet; MoDem
- Department: Seine-et-Marne
- Cantons: Melun-Nord – Melun-Sud – Perthes
- Registered voters: 67,677

The 1st constituency of Seine-et-Marne is a French legislative constituency in the Seine-et-Marne département.

== Description ==
The 1st constituency of Seine-et-Marne is focused on the town of Melun on the border with Essonne. Boundary changes prior to the 2012 elections created two new seats in Seine-et-Marne, one of which, Seine-et-Marne's 11th constituency, took the canton of Savigny-le-Temple from this seat.

Historically the seat has usually supported conservatives over the left with the exception of the period between 1973 and 1986 when it was held by Socialist Alain Vivien.

== Historic representation ==
Election	Member	Party
1958	Marc Jacquet	UNR
1962	Marc Jacquet	UNR
1962	Albert Görge	UNR
1967	Marc Jacquet	UDR
1968	Marc Jacquet	UDR
1973	Alain Vivien	PS
1978	Alain Vivien	PS
1981	Alain Vivien	PS
1986	Proportional representation – no election by constituency	
1988	Jean-Claude Mignon	RPR
1993	Jean-Claude Mignon	RPR
1997	Jean-Claude Mignon	RPR
2002	Jean-Claude Mignon	UMP
2007	Jean-Claude Mignon	UMP
2012	Jean-Claude Mignon	UMP
2017	Aude Luquet	MoDem
2022	Aude Luquet	MoDem

== Election results ==
=== 2024 ===
Candidate	Party	Alliance	First round			Second round		
Candidate	Party	Alliance	Votes	%	+/–	Votes	%	+/–
Arnaud Saint-Martin	LFI	NFP	14,701	33.31	+5.63	16,967	37.72	-9.22
Théo Michel	LR-RN	UXD	14,542	32.95	+13.92	16,110	35.82	N/A
Aude Luquet	MoDem	ENS	12,816	29.04	+1.80	11,900	26.46	-26.60
Brigitte Lapeyronie	REC		794	1.80	-3.19			
Jean-Louis Guerrier	LO		742	1.68	+0.78			
Henri Komivi Djolegbehou	DIV		298	0.68	N/A			
Hicham Aichi	DIV		234	0.53	N/A			
Victoria Meimouni	DIV		3	0.01	N/A			
Valid votes			44,130	96.82	-1.29	44,977	97.52	+5.14
Blank votes			1,048	2.30	+0.90	861	1.87	-3.66
Null votes			400	0.88	+0.39	285	0.62	-1.48
Turnout			45,578	63.89	+20.75	46,123	64.64	+22.11
Abstentions			25,761	36.11	-20.75	25,230	35.36	-22.11
Registered voters			71,339			71,353		
Source: Ministry of the Interior, Le Monde
Result						LFI GAIN FROM MoDem		

=== 2022 ===
Legislative election 2022: Seine-et-Marne's 1st constituency
Party	Candidate	Votes	%	±%
LFI (NUPÉS)	Arnaud Saint-Martin	8,427	27.68	+7.31
MoDem (Ensemble)	Aude Luquet	8,292	27.24	-10.15
RN	François Paradol	5,792	19.03	+4.47
LR (UDC)	Denis Jullemier	3,487	11.45	−6.83
REC	Jeannine Brandy	1,518	4.99	N/A
DVE	Dawé Zanifé	827	2.72	N/A
Others	N/A	2,101	6.90	
Turnout		30,444	43.14	+0.21
2nd round result
MoDem (Ensemble)	Aude Luquet	14,994	53.06	-2.95
LFI (NUPÉS)	Arnaud Saint-Martin	13,266	46.94	N/A
Turnout		28,260	42.53	+6.51
MoDem hold				

=== 2017 ===
Candidate	Label	First round		Second round	
Candidate	Label	Votes	%	Votes	%
Aude Luquet	MoDem	11,126	37.39	12,659	56.01
Denis Jullemier	LR	5,440	18.28	9,942	43.99
Stéfanie Coniglio	FN	4,333	14.56		
Bénédicte Monville	FI	3,802	12.78		
Nicolas Alix	PS	1,774	5.96		
Léa Huguet	DLF	714	2.40		
Nathalie Beaulnes-Sereni	DVD	542	1.82		
Franck Vezilier	DVD	503	1.69		
Yves Rémy	PCF	485	1.63		
Catherine Gallois	DIV	280	0.94		
Jean-Louis Guerrier	EXG	249	0.84		
Najib Azrgui	DIV	152	0.51		
Malika Hadbi	DVG	152	0.51		
Patrick Delvert	EXG	110	0.37		
Henri Komivi Djolegbehou	DVD	59	0.20		
Flavien Atse	DIV	32	0.11		
Bénédicte Savatier	DVD	7	0.02		
Votes		29,760	100.00	22,601	100.00
Valid votes		29,760	97.76	22,601	88.48
Blank votes		516	1.69	2,087	8.17
Null votes		167	0.55	856	3.35
Turnout		30,443	42.93	25,544	36.02
Abstentions		40,476	57.07	45,374	63.98
Registered voters		70,919		70,918	
Source: Ministry of the Interior

=== 2012 ===
2012 legislative election in Seine-Et-Marne's 1st constituency
Candidate	Party	First round		Second round	
Candidate	Party	Votes	%	Votes	%
Jean-Claude Mignon	UMP	14,403	38.37%	19,035	52.11%
Lionel Walker	PS	12,419	33.08%	17,492	47.89%
Béatrice Roullaud	FN	5,094	13.57%		
Pierre Carassus	DVG (RGR)	1,942	5.17%		
Thomas Guyard	FG	1,759	4.69%		
Bénédicte Monville-De Cecco	EELV	888	2.37%		
Emmanuelle Lopez	DLR	369	0.98%		
Dawé Zanife	??	231	0.62%		
Jean-Louis Guerrier	LO	160	0.43%		
Séverine Descateaux	AEI	150	0.40%		
Patrick Delvert	POI	122	0.33%		
Valid votes		37,537	99.07%	36,527	97.72%
Spoilt and null votes		354	0.93%	852	2.28%
Votes cast / turnout		37,891	55.90%	37,379	55.23%
Abstentions		29,894	44.10%	30,298	44.77%
Registered voters		67,785	100.00%	67,677	100.00%

=== 2007 ===
Legislative election 2007: Seine-et-Marne's 1st constituency
Party	Candidate	Votes	%	±%
UMP	Jean-Claude Mignon	24,021	49.11	
PS	Marie-Line Pichery	11,692	23.91	
MoDem	Aude Luquet	5,174	10.58	
LV	Jean-Marc Brûlé	2,231	4.56	
FN	Pierrette Magnien	1,879	3.84	
PCF	Corinne Bluteux	1,315	2.69	
Far left	Jean-Michel Richard	1,289	2.64	
Others	N/A	1,309		
Turnout		49,858	56.33	
2nd round result
UMP	Jean-Claude Mignon	26,294	56.98	
PS	Marie-Line Pichery	19,848	43.02	
Turnout		47,516	53.68	
UMP hold				

=== 2002 ===
Legislative election 2007: Seine-et-Marne's 1st constituency
Party	Candidate	Votes	%	±%
UMP	Jean-Claude Mignon	23,798	47.62	
LV	Jean-Marc Brûlé	14,404	28.82	
FN	Pierrette Magnien	5,760	11.52	
PCF	Jean-Pierre Poupard	1,500	3.00	
LCR	Patrick Desphelipon	1,387	2.78	
Others	N/A	3,131		
Turnout		50,746	62.40	
2nd round result
UMP	Jean-Claude Mignon	26,400	59.65	
LV	Jean-Marc Brûlé	17,859	40.35	
Turnout		45,636	56.13	
UMP hold				

=== 1997 ===
Legislative election 1997: Seine-et-Marne's 1st constituency
Party	Candidate	Votes	%	±%
RPR	Jean-Claude Mignon	16,571	33.94	
PS	Jean-Louis Mouton	11,657	23.88	
FN	Gérard Chrisment	7,195	14.74	
DIV	Lionel Walker	3,082	6.31	
PCF	Karine Jarry	2,978	6.10	
LV	Jean-François Zimmer	1,855	3.80	
LO	Daniel Lioubowny	1,449	2.97	
GE	Michel Isabelle	1,165	2.39	
DVD	Paul Trousseau	1,085	2.22	
Others	N/A	1,782		
Turnout		50,599	63.75	
2nd round result
RPR	Jean-Claude Mignon	27,687	54.11	
PS	Jean-Louis Mouton	23,481	45.89	
Turnout		53,897	67.91	
RPR hold				

== Sources ==
- Official results of French elections from 2002: "Résultats électoraux officiels en France" (in French).
