= Seine-et-Marne's 10th constituency =

Constituency of the National Assembly of France

10th constituency of Seine-et-Marne
- inline Constituency of the National Assembly of France

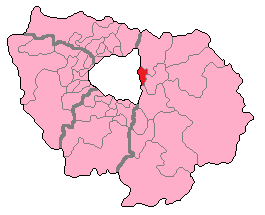
- Seine-et-Marne's 10th Constituency shown within Île-de-France
- Deputy: Maxime Laisney; LFI
- Department: Seine-et-Marne
- Cantons: Champs-sur-Marne – Chelles – Noisiel – Vaires-sur-Marne
- Registered voters: 79,365

The 10th constituency of Seine-et-Marne is a French legislative constituency in the Seine-et-Marne département.

== Description ==
The 10th constituency of Seine-et-Marne was created as a result of the 2010 redistricting of French legislative constituencies in which Seine-et-Marne gained two additional constituencies. The seat is a combination of territory from the old 7th and 8th constituencies. It is a relatively compact seat which contains much of the Marne-la-Vallée new town.

The seat was won comfortably by Émeric Bréhier of the PS at its first election in 2012. It was then taken by Stéphanie Do of LREM in the 2017 election. In the 2022 election, Do lost the seat to Maxime Laisney of LFI in a repeat of the second round of the previous election.

== Historic Representation ==
Election	Member	Party
2012	Émeric Bréhier	PS
2017	Stéphanie Do	LREM
2022	Maxime Laisney	LFI

== Election results ==
=== 2024 ===
Candidate	Party	Alliance	First round			Second round		
Candidate	Party	Alliance	Votes	%	+/–	Votes	%	+/–
Maxime Laisney	LFI	NFP	22,558	43.94	+6.79	32,280	69.06	+14.70
Pryscillia Brach	RN		11,625	22.64	+9.57	14,462	30.94	N/A
Stéphanie Do	DVD		7,445	14.50	N/A			
Michel Colas	LR		5,722	11.15	-0.35			
Joël Sangaré	UDI	ENS	2,707	5.27	-20.24			
Sylvain Cayard	LO		688	1.34	+0.22			
Philippe Dervaux	REC		596	1.16	-2.41			
Valid votes			51,341	97.88	+0.26	46,742	90.86	-3.59
Blank votes			787	1.50	+0.15	3,749	7.29	+3.43
Null votes			327	0.62	+0.11	952	1.85	+0.16
Turnout			52,455	63.20	+20.99	51,443	61.97	+19.62
Abstentions			30,537	36.80	-20.99	31,572	38.03	-19.62
Registered voters			82,992			83,015		
Source: Ministry of the Interior, Le Monde
Result						LFI HOLD		

=== 2022 ===
Legislative Election 2022: Seine-et-Marne's 10th constituency
Party	Candidate	Votes	%	±%
LFI (NUPÉS)	Maxime Laisney	12,544	37.15	+4.82
LREM (Ensemble)	Stéphanie Do	8,612	25.51	-12.61
RN	Cathy Francisco	4,412	13.07	+1.96
LR (UDC)	Ingrid Caillis-Brandl	3,882	11.50	−3.74
REC	Philippe Dervaux	1,204	3.57	N/A
DVE	Vincent Ruggeri	957	2.83	N/A
Others	N/A	2,151	6.37	
Turnout		33,762	42.21	−0.08
2nd round result
LFI (NUPÉS)	Maxime Laisney	17,724	54.36	+10.67
LREM (Ensemble)	Stéphanie Do	14,880	45.64	−10.67
Turnout		32,604	42.35	+8.44
LFI gain from LREM				

=== 2017 ===
Legislative Election 2017: Seine-et-Marne's 10th constituency
Party	Candidate	Votes	%	±%
LREM	Stéphanie Do	12,796	38.12	
LFI	Maxime Laisney	5,043	15.02	
UDI	Céline Netthavongs	4,288	12.77	
FN	Véronique Fornilli-Rata	3,729	11.11	
PS	Juliette Méadel	2,791	8.31	
PCF	Frank Mouly	1,598	4.76	
EELV	Pascal Vesvre	1,422	4.24	
LR	Olivier De Sousa	830	2.47	
Others	N/A	1,071		
Turnout		33,568	42.29	
2nd round result
LREM	Stéphanie Do	15,154	56.31	
LFI	Maxime Laisney	11,757	43.69	
Turnout		26,911	33.91	
LREM gain from PS				

=== 2012 ===
Legislative Election 2012: Seine-et-Marne's 10th Constituency 2nd round
Party	Candidate	Votes	%	±%
PS	Émeric Bréhier	23,116	60.70	
UMP	Claudine Thomas	14,966	39.30	
Turnout		39,126	49.95	

== Sources ==
Official results of French elections from 2002: "Résultats électoraux officiels en France" (in French).
