= Théo Michel =

French politician (born 1994)

Personal details
- Born: 13 September 1994 (age 31)
- Party: Union of the Right for the Republic (since 2024)
- Other political affiliations: The Republicans (until 2024)

Théo Michel (born 13 September 1994) is a French politician of the Union of the Right for the Republic. He was a vice president of The Republicans from 2022 to 2024. and served as secretary general of its youth wing Les Jeunes Républicains.

== Early life and career ==
Michel was born in September 1994. His family is from Toulouse and he has Polish maternal ancestors. He worked as an economist for Deloitte and was appointed as councillor for new enterprises of the 17th arrondissement of Paris, and as deputy leader of Les Jeunes Républicains in Paris. He supported the election of Christian Jacob as leader of The Republicans in 2019, and was critical of a return to the party by former members Valérie Pécresse and Xavier Bertrand.

In 2021, Michel was a candidate for leader of Les Jeunes Républicains. He withdrew from the election in March 2021 to support the candidacy of Guilhem Carayon, and was appointed as secretary general of the organization. Ahead of the 2021 party congress for the 2022 presidential election, he was initially neutral, and later supported the candidacy of Xavier Bertrand. In September 2022, he was appointed councillor for public order of the 17th arrondissement of Paris. He endorsed Éric Ciotti for the 2022 party leadership election, and was appointed as a vice president of the party upon his election.

In the 2024 legislative election, Michel was the candidate of The Republicans for Seine-et-Marne's 1st constituency, with the support of the National Rally. He described the alliance as a right-wing response to the left-wing New Popular Front, as a way to "restore France and achieve a majority in the National Assembly." He advanced to a triangular runoff against Arnaud Saint-Martin and Aude Luquet, and was defeated by Saint-Martin. In October 2024, he founded the Seine-et-Marne branch of Ciotti's newly founded Union of the Right for the Republic, and was appointed deputy secretary general of the party and as its departmental delegate in Seine-et-Marne. His investiture as departmental delegate took place on 18 October 2024 and was attended by Aymeric Durox.

Within The Republicans, Michel was described as being part of the party's right-wing faction. His ideology has been described as similar to that of the Rally for the Republic in the 1980s. He declared his support for a "major liberal shift" in French politics in 2021, describing it as "the only solution that has not been tried in forty years," and sought to evoke a "Thatcherite revolution" in response to a perceived excess of taxes, norms and non-wage labour costs. He has been described as Orléanist and economically liberal, and supports controlled immigration and cultural assimilation as means against Islamism. In 2021, he stated that he had supported Éric Zemmour's address to The Republicans in 2019, while declaring that he did not support Zemmour becoming leader of the party. For the 2024 legislative election, he listed purchasing power, security and immigration as his three priorities.
