= Daniel Vachez =

French politician (1946–2021)

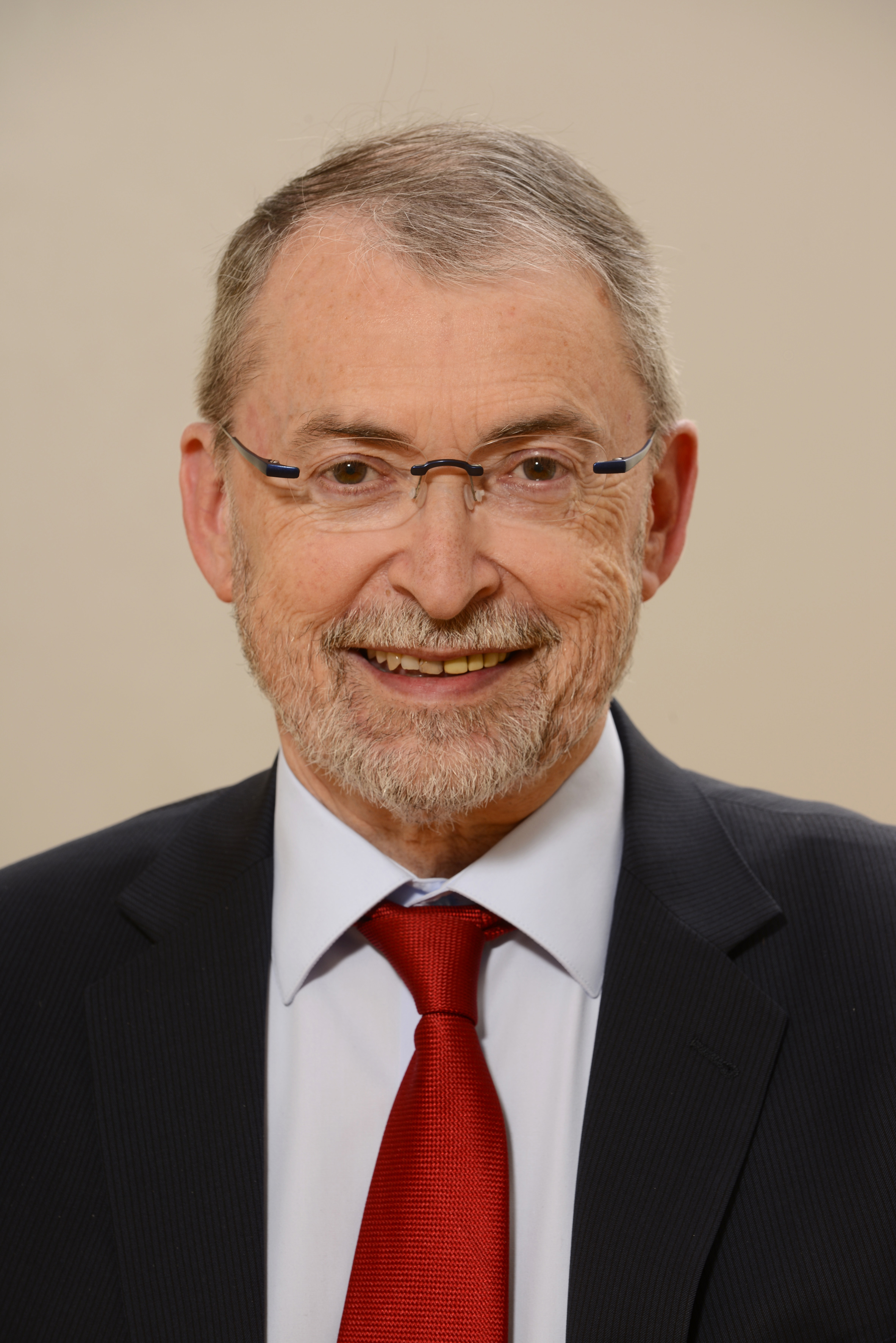

Mayor of Noisiel
- In office 1980–2017
- Preceded by: Louis Antoine Paul Guilbert
- Succeeded by: Mathieu Viskovic

Member of the National Assembly for Seine-et-Marne's 8th constituency
- In office 12 June 1997 – 18 June 2002
- Preceded by: Gérard Jeffray
- Succeeded by: Chantal Brunel

Personal details
- Born: 3 October 1946 Lyon, France
- Died: 15 March 2021 (aged 74)
- Party: PS

Daniel Vachez (3 October 1946 – 15 March 2021) was a French politician. A member of the Socialist Party, he served as mayor of Noisiel from 1980 until 2017 and as a member of the National Assembly for Seine-et-Marne's 8th constituency from 1997 until 2002.

== Life ==
Vachez worked in a bank before moving to Noisiel. He became deputy mayor of Noisiel in 1977 and mayor in 1980.

Vachez was a member of the National Assembly from 1997 to 2002.

In 2014 Vachez was promoted to the rank of Chevalier of the Légion d'honneur. He resigned as mayor of Noisiel in 2017.

Vachez died on 15 March 2021 and was survived by his wife, children and grandchildren.
