= Jean-Michel Fauvergue =

French politician (born 1957)

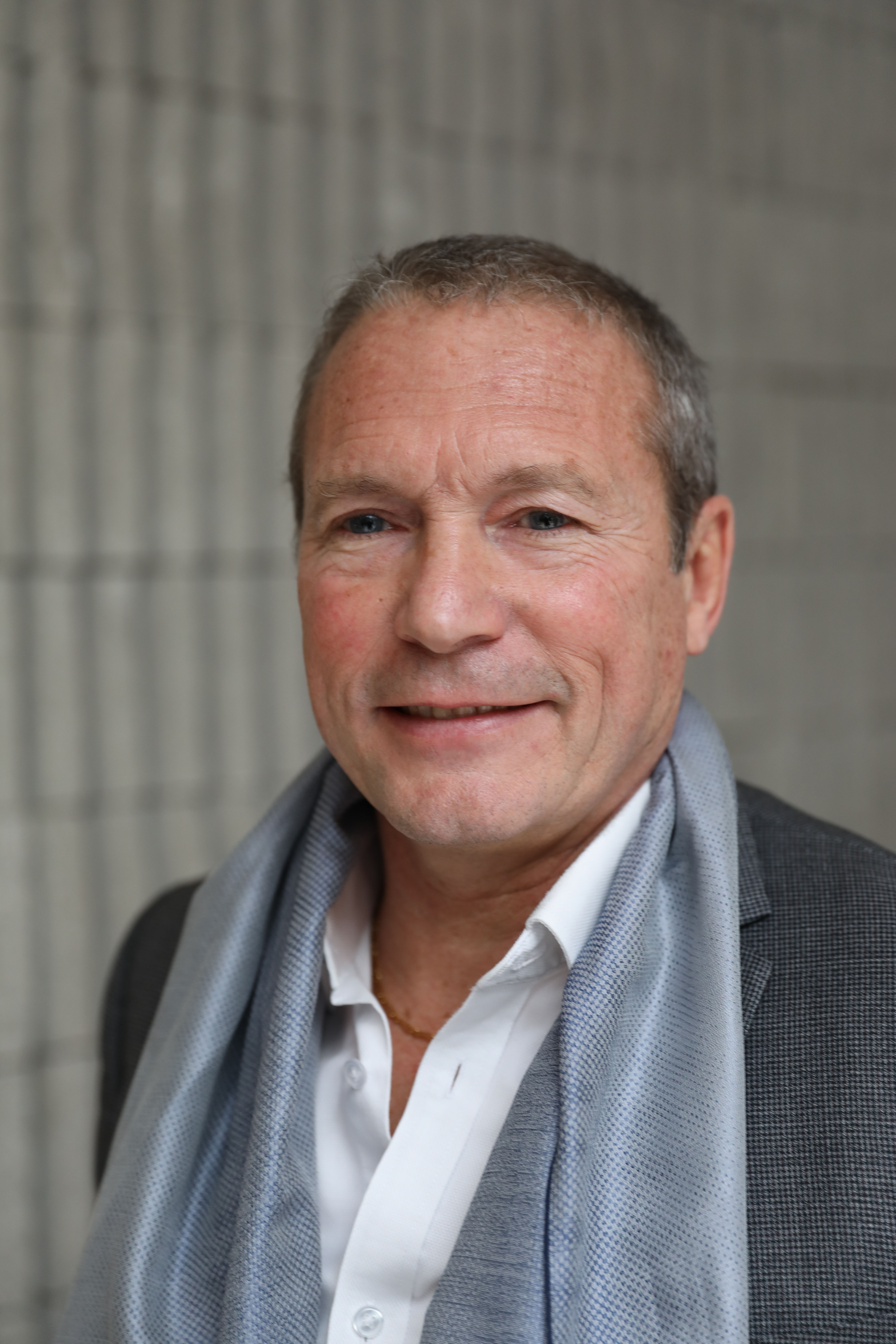

Member of the National Assembly for Seine-et-Marne's 8th constituency
- In office 21 June 2017 – 21 June 2022
- Preceded by: Eduardo Rihan Cypel
- Succeeded by: Hadrien Ghomi

Personal details
- Born: 31 January 1957 (age 69) Bages, France
- Party: Renaissance (2017–present)
- Occupation: Police officer

Jean-Michel Fauvergue (French pronunciation: [ʒamiʃɛl fovɛʁɡ]; born 31 January 1957) is a French retired police officer and politician who served in the National Assembly from 2017 to 2022, representing the 8th constituency of the Seine-et-Marne department. He is a member of Renaissance (RE, formerly La République En Marche!), which he joined in 2017.

== Early career ==
Before entering politics, Fauvergue was the commander of the RAID special police forces unit (2013–2017) which carried out the raids in response to the January and November 2015 Paris attacks. He retired from the National Police in 2017 with the rank of commissioner.

== Political career ==
In the 2017 legislative election, Fauvergue won Seine-et-Marne's 8th constituency with 67.1% of the second-round vote against Chantal Brunel of The Republicans, who previously held the seat from 2002 to 2012.

As a parliamentarian, Fauvergue served on the Committee on Legal Affairs. Together with Alice Thourot, he co-authored a 2018 report with more than 70 recommendations on how to support security forces and the Municipal Police in France. In 2020, he served as co-capporteur (alongside Thourot) on a law proposed by Minister of the Interior Gérald Darmanin to criminalise the dissemination of images showing law enforcement officers with the intention of causing harm to them.

He declined to run for re-election to a second term in 2022.

== Political positions ==
In July 2019, Fauvergue voted in favour of the French ratification of the European Union's Comprehensive Economic and Trade Agreement (CETA) with Canada.

== Honours ==
- Knight of the Legion of Honour (2010)
- Officer of the Ordre national du Mérite (2015)
