= Nicole Bricq =

French politician (1947–2017)

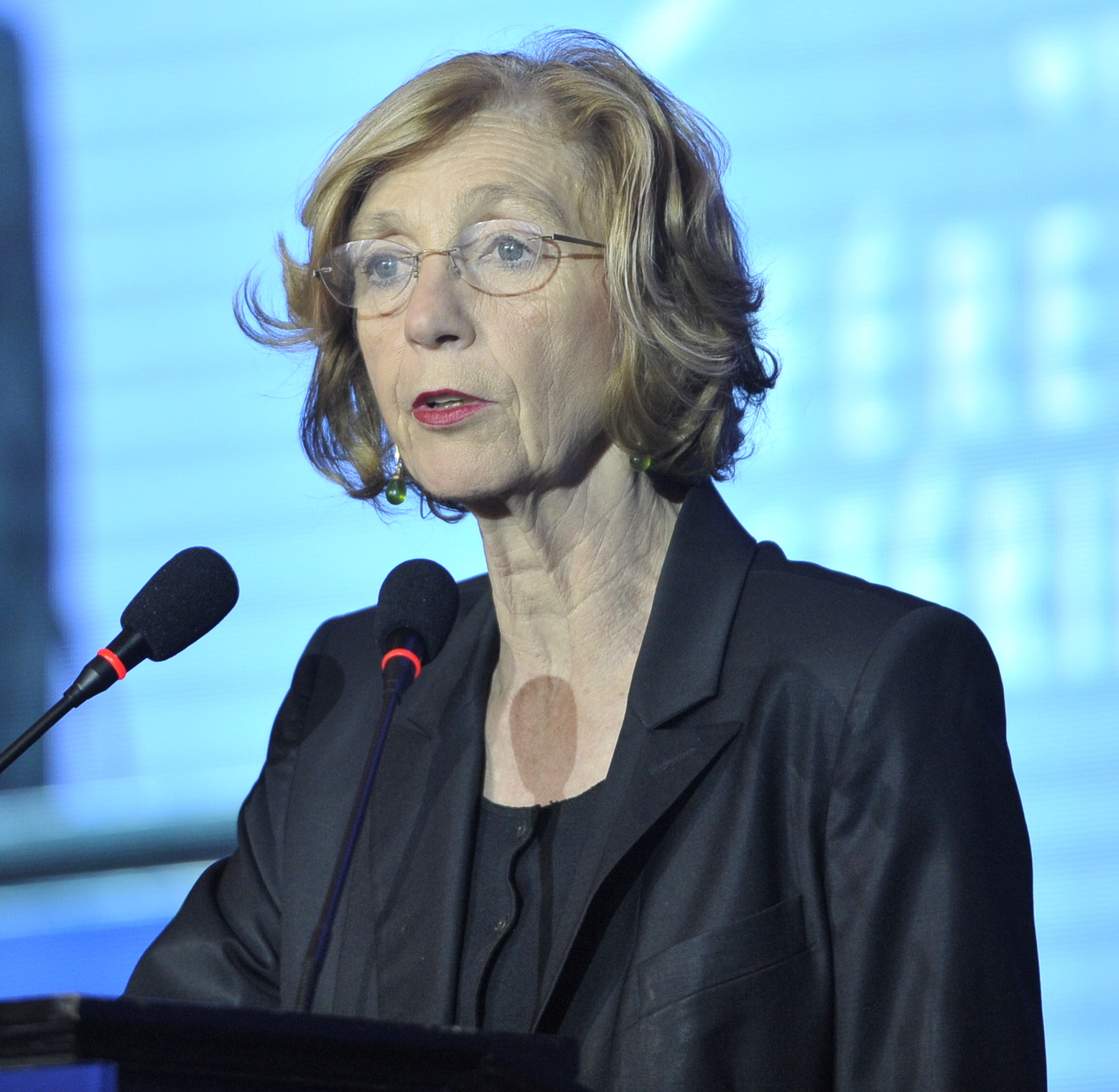
- Bricq in 2013

Minister of Ecology, Sustainable Development and Energy
- In office 16 May 2012 – 21 June 2012
- President: François Hollande
- Prime Minister: Jean-Marc Ayrault
- Preceded by: François Fillon (Minister of Ecology, Sustainable Development, Transport and Housing)
- Succeeded by: Delphine Batho

Member of the National Assembly for Seine-et-Marne's 6th constituency
- In office 12 June 1997 – 16 June 2002
- Preceded by: Pierre Quillet
- Succeeded by: Jean-François Copé

Personal details
- Born: 10 June 1947 La Rochefoucauld, France
- Died: 6 August 2017 (aged 70) Poitiers, France
- Party: Socialist Party (1972–2017); La République En Marche! (2017)
- Education: University of Bordeaux
- Occupation: Politician

Nicole Bricq (French pronunciation: [ni.kɔl bʁik]; 10 June 1947 – 6 August 2017) was a member of the Senate of France, representing the Seine-et-Marne department.

== Early life and education ==
Bricq received a degree in private law from Montesquieu University in 1970.

== Political career ==
From 1972 on Bricq was a member of the Socialist Party.

On 16 May 2012 Bricq was appointed Minister of Ecology, Sustainable Development and Energy in the government of Jean-Marc Ayrault. After the 2012 legislative election, she was appointed Minister for Foreign Trade. She was replaced at the Ministry of Ecology by Delphine Batho. Whereas some members of the government, such as Cécile Duflot, considered this nomination like a promotion, many felt that it was due to the decision taken by Bricq to stop all drilling contracts signed with Shell in French Guiana, a decision that has been reversed since then.

In 2013, Bricq complained in a television interview that President of the European Commission José Manuel Barroso had “done nothing during his term”, suggesting that Barroso’s reappointment in 2009 had been a mistake. She also emerged as a vocal critic of how the European Commission led the negotiations on a Transatlantic Trade and Investment Partnership.

On 11 February 2014, Bricq was among the guests invited to the state dinner hosted by U.S. President Barack Obama in honor of President François Hollande at the White House.

Bricq was one of the earliest supporters of Emmanuel Macron and his party, La République En Marche!, instead of supporting Socialist Party candidate, Benoît Hamon.

== Death ==
On 6 August 2017, Bricq died in hospital in Poitiers after an accidental fall.
