= Jean-François Copé =

French politician (born 1964)

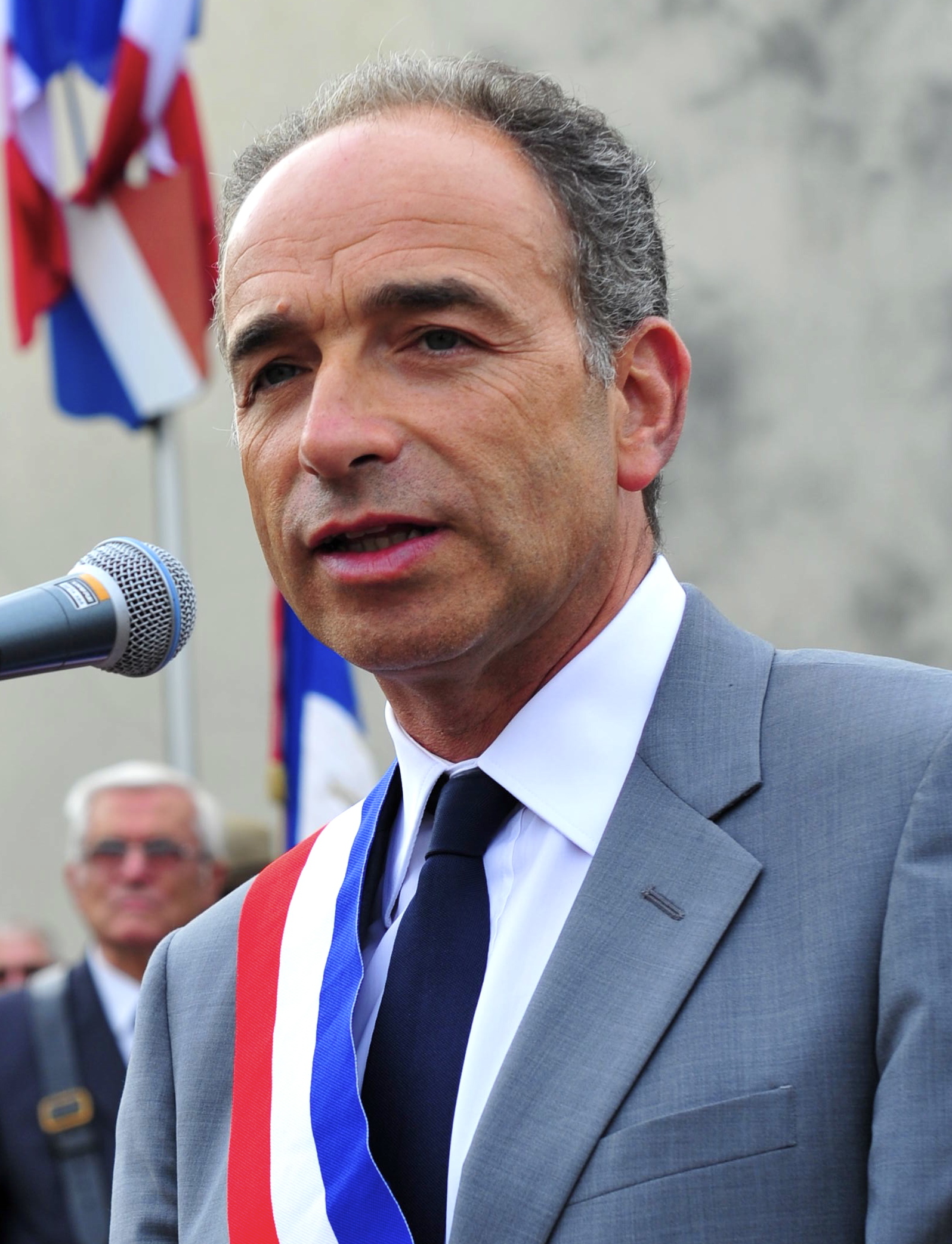
- Copé in 2015

President of the Union for a Popular Movement
- In office 19 November 2012 – 15 June 2014
- Preceded by: Nicolas Sarkozy
- Succeeded by: Interim collegial leadership Alain Juppé; Jean-Pierre Raffarin; François Fillon

Secretary-General of the Union for a Popular Movement
- In office 17 November 2010 – 19 November 2012
- Preceded by: Xavier Bertrand
- Succeeded by: Michèle Tabarot

Mayor of Meaux
- Incumbent
- Assumed office 1 December 2005
- Preceded by: Ange Anziani
- In office 19 June 1995 – 20 June 2002
- Preceded by: Jean Lion
- Succeeded by: Ange Anziani

Minister of the Budget
- In office 31 May 2005 – 18 May 2007
- Prime Minister: Dominique de Villepin
- Preceded by: Dominique Bussereau
- Succeeded by: Éric Woerth

Member of the National Assembly for Seine-et-Marne's 6th constituency
- In office 26 June 2002 – 20 June 2017
- Preceded by: Nicole Bricq
- Succeeded by: Jean-François Parigi

Personal details
- Born: 5 May 1964 (age 62) Boulogne-Billancourt, Seine, (now Hauts-de-Seine), France
- Party: The Republicans (2015–present)
- Other political affiliations: Rally for the Republic (before 2002); Union for a Popular Movement (2002–2015)
- Spouses: Valérie Ducuing (m. 1991; div. 2007) Nadia D'Alincourt (m. 2011)
- Children: 4
- Education: Sciences Po; École nationale d'administration
- Website: Official website

Jean-François Copé (French pronunciation: [ʒɑ̃ fʁɑ̃swa kɔpe]; born 5 May 1964) is a French politician serving as Mayor of Meaux since 1995 with an interruption from 2002 to 2005. He was Government Spokesman between 2002 and 2007, when assumed other tenures in the government—including Minister of the Budget—at the same time. He also served as the member of the National Assembly for the 6th constituency of Seine-et-Marne and president of the Union for a Popular Movement (UMP) group in the National Assembly. In November 2010 he became the party's secretary-general. In August 2012 he announced that he would run for the presidency of the UMP, facing the former Prime Minister François Fillon.

On 19 November 2012 he was elected to the presidency of the UMP with 50.03% of votes from its members, defeating Fillon, who asserted his own victory. He resigned from the post on 27 May 2014 following an invoices scandal and poor results for the UMP at the 2014 European elections.

== Personal life ==
Jean-François Copé was born in Boulogne-Billancourt, Seine, (now Hauts-de-Seine) the son of Professor Roland Copé, a surgeon of Romanian Jewish origin, and Monique Ghanassia, of Algerian Jewish origin. His paternal grandparents were Marcu Hirs Copelovici, a physician born in Iaşi (Romania), and Gisele Lazerovici. His maternal grandparents were Ismael André Ghanassia, a lawyer in Algiers (son of Moïse Ghanassia and Djouhar Soussi, from Miliana, in Algeria), and Lise Boukhabza (granddaughter of a Tunisian rabbi).

Raised in a French Jewish family, he describes himself as "a non-practising Jew" ("Juif non-pratiquant"). He studied at the École Active Bilingue Jeannine Manuel, and then at Lycée Victor Duruy, where he obtained his Baccalauréat. In 1985, he graduated from Sciences Po, and following military service, he entered the École nationale d'administration, from which he graduated in 1989. He followed training seminars on New Public Management in the United States, and he is a proponent of benchmarking on budget matters. Divorced, he has four children, François-Xavier, Pierre-Alexis, and Raphaëlla, from his previous marriage, and Faustine, from his current union.

== Career ==
Following his graduation in 1989, he joined the Caisse des dépôts et consignations until 1991. He then worked as head of cabinet for the CEO at Dexia, while teaching Local Economy and Finance at Science-Po. He left those attributions in 1993 to get involved in the leading right-wing party at the time, the RPR.

In 1997 he came back to teaching as an Associate Professor of Economy and Finance at Paris 8 University, up until 2002. He also returned to the Caisse des dépôts et consignations between 1997 and 1999, before joining the supervisory board of Dexia from 2000 to 2002.

== Political functions ==
After serving in various political roles in the RPR and the Balladur government, he became spokesperson for the government of Prime Minister Jean-Pierre Raffarin in 2002. On 24 November 2004, he became Minister of Budget and spokesperson for the government in the Raffarin III government; he was reappointed to this function in the following Villepin government. Following the 2007 parliamentary election, he became leader of the UMP parliamentary group in the 13th Legislature.

In 1995, he became Mayor of Meaux at 35, and was re-elected in 2001 and 2008. Because of his nomination in the government in 2002, he had to step down in favour of Ange Anziani. Nonetheless, he regained the office in 2005 following Anziani's resignation. He was also regional councillor of Ile-de-France from 1998 to 2007 and was list leader of the UMP-UDF in Ile-de-France in the 2004 regional elections.

He became deputy of the 5th constituency of Seine-et-Marne in 1995, following the nomination of the incumbent to the Juppé government. However, he was defeated in 1997 by a Socialist candidate in a difficult RPR-PS-FN three-way second round race. In 2002, he was elected in the 6th constituency. He was re-elected there by the first round in 2007, becoming President of the UMP Group in the French National Assembly at the same time.

In November 2010, he became General Secretary of the Union for a Popular Movement. He declared himself a candidate for the presidency of the UMP in August 2012, facing François Fillon, Nathalie Kosciusko-Morizet and Bruno Le Maire. He was supported by many strong UMP members, such as former Prime Minister Jean-Pierre Raffarin, UMP leader at the National Assembly Christian Jacob and former Minister of Education Luc Chatel.

In September 2012, Copé denounced the development of an anti-White racism by people living in France, sparking a nationwide controversy in media and politics.

On 19 November 2012, Copé declared himself winner of the Union for a Popular Movement leadership election with 50,03% of votes, an assertion that was contradicted by François Fillon who asserted his own victory. In the following days, the crisis amplified with a mutual accusation of fraud.

On 27 February 2014 Le Point magazine accused Copé of using a friend's company as contractor for UMP's events organisation, and overpaying it. Copé rejected the charges, accused the magazine's editor of persecution and sued him. Following UMP's poor results in the 2014 European elections and accusations linked with the Bygmalion invoices scandal, Copé was forced to resign as UMP chairman on 27 May 2014. However, Copé was eventually cleared of all wrongdoing by the justice.

A candidate to the 2016 Republican primary, Copé ended last with only 0.3%. He supported Alain Juppé against his former rival François Fillon in the second ballot.

In June 2024, the Paris prosecutor's office opened an investigation against Copé, concerning the use of municipal vehicles for purposes beyond his duties as mayor of Meaux. This investigation followed a report from the anti-corruption association Anticor, in February 2023, for alleged acts of "embezzlement of public funds".

In the Republicans' 2025 leadership election, Copé endorsed Bruno Retailleau to succeed Éric Ciotti as the party's new chair.

== Political career ==
Governmental functions

- Secretary of State for Relationships with Parliament and Government's spokesman: 2002–2004.
- Minister delegated to Interior and Government's spokesman: March–November 2004.
- Minister of Budget, Budget Reform and Government's spokesman: 2004–2005.
- Minister of Budget, State Reform and Government's spokesman: 2005–2007.

Electoral mandates

=== National Assembly of France ===
- President of the Union for a Popular Movement Group in the National Assembly: 2007–2010 (Resignation).
- Member of the National Assembly of France for Seine-et-Marne (5th, then 6th constituency): 1995–1997 / Reelected in 2002, but he became secretary of State / Since 2007. Elected in 1995, reelected in 2002, 2007, 2012.

=== Regional Council ===
- Regional councillor of Île-de-France: 1998–2007 (Resignation). Reelected in 2004.

=== Municipal Council ===
- Mayor of Meaux: 1995–2002 (Resignation) / Since 2005. Reelected in 2001, 2005, 2008.
- Deputy-mayor of Meaux: 2002–2005.
- Municipal councillor of Meaux: Since 1995. Reelected in 2001, 2008.

=== Agglomeration community Council ===
- Président of the Communauté d'agglomération du Pays de Meaux: Since 2003. Reelected in 2008.
- Member of the Communauté d'agglomération du Pays de Meaux: Since 2003. Reelected in 2008.

=== Political functions ===
- Deputy General secretary of the Rally for the Republic: 2001–2002.
- General Secretary of the Union for a Popular Movement: 2010-2012.
- Président of the Union for a Popular Movement: 2012-2014.

== Bibliography ==
=== Books by Jean-François Copé ===
- 1990 : Finances locales – Economica (Reissued in 1993 (ISBN 978-2717825688), and with François Werner in 1997 (ISBN 978-2717833034))
- 1999 : Ce que je n'ai pas appris à l'ENA. L'aventure d'un maire – Hachette Littératures. ISBN 978-2-01-235477-7.
- 2002 : Devoir d'inventaire. Le dépôt de bilan de Lionel Jospin – Éditions Albin Michel. ISBN 978-2-226-13314-4.
- 2006 : Promis, j'arrête la langue de bois – Hachette Littératures. ISBN 978-2-01-235943-7.
- 2012 : Manifeste pour une droite décomplexée - Editions Fayard. ISBN 978-2213671796

Political offices
Preceded by Jean Lion	Mayor of Meaux; 1995–2002	Succeeded by Ange Anziani
Preceded by Dominique Bussereau	Minister of the Budget; 2005–2007	Succeeded by Éric Woerth
Preceded by Ange Anziani	Mayor of Meaux; 2005–present	Incumbent
Party political offices
Preceded by Xavier Bertrand	Secretary-General of the Union for a Popular Movement; 2010–2012	Succeeded by Jean-Claude Gaudin; Acting
Preceded by Jean-François Copé as Secretary-General of the UMP	Leader of the Union for a Popular Movement; 2012–2014	Succeeded by Alain Juppé, Jean-Pierre Raffarin, François Fillon interim collegial leadership
