= Seine-et-Marne's 6th constituency =

Constituency of the National Assembly of France

6th constituency of Seine-et-Marne
- inline Constituency of the National Assembly of France

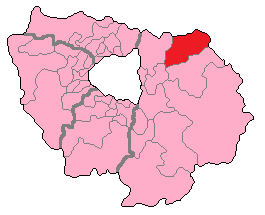
- Seine-et-Marne's 6th Constituency shown within Île-de-France
- Deputy: Béatrice Roullaud; RN
- Department: Seine-et-Marne
- Cantons: Lizy-sur-Ourcq, Meaux-Nord, Meaux-Sud, Dammartin-en-Goële (part)
- Registered voters: 74,055

The 6th constituency of Seine-et-Marne is a French legislative constituency in the Seine-et-Marne département.

== Description ==
The 6th constituency of Seine-et-Marne lies in the north of the department around the town of Meaux.

In the 1980s and 1990s the seat swung between left and right; however, since 2002 the seat has remained comfortably in the hands of Jean-François Copé of the UMP. Copé served as a minister under Nicolas Sarkozy and as president of the UMP between 2012 and 2014.

== Historic Representation ==
Election	Member	Party
1986	Proportional representation – no election by constituency	
1988	Robert Le Foll	PS
1993	Pierre Quillet	RPR
1997	Nicole Bricq	PS
2002	Jean-François Copé	UMP
2007	Jean-François Copé	UMP
2012	Jean-François Copé	UMP
2017	Jean-François Parigi	LR
2021	Bernadette Beauvais	LR
2022	Béatrice Roullaud	RN

== Election results ==
=== 2024 ===
Candidate	Party	Alliance	First round			Second round		
Candidate	Party	Alliance	Votes	%	+/–	Votes	%	+/–
Béatrice Roullaud	RN		20,994	40.81	+13.84	24,362	52.50	+0.37
Amal Bentounsi	LFI	NFP	15,548	30.22	-0.34	22,041	47.50	-0.37
Régis Sarazin	LR		13,739	26.70	+11.96	WITHDREW		
Annie Rieupet	LO		1,167	2.27	+1.17			
Valid votes			51,448	97.24	-0.35	46,403	89.17	+0.52
Blank votes			1,116	2.11	+0.21	4,606	8.85	-0.42
Null votes			346	0.65	+0.14	1,027	1.97	-0.10
Turnout			52,910	63.82	+21.69	52,036	62.75	+21.90
Abstentions			29,994	36.18	-21.69	30,885	37.25	-21.90
Registered voters			82,904			82,921		
Source: Ministry of the Interior, Le Monde
Result						RN HOLD		

=== 2022 ===
Legislative Election 2022: Seine-et-Marne's 6th constituency
Party	Candidate	Votes	%	±%
RN	Béatrice Roullaud	9,044	26.97	+8.01
LFI (NUPÉS)	Valérie Delage	8,986	26.80	+5.80
Agir (Ensemble)	Fatna Mekidiche	5,976	17.82	−12.51
LR (UDC)	Hamida Rezeg	4,943	14.72	−9.16
REC	Claire Murcia	1,667	4.97	N/A
FGR	Nathalie Moine	1,262	3.76	N/A
Others	N/A	1,656	4.94	
Turnout		33,534	42.13	−1.34
2nd round result
RN	Béatrice Roullaud	15,399	52.12	
LFI (NUPÉS)	Valérie Delage	14,144	47.88	
Turnout		29,543	40.85	+7.48
RN gain from LR				

=== 2017 ===
Legislative Election 2017: Seine-et-Marne's 6th constituency
Party	Candidate	Votes	%	±%
LREM	Laëtitia Martig-Deces	10,298	30.33	
LR	Jean-François Parigi	8,115	23.90	
FN	Béatrice Roullaud	6,437	18.96	
LFI	Valérie Delage	4,898	14.42	
EELV	Séverine Lecleqcq	1,170	3.45	
PS	Martial Souverain	1,064	3.13	
DLF	Vincent Morelle	754	2.22	
Others	N/A	1,222		
Turnout		33,958	43.47	
2nd round result
LR	Jean-François Parigi	14,397	55.22	
LREM	Laëtitia Martig-Deces	11,673	44.78	
Turnout		26,070	33.37	
LR hold				

=== 2012 ===
Legislative Election 2012: Seine-et-Marne's 6th constituency
Party	Candidate	Votes	%	±%
UMP	Jean-François Copé	19,604	45.14	
EELV	Caroline Pinet	12,586	28.98	
FN	Marie-Christine Arnautu	6,906	15.90	
FG	Guillaume Quercy	2,847	6.55	
Others	N/A	1,491		
Turnout		43,909	59.29	
2nd round result
UMP	Jean-François Copé	24,178	59.53	
EELV	Caroline Pinet	16,437	40.47	
Turnout		41,790	56.43	
UMP hold				

=== 2007 ===
Legislative Election 2007: Seine-et-Marne's 6th constituency
Party	Candidate	Votes	%	±%
UMP	Jean-François Copé	25,489	54.26	
PS	Monique Papin	8,839	18.82	
PCF	Jean-Pierre Bontoux	3,711	7.90	
MoDem	Yannick Peran	2,721	5.79	
FN	Marie-Christine Arnautu	2,642	5.62	
LV	Julie Nouvoin	948	2.02	
Others	N/A	2,625		
Turnout		47,562	58.14	
UMP hold				

=== 2002 ===
Legislative Election 2002: Seine-et-Marne's 6th constituency
Party	Candidate	Votes	%	±%
UMP	Jean-François Copé	20,243	43.98	
PS	Nicole Bricq	12,226	26.56	
FN	Marie-Christine Arnautu	7,251	15.75	
PCF	Jean-Pierre Bontoux	3,097	6.73	
Others	N/A	3,214		
Turnout		46,764	62.90	
2nd round result
UMP	Jean-François Copé	24,339	59.02	
PS	Nicole Bricq	16,898	40.98	
Turnout		42,835	57.62	
UMP gain from PS				

=== 1997 ===
Legislative Election 1997: Seine-et-Marne's 6th constituency
Party	Candidate	Votes	%	±%
RPR	Jean-François Copé	13,028	28.72	
PS	Nicole Bricq	10,339	22.79	
FN	Marie-Christine Arnautu	9,800	21.60	
PCF	Jean-Pierre Bontoux	6,716	14.81	
DIV	Alexandre Figour	2,592	5.71	
LO	Georges Millot	1,571	3.46	
DVD	Bernard Chalumeau	1,109	2.44	
PRG	Khoudir Khaldi	207	0.46	
Turnout		47,220	67.35	
2nd round result
PS	Nicole Bricq	21,720	44.09	
RPR	Jean-François Copé	20,066	40.73	
FN	Marie-Christine Arnautu	7,478	15.18	
Turnout		50,721	72.35	
PS gain from RPR				

== Sources ==
Official results of French elections from 2002: "Résultats électoraux officiels en France" (in French).
