= Ersilia Soudais =

French politician (born 1988)

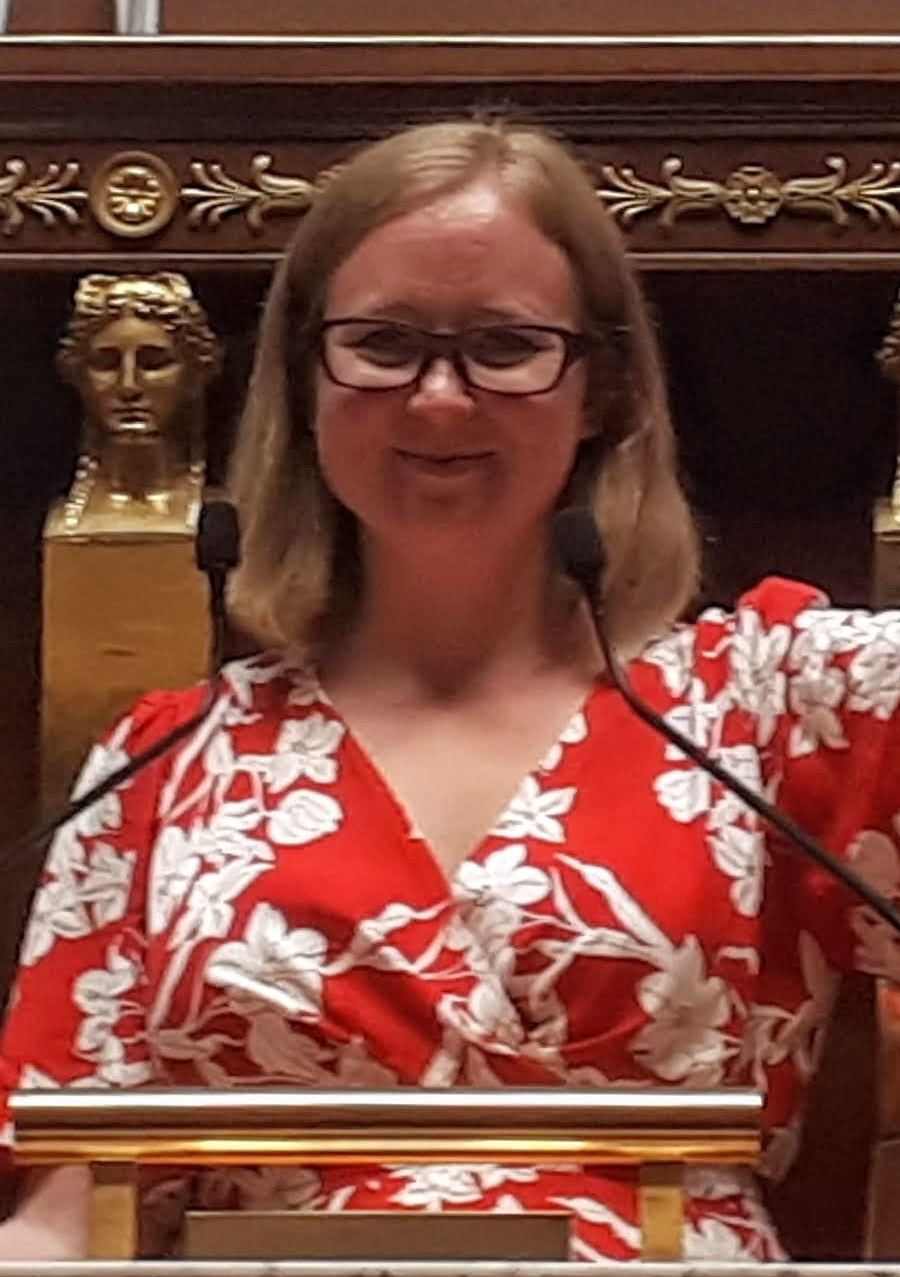
- Soudais in 2022

Member of the National Assembly for Seine-et-Marne's 7th constituency
- Incumbent
- Assumed office 22 June 2022
- Preceded by: Rodrigue Kokouendo

Personal details
- Born: 21 May 1988 (age 38) Aubervilliers, France
- Party: La France Insoumise

Ersilia Soudais (born 21 May 1988) is a French politician from La France Insoumise. She was elected as the Member of Parliament for Seine-et-Marne's 7th constituency in the 2022 French legislative election.

== Biography ==
=== Family, education and career ===
Born in Aubervilliers, in Seine-Saint-Denis, Ersilia Soudais grew up in a very political family. Her father, Michel Soudais, a journalist, was an editor in chief of Politis, a weekly publication of the anti-liberal left.

After a classe préparatoire and literature studies, she taught French at Sevran in Seine-Saint-Denis for a year, before returning to Seine-et-Marne and getting involved with the SNES-FSU.

=== Political career ===
A feminist activist, she was elected as a municipal councillor of the opposition in Lagny-sur-Marne in 2020, she became known during local struggles against substandard housing in the area.

As a member of La France insoumise, she was elected as a deputy on 19 June 2022 in Seine-et-Marne's seventh constituency.

During the 2024 legislative elections, as a candidate from La France insoumise/Nouveau Front populaire (New Popular Front) in the same constituency of Seine-et-Marne, she received 32,79 % of the vote in the first round, behind the candidate for the far-right Rassemblement national (National Rally), Agnès Laffite, who obtained 35,72 % of the vote. They were they only ones to qualify for the second round, where she was reelected with 53% of the vote.

In April 2025, Bruno Retailleau took legal action against Ritchy Thibault, an associate of Ersilia Soudais, due to calls for 'insurrection' during a rally in Paris against islamophobia. The latter had called for 'the construction of popular self defence brigades throughout the country' to protect against islamophobia. Ritchy Thibault is already under summons in connection with another case after he called for 'the overwhelming of the police' during a rally on 1 May in the capital. He is forbidden to enter the National Assembly.

=== Private life and court cases ===
On 2 March 2024, Ersilia Soudais filed a complaint for marital rape against her partner Damien Cassé, also a member of LFI; a on-the-spot investigation was launched by the Meaux prosecutor's office. Following the referral by the deputy to the comité de suivi contre les violences sexistes et sexuelles de La France insoumise (La France Insoumise's monitoring committee against sexist and sexual violence), the activist was excluded from LFI 'as a precautionary measure'. Damien Cassé denies these accusations. The rape complaint was closed. Damien Cassé will be tried for moral harassment.

She filed a complaint in 2025 after having been the target of several death threats. She filed another complaint against the French-Israeli novelist Marco Koskas who called for someone to 'shoot a bullet in the head of Mrs Soudais, Mr Coquerel and all mélenchonie'.

== Positions and controversies ==
According to the weekly publication Franc-Tireur, Ersilia Soudais attracted attention for 'a series of incitements and provocations, in the Hemicycle and in the commission'. When the National Assembly proposed to add the Wagner Group to the list of terrorist organisations, she accused France of using this proposition to "shirk responsibility for the use of violence and force"

According to Le Figaro, her controversial declarations have often led to her being labelled as antisemitic by her critics. She was described by that same publication as "a deputy used to controversies" She is also the target of sometimes violent ridicule of her words, her legislative propositions, and even her appearance. According to Le Journal, 'the young LFI activist is characterised more by her summary provocations than by her knowledge of issues'.

=== Support of Palestine ===
She began to be interested in the Palestinian cause during the legislative election campaign in 2022, after a film screening and debate dedicated to Salah Hamouri: "I was extremely moved and threw myself into the topic wholeheartedly." According to Franc-Tireur, "[she] is above all exemplified by one obsessive cause : antizionism". Thus, she supports a communist resolution project which intends to apply the term 'apartheid' to Israël, in the name of the 'two state solution'. She also commemorated '75 years of nakba' ('catastrophe' in Arabic), a term describing the exile of 700, 000 Palestinians driven from their lands by the Israeli Declaration of Independence. Alongside anti-zionist groups, she supports the movement Boycott, Divestment and Sanctions (BDS) which fights for economic and political blockades against Israel.

Known for her pro-Palestine positions, Soudais was behind, in November 2023, the invitation of a Palestinian activist, Maryam Abu Daqqa, to the National Assembly. Abu Daqqa is one of the leaders of the Popular Front for the Liberation of Palestine (FPLP) - an organisation designated as a terrorist group by the European Union. This invitation was rejected by the president, Yaël Braun-Pivet. Afterwards, video material in which Ersilia Soudais remarked on this invitation attracted criticism. She claimed that she was 'harassed when a photo of Kfir Bibas, an Israeli infant kidnapped on 7 October 2023, was posted on the door of her office at the National Assembly.

Ersilia Soudais was one of the LFI deputies accused of antisemitism and of not having condemned the October 7 attacks, refusing to classify it as 'an antisemitic terrorist attack'. She has always denied any claims of antisemitism in her speeches and maintains her critiques of zionism and her opposition to the State of Israel.

In early February 2025, Frédéric Falcon, an RN deputy, referred to her as 'a notorious anti-semite' during a session at the National Assembly. Ersilia Soudais asked for him to be sanctioned for these remarks, which Falcon accepted. These remarks were the object of a reminder of the rules by the president of the session, who referred the matter to the Office of the National Assembly.

=== Accusation against her head of communications of cyberbullying ===
In August 2024, she posted a video on TikTok, which was intended to be humorous, about the behaviour of her head of communications, Mathieu Garnier, portraying him as a 'harasser of journalists'. In response, the journalist and editor in chief at Décideurs Magazine, Lucas Jakubowicz, accused Mathieu Garnier of harassment and shared critical messages sent to him by Garnier, accusing him of 'making fun' of his family, who were victims of the Holocaust, for having described Jakubowicz as supporting Marine Le Pen and for the following statement: 'The guy, he talks about his family that was decimated by the Nazis during the Second World War... just before calling to march with them'; Ersilia Soudais has not responded to these accusations.

=== Support of Elias d’Imzalène ===
On 8 September 2024, the political activist Elias d’Imzalène under an fiche S (S file) by the renseignements généraux (French intelligence services) was taken into custody as part of an investigation initiated by a report from the ex-minister of the interior Gérald Darmanin. The report accused him of inciting hatred, after he asked his audience at a protest if they were 'ready to carry out Intifada in Paris' in order to 'liberate Jerusalem'. On 25 September 2024, Ersilia Soudais said she wanted to visit, as an elected official, the police station where he was being held in custody to support him, lamenting that it was not the supporters of the 'genocide perpetrated by Israel' who were in custody instead.

At trial, Elias d'Imzalène, who denies any claim of antisemitism, was sentenced in December 2024 to a suspended sentence with the payment of damages for 'public incitation of hatred relating to ethnicity, race, origin, nationality or religion'.

== See also ==
- List of deputies of the 16th National Assembly of France
- List of deputies of the 17th National Assembly of France
