= Bernadette Beauvais =

French politician (born 1949)

Member of the National Assembly for Seine-et-Marne's 6th constituency
- In office 28 July 2021 – 25 August 2021
- Preceded by: Jean-François Parigi
- Succeeded by: Béatrice Roullaud

Mayor of Étrépilly
- Incumbent
- Assumed office 23 May 2020
- Preceded by: Josiane Calderoni

Personal details
- Born: 18 June 1949 (age 76) Moissy-Cramayel, France

Bernadette Beauvais (born 18 June 1949) is a French politician who represented the 6th constituency of the Seine-et-Marne department in the National Assembly for less than a month in 2021.

Following the resignation of Jean-François Parigi of The Republicans, of whom she was the substitute, she resigned in turn from Parliament, opting to continue serving as Mayor of Étrépilly instead.
