= Jean-François Parigi =

French politician

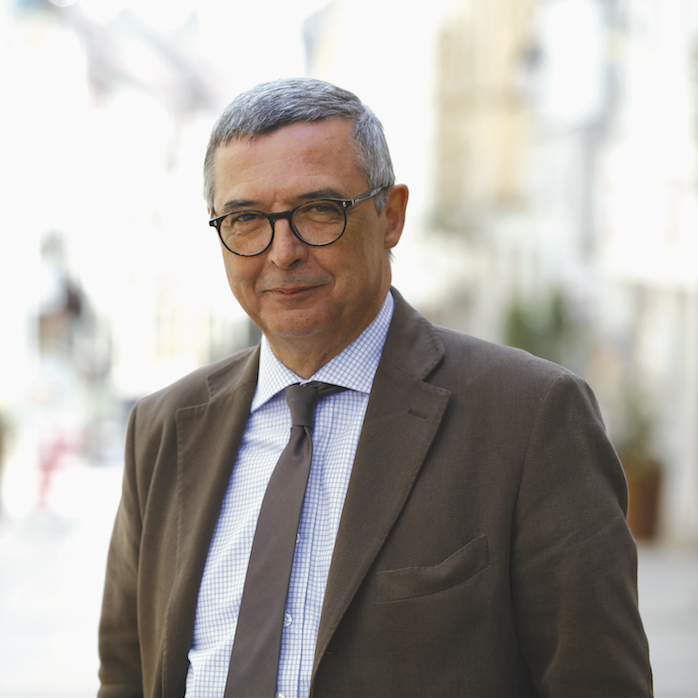
- Jean-François Parigi in 2018

Member of the National Assembly for Seine-et-Marne's 6th constituency
- In office 21 June 2017 – 27 July 2021
- Preceded by: Jean-François Copé
- Succeeded by: Bernadette Beauvais

Member of the Municipal council of Meaux
- Incumbent
- Assumed office 24 June 1995
- Mayor: Jean-François Copé

Personal details
- Born: 25 January 1960 (age 65); Châtenay-Malabry, France
- Political party: The Republicans
- Profession: Banker

Jean-François Parigi (born 25 January 1960) is a French politician for The Republicans who served as the member of the National Assembly for Seine-et-Marne's 6th constituency from 2017 to 2021.

During the 2021 departmental elections in Seine-et-Marne, Jean-François Parigi was elected on June 27, 2021 departmental councilor of the canton of Meaux then president of the departmental council of Seine-et-Marne on July 1 ^{,} 2021, which is incompatible with his mandate as a Member of Parliament pursuant to the legislation limiting the accumulation of mandates in France . He favors his departmental mandate, leaving his deputy seat vacant, because his deputy, Bernadette Beauvais, mayor ( DVD ) of the commune of Étrépilly, wishes to keep his municipal mandate and the organization of partial legislative elections is not possible. one year before the next general renewal in 2022 .
