= Étrépilly, Seine-et-Marne =

Étrépilly
- Commune
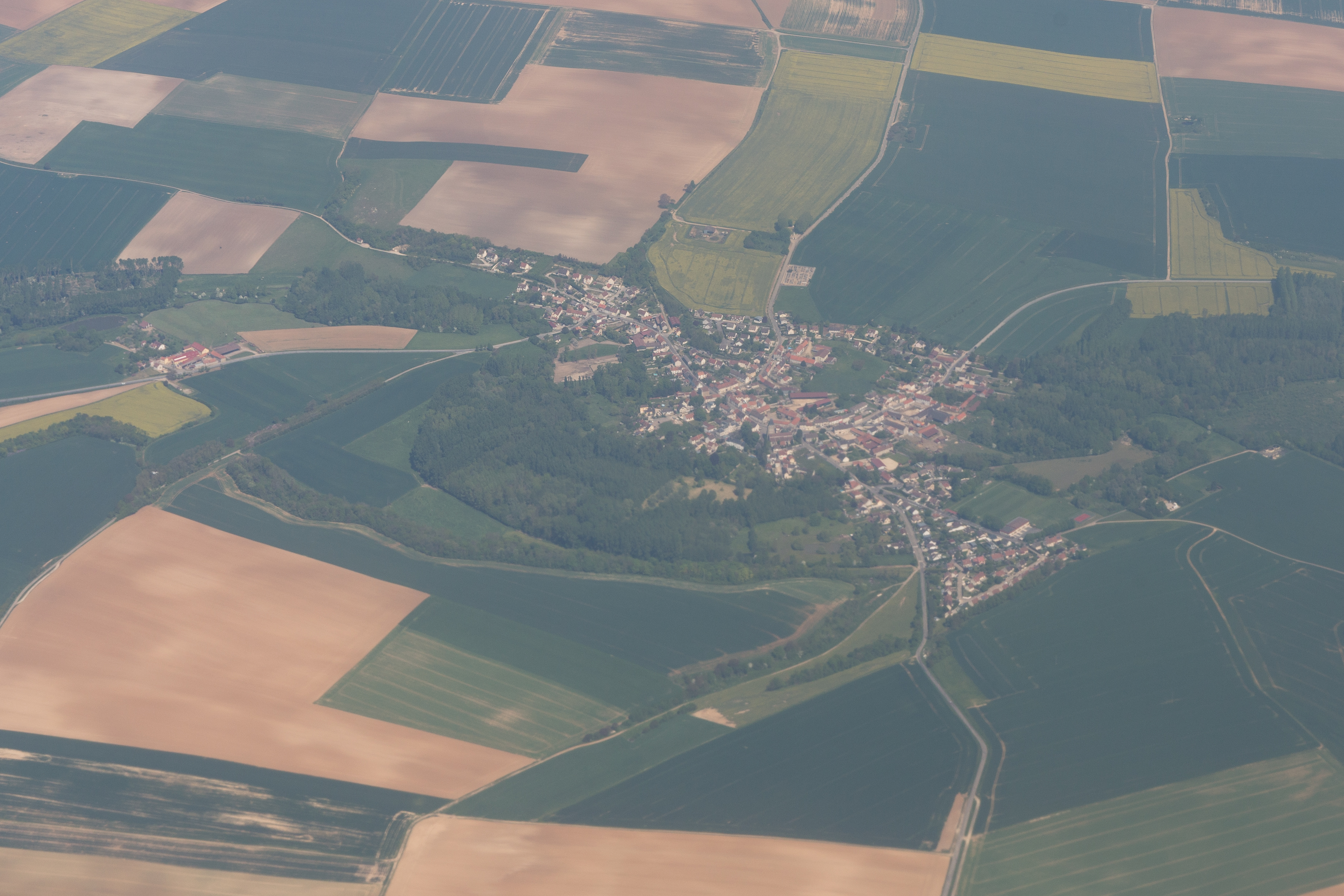
- Aerial view (2018)
- Location of Étrépilly
- Location within France Location within Île-de-France (region)
- Coordinates: 49°02′10″N 2°55′55″E
- Country: France
- Region: Île-de-France
- Department: Seine-et-Marne
- Arrondissement: Meaux
- Canton: La Ferté-sous-Jouarre
- Intercommunality: Pays de l'Ourcq

Government
  - Mayor (2021–2026): Bernadette Beauvais
- Area^{1}: 13.18 km^{2} (5.09 sq mi)
- Highest elevation: 140 m (460 ft)
- Lowest elevation: 66 m (217 ft)
- Population (2023): 805
  - Density: 61.1/km^{2} (158/sq mi)
- Time zone: UTC+01:00 (CET)
  - Summer (DST): UTC+02:00 (CEST)
- INSEE/Postal code: 77173 /77139
- ^{1} French Land Register data, which excludes lakes, ponds, glaciers > 1 km^{2} (0.386 sq mi or 247 acres) and river estuaries.

Étrépilly (French pronunciation: [etʁepiji]) is a commune in the Seine-et-Marne department in the Île-de-France region in north-central France.

== Demographics ==
Inhabitants of Étrépilly are called Étrépillois.

== See also ==
- Communes of the Seine-et-Marne department
