= Eduardo Rihan Cypel =

French politician (born 1975)

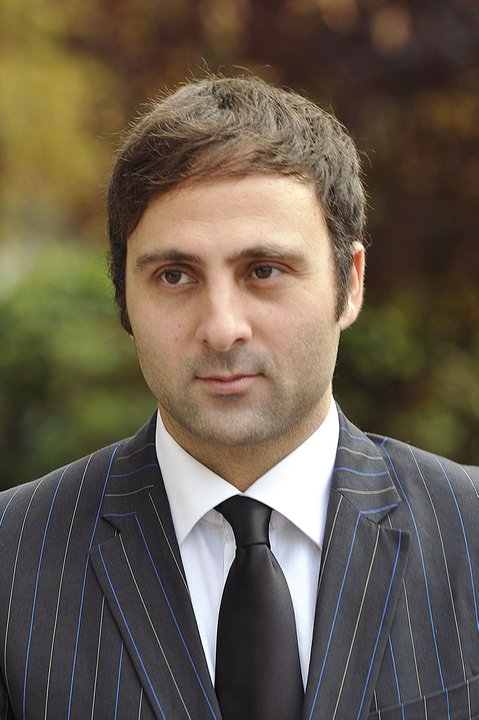
- Rihan Cypel in 2011

Member of the French National Assembly for Seine-et-Marne's 8th constituency
- In office 20 June 2012 – 20 June 2017
- Preceded by: Chantal Brunel
- Succeeded by: Jean-Michel Fauvergue

Personal details
- Born: 13 November 1975 (age 50)
- Party: Socialist Party

Eduardo Rihan Cypel (born 13 November 1975) is a Brazilian-born French politician. From 2012 to 2017, he was a member of the National Assembly. From 2010 to 2012, he was a member of the Regional Council of Île-de-France.
