= Yves Albarello =

French politician (born 1952)

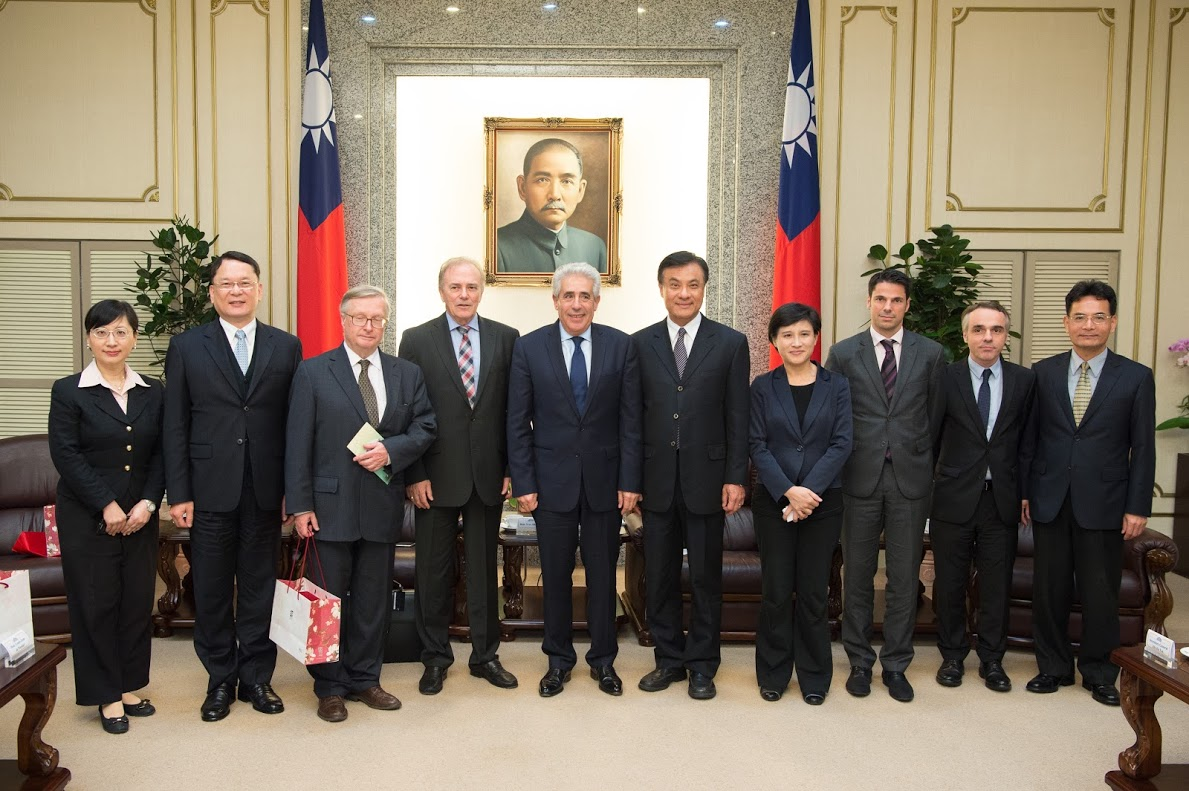
- Yves Albarello, center, during his visit to the Legislative Yuan in Taipei, Taiwan on 13 April 2016.

Member of the National Assembly for Seine-et-Marne's 7th constituency
- In office 20 June 2007 – 20 June 2017
- Preceded by: Charles Cova
- Succeeded by: Rodrigue Kokouendo

Mayor of Claye-Souilly
- In office 1989–2020
- Preceded by: Bernard Letellier
- Succeeded by: Jean-Luc Servières

Personal details
- Born: 17 March 1952 (age 74) Aulnay-sous-Bois, France
- Party: UMP

Yves Albarello (born 17 March 1952, in Aulnay-sous-Bois, Seine-et-Oise) was the member of the National Assembly of France for Seine-et-Marne's 7th constituency from 2007 to 2017. He is of Italian origin and is a member of the Union for a Popular Movement. His political career began in 1976 with the creation of the Rally for the Republic.

An entrepreneur in the graphical sector and financial director by profession, Albarello was elected mayor of Claye-Souilly for the first time in 1989 with 49% of votes. He was subsequently re-elected in 1995, and in 2002 with 78% of the vote.

In 1996, he was awarded the Marianne d'Or for his action in the campaign against AIDS.

In 1998, he was elected regional councillor for the Île-de-France, teller for the UMP on environmental questions and re-elected in 2004.

As the second of Charles Cova, deputy for Seine-et-Marne's 7th constituency in the National Assembly, Albarello was officially welcomed into the party in October 2006 and part of the candidature from legislative elections in 2007. He was elected as a deputy on the 17 Juin 2007 against Emeric Brehier, the Socialist candidate, with more than 55% of the vote. His second then was Claudine Thomas, regional adviser of Île-de-France since 2010.

He was also the departmental treasurer for the UMP in Seine-et-Marne and national secretary in charge of the service industry.

On 15 November 2004, he was elevated to the level of Knight in the National Order of Merit.
