= Aude Luquet =

French politician (born 1967)

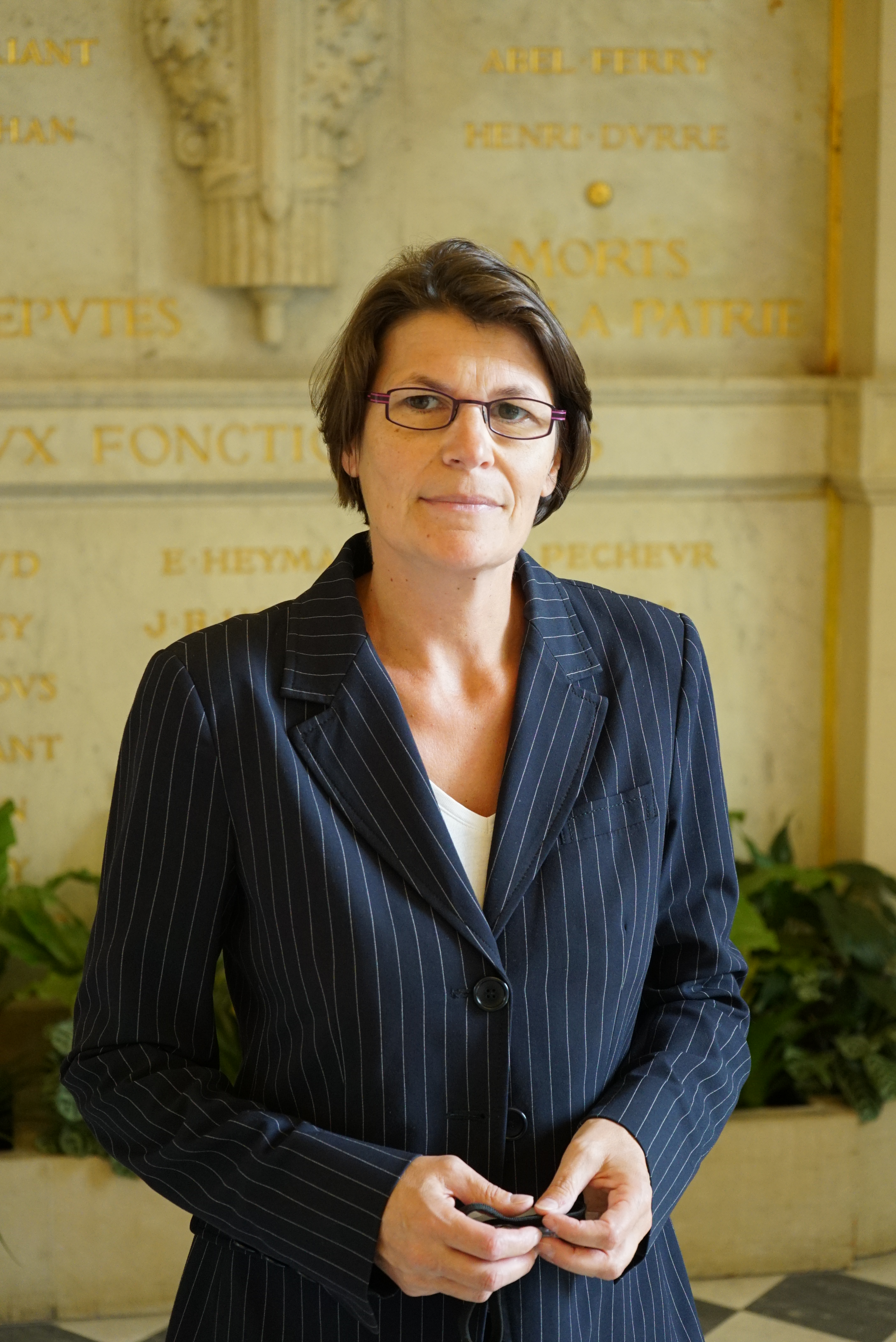
- Aude Luquet (2017)

Member of the National Assembly for Seine-et-Marne's 1st constituency
- Incumbent
- Assumed office 21 June 2017
- Preceded by: Jean-Claude Mignon

Personal details
- Born: 18 August 1967 (age 58) Melun, France
- Party: MoDem

Aude Luquet (born 18 August 1967) is a French politician representing the Democratic Movement. She was elected to the French National Assembly on 18 June 2017, representing the department of Seine-et-Marne.

Luquet was a councilor in Melun commune before her election to the assembly.

== Biography ==
Aude Luquet served as chief of staff and communications director at the town hall of Le Mée-sur-Seine before taking over as chief of staff and communications director for the Community of Municipalities of the Fontainebleau Region and the City of Avon. At the same time, she was elected Deputy Mayor of Mée-sur-Seine in charge of Local Democracy and Community Councilor for the Melun Val de Seine urban area. In 2008, Aude Luquet was elected Regional Councilor for Île-de-France and Municipal Councilor in Melun. She continued her local involvement with the Vallées et Châteaux community of municipalities, first as chief of staff and communications director, then as director general of services for the Brie des Rivières et Châteaux community of municipalities until the 2017 legislative elections, which she won for the Democratic Movement (France) in the 1st district of Seine-et-Marne.

During the 2024 legislative elections, with only 159 votes separating the New Popular Front and the LR-RN alliance, Aude Luquet also declared that she would remain in the race: "There may be instructions from the majority, but we also have our discussions within the Democratic Movement. I am in third place, of course, but we are not far apart." She was defeated in a three-way race by Arnaud Saint-Martin.

Following this defeat, in January 2025, she was appointed interministerial coordinator for gender equality in overseas territories, despite having no direct connection to these territories. She reportedly has “family in New Caledonia” and “denies any political intervention or reappointment”.
