= Elias d'Imzalène =

French activist and influencer (born 1979)

Elias d'Imzalène, born El Yess Zareli on February 22, 1979, in Versailles, Yvelines, France, is a French Muslim influencer and identitarian activist. He first gained public attention in 2013 through his community website Islam & Info, where he published content challenging mainstream media narratives during the Trappes riots. He holds a background in legal studies and has been described as advocating for a distinct Muslim "counter-society" in France while fighting what he defines as Islamophobia.

== Early life and education ==
D'Imzalène was born on 22 February 1979 in Versailles, Yvelines. He pursued legal studies, which gave him a background in law. He is married; his wife was once involved with an association advocating for the wearing of the full-face veil.

== Islam & Info platform ==
In 2011, d'Imzalène launched Islam & Info, a community news site with the motto "Info by the Muslim, for the Muslim". The platform encouraged French Muslims to organise as a distinct community and frequently denounced what it described as systemic Islamophobia. It gained significant visibility in 2013 when d'Imzalène published an interview and video during the Trappes riots that received over 700,000 views. At the time, he was associated with circles close to Dieudonné and Alain Soral. In the following years, the site opposed the 2013 same-sex marriage law and supported the 2014 "Journées de retrait" against gender theory in schools. Following the November 2015 Paris attacks, his home was searched by police and a copy of Mein Kampf was reportedly found. In 2017 he was convicted of defamation related to moderation on the site. Islam & Info became dormant by 2023.

== Perspectives musulmanes ==
In response to the 2021 law “reinforcing respect for the principles of the Republic”, d'Imzalène helped transform the “November 10 Committee” into the collective Perspectives musulmanes, which he leads. The group aims to defend Muslim lifestyles and visible religious expressions. He participated in a 2022 conference at the European Parliament criticising the French law. From 2022 onwards, d'Imzalène moved closer to La France Insoumise (LFI). He took part in rallies supporting figures such as Imam Hassan Iquioussen and opposed the abaya ban in schools in 2023. Since October 2023 he has been a prominent figure in the pro-Palestinian collective Urgence Palestine, appearing alongside LFI deputies including Rima Hassan, Thomas Portes and Ersilia Soudais.

== Controversies and legal challenges ==
On 8 September 2024, during a Urgence Palestine rally in Paris, d'Imzalène called for an “intifada in Paris, in the banlieues and in our neighbourhoods” to “liberate Jerusalem”. He was reported to the prosecutor by the Interior Ministry, placed in custody on 24 September and tried on 23 October 2024. On 19 December 2024, the Paris Judicial Court convicted him of public provocation to hatred or violence on the basis of origin, ethnicity, nationality, race or religion. He received a five-month suspended prison sentence and was ordered to pay €1,000 in damages to each of the five civil-party associations. D'Imzalène appealed the verdict; hearings were held on 7-8 January 2026. During the trial he argued that “intifada” referred to a peaceful uprising.

On 13 January 2025, the French government issued an order freezing d'Imzalène’s assets for six months under anti-terrorism financing provisions (articles L. 562-2 et suivants du code monétaire et financier). He announced he would challenge the measure before the administrative tribunal.
