= Arnaud Bonnet =

French politician (born 1977)

Member of the French National Assembly for the Seine-et-Marne's 8th constituency
- Incumbent
- Assumed office 8 July 2024
- Preceded by: Hadrien Ghomi

Personal details
- Born: 23 February 1977 (age 49) Argenteuil
- Party: The Ecologists

Arnaud Bonnet (born 23 February 1977) is a French politician from The Ecologists. In the 2024 French legislative election, he was elected member of the National Assembly for Seine-et-Marne's 8th constituency.

== Biography ==
Bonnet is the son of teachers and originally from Argenteuil, and is himself a certified teacher of Life and Earth Sciences in middle school. He worked at the Académie de Créteil in Ivry-sur-Seine then in Pontault-Combault.

He entered politics in 2019 and joined Europe Écologie Les Verts. The following year, he became head of the party's "childhood, education and training" commission.

In the 2022 French legislative election, Arnaud Bonnet represented the New Popular Ecological and Social Union (NUPES) in Seine-et-Marne's 8th constituency. He was beaten in the second round by four votes by the Renaissance candidate Hadrien Ghomi. This gap was reduced to one vote by the Constitutional Council.

Arnaud Bonnet was once again a candidate in the 2024 French legislative election, following the dissolution of the National Assembly. He received the investiture of the New Popular Front and came first in the first round with 36.29% of the vote, ahead of Hadrien Ghomi (33.03%) and Manon Mourgères of the National Rally (RN) (27.97%). In a three-way race, he was elected deputy in the second round with 39.28% of the vote, ahead of the outgoing deputy (33.79%) and the RN candidate (26.93%). He intends to work in the National Assembly in particular on all areas of childhood, including National Education, as well as the subjects of civic democracy and political ethics.

== Election results ==
Election	Party	Constituency	1st ^{round}			2nd ^{round}		
Election	Party	Constituency	Votes	%	Rank	Votes	%	Rank
2022	EÉLV (NUPES)	Seine-et-Marne's 8th constituency	13,044	32.46	1st	19,319	49.99	Beaten
2024	LÉ (NFP)	Seine-et-Marne's 8th constituency	22,663	36.29	1st	24,892	39.28	Elected

== See also ==
- List of deputies of the 17th National Assembly of France
