= Maxime Laisney =

French politician (born 1981)

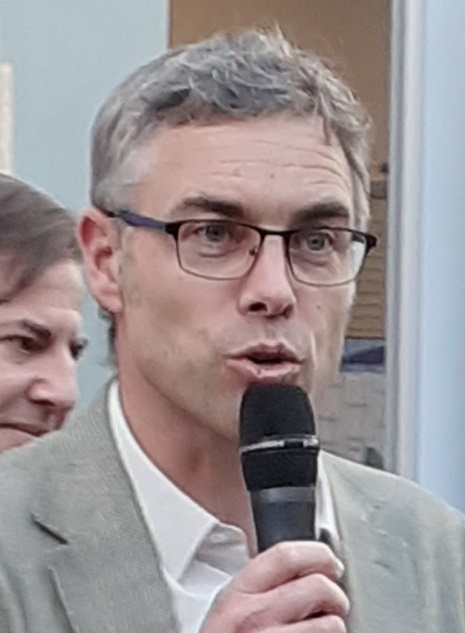
- Maxime Laisney in 2022

Member of the National Assembly for Seine-et-Marne's 10th constituency
- In office 22 June 2022 – 9 June 2024
- Preceded by: Stéphanie Do
- Succeeded by: to be elected

Personal details
- Born: 19 January 1981 (age 45) Lisieux, France
- Party: La France Insoumise
- Other political affiliations: NUPES (2022); NFP (2024)

Maxime Laisney (born 19 January 1981) is a French politician of La France Insoumise who has been representing Seine-et-Marne's 10th constituency in the National Assembly since 2022. In the 2022 French legislative election he unseated En Marche MP Stéphanie Do.

== See also ==
- List of deputies of the 16th National Assembly of France
