= Seine-et-Marne's 8th constituency =

Constituency of the National Assembly of France

8th constituency of Seine-et-Marne
- inline Constituency of the National Assembly of France

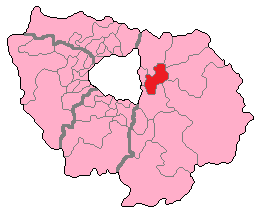
- Seine-et-Marne's 8th Constituency shown within Île-de-France
- Deputy: Arnaud Bonnet; Ecologist
- Department: Seine-et-Marne
- Cantons: Roissy-en-Brie, Torcy, Thorigny-sur-Marne (part)
- Registered voters: 82,689

The 8th constituency of Seine-et-Marne is a French legislative constituency in the Seine-et-Marne département.

== Description ==
The 8th constituency of Seine-et-Marne lies in its centre and includes parts of the vast new town of Marne-la-Vallée. The seat contains Disneyland Paris.

The seat is a classic marginal changing hands at every election since 1988 with the sole exception of 2007. In 2022, LREM retained the seat by only four votes from the EELV/NUPES candidate.

== Historic Representation ==
Election	Member	Party
1986	Proportional representation – no election by constituency	
1988	Jean-Pierre Fourré	PS
1993	Gérard Jeffray	UDF
1997	Daniel Vachez	PS
2002	Chantal Brunel	UMP
2007	Chantal Brunel	UMP
2012	Eduardo Rihan Cypel	PS
2017	Jean-Michel Fauvergue	LREM
2022	Hadrien Ghomi	RE
2024	Arnaud Bonnet	LÉ

== Election results ==
=== 2024 ===
Candidate	Party	Alliance	First round			Second round		
Candidate	Party	Alliance	Votes	%	+/–	Votes	%	+/–
Arnaud Bonnet	LÉ	NFP	22,663	36.29	+3.83	24,892	39.28	-10.71
Hadrien Ghomi	RE	ENS	20,622	33.03	+2.42	21,411	33.79	-16.22
Manon Mourgeres	RN		17,465	27.97	+11.52	17,066	26.93	N/A
Jean-Marc Moskowicz	REC		869	1.39	-3.48			
Frédéric Renault	LO		822	1.32	+0.11			
Henriette Sauvage	DIV		1	0.00	N/A			
Bernard Duchaussoy	DVE		0	0.00	-2.86			
Valid votes			62,442	97.35	-0.76	63,369	98.00	+3.81
Blank votes			1,320	2.06	+0.58	1,009	1.56	-2.71
Null votes			379	0.59	+0.18	287	0.44	-1.10
Turnout			64,141	65.68	+22.63	64,665	66.17	+23.08
Abstentions			33,523	34.32	-22.63	33,054	33.83	-23.08
Registered voters			97,664			97,719		
Source: Ministry of the Interior, Le Monde
Result						LÉ GAIN FROM RE		

=== 2022 ===
Legislative Election 2022: Seine-et-Marne's 8th constituency
Party	Candidate	Votes	%	±%
EELV (NUPÉS)	Arnaud Bonnet	13,044	32.46	+3.05
LREM (Ensemble)	Hadrien Ghomi	12,301	30.61	-11.48
RN	Reine Lecuyer	6,610	16.45	+5.96
LR (UDC)	Delphine Mairiaux	3,287	8.18	−6.32
REC	Jean-Marc Moskowicz	1,958	4.87	N/A
DVE	Bernard Duchaussoy	1,148	2.86	N/A
Others	N/A	1,843	4.59	
Turnout		40,191	43.05	−1.41
2nd round result
LREM (Ensemble)	Hadrien Ghomi	19,323	50.01	-17.18
EELV (NUPÉS)	Arnaud Bonnet	19,319	49.99	N/A
Turnout		38,642	43.09	+10.46
LREM hold				

=== 2017 ===
Legislative Election 2017: Seine-et-Marne's 8th constituency
Party	Candidate	Votes	%	±%
LREM	Jean-Michel Fauvergue	16,632	42.09	
LR	Chantal Brunel	5,729	14.50	
LFI	Julia Killian	5,140	13.01	
FN	Josette Blesson	4,143	10.49	
PS	Eduardo Rihan Cypel	4,051	10.25	
EELV	Sabrina Seghiri	1,567	3.97	
PCF	Flora Domingues	862	2.18	
DLF	Jacqueline Levy	804	2.03	
Others	N/A	584		
Turnout		39,512	44.46	
2nd round result
LREM	Jean-Michel Fauvergue	19,485	67.19	
LR	Chantal Brunel	9,513	32.81	
Turnout		28,998	32.63	
LREM gain from PS				

=== 2012 ===
Legislative Election 2012: Seine-et-Marne's 8th constituency
Party	Candidate	Votes	%	±%
PS	Eduardo Rihan Cypel	16,437	37.37	
UMP	Chantal Brunel	13,991	31.81	
FN	Chantal Delhaye	5,731	13.03	
FG	Marie-Luce Nemo	2,347	5.34	
MoDem	Michel Geres	2,044	4.65	
EELV	Julie Nouvion	1,385	3.15	
Others	N/A	2,054		
Turnout		44,519	53.84	
2nd round result
PS	Eduardo Rihan Cypel	22,508	52.77	
UMP	Chantal Brunel	20,141	47.23	
Turnout		43,856	53.04	
PS gain from UMP				

== Sources ==
Official results of French elections from 2002: "Résultats électoraux officiels en France" (in French).
