= Stéphanie Do =

French politician (born 1979)

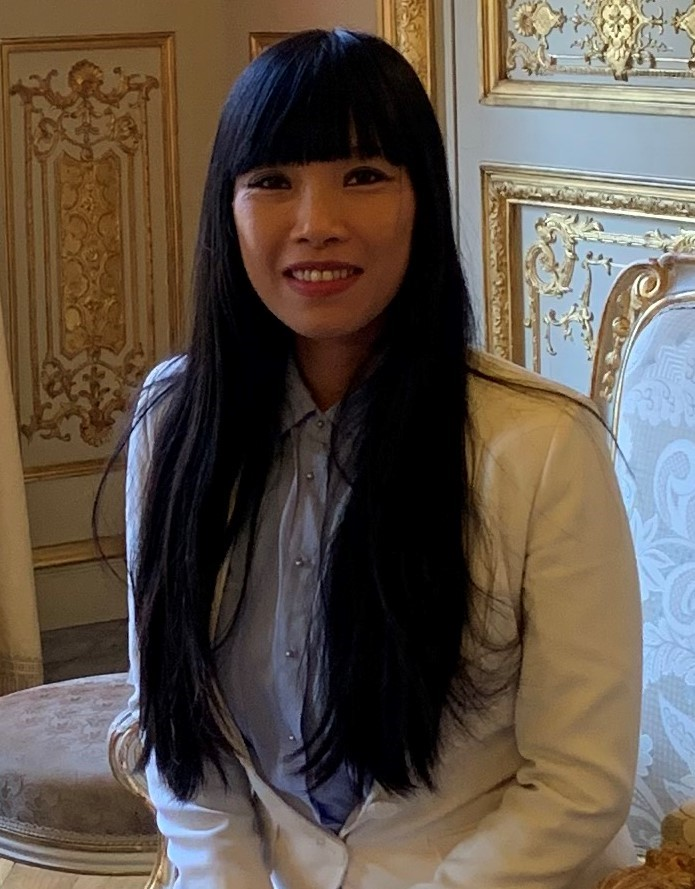
- Do in 2019

Member of the National Assembly for Seine-et-Marne's 10th constituency
- In office 21 June 2017 – 21 June 2022
- Preceded by: Émeric Bréhier
- Succeeded by: Maxime Laisney

Personal details
- Born: 20 December 1979 (age 46) Ho Chi Minh City, Vietnam
- Party: La République En Marche!

Stéphanie Do (born 20 December 1979) is a French politician and a member of La République En Marche!. She was elected to the French National Assembly on 18 June 2017, representing the 10th constituency of department of Seine-et-Marne, under the investiture of La République En Marche. She was the first woman of Vietnamese origin to be elected to the French Parliament. Do served as a secretary in the Bureau of the National Assembly during the 15th legislature of the French Fifth Republic.

In the 2022 French legislative election she lost her seat to Maxime Laisney from La France Insoumise.

She founded the micro-political party Ensemble pour notre France in June 2025.

== Career ==
Graduate of a Master in Public Management from the École nationale d'administration (ENA) and Paris Dauphine University (2014), postgraduate in Global Supply Chain Management at KEDGE Business School (2004), Stéphanie Do worked in the first part of her career (2004–2014) in international consulting firms (Capgemini, Sopra Group, Mazars) as a consultant and manager for projects aiming at redressing the economic and social situations of companies in the private and public sectors, associations and local authorities. She then held the position of project manager at the French Ministry of Economy and Finances (2014–2017).

Stéphanie Do started her involvement with La République En Marche! (LREM) when the political movement was founded in April 2016. She served as the departmental referent for the Seine-et-Marne department until June 2017. and as campaign director for Emmanuel Macron candidacy in Seine-et-Marne during the presidential elections. Emmanuel Macron obtained 23.11% of the votes in the first round presidential election results in 2017 before Marine Le Pen, who obtained 22.85% in Seine-et-Marne, a department whose territory is mostly rural. Emmanuel Macron then won the second round presidential election with 63.86% of the vote in the department.

She was elected member of parliament (MP) in Seine-et-Marne's tenth constituency in the French legislative elections of 2017 under LREM.

== French National Assembly ==
Stéphanie Do was nominated as secretary at the Bureau of the National Assembly from June to October 2017. She was also elected Assistant Treasurer in the Bureau of the La République En Marche group. She joined the Commission on Economic Affairs and the Commission of Assessment of Public Policies. In 2019, she was nominated as member of the Commission of Inquiry on the situation and practices of mass retailers and its groups in their commercial relations with suppliers and joined the Special Commission in charge of accounts verifying and auditing. As a member of the Commission on Economic Affairs, she was appointed Rapporteur for the Housing and presided a Working Group on the Housing Act ELAN delivered by the Secretary of State in charge of Housing Julien Denormandie and the Minister Jacques Mézard. Every year since the beginning of her term, she has been appointed rapporteur for budget advice on housing credits in Finance Bills. Its reports for budget advice for 2018 and 2019, published respectively on 9 October 2017 and 3 October 2018, are available on the website of the French National Assembly. She is also the author of a report, published in January 2018, which transcribes the proposals made and retained by the Working Group concerning the Housing Legislative Proposal (ELAN).

She participated in the Consensus Conference on the ELAN draft legislation in the Senate. As a result, she tabled 63 amendments to the ELAN Bill, 14 of which were adopted. one of which aimed at providing individualized digital accompaniment, car sharing, bulky removal and recycling in social housing organizations. Other of its amendments have been taken up and filed on behalf of La République En Marche group. Her investment in the ELAN Bill helped her to earn the sixth place in the most influential members of parliament list in 2018 on behalf of "Rumeur Publique" agencies and "Data Observer". As regards her extra-parliamentary functions, she is also a full member of the Concertation Trade Commission and sits on the Departmental Commission provided for in Article L. 2334-37 of the General Code of Local Government. She also serves as secretary of the French section of the Assemblée Parlementaire de la Francophonie (A.P.F.).

Stéphanie Do involved in the parliamentary rapprochement between France and Southeast Asia in the National Assembly. She is the President of a France-Vietnam Friendship Group at the French National Assembly, which allows her to play a role in consolidating the bilateral relationship between France and Vietnam. She is also the Vice-President of Friendship Groups in charge of the parliamentary relations between France-Laos, France-South Korea and France-Bruneï Malaysia. She sits at the office of the section française de la Francophonie, thereby promotes Francophonie in Asia.

== Constituency ==
Stéphanie Do has intervened on several local issues.

In Noisiel, following the relocation of Nestlé France, the largest employer in her constituency, Do interpellated Delphine Gény-Stephann, Secretary of State to the Minister of the Economy, on 22 February 2018 at the hemicycle. She confirmed that the Government would ensure that all accompanying measures were offered to 1800 employees.

In particular, she supported communes in her constituency to benefit from the Police Security Daily (PSQ) experimentation with the Ministry of the Interior Gérard Collomb in November 2017. Thus, the municipalities of Champs-sur-Marne, Emerainville and Noisiel had responded positively to the request of the Deputy to support their candidature sending to the Minister of the Interior. Consequently, the municipality of Noisiel was selected on February to benefit from the PSQ experimentation in 2019.

Do is also committed to the construction of the new public transport network of the Grand Paris Express (GPE). She mobilized to give priority to her constituency as part of the new GPE implementation schedule in January 2018, at the GPE seminar organized by Prime Minister Edouard Philippe and the Minister of Transport Elisabeth Borne. Line 15 South (Noisy-Champs) commissioning was planned for 2024 by the Government because it is one of the lines that benefit the greatest number of Parisians. Following the postponement of the section commissioning between Chelles and Noisy-Champs on line 16, Do communicated with various actors (local elected officials, prefects, ministers) to create a conducive dialogue to the negotiation of new timetable and the development of alternative solutions, efforts ended with the promise that the commissioning would finally be carried out before 2030. The newspaper La Marne on Wednesday, 9 May, devoted a section on the actions of the deputy on this file.

Following the floods that occurred in Seine-et-Marne in January 2018, Do interpellated the Minister of the Ecological and Solidarity Transition Nicolas Hulot and his Secretary of State Brune Poirson on 23 January 2018 during questions to the Government. Its intervention has helped to encourage the construction of facilities in all municipalities where the Seine flows to prevent flooding.

Then, in May 2018, following damage caused by new floods, she again asked Nicolas Hulot for the Seine-et-Marne municipalities benefit from the recognition for natural disaster. In September 2018, a hundred municipalities of Seine-et-Marne were recognized of natural disaster [34][35], including 4 cities of his constituency (Brou-sur-Chantereine, Chelles, Lognes and Vaires-sur-Marne).

Do supported structuring projects for municipalities in the 10th constituency of Seine-et-Marne, in the context of calls for projects on behalf of the Local Investment Support Staffing (DSIL). In total, 11.5 million euros in loans were granted to the Seine-et-Marne municipalities in 2018. Three communes in the 10th constituency receive funding of more than 1 million euros. In Champs-sur-Marne, the project for the construction of sustainable housing receives funding of 250,000 euros and five families will be able to move out of slums. In June 2018, Stéphanie Do intervened with the Prime Minister in favor of this project. In Chelles, five projects receive funding for a total budget of 720 118 euros. Among them, an endowment of more than 237 650 euros will be paid to bring children's games up to standard and secure. Finally, in Brou-sur-Chantereine, the State invested 94 045 euros notably to enlarge the refectory of the Suzanne Demetz school.

Since 2017, Do has been working with parents of students from Champs-sur-Marne, Noisiel and Chelles to improve the conditions of school transportation for children on several sections of line 25 in Seine-et-Marne. Indeed, city buses unsuitable for school transport had replaced coaches. She brought the demands of parents of students to Île-de-France Mobilités. She obtained then the change of rolling stock for the Gournay - Champs-sur-Marne section.

== International ==
On 26 March 2018, Nguyen Phu Trong, General Secretary of the Communist Party of Vietnam was received in the National Assembly as part of his official visit to France. Stephanie Do, as President of the France-Vietnam Friendship Group in the National Assembly, welcomed him and then participated in exchanges with François de Rugy, President of the French National Assembly. The next day, the President of the Republic, Emmanuel Macron, invited Stephanie Do to have lunch at the Elysee in honor of the visit of this Secretary General.

Stéphanie Do accompanied Prime Minister Édouard Philippe when his official visit to Vietnam from 1 to 4 November 2018. In this context, an exchange meeting was held between the French and Vietnamese parliamentary groups.

In April 2019, French National Assembly President Richard Ferrand welcomed Vietnamese National Assembly President Nguyễn Thị Kim Ngân, in the presence of Stéphanie Do at the 11th Conference of French-Vietnamese Decentralized Cooperation.

Stéphanie Do visited Vietnam as part of an official visit, at the invitation of the President of the French Republic, Emmanuel Macron, and his wife, Brigitte Macron, from May 25 to May 27, 2025.

== See also ==
- 2017 French legislative election
