= Jean-Marc Brûlé =

French politician (1965–2023)

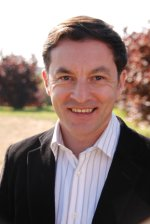
- Jean-Marc Brûlé in 2008

Member of the Regional Council of Île-de-France
- In office 2004–2015
- President: Jean-Paul Huchon

Mayor of Cesson
- In office 2008–2010
- Preceded by: Christian Didion
- Succeeded by: Olivier Chaplet

Personal details
- Born: 16 June 1965 Caen, France
- Died: 25 November 2023 (aged 58) Pléchâtel, Ille-et-Vilaine, France
- Party: The Greens; Europe Ecology–The Greens

Jean-Marc Brûlé (16 June 1965 – 25 November 2023) was a French politician of Europe Ecology–The Greens, Regional Councillor of Île-de-France. Founder of the Asian Committee of The Greens, he was chairman of L'Atelier, a regional resource center of the social economy and was a national secretary-assistant of Europe Écologie in charge of elections and institutions. Brûlé died in Brittany on 25 November 2023 at the age of 58.
