= Hadrien Ghomi =

French politician (born 1989)

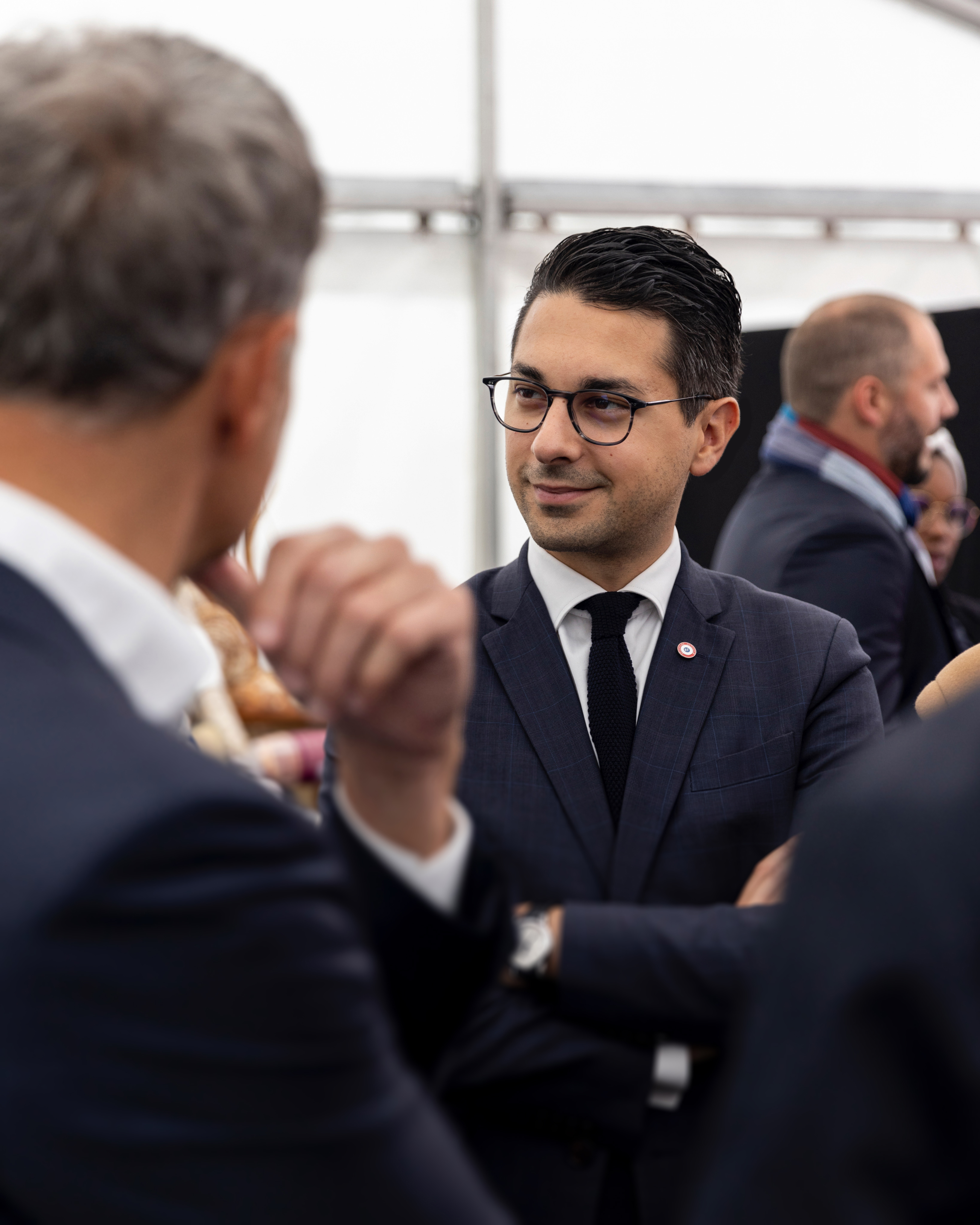

Member of the National Assembly for Seine-et-Marne's 8th constituency
- In office 22 June 2022 – 9 June 2024
- Preceded by: Jean-Michel Fauvergue
- Succeeded by: Arnaud Bonnet

Personal details
- Born: 6 April 1989 (age 37) Nogent-sur-Marne, France
- Party: La République En Marche! (since 2016)

Hadrien Ghomi (born 6 April 1989) is a French politician from La République En Marche! and a former member of the National Assembly from Seine-et-Marne's 8th constituency from 2022 to 2024.

In the 2022 election he was elected in the second round by a majority of just four votes. He was unseated by Ecologists candidate Arnaud Bonnet in the 2024 French legislative election.

== See also ==
- List of deputies of the 16th National Assembly of France
