= Rodrigue Kokouendo =

French politician

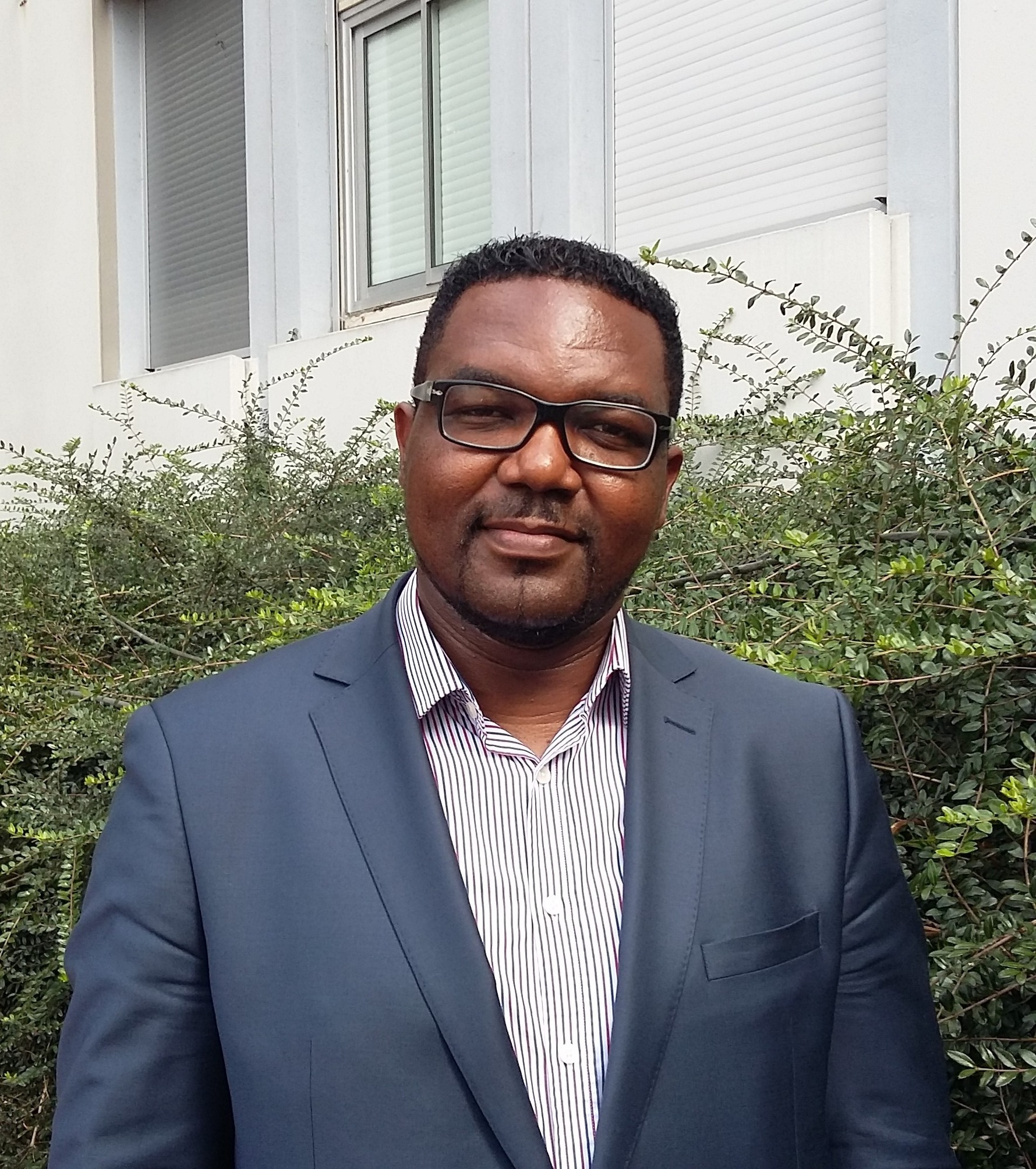

Member of the French National Assembly for Seine-et-Marne's 7th constituency
- In office 21 June 2017 – 21 June 2022
- Preceded by: Yves Albarello
- Succeeded by: Ersilia Soudais

Member of the Municipal council of Villeparisis.
- In office 2008–2014

Personal details
- Born: 8 March 1974 (age 52) Bangui, Central African Republic
- Party: En Marche!
- Occupation: Accountant

Rodrigue Kokouendo (born 21 June 1974) is a French politician of La République En Marche! (LREM) who served as a member of the French National Assembly from 2017 to 2022, representing the department of Seine-et-Marne.

== Early career ==
Kokouendo holds a master's degree in management and a higher diploma in accounting and finance. He worked as an accountant at BNP Paribas and was a city councilor of Villeparisis from 2008 to 2014.

== Political career ==
Having previously been an active member of the Socialist Party, Kokuendo joined LREM in 2016. He was elected deputy of the 7th constituency of Seine-et-Marne during the legislative elections of 2017 under the colors of La République en marche! with 61.48% of the votes.

In parliament, Kokouendo served on the Committee on Foreign Affairs. In addition to his committee assignments, he was a member of the French-Angolan Parliamentary Friendship Group, the French-Nigerian Parliamentary Friendship Group, and the French-South Sudanese Parliamentary Friendship Group. In 2020, Kokouendo joined En commun (EC), a group within LREM led by Barbara Pompili.

Kokouendo lost his seat in the first round of the 2022 French legislative election.

== Political positions ==
In July 2019, Kokouendo voted in favor of the French ratification of the European Union’s Comprehensive Economic and Trade Agreement (CETA) with Canada.

== See also ==
- 2017 French legislative election
