= Seine-et-Marne's 7th constituency =

Constituency of the National Assembly of France

7th constituency of Seine-et-Marne
- inline Constituency of the National Assembly of France

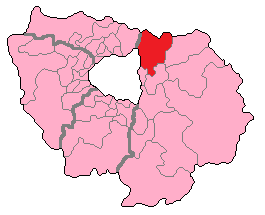
- Seine-et-Marne's 7th Constituency shown within Île-de-France
- Deputy: Ersilia Soudais; LFI
- Department: Seine-et-Marne
- Cantons: Claye-Souilly, Lagny-sur-Marne, Mitry-Mory, Dammartin-en-Goële (Part)
- Registered voters: 81,916

The 7th constituency of Seine-et-Marne is a French legislative constituency in the Seine-et-Marne département.

== Description ==
The 7th constituency of Seine-et-Marne lies in the north of the department.

The seat was held by the right from 1993 when it was captured in the conservative landslide by Charles Cova of the RPR until the LREM landslide of 2017. At the 2012 election Yves Albarello of the conservative UMP held the seat by less than one hundred votes over his Socialist opponent.

== Historic Representation ==
Election	Member	Party
1986	Proportional representation – no election by constituency	
1988	Jean-Paul Planchou	PS
1993	Charles Cova	RPR
1997	Charles Cova	RPR
2002	Charles Cova	UMP
2007	Yves Albarello	UMP
2012	Yves Albarello	UMP
2017	Rodrigue Kokouendo	LREM
2022	Ersilia Soudais	LFI

== Election results ==
=== 2024 ===
Candidate	Party	Alliance	First round			Second round		
Candidate	Party	Alliance	Votes	%	+/–	Votes	%	+/–
Agnès Laffite	RN		20,179	35.72	+11.42	24,063	47.00	-1.69
Ersilia Soudais	LFI	NFP	18,557	32.85	+1.96	27,137	53.00	+1.69
Christian Robache	HOR	ENS	10,611	18.78	-5.24			
Rodrigue Kokouendo	DVD		3,345	5.92	N/A			
Naïma Moghir	DVE		1,872	3.31	N/A			
Mathilde Yu-Yueng	DLF		678	1.20	-0.65			
Yannick Carlino	REC		657	1.16	-3.63			
Gabrielle Frija	LO		587	1.04	-0.48			
Maria Louro	DIV		3	0.01	N/A			
Valid votes			56,489	97.45	-0.26	51,200	90.05	+1.76
Blank votes			1,056	1.82	-0.01	4,514	7.94	-1.65
Null votes			423	0.73	+0.27	1,141	2.01	-0.11
Turnout			57,968	64.97	+22.18	56,855	63.69	+21.65
Abstentions			31,255	35.03	-22.18	32,412	36.31	-21.65
Registered voters			89,223			89,267		
Source: Ministry of the Interior, Le Monde
Result						LFI HOLD		

=== 2022 ===
Legislative Election 2022: Seine-et-Marne's 7th constituency
Party	Candidate	Votes	%	±%
LFI (NUPÉS)	Ersilia Soudais	11,344	30.89	+5.04
RN	Didier Bernard	8,923	24.30	+6.61
LREM (Ensemble)	Rodrigue Kokouendo	8,823	24.02	−7.80
LR (UDC)	Patrick Jahier	3,509	9.55	−6.58
REC	Beatrice Troussard	1,759	4.79	N/A
PA	Laetitia Guillard	847	2.31	N/A
Others	N/A	1,522	4.14	
Turnout		36,727	42.79	−1.20
2nd round result
LFI (NUPÉS)	Ersilia Soudais	16,732	51.31	N/A
RN	Didier Bernard	15,880	48.69	+10.17
Turnout		32,612	42.04	+7.21
LFI gain from LREM				

=== 2017 ===
Legislative Election 2017: Seine-et-Marne's 7th constituency
Party	Candidate	Votes	%	±%
LREM	Rodrigue Kokouendo	11,951	31.82	
FN	Béatrice Troussard	6,645	17.69	
LR	Yves Albarello	6,057	16.13	
LFI	Grégory Jurado	4,556	12.13	
PCF	Marianne Margaté	2,491	6.63	
PS	Stéphane Jabut	1,617	4.31	
DVD	Julien Proffit	1,185	3.16	
EELV	Farid Djabali	1,043	2.78	
Others	N/A	2,012		
Turnout		37,556	43.99	
2nd round result
LREM	Rodrigue Kokouendo	18,279	61.48	
FN	Béatrice Troussard	11,455	38.52	
Turnout		29,734	34.83	
LREM gain from LR				

=== 2012 ===
Legislative Election 2012: Seine-et-Marne's 7th constituency
Party	Candidate	Votes	%	±%
UMP	Yves Albarello	15,132	33.66	
PS	Sophie Cerqueira	15,058	33.50	
FN	Georges Martin	8,010	17.82	
FG	Marianne Margate	4,286	9.53	
EELV	Antoine Parodi	1,111	2.47	
Others	N/A	1,356		
Turnout		45,425	55.45	
2nd round result
UMP	Yves Albarello	21,583	50.08	
PS	Sophie Cerqueira	21,513	49.92	
Turnout		44,301	54.08	
UMP hold				

=== 2007 ===
Legislative Election 2007: Seine-et-Marne's 7th constituency
Party	Candidate	Votes	%	±%
UMP	Yves Albarello	22,880	46.41	
PS	Emeric Brehier	12,245	24.84	
MoDem	Sylvie Angeli	4,247	8.61	
FN	Julien Sanchez	2,628	5.33	
PCF	Jean-Marc Ferrand	2,024	4.11	
LV	Cécile Gilbert	1,778	3.61	
Far left	Catherine Jouanneau	997	2.02	
Others	N/A	2,503		
Turnout		49,883	56.28	
2nd round result
UMP	Yves Albarello	26,084	55.47	
PS	Emeric Brehier	20,940	44.53	
Turnout		48,095	54.27	
UMP hold				

=== 2002 ===
Legislative Election 2002: Seine-et-Marne's 7th constituency
Party	Candidate	Votes	%	±%
UMP	Charles Cova	17,114	34.38	
PS	Jean-Paul Planchou	14,749	30.02	
FN	Dominique Launay	6,442	13.11	
MPF	Romain Chetaille	4,119	8.38	
PCF	Serge Goutmann	1,542	3.14	
LV	Paul Athuil	1,084	2.21	
Others	N/A	4,088		
Turnout		49,821	61.19	
2nd round result
UMP	Charles Cova	24,536	55.31	
PS	Jean-Paul Planchou	19,825	44.69	
Turnout		45,865	56.35	
UMP hold				

=== 1997 ===
Legislative Election 1997: Seine-et-Marne's 7th constituency
Party	Candidate	Votes	%	±%
PS	Jean-Paul Planchou	13,822	29.03	
RPR	Charles Cova	13,794	28.97	
FN	Pierre-Jean Prillard	9,514	19.98	
PCF	Serge Goutmann	3,891	8.17	
GE	Daniel de Berckers	1,652	3.47	
LO	Jacques Beunèche	1,541	3.24	
DVE	Auguste Victoria	1,309	2.75	
DVD	Georges Berthu	1,190	2.50	
Others	N/A	901		
Turnout		49,375	63.64	
2nd round result
RPR	Charles Cova	25,251	50.11	
PS	Jean-Paul Planchou	25,140	49.89	
Turnout		53,223	68.60	
RPR hold				

== Sources ==
Official results of French elections from 2002: "Résultats électoraux officiels en France" (in French).
