= Jean-Claude Mignon =

French politician

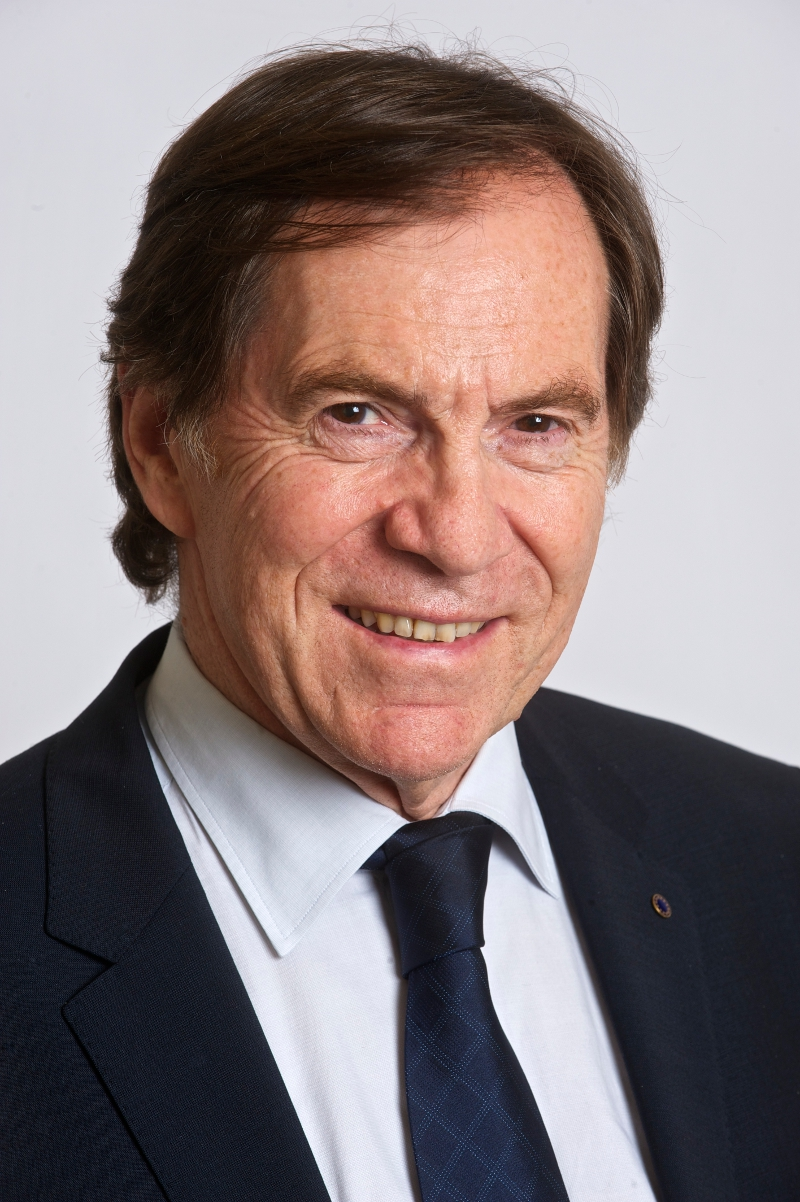
Mignon in 2012.

Jean-Claude Mignon (born February 2, 1950) was a member of the National Assembly of France. He represents the Seine-et-Marne department, and is a member of the Union for a Popular Movement.

On 23 January 2012, he was elected President of the Parliamentary Assembly of the Council of Europe.
