= Arnaud Saint-Martin =

French politician (born 1979)

Member of the French National Assembly for Seine-et-Marne's 1st constituency
- Incumbent
- Assumed office 18 July 2024
- Preceded by: Aude Luquet

Personal details
- Born: 25 January 1979 (age 46)
- Political party: La France Insoumise

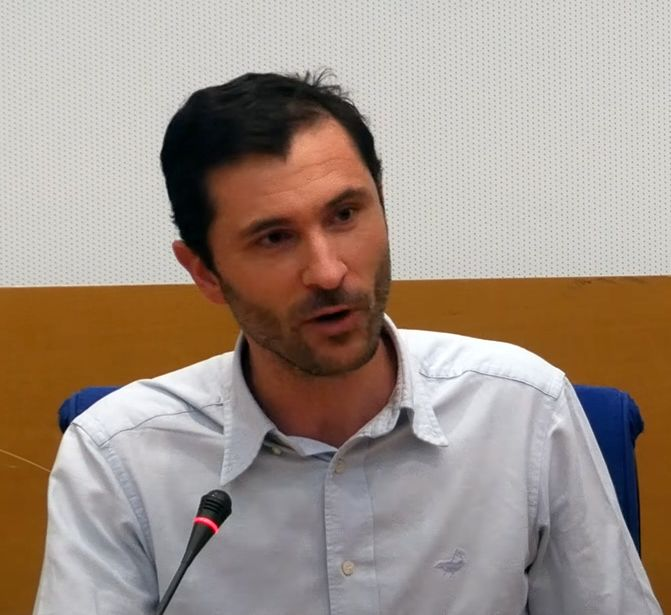
Image taken from a video of Arnaud Saint-Martin during the conference "Responsibility and Irresponsibility of Institutions", broadcast on the YouTube channel Sciences citoyennes

Arnaud Saint-Martin (born 25 January 1979) is a French sociologist and politician of La France Insoumise. In the 2024 legislative election, he was elected member of the National Assembly for Seine-et-Marne's 1st constituency. He was a municipal councillor of Melun from 2020 to 2024, and was a candidate for the constituency in the 2022 legislative election.
