= Béatrice Roullaud =

French politician (born 1960)

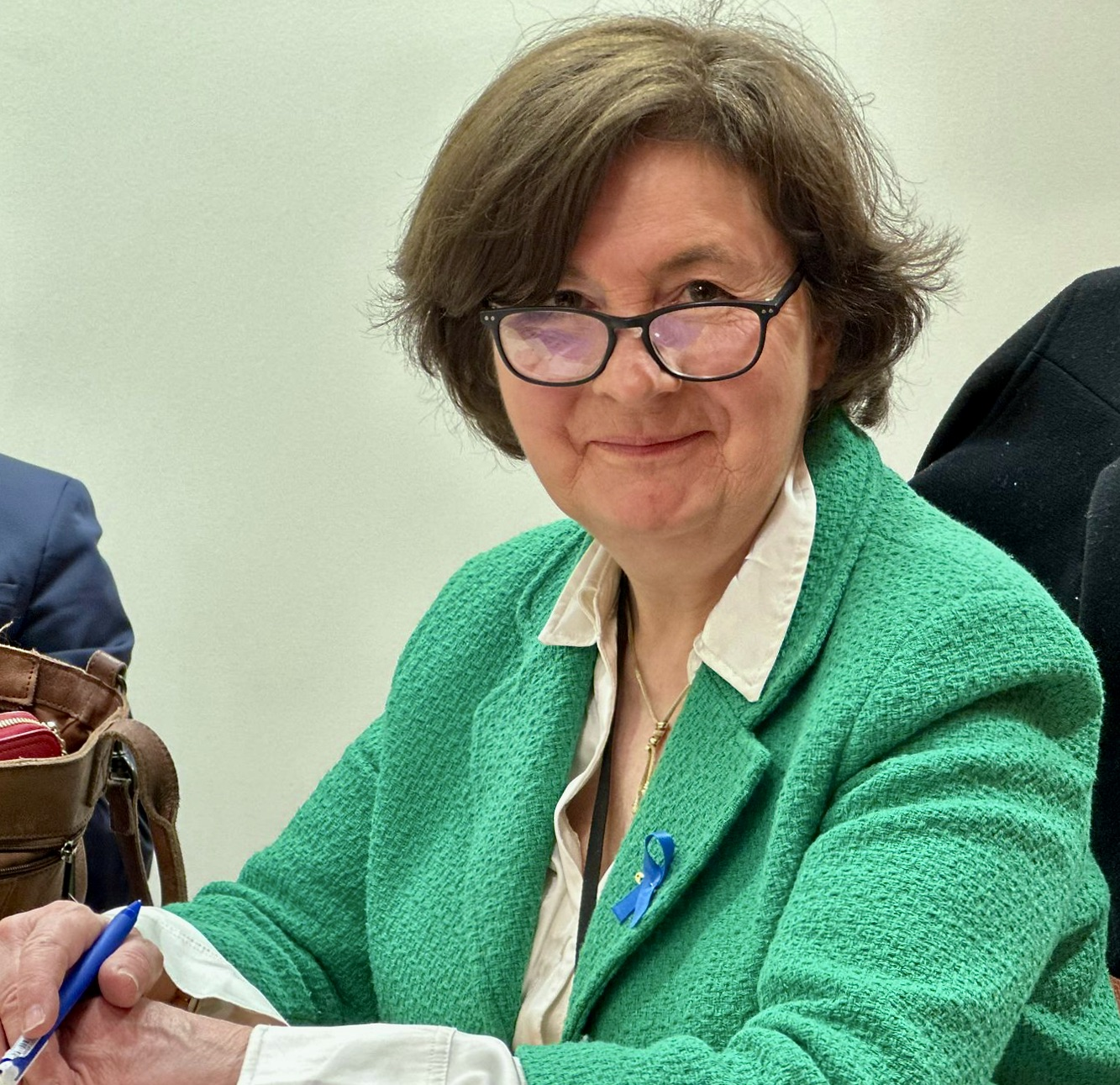

Member of the National Assembly for Seine-et-Marne's 6th constituency
- Incumbent
- Assumed office 22 June 2022
- Preceded by: Bernadette Beauvais

Personal details
- Born: 9 June 1960 (age 66) Béziers, France
- Party: National Rally (2011–present)
- Other political affiliations: Movement for France (before 2011)

Béatrice Roullaud (French pronunciation: [beatʁis ʁulo]; born 9 June 1960) is a French lawyer and politician who has represented the 6th constituency of the Seine-et-Marne department in the National Assembly since 2022. She is a member of the National Rally (RN).

== Career ==
Roullaud began working as a solicitor at a notary public office before becoming a lawyer of the bar of Meaux. She was initially a supporter and member of the Movement for France and campaigned for Philippe de Villiers before joining the National Front in 2011.

She led the National Front (renamed National Rally in 2018) list in Meaux in 2014 and 2026. She was elected a member of the Regional Council of Île-de-France in 2021.

In the 2017 legislative election, Roullaud contested Seine-et-Marne's 6th constituency and placed third in the first round. In 2022, she ran again and defeated Valérie Delage of La France Insoumise with 52.1% of the second-round vote to take the seat. She was reelected in 2024 with 52.5% of the second-round vote.

In the National Assembly, she has sat on the Committee on Laws (2022–2025) and the Committee on Sustainable Development, Spatial and Regional Planning (2025–present).
