= Chantal Brunel =

French politician (born 1948)

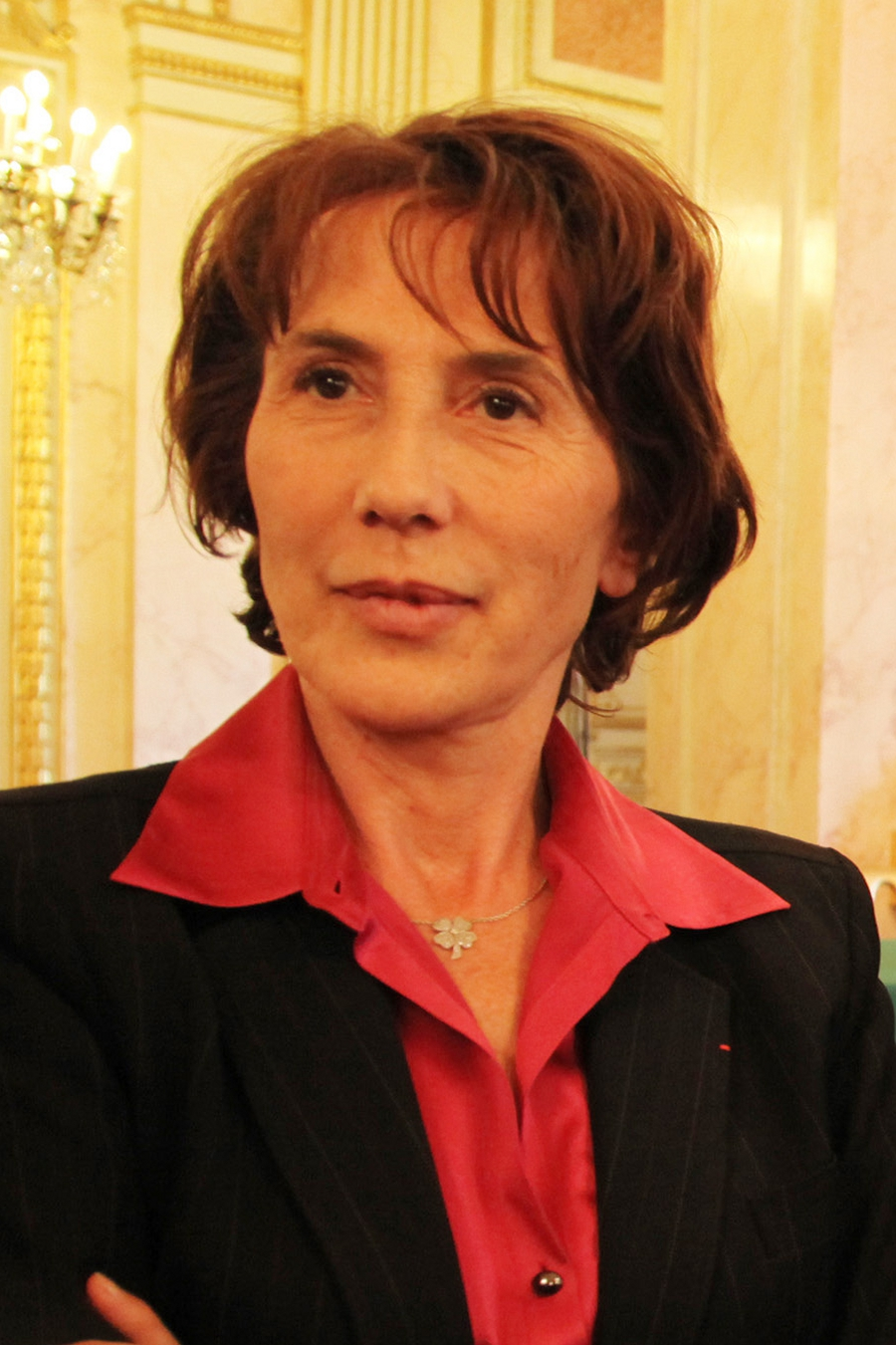
- Chantal Brunel in 2009

Mayor of Bussy-Saint-Georges
- In office 2014–2016
- Preceded by: Hugues Rondeau
- Succeeded by: Yann Dubosc

Member of the National Assembly for Seine-et-Marne's 8th constituency
- In office 2002–2012
- Preceded by: Daniel Vachez
- Succeeded by: Eduardo Rihan Cypel

Personal details
- Born: Chantal Zourbas; 9 September 1948 (age 77) Paris, France
- Party: UMP

Chantal Brunel (born 9 September 1948) was the mayor of Bussy-Saint-Georges from 2014 until 2016. She was a member of the National Assembly of France until 2012. She represented the Seine-et-Marne department. She was a member of the Union for a Popular Movement.

Appointed head of the equality office, she is a supporter of liberalisation of laws against sex work in France.. She is of Greek ancestry.
