= Civil Law Initiative =

French think tank and research center

Civil Law Initiative (French: Fondation pour le droit continental) is a public utility private institution headquartered in Paris, aiming at development of the civil law system and promotion of legal balance in the world.

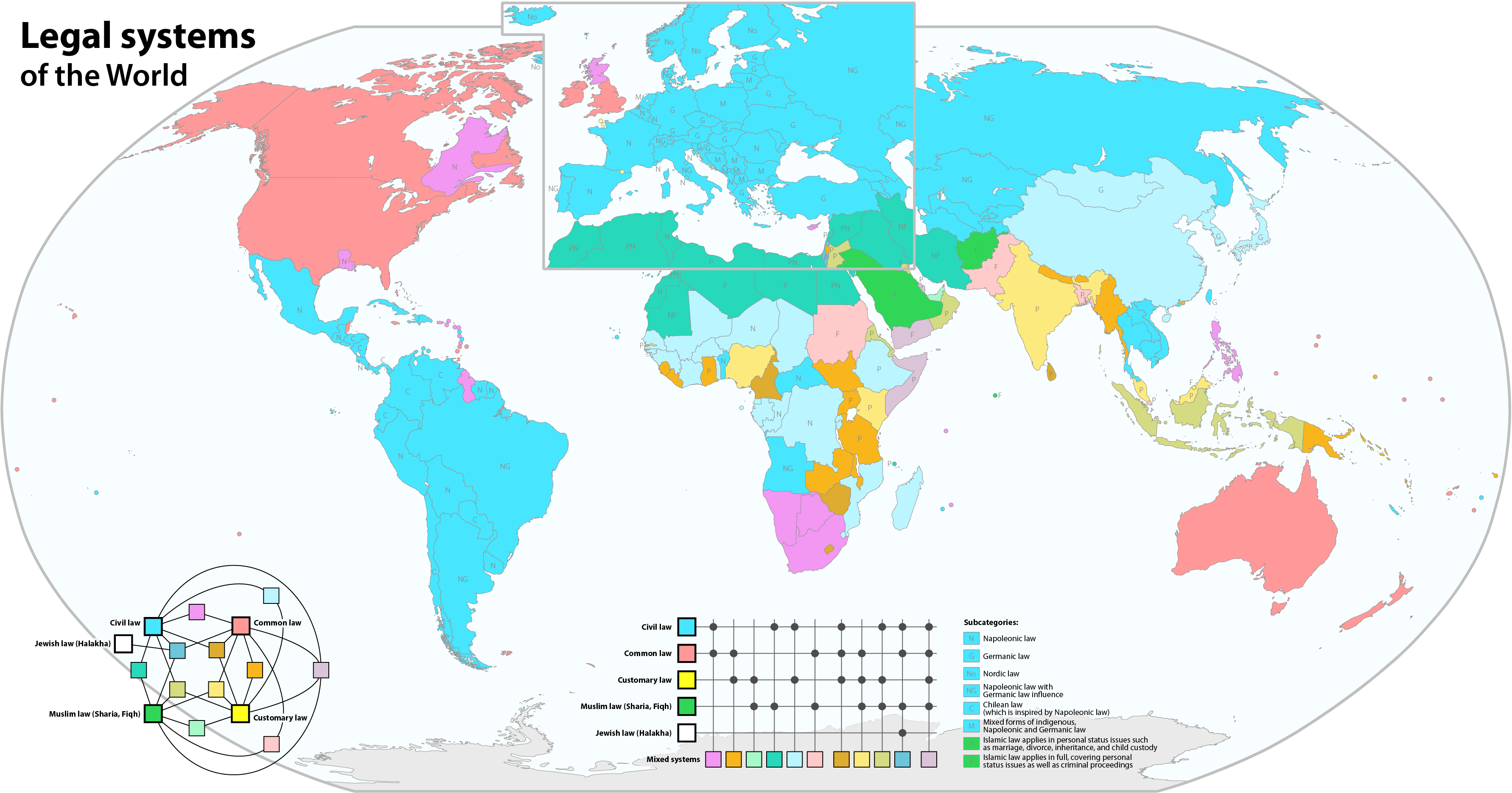
Legal systems across the world.

The main objective of the Initiative is to develop the influence of the civil law tradition and its advantages, especially in relation to business and the economy. The Initiative aspires to become a meeting point of the academic world, the legal professions and the business world.

The establishment of the Initiative was announced by the French Minister of Justice on 1 March 2006. The founding members of the Initiative were:

- Foundation of French Notaries
- Caisse des dépôts et consignations
- French National Bar Council
- Schneider Electric
- Veolia
- TotalEnergies

In addition, the Initiative’s Board include representatives of several French ministries (the Ministry of Economy, Industry and Employment, the Ministry of Foreign Affaires and the Ministry of Justice), the Court of Cassation, as well as the College of Fellows and Association of Friends of the Initiative.

== Partner institutions ==
The Civil Law Initiative cooperates with multiple French and International institutions. Aside from the founders and members of the Initiative’s board, the list of partners include, inter alia:

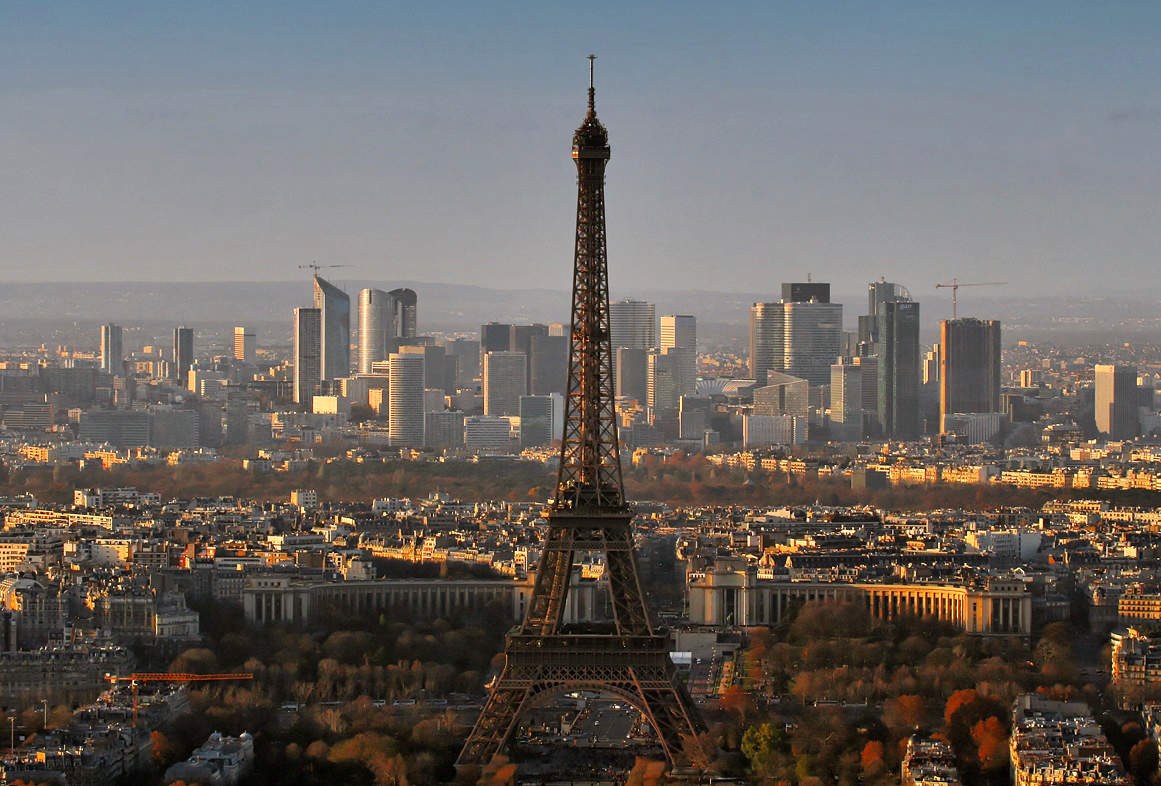
Paris

- Association Henri Capitant
- Conseil d'État
- ICC International Court of Arbitration
- Constitutional Council of France
- OHADA
- Paris Chamber of Commerce
- Senate of France
- Société de Législation Comparée

== Summer University for Continental Law ==
The Summer University for Continental Law established by the Initiative was designed to enable the world’s comparative law specialists (lecturers, the legal professions, business lawyers and graduate students) to meet each year at Panthéon-Assas University in Paris. Numerous seminars and presentations on comparative law are given by pre-eminent specialists in the subject. The Summer University offers an intensive training course with a Certificate in Continental Law granted upon completion.

== See also ==
- Civil law (legal system)
- Legal systems of the world
