= Paris Law School =

Paris Law School may refer to:

- Faculty of Law of Paris (c. 1150 – 1970)
- Paris 2 Panthéon-Assas University (from 1971), the direct inheritor of the Faculty of Law of Paris
- The Faculty of Law of the Université Paris Cité (from 2019)

== See also ==
- Law schools in France
- Sorbonne Law School (disambiguation)
