= Paris-Panthéon-Assas University =

French university in Paris

Coordinates: 48°50′49″N 2°20′41″E

- Université Paris-Panthéon-Assas
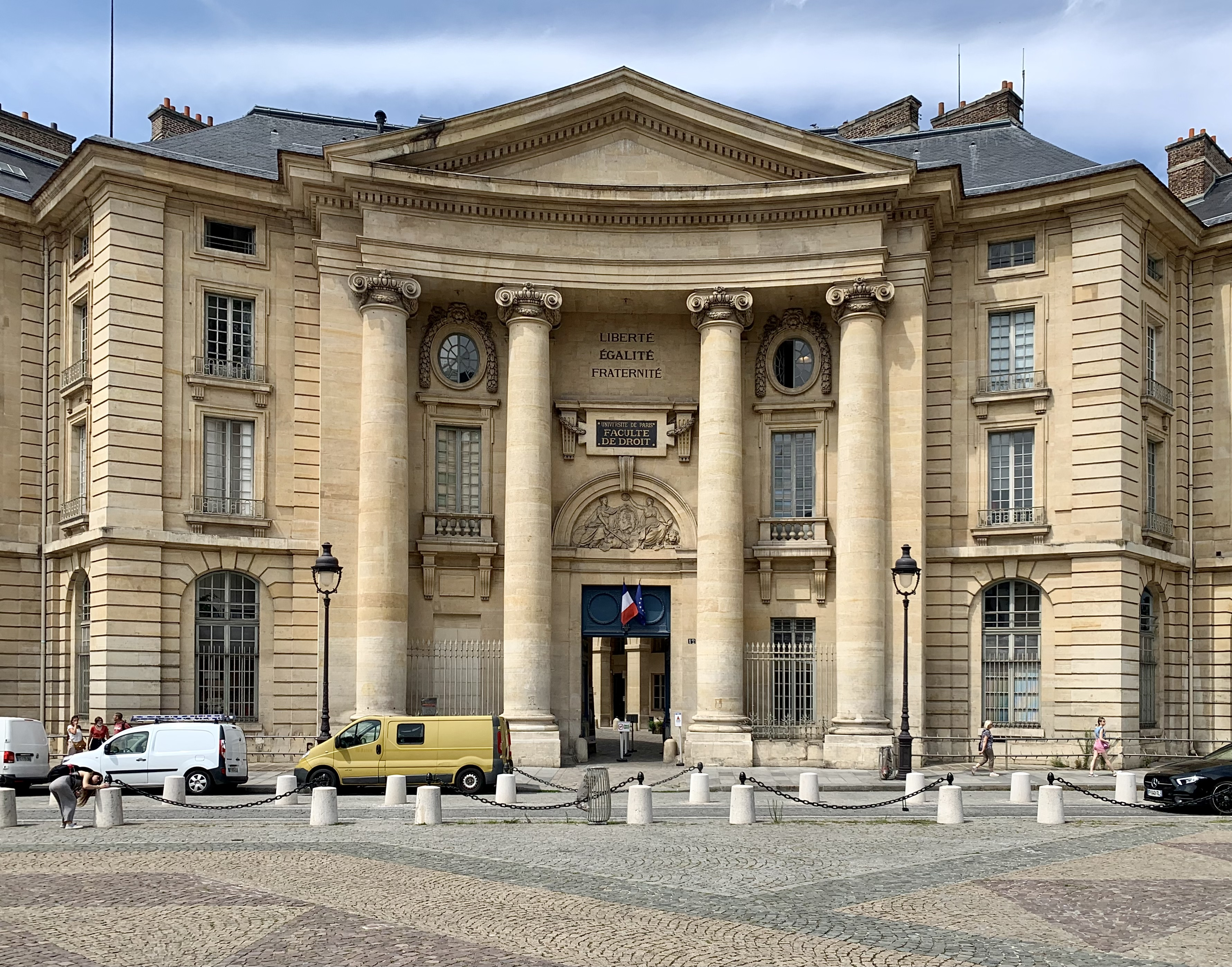
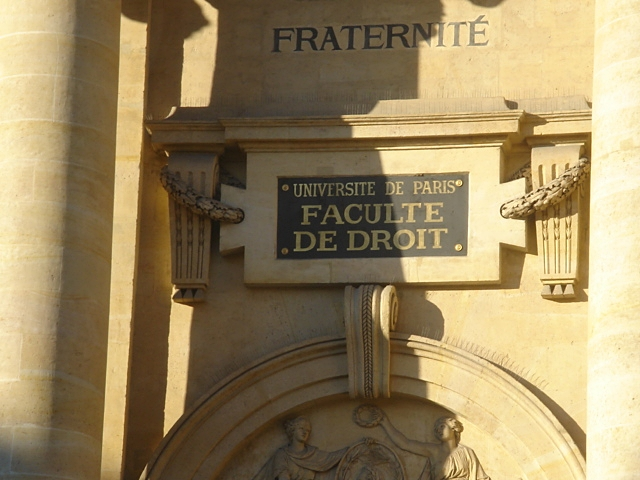
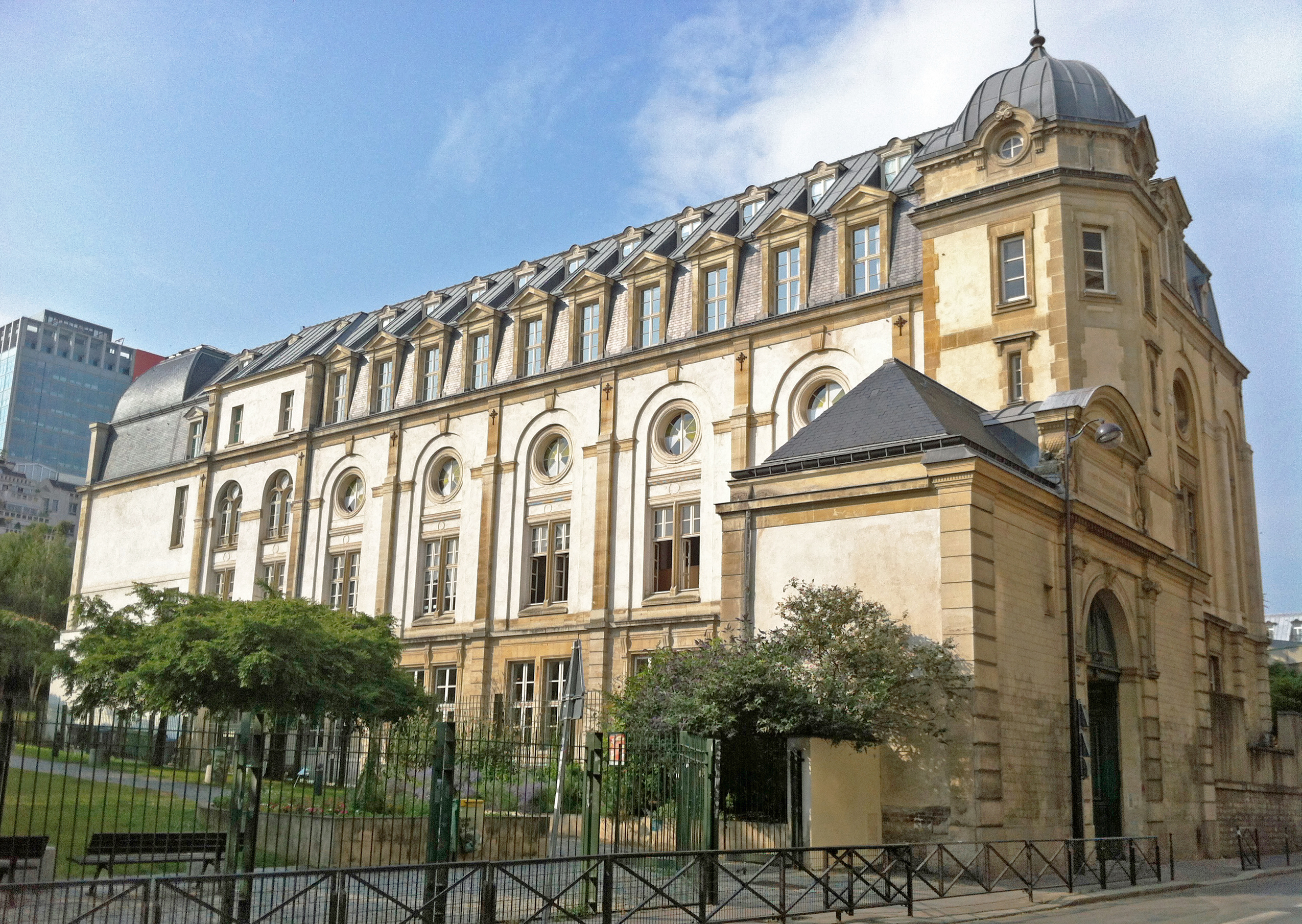
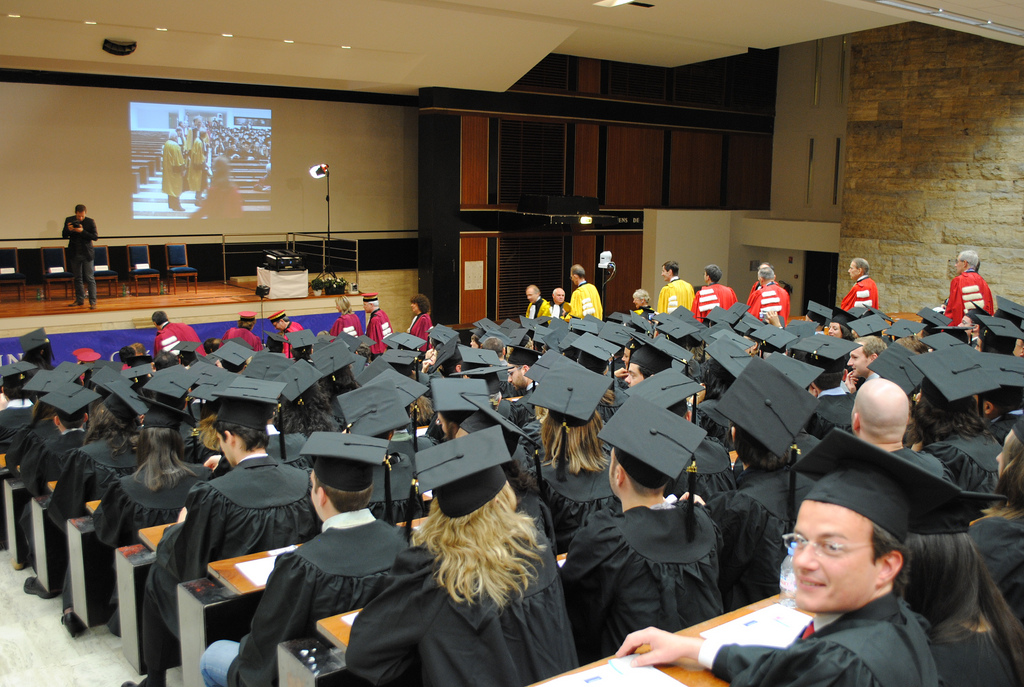
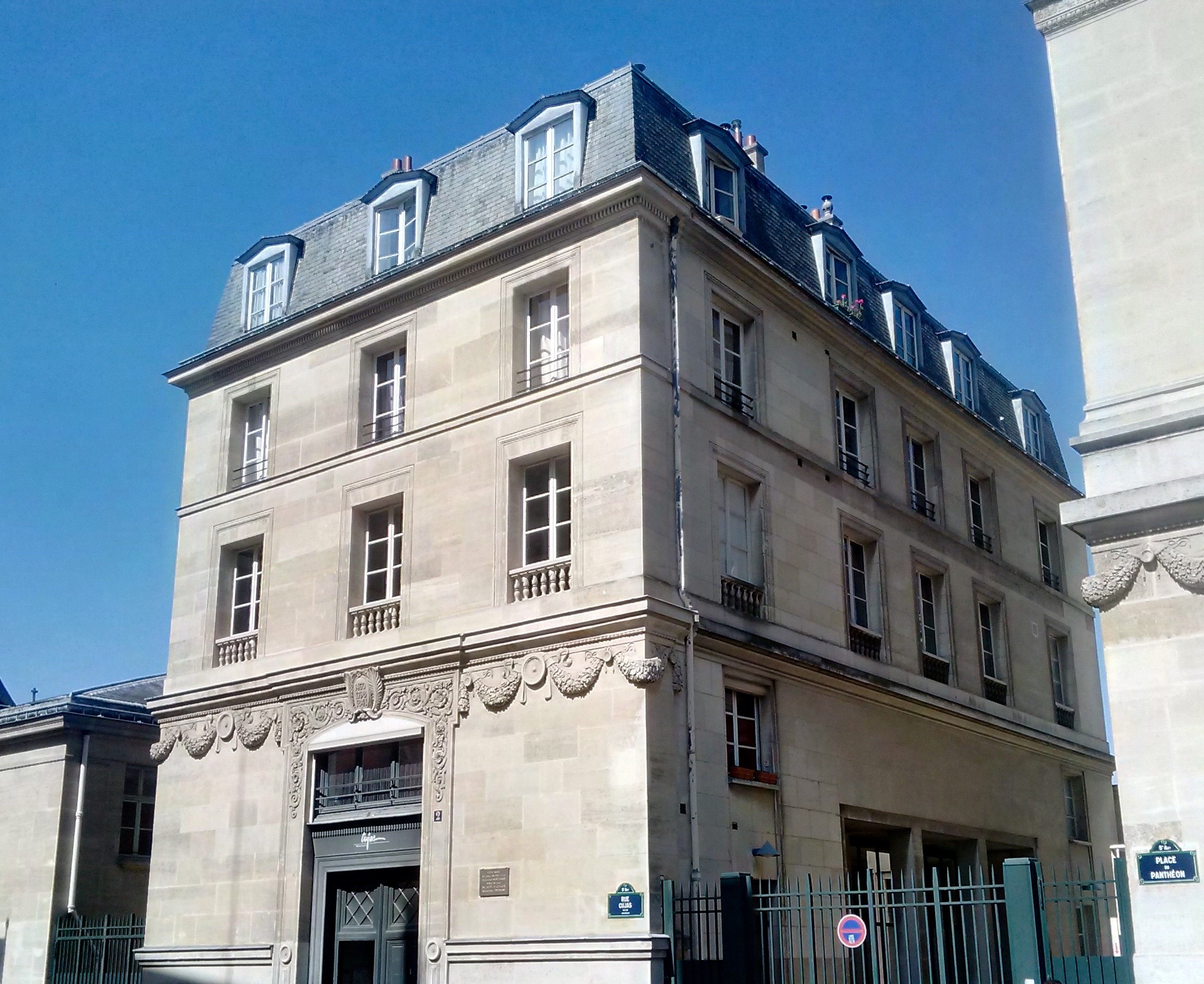
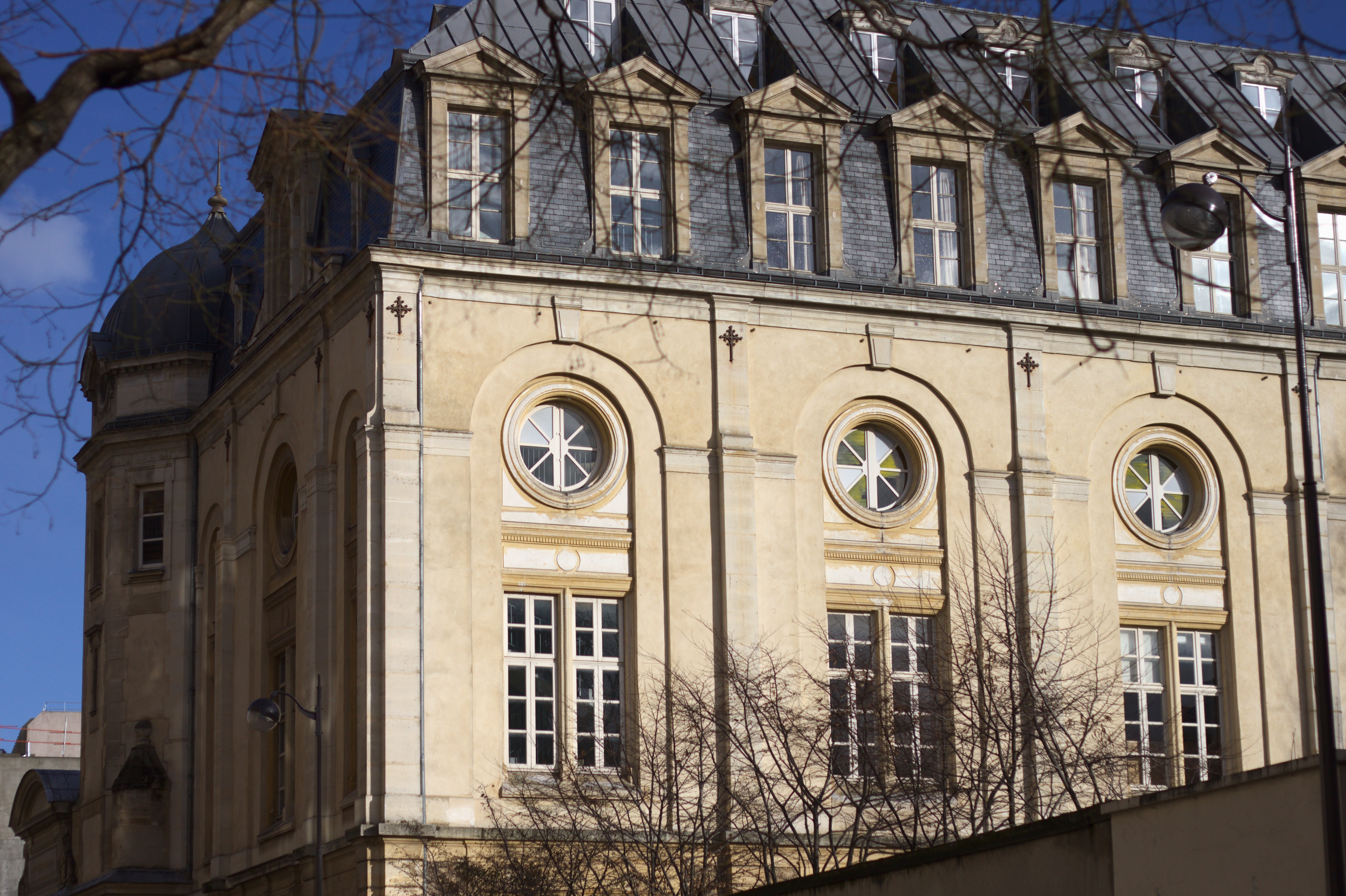
- Other name: Assas University
- Former names: 1990–2021: Université Paris II Panthéon-Assas; 1971–1990: Université de droit, d’économie et de sciences sociales de Paris; 1950s–1970: Faculté de droit et d’économie de Paris; 1802–1950s: Faculté de droit de Paris; 1679–1793: Faculté de droit civil et canonique 12th Century–1679: Consultissima decretorum
- Type: Public
- Established: 1971 as Panthéon-Assas; 12th Century–1971: Faculty of Law of Paris
- Affiliations: Chancellery of the Universities of Paris; 4EU+ Alliance
- Budget: €91 million (2013)
- Chancellor: Bernard Beignier (Chancellor of the universities of Paris)
- President: Stéphane Braconnier
- Academic staff: 2,060
- Administrative staff: 356
- Students: 23,000
- Location: Paris, France
- Campus: Urban, Latin Quarter
- Colours: Red and white
- Website: assas-universite.fr

Paris-Panthéon-Assas University, abbreviated as Assas University (French: Université Paris-Panthéon-Assas) and commonly known as Assas or Paris 2, is a public research university in Paris, France.

It is considered the direct successor of the Faculty of Law of Paris, the second-oldest faculty of Law in the world, founded in the 12th century. Following the 1970 split of the University of Paris, often referred to as the 'Sorbonne', in the aftermath of the May 68 events, law professors faced decisions regarding the future of their faculty. Out of 108 law professors, 88 elected to sustain the legacy of the Faculty of Law of Paris by establishing a new university dedicated to the study of law. The university is housed within the same two buildings that previously accommodated the Faculty of Law of Paris.

Panthéon-Assas, now an independent university, continues to offer the law courses associated with Sorbonne University, having declined to officially integrate as one of its faculties.

The majority of the 19 centres of Panthéon-Assas are located in the Latin Quarter university campus, with the main buildings on Place du Panthéon (Panthéon Centre) and Rue d'Assas (Assas Centre), hence its current name. The university is composed of five departments specializing in law, political science, economics, journalism and media studies, and public and private management, and it hosts 24 research centres and five specialized doctoral schools. Every year, the university enrolls approximately 18,000 students, including more than 3,000 international students.

== History ==
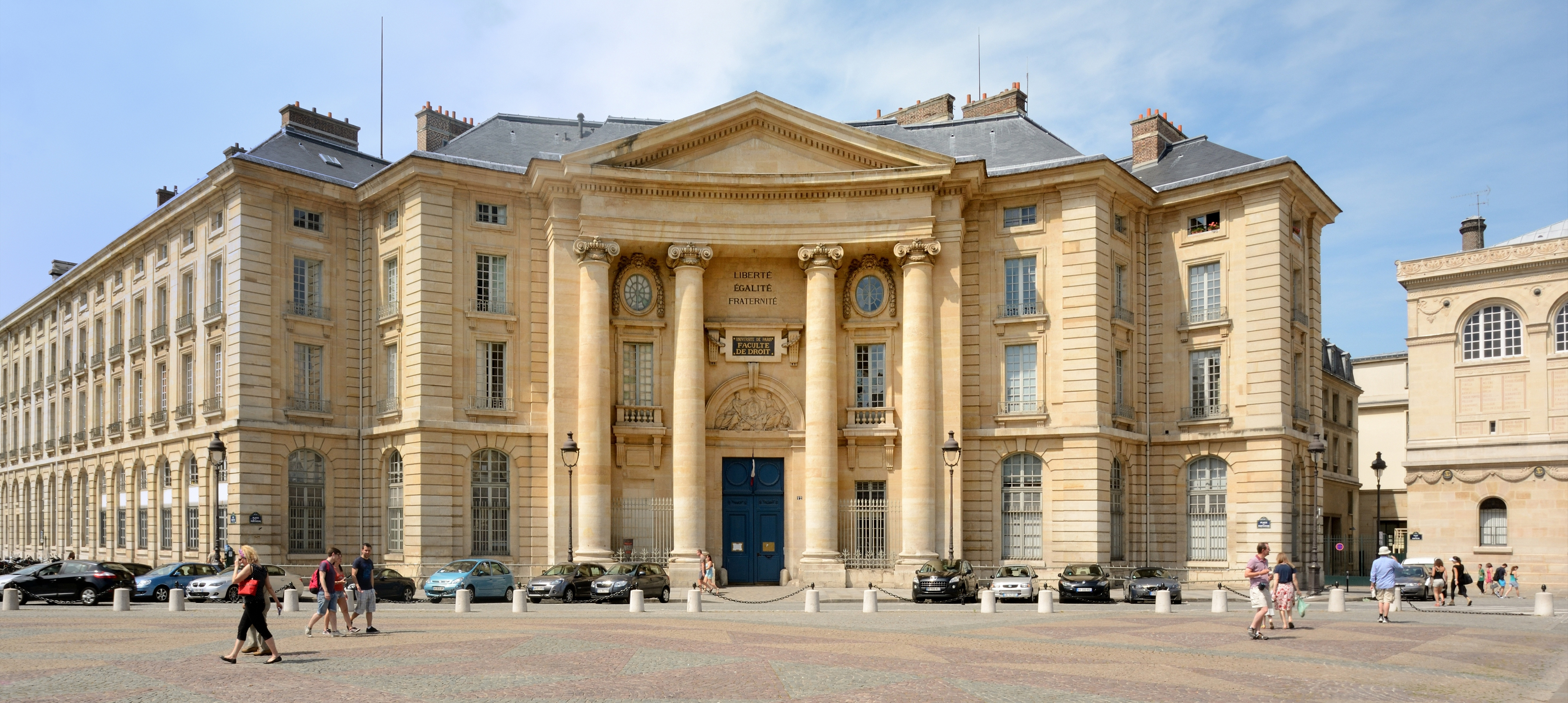
Façade of the main building, Place du Panthéon

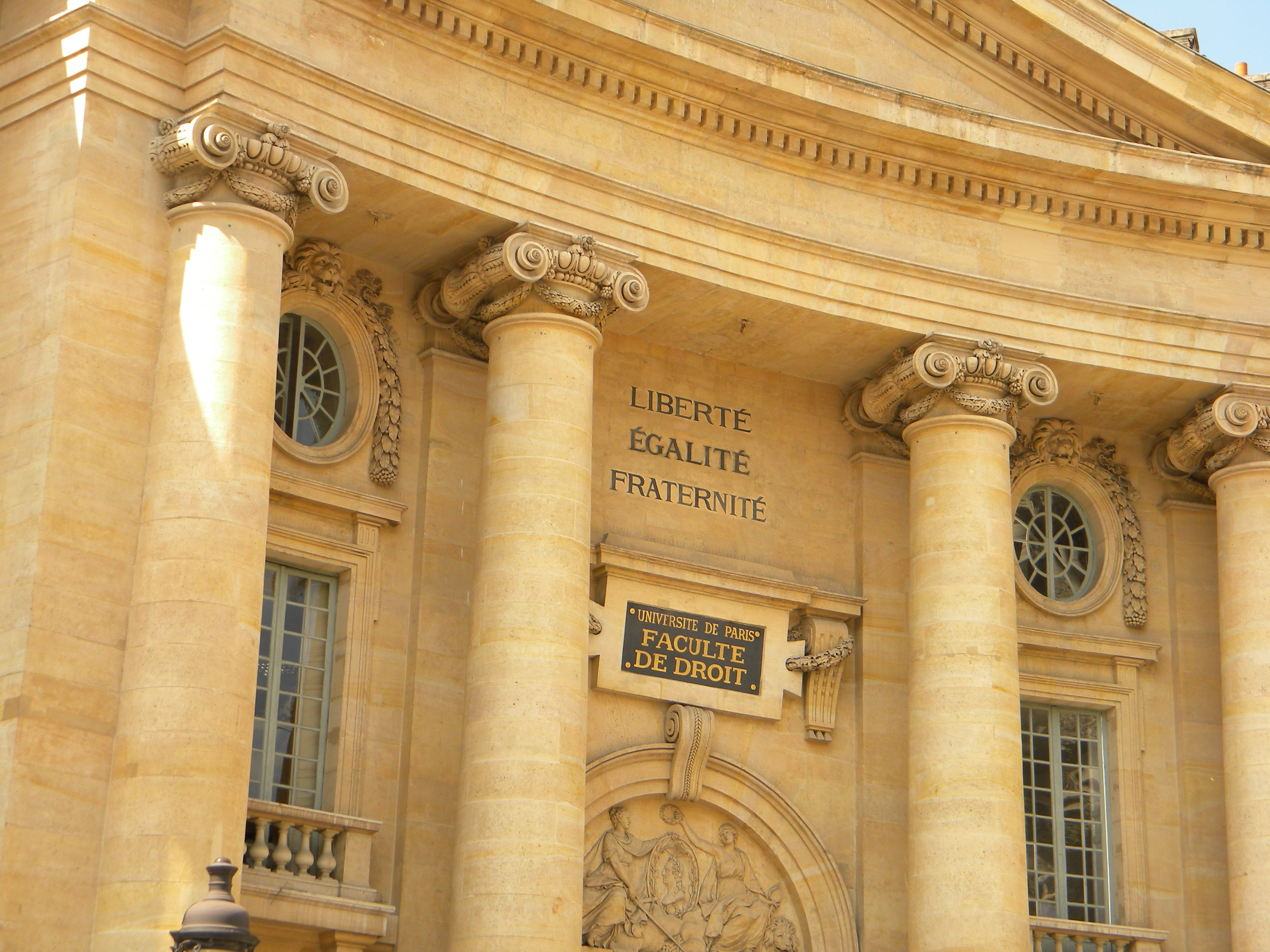
Close-up view of the main entrance to the Centre Panthéon

The University of Paris, commonly referred to as the 'Sorbonne', was founded in the middle of the 12th century and officially ceased to exist on 31 December 1970, following the student protests of 1968. Following the University of Paris split, the majority of law professors, 88 out of 108, opted to maintain the essence of the Faculty of Law of Paris by reestablishing it as a new university. In pursuit of this ambition, they founded along with professors of economics the 'University of law, economics and social sciences of Paris' (Université de droit, d'économie et de sciences sociales de Paris), and kept in it the same buildings with the same research centers. Panthéon-Assas is considered today as direct inheritor of the Faculty of Law of Paris.

The official name of the university was changed to 'Paris II Panthéon-Assas University' in 1990. The name Panthéon-Assas is a reference to the main addresses of the pre-1968 Faculty of Law of Paris, which are now part of the university; namely, the buildings on Place du Panthéon and Rue d'Assas. The university is also referred to as 'Assas' or 'Paris II,' 'Sorbonne-Assas' and 'Sorbonne Law School'.

After the creation of a new Sorbonne University, to which Panthéon-Assas provides law courses in joint degrees, Sorbonne University wanted to integrate Panthéon-Assas as a faculty of law but Panthéon-Assas preferred to remain an independent university within the Sorbonne system.

In 2022, its official name became Paris-Panthéon-Assas University.

== Administration ==
Panthéon-Assas is governed by an administration council, a scientific council, and a council for studies and university life. Members of these boards serve two-year terms. The president of Panthéon-Assas is elected by members of the administration council, for a four-year tenure;. The president presides over the administration council.

The president is assisted by two vice-presidents and several professors elected within their respective academic departments. Members of the administration council choose the faculty representatives who make up the scientific council.

The university inherited the academic departments from the Faculty of Law of Paris. It currently houses five of them: one for private law and criminal sciences, one for public law and political science, one for Roman law and legal history, one for economics and management, and one for journalism and communication. (Note: The Savary bill of 1984 aimed at centering universities on "education and research units" (French: unités de formation et de recherche) which match academic departments— offering both undergraduate and graduate programs—to research centres. Panthéon-Assas comprises six of these units: one for first cycle and basic legal qualification in law and political science, one for second and third cycles in law and political science, one for economics and management, one for private and public management, the French Press Institute, and the Institute of Judicial Studies.)

== Campuses ==
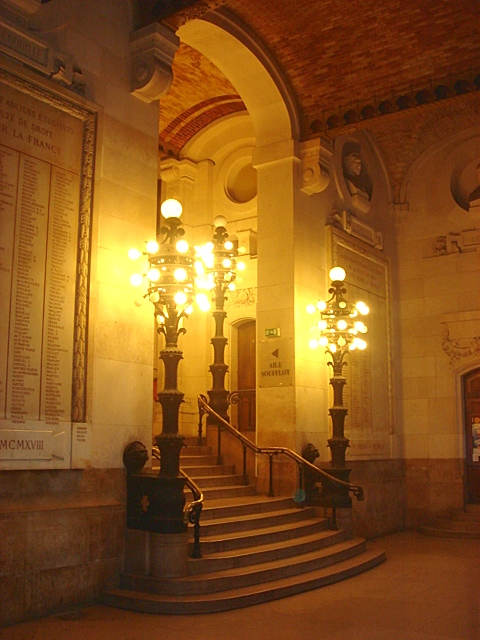
Inside the south wing of the Panthéon Centre facing the Jardin du Luxembourg

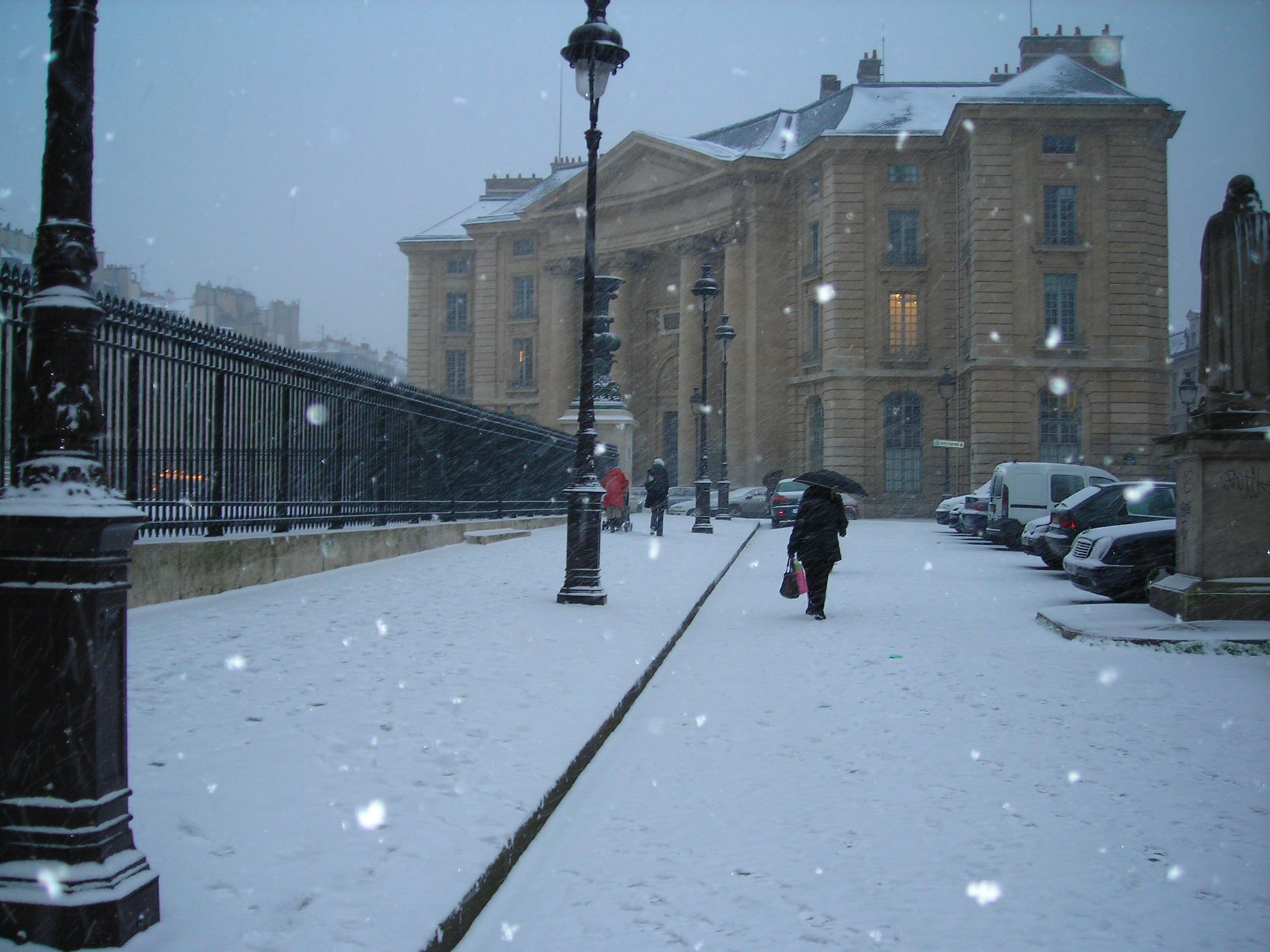
Panthéon Centre in winter

The university has 18 campuses in Paris, 1 in the city of Melun to the south, and other campuses abroad.

=== Panthéon Centre ===
In 1753, Louis XV decided that a new building would be constructed for the Faculty of Law of Paris. Jacques-Germain Soufflot, alumnus of the Faculty who had become the architect of the King designed and supervised the construction. It took place from 1771 to 1773 and the new building opened in 1774.

Nowadays, the administration offices and postgraduate studies (master's and doctoral studies) are located in it. It is situated at 12 Place du Panthéon. It is registered among the national heritage sites of France.

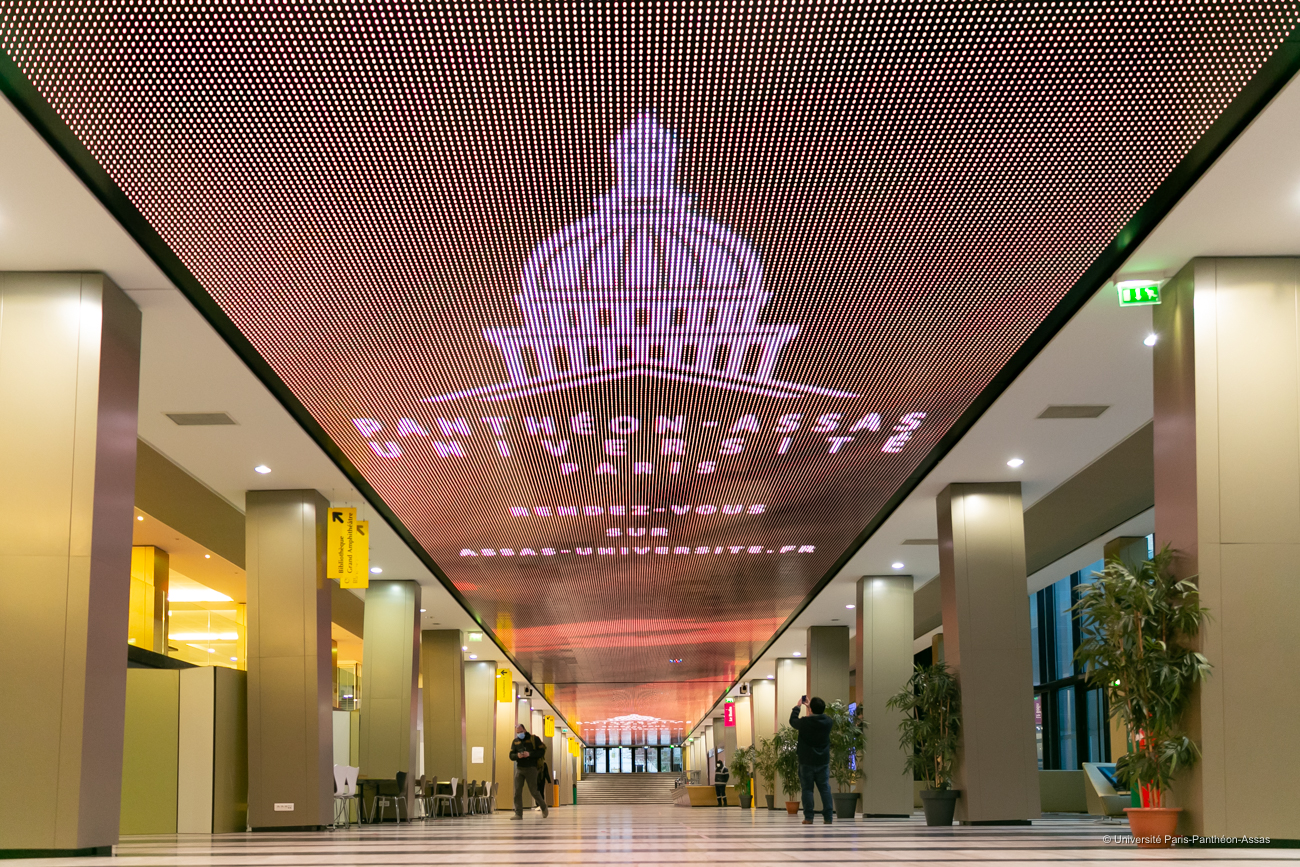
Entrance at night

=== Assas Centre ===
History under the Faculty of Law of Paris

The largest campus of Panthéon-Assas is located on Rue d'Assas and receives second-year to four-year law students. It was designed by Charles Lemaresquier, Alain le Normand, and François Carpentier to accommodate the growing number of students at the University of Paris. It was built between 1959 and 1963 on the former grounds of Société Marinoni. At the time of its inauguration, its main lecture theatre was the largest in France, with 1,700 seats.

Renovation and expansion in the 21st century

Centre Assas building, which was going under renovation between 2007 and 2017, has been completely redesigned and now hosts a modern learning center, created by the architect Alain Sarfati.

Cultural events

The Assas building has been hosting concerts of classical music for decades. Herbert von Karajan, Leonard Bernstein, Georg Solti, Elisabeth Schwarzkopf, Dietrich Fischer-Dieskau, Martha Argerich, Gundula Janowitz, Christa Ludwig, Alfred Brendel, Arthur Rubinstein, Seiji Ozawa, Carlo Maria Giulini, or Samson François, among others, have performed in it. The 28th edition of the International Piano Competition for Outstanding Amateurs was held in it in 2017.

The scene at the Cairo airport from OSS 117: Cairo, Nest of Spies was filmed in its entrance hall.

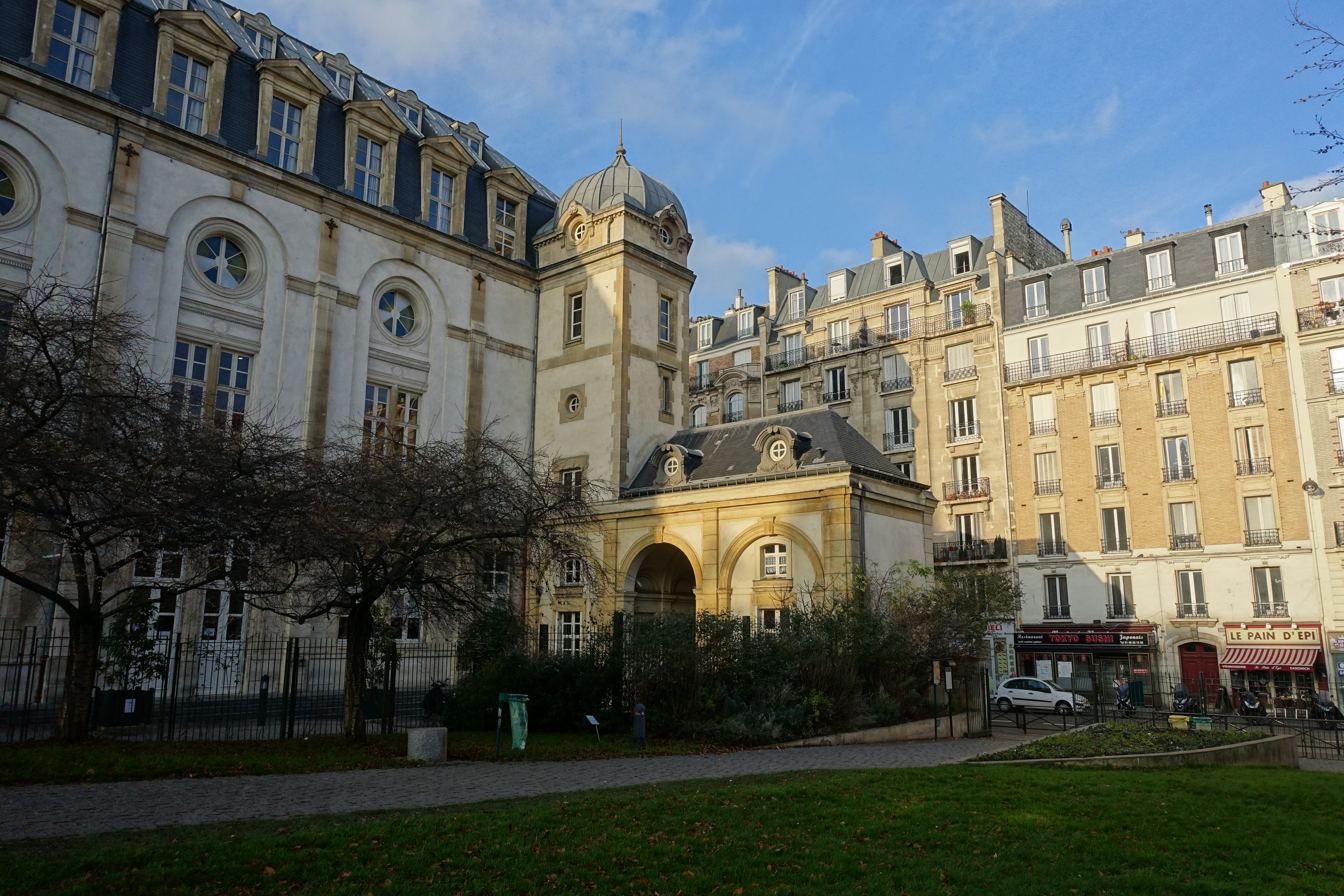
Campus on the Rue de Vaugirard

=== Vaugirard Centre ===
The campus on the Rue de Vaugirard provides for first-year students. It is located in the chapel wing of the former Jesuit College of the Immaculate Conception, where Charles de Gaulle was a pupil; the chapel itself, dating from the 18th century, was transformed into a lecture hall in the 1980s. The structure is a national heritage site.

=== Sainte Barbe Centre ===
The Center of Roman Law and Legal History of Panthéon-Assas, hosting its research centers in legal history, is situated inside the Collège Sainte-Barbe, former school founded in 1460. The school was founded by Pierre Antoine Victor de Lanneau, teacher of religious studies, as a college of the University of Paris. Ignace de Loyola, Gustave Eiffel, Alfred Dreyfus among others were students there.

=== Melun Campus ===
The campus in the town of Melun hosts local first-year students. It is located in the old town of Melun, on Saint-Étienne Island, among Roman and Gothic remains. The Institute of Law and Economics of Pantheon-Assas University is located there. An extension is currently under construction.

=== Abroad ===
Panthéon-Assas also has campuses in Singapore, Mauritius, and Dubai.

=== Others ===
The campus on Rue Charcot receives third-year and master students in economics.

== Research ==
=== Research centres ===
The university inherited the research centers from the Faculty of Law of Paris. Originally, the Faculty was not organized around research centers and professors were pursuing their research as part of Faculty in general. Hence, only newly emerging fields of research would have newly created institutes, whereas traditional subjects such as Roman law and legal history, private law in general and public law in general, would not necessarily have ones.

Currently, among the research centers at Panthéon-Assas, there are:

- the Institute of Legal History, which is one of the largest research centers in Roman law and legal history in Europe. It hosts the Société d'histoire du droit (Legal History Society, for French legal historians), created in 1913 by professors of legal history at the Faculty of Law of Paris. Created in 2001 as such, the Institute of Legal History regroups the Centre de Documentation des Droits Antiques, created in 1962, the Centre d'Histoire des Institutions and the Centre d'Études d'Histoire Juridique, created in 1953. It is now also attached to the French National Centre for Scientific Research (CNRS) and to the French National Archives.
- the Centre for Administrative and Political Science Studies and Research (CERSA), also attached to the CNRS.
- the Paris Centre in Law and Economics (CRED), created in 2014.
- the Institute of Higher International Studies (IHEI), serving as the university's research center for international law and international relations, founded in 1921 by Paul Fauchille and Albert de Lapradelle, and considered one of Europe's finest.
- the Paris Institute of Criminology and Criminal Law, founded in 1922, the oldest research center in criminal law of France.
- the Paris Institute of Comparative Law, founded in 1931 by Henri Capitant and Henri Lévy-Ullmann.
- the French Press Institute, founded in 1937 at the Faculty of Law of Paris by Boris Mirkine-Guetzevitch and Georges Bourdon (Secretary General of Unions of journalists). It is the first research center in journalism and media studies in France.
- the Research Center in Business Law, created in 1945 by Joseph Hamel.

Each research center usually has one or several research or professional Master of Laws programs (LL.M.) attached to it.

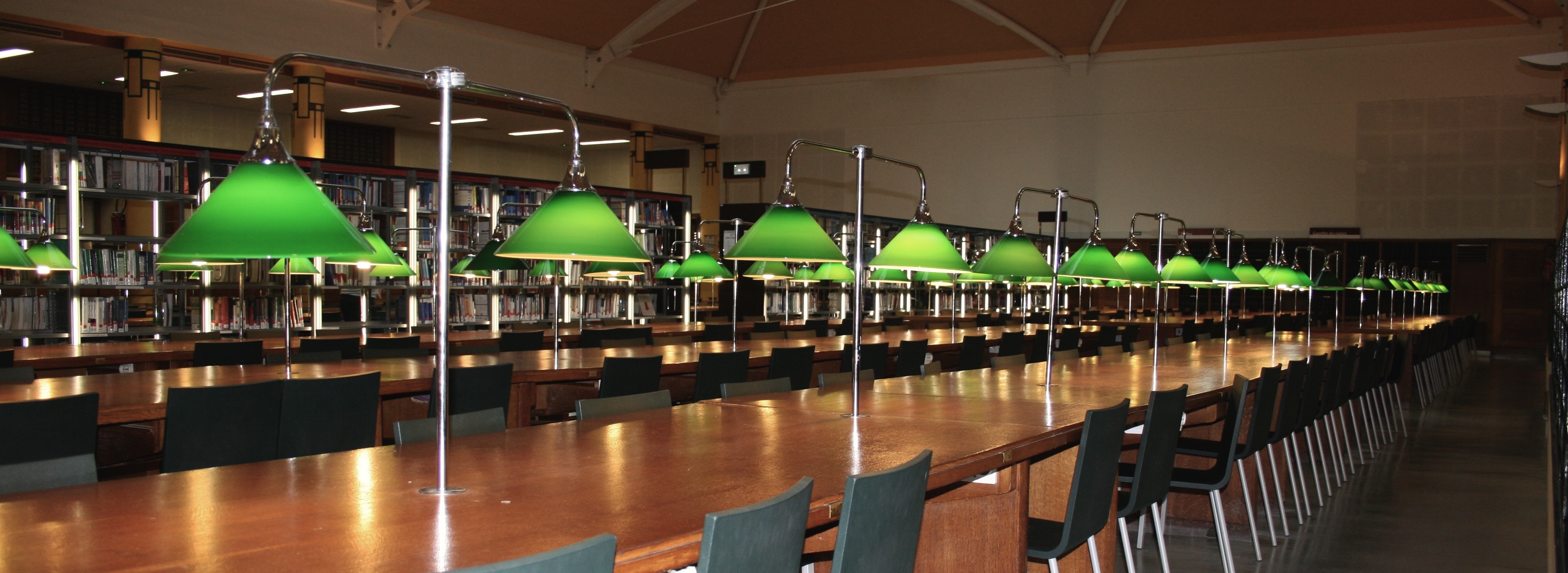
Reading room of the Cujas Library, Paris

=== Libraries ===
The campuses at Rue d'Assas, Rue de Vaugirard, and Melun host the university libraries, which are open to all the students. The university's research centres, institutes and reading rooms host twenty-two more specialized libraries. The total seating area of the university's libraries spans over 3,500 m^{2}, and the university's collections gather over three hundred thousand volumes together.

The new library at Centre Assas has been designed by the architect Alain Sarfati and has furniture designed by Philippe Starck.

Professors and students also have free access to Cujas Library, which is the largest law library in Europe and to general research and study libraries in Paris, including the Sainte-Geneviève Library or the French National Library.

=== Journals and publications ===
The university's publishing house, Éditions Panthéon-Assas, was established in 1998.

Panthéon-Assas hosts several faculty-led publications in French: Jus Politicum (Political Law Journal) since 2008, the Revue de droit d'Assas (Assas Law Review) since 2010 and Droits fondamentaux (Human Rights Journal) since 2012. They are all available online.

It also hosts a faculty-led publication in English, the Sorbonne-Assas Law Review, since 2012.

== Programs, schools and graduate schools ==
=== Programs ===
==== Undergraduate admissions ====
University–wide (law, economics, management, media...), the university has an acceptance rate of 20%. 22.79% of students accepted by the university having received highest honors ("mention très bien") in high school during the 2019 session (second university in France, behind Paris 1 with 22.84%).

In Law, within the department of Law, in 2021, the rate of "with honors" and "with highest honors" mentions among the admitted students was 95% (first among undergraduate programs in France).

==== Graduate programs (Master's or LL.M.s) ====
The four historical Master of Laws or LL.M. of the Faculty of Law of Paris were the Master's in: 1° Roman Law and History of Law, 2° Private Law, 3° Public Law and, starting 1964, 4°Criminal Law. (Note: The origin of this degree lies in the "doctorate courses" that existed in legal studies in France until they were replaced in 1925 by the Diplôme d'études supérieures en France ("DES"). The Decree of the 2 May 1925 created in each faculty of Law 4 DES: DES in Legal History Roman Law, DES in Private Law, DES in public Law and DES in Politics and Economics. It required students to obtain two of them undergraduate studies to be able to begin a doctorate (PhD). In 1964, the undergraduate studies took 4 years (4-year licence, and eventually 3-year licence and a one-year maîtrise) and only one DES was necessary to begin a doctorate. 2 additional DES are created in each faculty: DES in Criminal Law and Politics and Economics are separated in two DES. The Decree of the 16 April 1974 replaced the DES with the Diplôme d'études approfondies ("DEA") for research and afterwards the Diplôme d'études supérieures spécialisées ("DESS") for professional orientation. Additional LL.M. degrees (DESS or DEA) are created. In 2005, with the Bologna Process, these two degrees are replaced with a second year of Master ("Master 2") degree with a selection of students among the general pool of students in France after the first year of Master ("Master 1", following the 3-year licence). "Master 2" programs are sometimes divided between the Master 2 Research (inheritors of the DEA programs) and the Master 2 Professional (inheritors of the DESS). In 2021, Paris II followed new government rules to select students after the 3-year licence to do a two-year master's degree with specific "parcours" ("paths") in second year (corresponding to the LL.M.). The master’s degree is mandatory to pursue a PhD degree.) They are now rebranded as "Master 2" or "Parcours" (meaning a second-year "path", within a 2-year master's), under the following names:

- LL.M. in History of Law, with the Institute of Legal History. Albert Rigaudière, member of the Académie des Inscriptions et des Belles Lettres, was its director.
- LL.M. in General Private Law, with the Civil Law Research Center. According to Le Nouvel Observateur, the LL.M. "considered as a star-degree of the faculty, long been the pet of headhunters, it trains the virtuosi of the law". Pierre Raynaud was its director at the Faculty of Law of Paris before 1970 and at Panthéon-Assas afterwards.
- LL.M. in Specialized Public Law. It was once directed by Yves Gaudemet, member of the Académie des sciences morales et politiques.
- LL.M. in Criminal Law, with the Institute of Criminology and Criminal Law of Paris.

Originally exclusively linked to research studies and doctoral studies, the 5th-year LL.M. is now part of the joint Master's program and has become the norm in France for lawyers (including barristers). They have become quite selective and in competition with one another, among all the programs in France. Many LL.M. programs have been created at Panthéon-Assas since the Decree of 16 April 1974 authorizing the creation of more specialized LL.M.s than the 4 original ones, most notably the LL.M. in International Law and LL.M. in Comparative Law. Most of Panthéon-Assas' LL.M.s enjoy a similar strong reputation in France and Europe.

==== International programs ====
Panthéon-Assas offers international integrated undergraduate programs (Bachelor-Double maîtrise) with universities such as Oxford University, University College London, King's College London, University College Dublin. It offers international integrated postgraduate programs (LL.M.-Master 2) with some universities such as, on top of the latter ones, Boston University, Humboldt University of Berlin, LMU Munich, Sapienza University of Rome, University of Padua.

Yale Law School and Panthéon-Assas signed in June 2011 an Agreement for Collaborative Activities to create an environment for long-term joint research, exchange and programming activities. They organize, together with the ESSEC Business School, a summer school in law and economics, the Yale-Paris II-Essec Summer School.

It created in 2011 the Sorbonne-Assas International Law School which have campuses in Paris, Singapore, Mauritius and Dubai.

Assas has cooperation agreements with 315 partner universities, including 113 Erasmus+ partners.

==== Joint academic programs ====
Panthéon-Assas offers several joint undergraduate and graduate programs with the Sorbonne University. It has also joint programs with other French universities and institutions such as INSEAD (Sorbonne University Alliance), Dauphine, PSL University, Mines Paris, PSL University, Sciences Po Paris, ESSEC Business School, CY Cergy Paris University or HEC Paris.

==== Online programs ====
In 2013, the university set up an e-learning platform, called Agor@ssas. It created that year a distance-learning undergraduate degree in law, the first and unique one in France. It is taught by professors from Panthéon-Assas and leads to exactly the same degree offerings the same rights. In addition, "e-students" have access to "e-tutors" to help them with pedagogical and administrative questions.

==== Preparatory schools ====
In July 2012, Panthéon-Assas became the first university in France to open preparatory school for the bar school entrance examination, which were until this point the monopoly of private preparatory schools. These courses were offered for a cheap price, and for free for students from low-income families (10% of the students of the preparatory school). This led private preparatory schools to plead unfair competition and the French courts ordered Panthéon-Assas to close the school. Today, the Bar preparation school is known as the IEJ-Institut d'Études Judiciaires "Pierre Reynaud".

Assas' Melun campus has been selected in 2021 by the French Government to host three preparatory schools "Prépa Talents".

=== Schools ===
==== Collège de droit and École de droit ====
On top of its core curriculum, Panthéon-Assas created in 2008 a special school for its best students, in order to give them special courses and a special degree: the Collège de droit ("College of Law"). To be admitted, "Summa Cum Laude" in Baccalauréat and success at an entrance test are needed. Each class is composed of around 100 students, now selected among the whole France each year. The Collège de droit was the first college of law created by a French University in 2008.

In 2011, it created the two-year École de droit ("School of Law"), the continuity of the three-year College of Law. An additional year abroad is mandatory to obtain the École de droit diploma degree.

Panthéon-Assas University being considered as the top faculty of law in France, media focused particularly on it and called even more this curriculum a "way of excellence".

==== Institut français de presse ====
The Institut français de presse (in English: French Press Institute), is the unit of Training and Research in Media, Communication and Journalism since 1970. Founded in 1937 in the Faculty of Law of Paris, the Institut des Sciences de la Presse (Press Sciences Institute) became the Institut français de presse in 1951. The department is the oldest and one of the finest French schools in the field of communication and journalism studies, in particular with Sorbonne University's CELSA in Neuilly.

==== Other ====
- Institut de préparation à l'administration générale de Paris;
- Institut d'études judiciaires Pierre Raynaud;
- Maison des sciences de gestion.

=== Graduate and affiliated schools ===
==== Centre de Formation des Journalistes ====
The Centre de formation des journalistes (in English: CFJ Graduate School of Journalism) is the Journalism Graduate school (Grande école) of the university, located in the heart of the 12th arrondissement. The graduate school is a member of the Conférence des Grandes écoles and recognized by the profession of journalists. The CFJ has trained a large number of great journalists (Bernard Pivot, David Pujadas, Florence Aubenas, Pierre Lescure ...), and attracts each year nearly a thousand candidates for around fifty places.

==== École Française d'Électronique et d'Informatique ====
The École française d'électronique et d'informatique (EFREI, in English: French School of Electronics and Computer Science) is the engineering school of Training and Research in Computer Science and Management, located in Villejuif, Greater Paris.

==== Institut Supérieur d'Interprétation et de Traduction ====
The Institut supérieur d'interprétation et de traduction (ISIT, in English: Higher Institute of Interpretation and Translation) is the Graduate school of Training and Research in Intercultural Management and Communication, located in the Centre Assas campus, in the 6th arrondissement.

==== École W ====
The W School of Journalism and Communication (in French: École W) is the college that primarily offers a multidisciplinary undergraduate programme in Media, Journalism, Communication, Marketing, Storytelling and Design, founded by the Centre de Formation des Journalistes de Paris in 2016. Located in the 12th arrondissement with the CFJ, the college also offers graduate programmes in Design, Marketing and Communication and has prestigious partnerships with EMLyon Business School, EDHEC Business School, Catholic University of Lille and the École de design Nantes Atlantique, Nantes University.

== Reputation and rankings ==
=== Reputation ===
Assas has reputation of "excellence" in Law and has been called by Le Monde des grandes écoles a "symbol of Made in France excellence".

The French Research and Higher Education Evaluation Agency stated in 2013: "Paris II University presents itself as a university of excellence. This claim is not abusive. The university occupies – in Paris, in France, in the European Union and, more broadly, in the international scientific community – a prominent place. The university's reputation and notoriety has not been usurped. They are based on teaching and research activities as well as publications whose quality is recognized and celebrated in academia. And this beyond frontiers."

=== Rankings ===
University rankings

Global – Overall
- QS World: 1001-1200 (2026)

Global – Law
- QS Law: 101-150 (2026)

Law

Panthéon-Assas University is often described as the "top law school in France". It is ranked first of France in law in the French Eduniversal rankings, Le Figaro ranking and Thotis ranking. It is the only French university and one of the two French higher education institution to make it into the GreenMetrics ranking.

Le Figaro Étudiant has published, for the first time in 2023, a ranking of the top 30 universities in France in law. The ranking takes into account several criteria, including the high school graduation results of admitted students, the number of applicants for undergraduate programs, post-graduation salary, the number of PhD degrees awarded and the number of alumni who become professors. Paris-Panthéon-Assas University has secured the first position in the ranking and stands out from other universities.

Most of the students admitted at the French National School for the Judiciary come from Panthéon-Assas, more than 40% in 2011 (candidates who graduated from Panthéon-Assas and then passed the entrance exam elsewhere are not included in that number).

Assas graduates have the highest salary of all French law schools.

Economics and business

The Assas undergraduate program in economics ranked fifth in 2020 by Eduniversal.

Assas was in 2011 the second best-ranked university in France (behind Paris-Dauphine University) for its master's degrees in the business fields. In 2016, it was ranked the first in France for international business, also first in decisional computing and second in finance and banking.

Journalism

Assas's CFJ diploma in journalism ranked third in France in 2022 by Le Figaro.

Political Science

According to the Thotis ranking of political science bachelor's degrees in 2025, the Assas bachelor's degree in political science is considered the second best in France, along with that of Université Paris 1 Panthéon Sorbonne.

== Notable people from this faculty ==
This section is about notable faculty from Panthéon-Assas University (since 1971). The dates are the dates of professorship at the Faculty of Law of Paris and at University of Paris-Panthéon Assas.

=== Law reformers ===
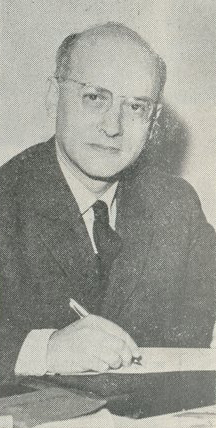
Jean Foyer, writer of the Constitution of the Fifth Republic and Minister of Justice of Charles de Gaulle.

Among the professors of Panthéon-Assas who reformed French or foreign laws, there are:

- Jean Foyer, who was a close advisor of the Général de Gaulle, one of the main writers of the Constitution of the Fifth Republic, Minister of Justice under Charles de Gaulle and who put in motion important reforms of many parts of French Law (family, ownership and business, nationality, etc.).
- Jean Carbonnier (1955–1976), who reformed huge parts of the French Civil Code in the 1960s and 1970s, and especially in family law.
- Gérard Cornu (1967-...), who wrote the new French Code of Civil Procedure in the late 1970s and is also well known in France for his Dictionary of Legal Vocabulary, translated in English.
- Serge Guinchard, head of the first Judicial Studies Institutes of France (in Panthéon-Assas) in the 1990s and head of several governmental commissions for criminal procedure and criminal law reforms in the 2000s in France, Senegal and for the Council of Europe.
- Pierre Catala, who reformed inheritance law and law of donations with Jean Carbonnier in the 2000s, and who initiated the reform of French contract law, tort Law and law of evidence, and was the head of the official committee for its reform
- François Terré (1969–1999), president in 2008 of the legal section of the Académie des sciences morales et politiques, head of the private committee for the reform of French Law of Obligations.
- Jean-Claude Martinez (1983–...), special advisor of King Hassan II of Morocco supervising the creation of the first Moroccan Tax Code

=== Members of the Institut de France ===
The Institut de France is a learned society which was created as such in 1795 and maintained close links with Napoléon Bonaparte. It regroups 5 Académies, by subject (Science, Arts and the 3 other listed below).

- Suzanne Bastid, faculty of Panthéon-Assas and first woman professor of law of France, has been the first female member of the Institut de France.

Among its members or former members, there are:

- Académie des sciences morales et politiques (Philosophy, Law and Politics): Suzanne Bastid, Prosper Weil, François Terré, Pierre Delvolvé, Yves Gaudemet, Henri Mazeaud (1939–...), Roland Drago and Louis Vogel. Suzanne Bastid and François Terré have both served as presidents of the Académie.
- Académie des inscriptions et belles-lettres (History), created in 1663 by Jean-Baptiste Colbert under Louis XIV: Albert Rigaudière.
- Académie Française (Language), created in 1635 by the cardinal de Richelieu: Georges Vedel.

=== Judiciary ===
Among faculties that had prominent positions in the Judiciary, there are:

- Georges Vedel (1949–1979), former member of the Constitutional Council of France.
- Jacques Robert (1969–1979), former member of the Constitutional Council of France.
- Philippe Ardant, former President of the Constitutional Court of the Principality of Andorra and former president of the Arab World Institute.
- Dominique Chagnollaud, former member of the Supreme Court of Monaco.

=== Presidents of university ===
To this day, Panthéon-Assas has been governed by ten presidents. The founding president, Berthold Goldman, a jurist, was succeeded by Jacques Robert, former member of the Constitutional Council of France, who was followed by Jean Boulouis, a private law jurist. Next came another private law jurist, Georges Durry, followed by Philippe Ardant, former president of the Constitutional Court of the Principality of Andorra and former president of the Arab World Institute. Panthéon-Assas was then presided by Bernard Teyssié, a specialist in social law, who was succeeded by Jacqueline Dutheil de la Rochère, a public international law scholar. She was followed by Louis Vogel, a private law jurist. He implemented numerous innovations, the aim of which has been to adapt the education given at the university to the needs of the 21st century. He was elected head of the Presidents of Universities of France Society in 2010. Guillaume Leyte, a legal historian, was elected president of the university on 20 June 2012, and reelected in 2016. On 30 November 2020, Stéphane Braconnier, a public law professor, was elected as the new president of the university, succeeding Guillaume Leyte.

=== Other ===
- Suzanne Bastid (1947–1977), the first woman professor of law of France, first woman to be a member of the Académie des sciences morales et politiques, secretary General of the Institute of International Law (Nobel peace prize 1904) and judge at the International Court of Justice.
- Henri Mazeaud (1939–1971), twin brother of Léon Mazeaud, resistant to Nazi Germany and deported to Buchenwald, honorary professor at Panthéon-Assas.
- Henri Batiffol, professor of private international law and professor at the Institute of International Law.
- Yves Lequette, professor of private law and private international law and professor at the Institute of International Law.
- Joe Verhoeven, former the general secretary of the Institute of International Law and honorary President of the Institute of Higher International Studies.
- Olivier Beaud, professor of public law.
- Gérard Cornu, author of the Dictionnaire de linguistique juridique.
- David Naccache, forensic expert at the International Criminal Court and member of the Computer Science Laboratory of the École normale supérieure.

=== Politics ===
Faculty members who have held prominent political positions include:

- Sébastien Lecornu, Prime Minister of France.
- Edmond Alphandéry, former French Minister of the Economy.
- Jean Foyer, former Minister of Justice.
- Roger-Gérard Schwartzenberg, former Minister for Research.
- Abderrazak Zouaoui, Tunisian Minister of the Economy.
- Hugues Portelli, member of the Senate of France.
- Roger-Gérard Schwartzenberg, member of the French Parliament (referred to as the French National Assembly), former Minister and former member of the European Parliament.
- Jean-Claude Martinez, member of the French Parliament and of the European Parliament.
- Nicole Catala, former member of the French National Assembly.
- Jean-Michel Blanquer, former Minister of Education joined the faculty in 2022 as professor of civil law.

== Notable alumni ==
This section is about notable alumni from Panthéon-Assas University (since 1971). To see a list of notable alumni of the Faculty of Law of Paris (before 1970), see that article.

=== Politics ===
==== France ====
Notable french alumni politicians

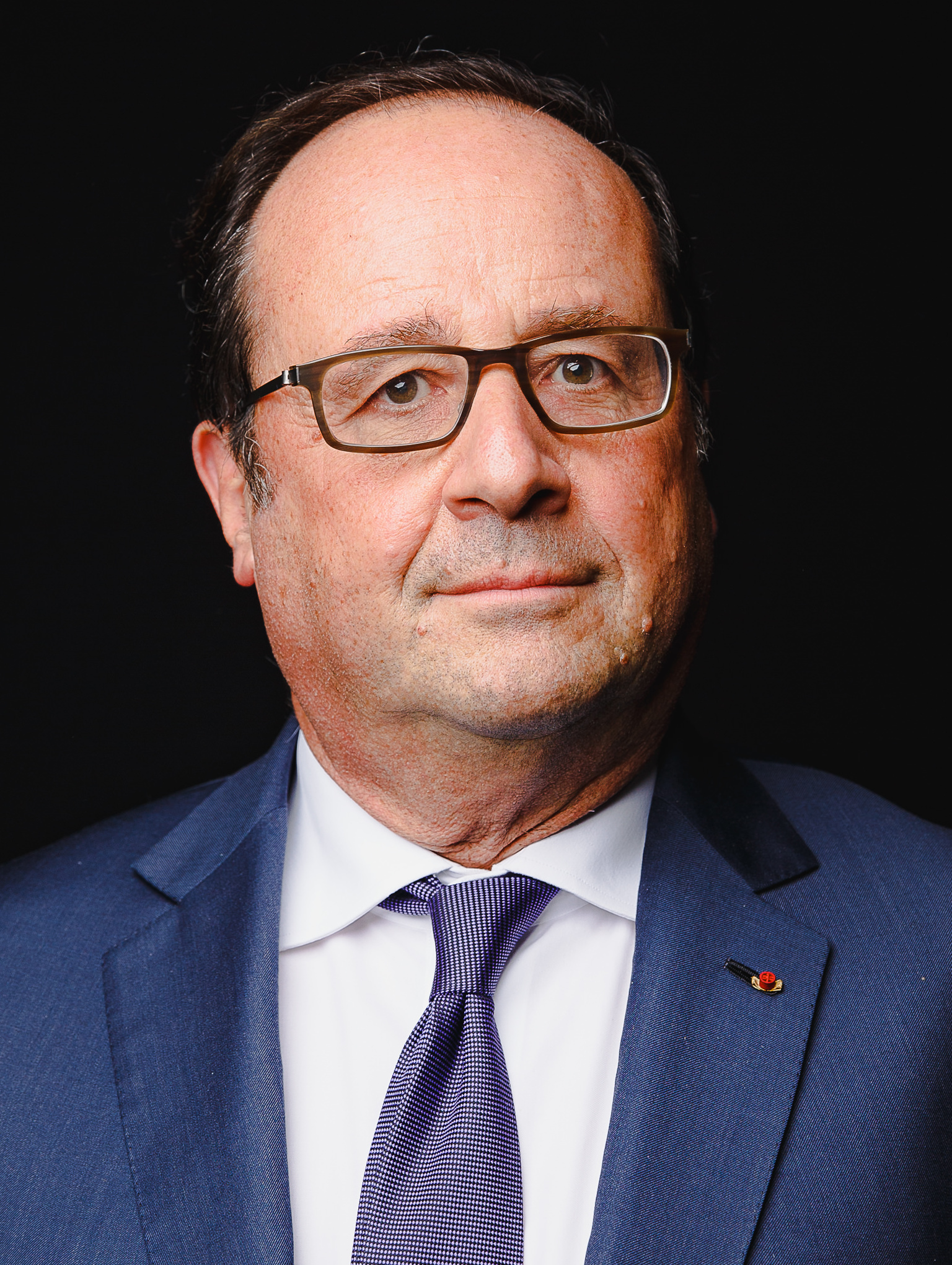
François Hollande

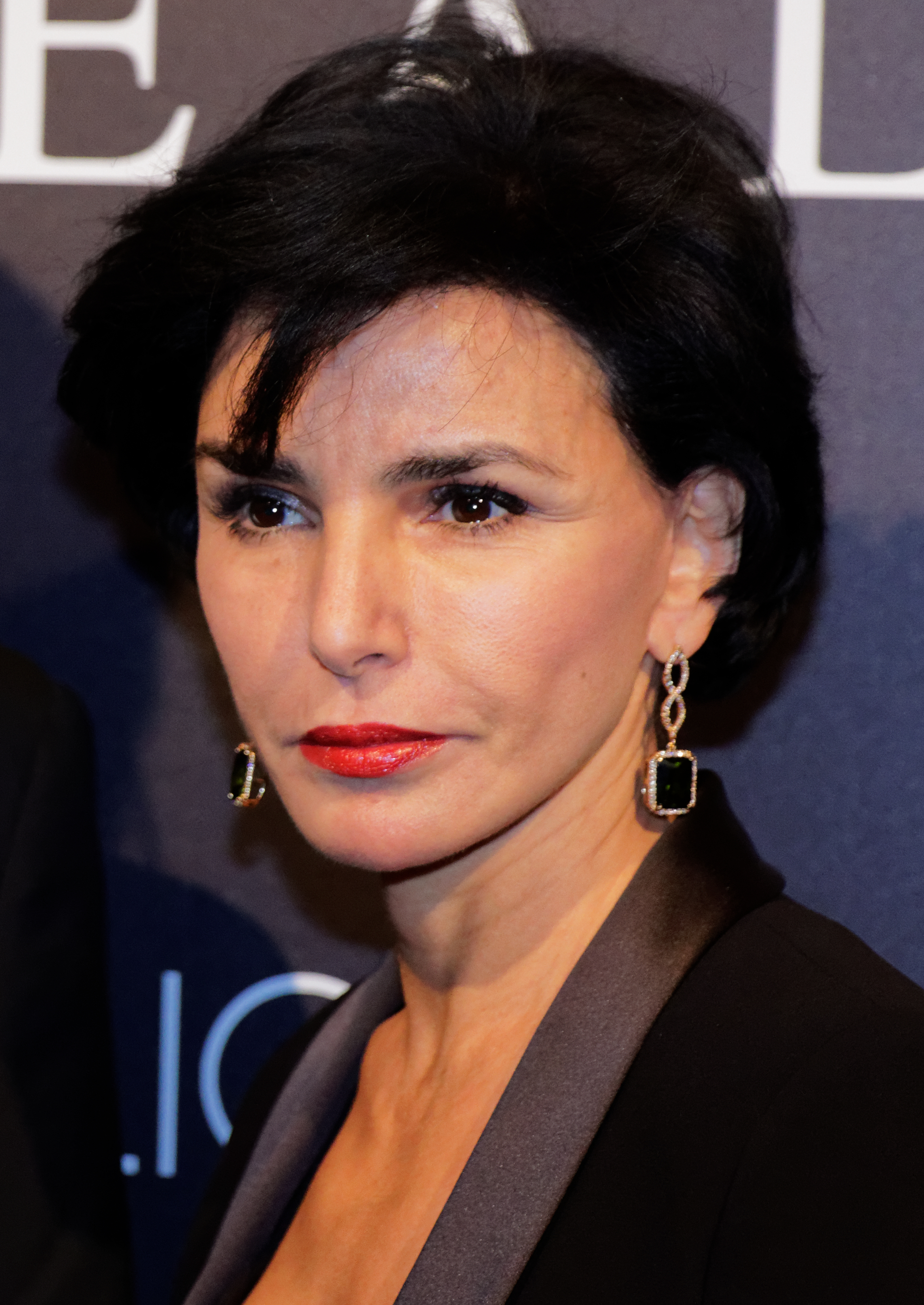
Rachida Dati

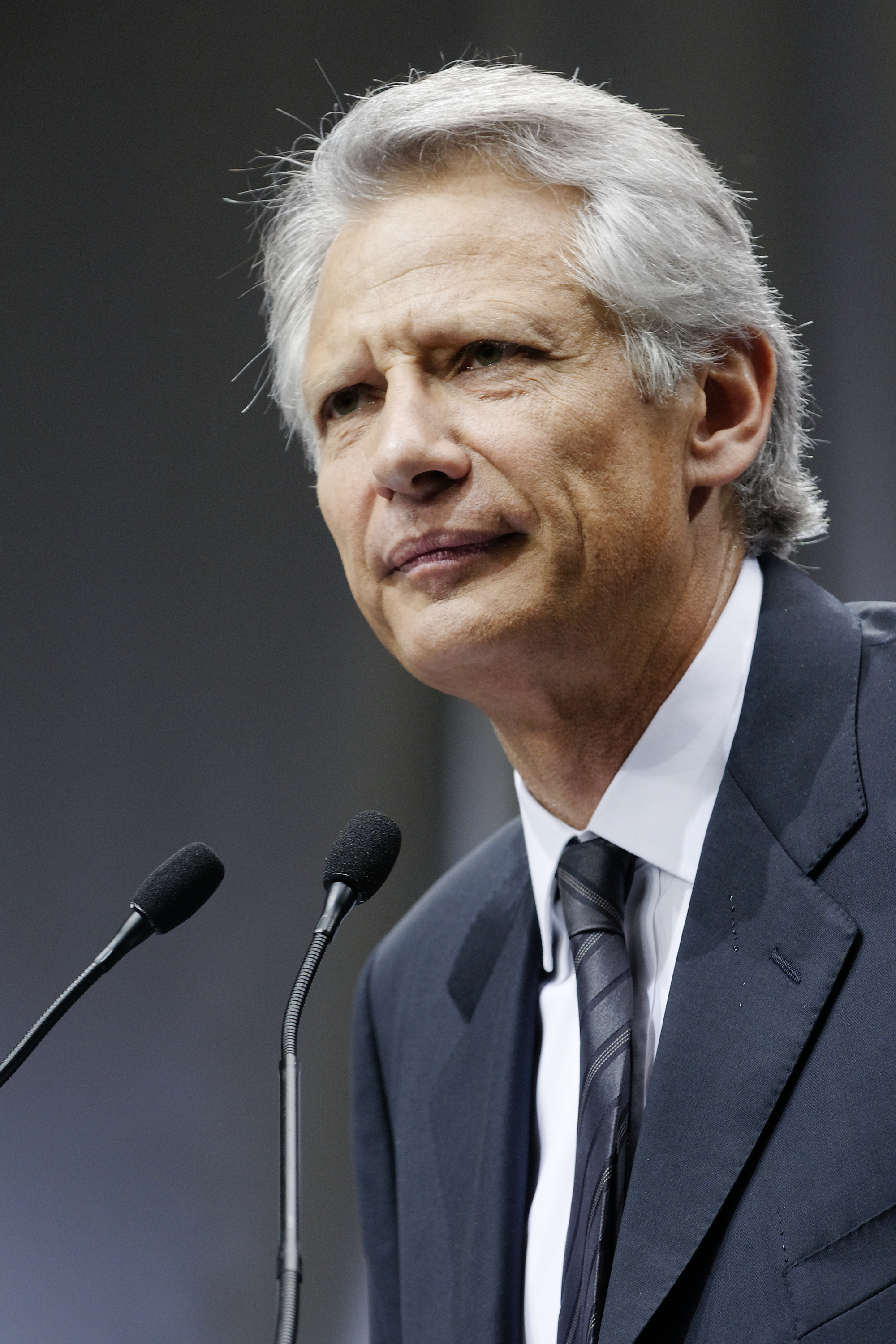
Dominique de Villepin

Among alumni of Paris II who had significant role in politics in France, there are:

- François Hollande, former President of France.
- Dominique de Villepin, former Prime Minister of France, former Minister of the Interior and former Minister of Foreign Affairs.
- Jean-Pierre Raffarin, former Prime Minister of France and Senator.
- Sébastien Lecornu,Prime Minister of France.
- Claude Chirac, daughter and advisor to former President of France Jacques Chirac.
- Michèle Alliot-Marie, former French Minister of Justice, Minister of the Interior, Minister of Defence and Minister of Foreign and European affairs.
- Christiane Taubira, former French Minister of Justice, former member of the French National Assembly and former member of the European Parliament.
- Martine Aubry, former first secretary of the Socialist Party of France, Mayor of Lille, former Minister of Social Affairs, and member of Parliament.
- Rachida Dati, former member of the European Parliament and French Minister of Justice.
- François Baroin, former Senator, former member of the French National Assembly, former French Minister of Finance, Minister of the Interior, and Minister for Overseas Territories.
- Jean-Marie Le Pen, former president of the National Front.
- Marine Le Pen, member of the French National Assembly and two-time presidential finalist.
- Claude Goasguen, member of the French National Assembly and former Minister.
- Bruno Gollnisch, member of the European Parliament and former member of the French National Assembly.
- Corinne Lepage, member of the European parliament, former French minister of the Environment
- Manuel Aeschlimann, member of the French National Assembly

==== Outside of France ====
Heads of State alumni

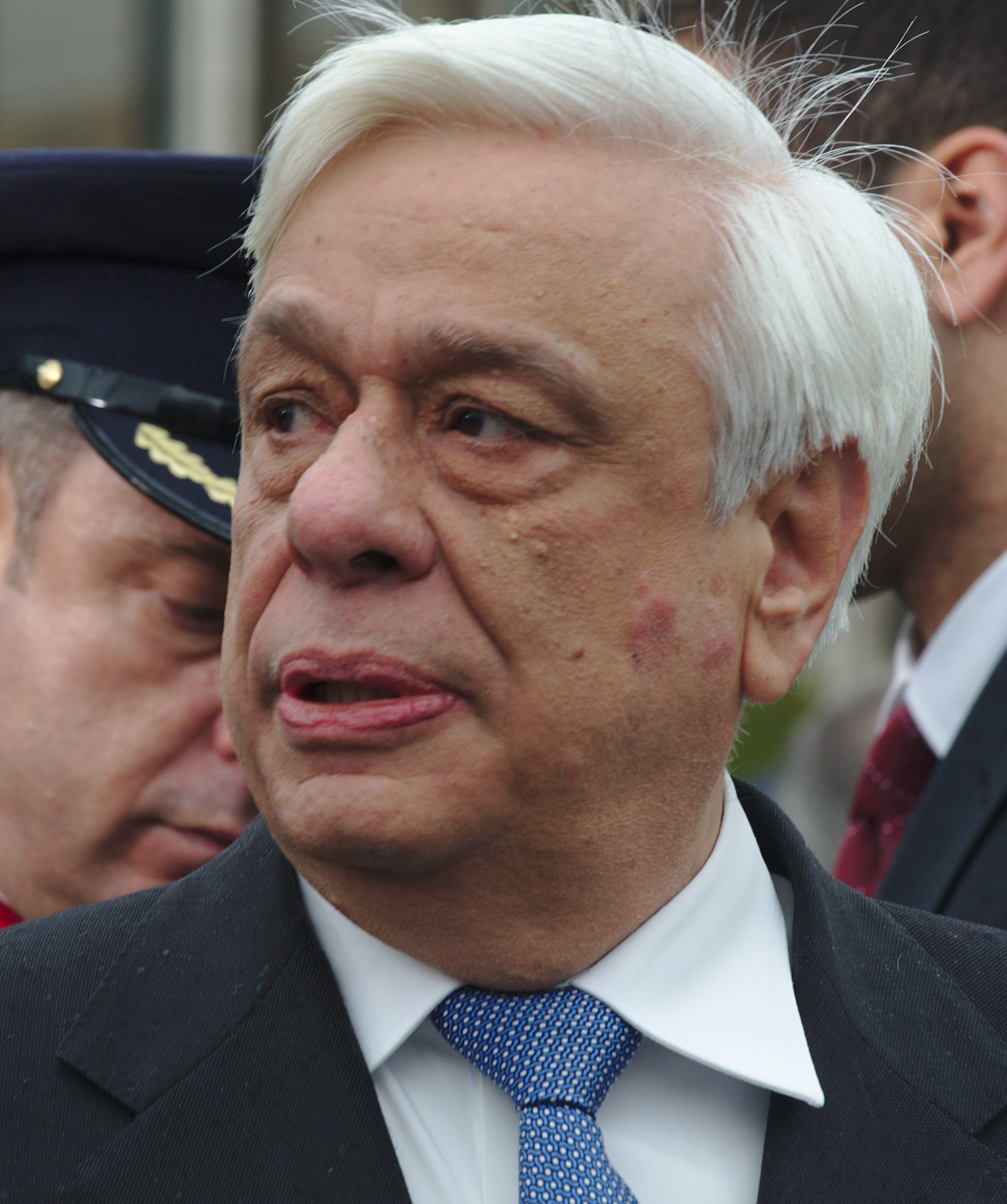
Prokopis Pavlopoulos

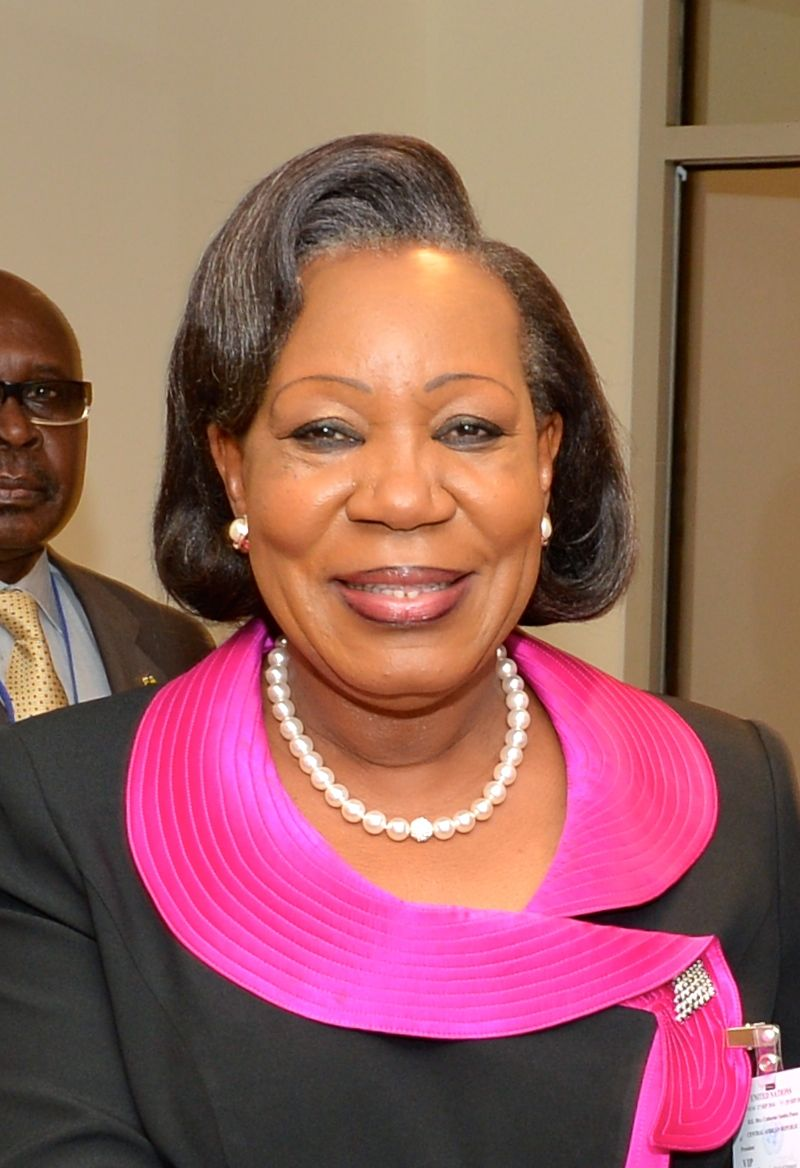
Catherine Samba-Panza

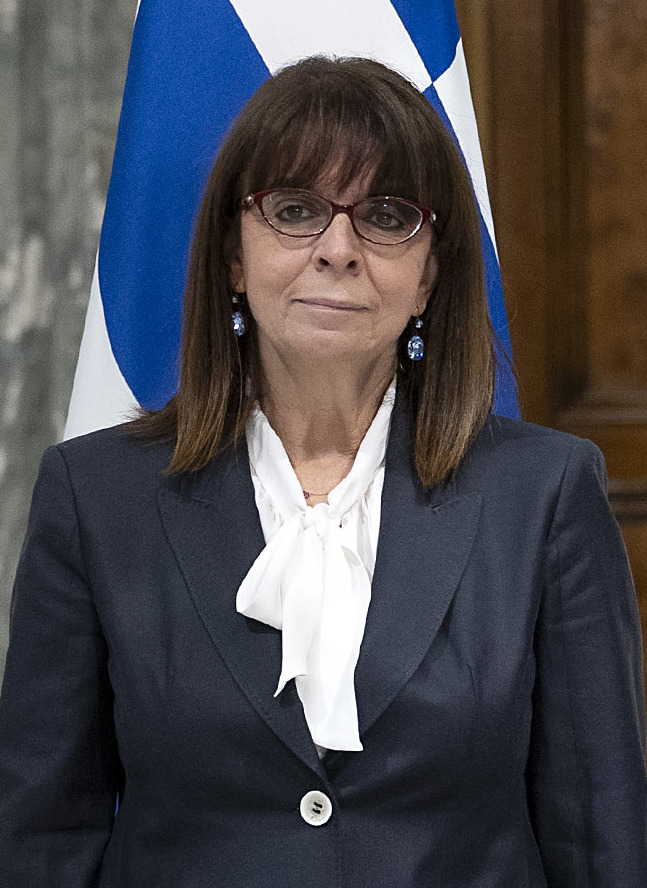
Katerina Sakellaropoulou

- Ekaterini Sakellaropoulou, President of Greece since 2020.
- Dimitris Mardas, former Deputy Minister of Foreign Affairs of Greece.
- Catherine Samba-Panza, first female president of the Central African Republic.
- Prokopis Pavlopoulos, President of Greece, former member of the Hellenic Parliament and former Greek Minister of the Interior.
- Pierre-Damien Habumuremyi, Prime Minister of Rwanda.
- Panagiotis Pikrammenos, former President of the Greek Council of State.
- Evangelos Venizelos, former Deputy Prime Minister of Greece, former Greek Minister of Finance.
- Néstor Osorio Londoño, Permanent Representative of Colombia to the United Nations, former Permanent Representative of Colombia to the International Coffee Organization and executive director of the International Coffee Organization, former and first Permanent Representative of Colombia to the World Trade Organization.
- Adán Augusto López Hernández, former governor of the Mexican State of Tabasco and secretary of the Mexican Secretariat of the Interior.

=== Judiciary and Law ===
Notable alumni lawyers and judges

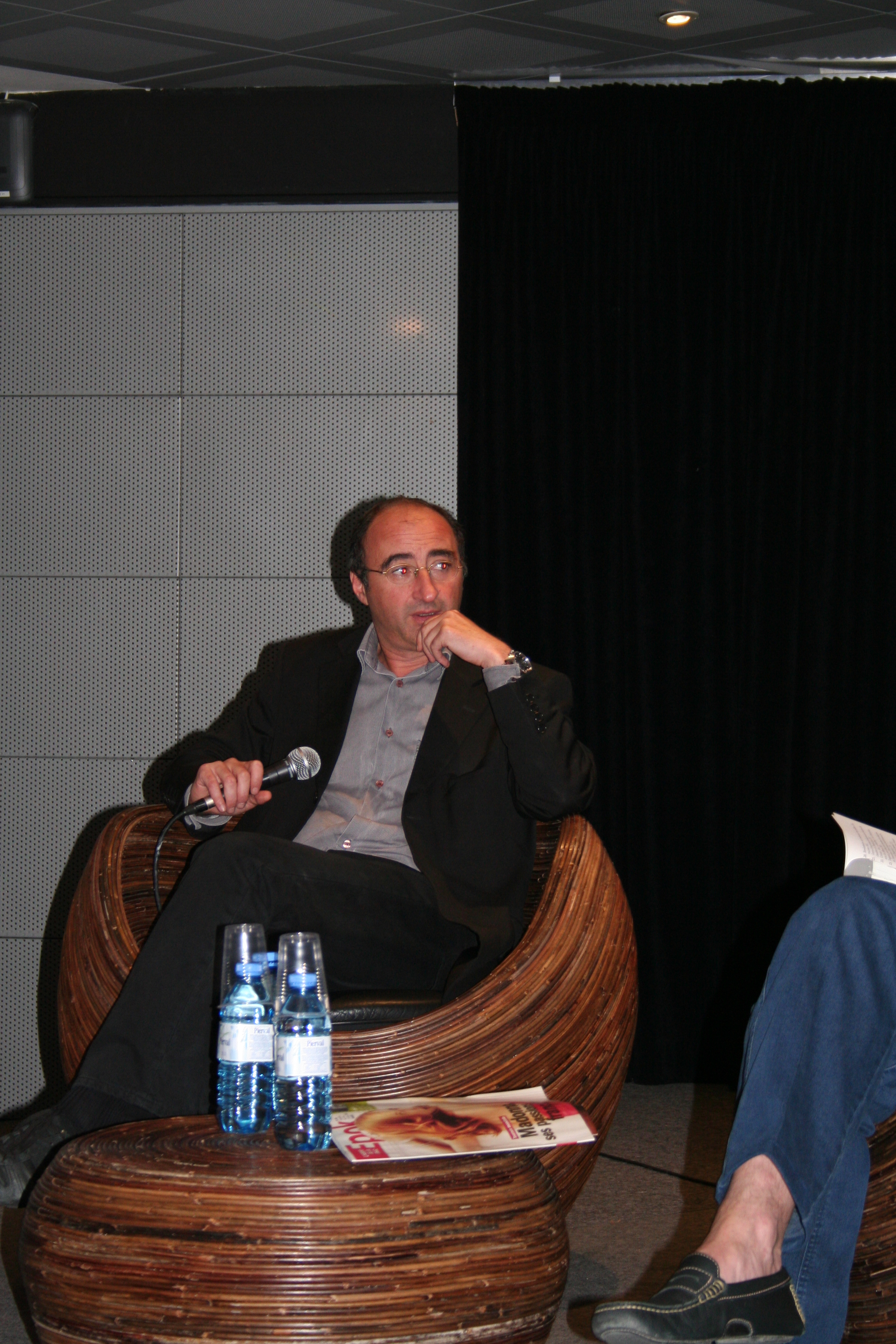
Eric Halphen

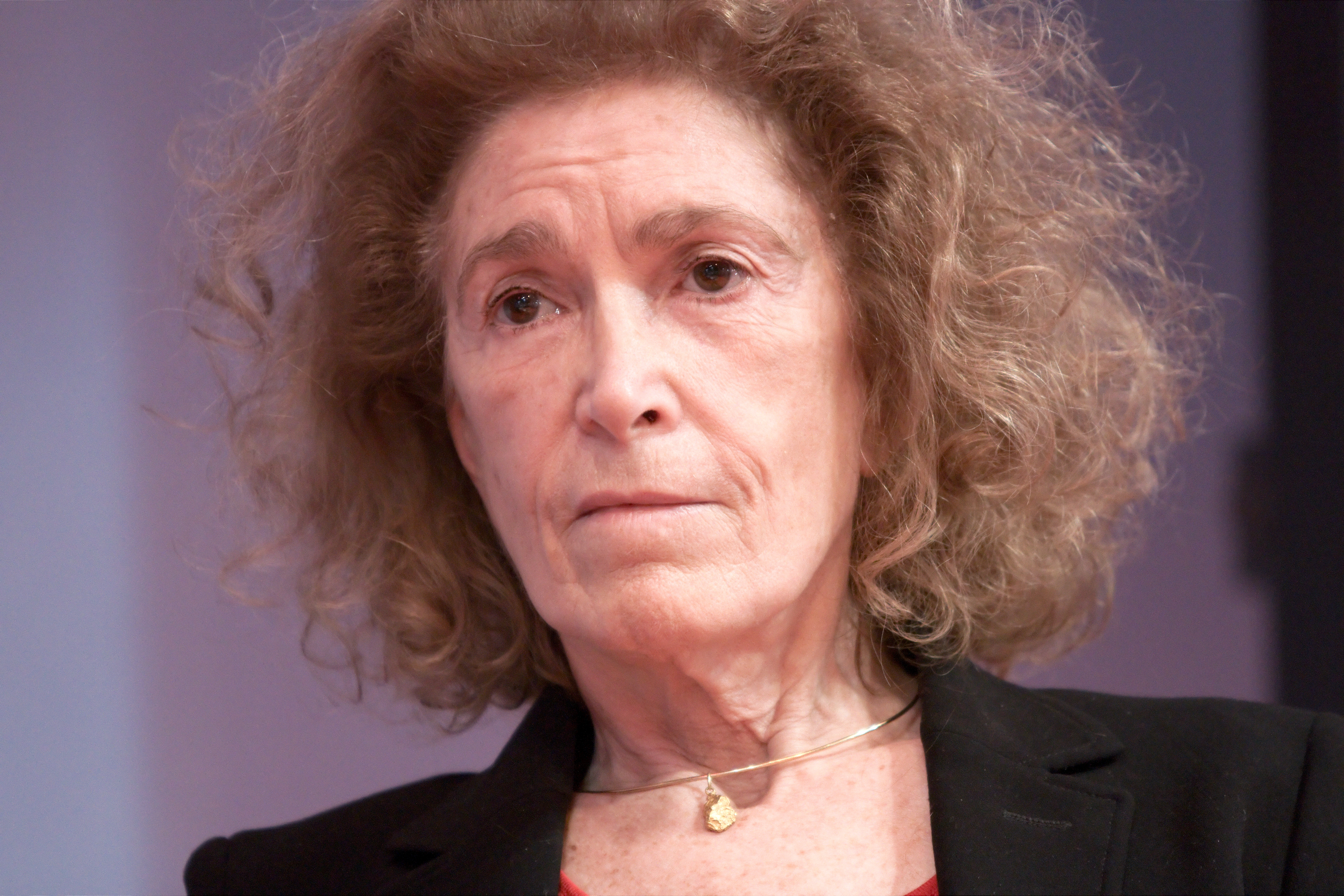
Mireille Delmas-Marty

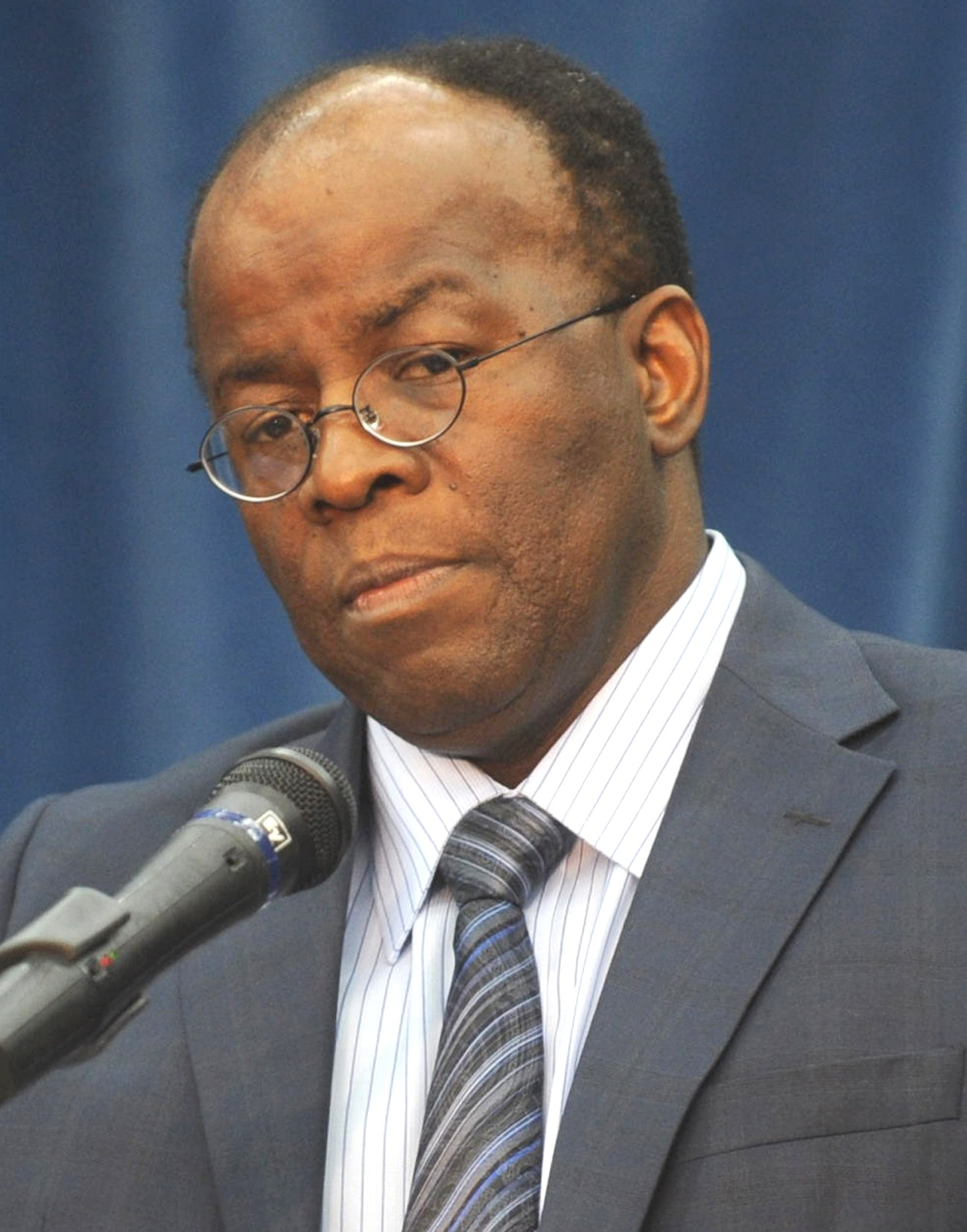
Joaquim Barbosa

Among alumni of Paris II who had significant role in the judiciary and in Law, there are:

- Joaquim Barbosa, former President of the Supreme Federal Court of Brasil.
- Yves Bot, general attorney at the Court of Justice of the European Union.
- Mireille Delmas-Marty, member of the Institut de France, professor and activist.
- Emmanuel Gaillard, chairman of the International Arbitration Institute and former professor at Harvard Law School.
- Éric Halphen, anti-corruption French judge.
- Raymond Ranjeva, vice-president of the International Court of Justice.
- Daniel Turp, professor of law and member of the National Assembly of Quebec.

=== Media ===
Media personalities alumni

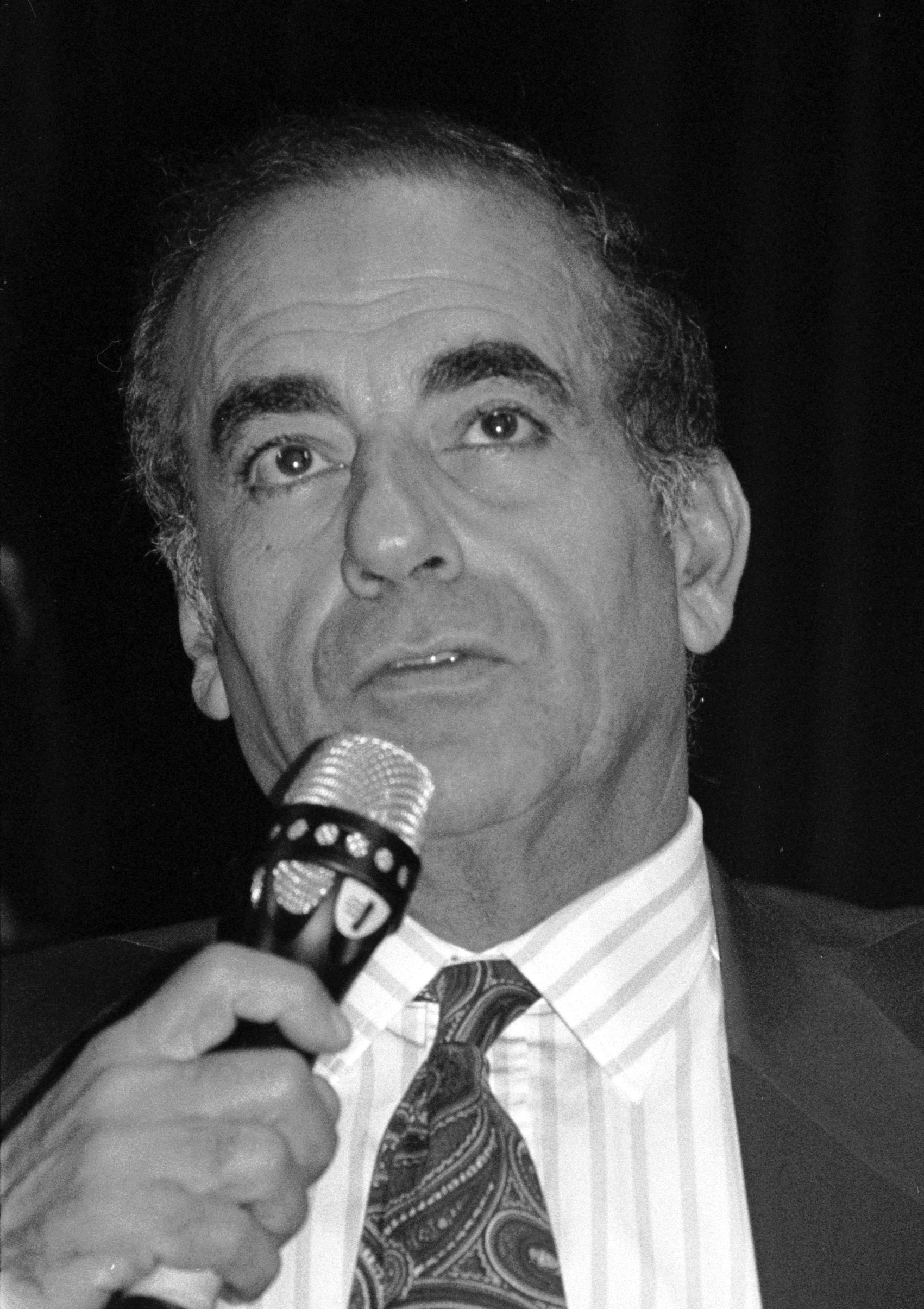
Jean-Pierre Elkabbach

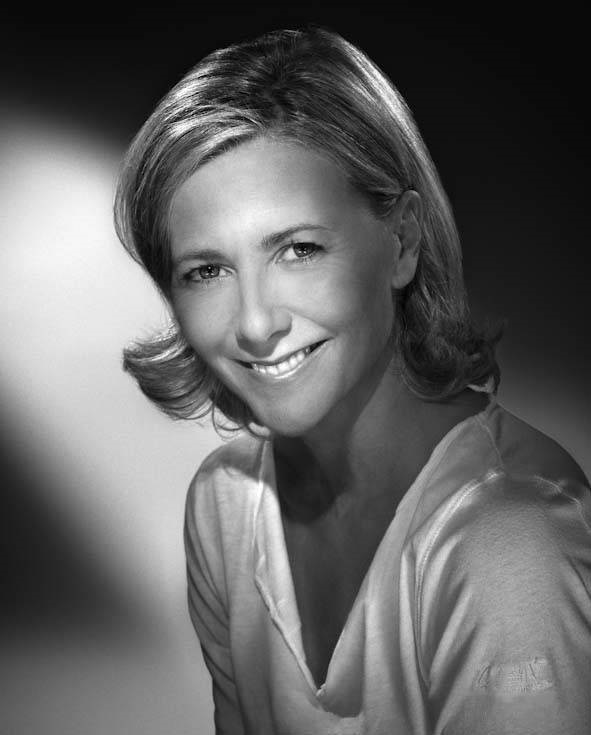
Claire Chazal

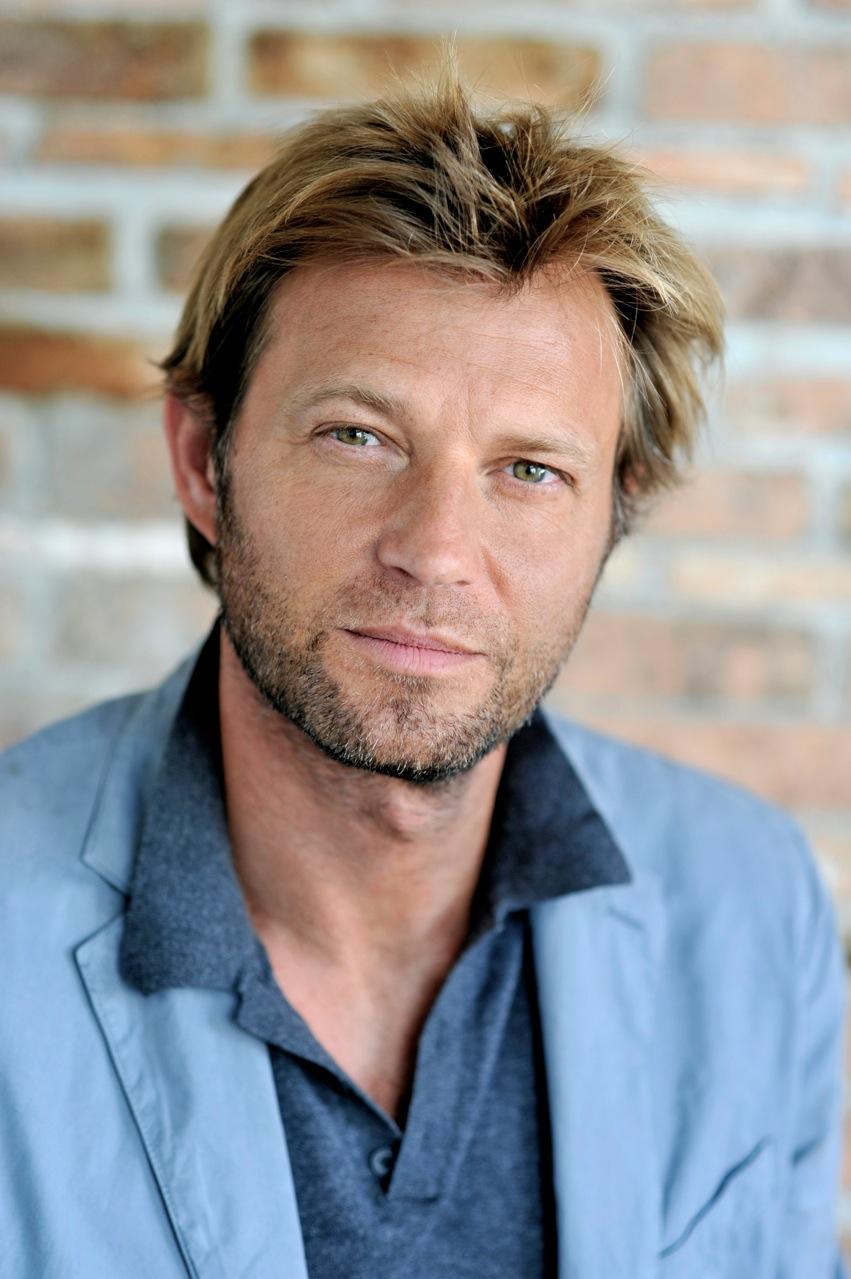
Laurent Delahousse

Among alumni of Paris-Panthéon-Assas who had significant role in the media, there are:

Journalists

- Claire Chazal, anchor at TF1.
- Laurent Delahousse, anchor at France 2.
- Jean-Pierre Elkabbach, journalist.
- Bernard Rapp, investigative journalist.
- Léa Salamé, famous radio host at France Inter and anchor at France 2.
- Marie Inbona, Television presenter for M6

Heads of media

- Marc-Olivier Fogiel, CEO of BFM TV, former TV and radio host.
- Jean-Marie Colombani, former director of Le Monde.
- Jean-Paul Cluzel, former president of Radio France.

=== Business ===
- Jean-Charles Brisard (born 1968), international consultant
- Catherine Guillouard, former president of RATP Group.
- Denis Hennequin, former president of Accor.

=== Other ===
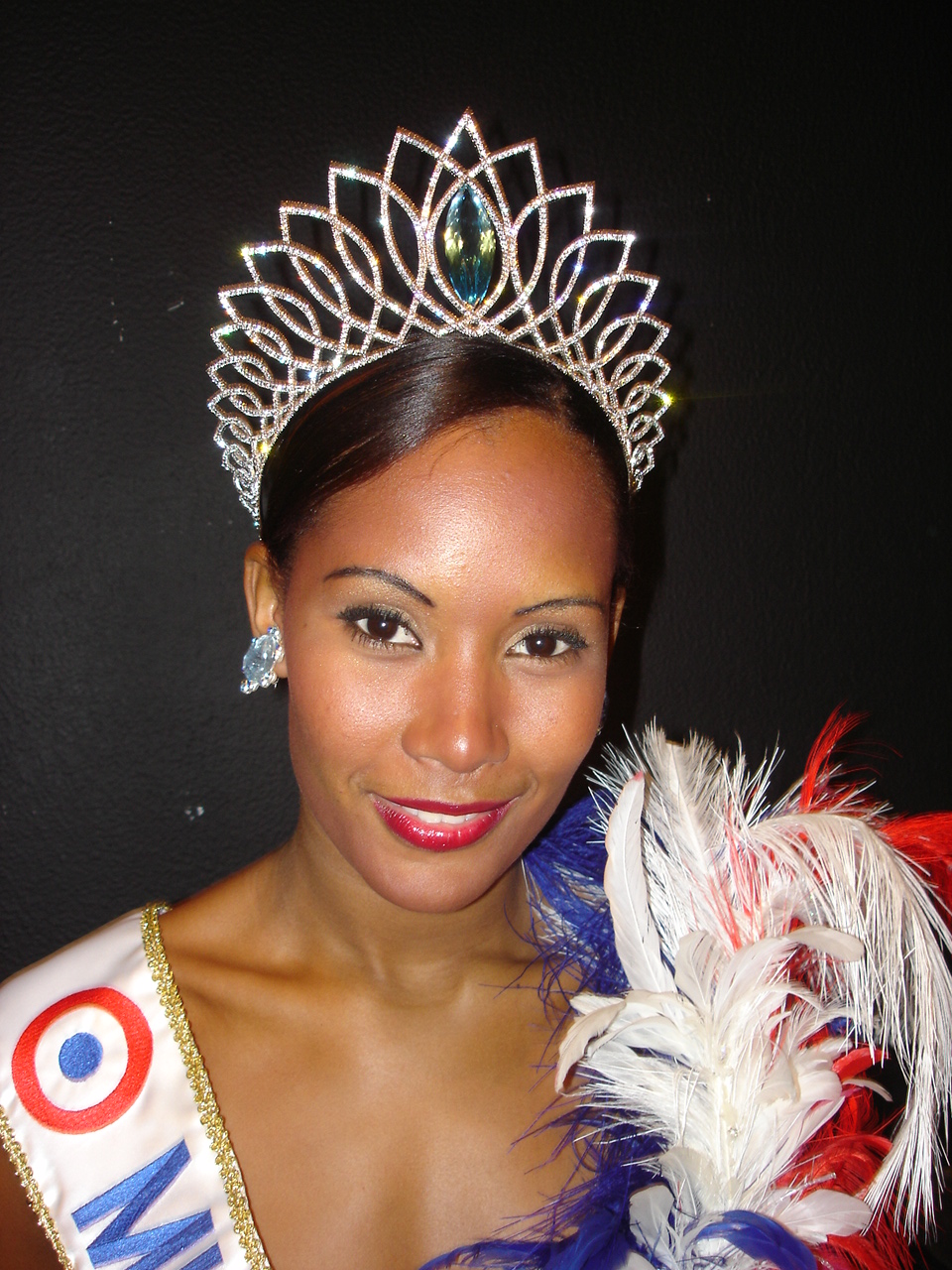
Miss France 2003

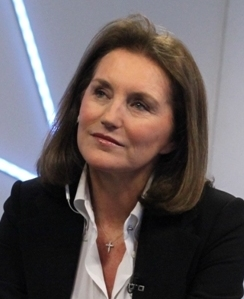
Cecilia Sarkozy

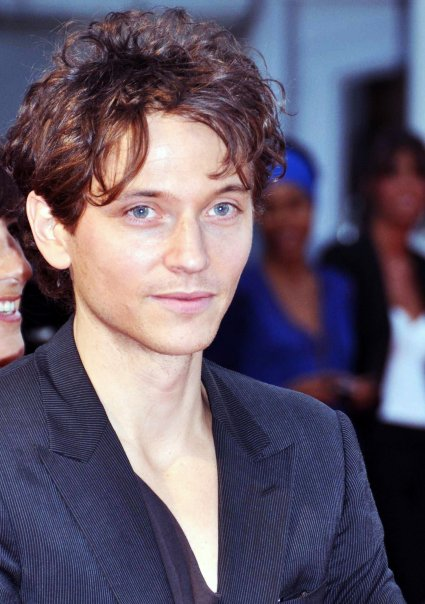
Raphaël Haroche

- Cécilia Sarkozy, former First Lady of France.
- Henri Giscard d'Estaing, son of former President of France Valéry Giscard d'Estaing.
- Floriane Chinsky, notable female rabbi.
- Raphaël Haroche (Raphael), famous singer.

== See also ==
- Higher education in France
- Law schools in France
- Paris Law Faculty

== Sources ==
- Adams, Geoffrey (2006). Political Ecumenism: Catholics, Jews and Protestants in de Gaulle's Free France, 1940–1945. McGill-Queen's University Press.
- Arrêté du 2 octobre 1990.
- Arrêté du 6 janvier 1926.
- Bellamy, Olivier (2011). Martha Argerich: die Löwin am Klavier (in German). Edition Elke Heidenreich. ISBN 978-3570580233.
- Berstein, Serge (1993). The Republic of de Gaulle, 1958–1969. Cambridge University Press. ISBN 978-0521252393.
- Bordier, Sophie (2 October 2006). "Mention bien à la fac de Melun". Le Parisien (in French).
- Bras, Jean-Yves (2006). Carlo Maria Giulini (in French). Bleu nuit. ISBN 978-2913575813.
- Chesnel, Sandrine (3 January 2008). "Choisir la meilleure fac de droit". L'Express (in French).
- Conac, Gérard (2005). "La fondation de l'université Paris I : François Luchaire, pilote d'une transition institutionnelle". In Bougrab, Jeannette; Maus, Didier (eds.). François Luchaire, un républicain au service de la République (in French). Publications de la Sorbonne. ISBN 978-2859445157.
- D'Agostino, Salvatore (1988). Università e territorio: squilibri e strategie di superamento (in Italian and French). Guida Editori.
- De Brancovan, Mihaï (January 1973). "Les concerts à Paris". Revue des deux mondes (in French).
- De Brancovan, Mihaï (April 1973). "Les concerts à Paris". Revue des deux mondes (in French).
- Décret n^{o} 70–246 du 21 mars 1970 relatif à la mise en place des universités (in French).
- Desmons, Gilles (2008). Walking Paris (4th ed.). New Holland Publishers. ISBN 978-1847730619.
- French National School for the Judiciary. Profil de la promotion 2008 (in French).
- Fourquet, Thomas (2013). Que faire avec un bac S (in French). L'Étudiant. ISBN 9782817602592.
- Genette, Gérard (2009). Codicille (in French). Seuil. ISBN 978-2021010336.
- Giles, Robert H.; Snyder, Robert W., eds. (1998). 1968: Year of Media Decision. Transaction Publishers. ISBN 978-1412815994.
- Hottin, Christian (1999). Universités et grandes écoles à Paris : les palais de la science (in French). Action artistique de la ville de Paris.
- Le Ray, Éric (2009). Marinoni: le fondateur de la presse moderne (1823–1904) (in French). Éditions L'Harmattan.
- L'Événement du jeudi. 1993.
- Loi n^{o} 68-978 du 12 novembre 1968 dite « Edgar Faure » d'orientation de l'enseignement supérieur (in French).
- Le Nouvel Observateur (in French). 1971.
- L'Express (in French). 1971–1972.
- Marshall, James D., ed. (2004). Poststructuralism, Philosophy, Pedagogy. Kluwer Academic Publishers. ISBN 978-1402026027.
- Mathieu, Lilian (2008). "Les manifestations en mai–juin 68". In Damamme, Dominique; Gobille, Boris; Matonti, Frédérique; Pudal, Bernard (eds.). Mai-juin 68 (in French). Éditions de l'Atelier. ISBN 978-2708239760.
- Mayrargues, Samuel (2012). Jean Dujardin: du café-théâtre aux oscars, l'itinéraire d'un "gars normal" (in French). Éditions Balland.
- Nadeau, Jean-Benoît; Barlow, Julie (2005). Pas si fous, ces Français ! (in French). Seuil.
- Orchestre de Paris (in French). Hachette/Van de Velde. 1987. ISBN 978-2858680214.
- Oswald, Godfrey (2008). Library world records (2nd ed.). McFarland & Company.
- Pudal, Bernard (2008). "Les événements de mai et juin 1968 : bref récit chronologique". In Damamme, Dominique; Gobille, Boris; Matonti, Frédérique; Pudal, Bernard (eds.). Mai-juin 68 (in French). Éditions de l'Atelier. ISBN 978-2708239760.
- Readings, Bill (1996). The University in Ruins. Harvard University Press. ISBN 978-0674929531.
- Rey-Lefebvre, Isabelle (13 August 2012). "Paris-II-Assas, première faculté à offrir une prépa privée à l'examen d'avocat". Le Monde (in French).
- Rotman, Patrick (2008). Mai 68 raconté à ceux qui ne l'ont pas vécu (in French). Seuil. ISBN 978-2021127089.
- Sérès, Aude (19 September 2013). "Assas lance une licence de droit en ligne". Le Figaro Étudiant (in French).
