= Sorbonne Law School =

Sorbonne Law School may refer to:

- Faculty of Law of Paris (c. 1150–1970), the historical law school or faculty of law of the University of Paris (nicknamed "Sorbonne")
- Assas Law School of the Paris-Panthéon-Assas University (1971–present), successor of the Faculty of Law of Paris, delivering law courses for the Sorbonne University as an independent university
- Panthéon-Sorbonne University School of Law (2009–present), successor of the Faculty of Law of Paris, the official name for the law school of Paris 1 Panthéon-Sorbonne University
- Faculté de droit de l’Université Sorbonne Paris Nord (2020–present), the legal department of Sorbonne Paris North University

== See also ==
- Law schools in France (disambiguation)
- Paris Law School (disambiguation)
