= Philippe Ardant =

French jurist

5th President of Panthéon-Assas University
- In office 1993–1997
- Preceded by: Georges Durry
- Succeeded by: Bernard Teyssié

Personal details
- Born: July 21, 1929 Saint-Priest-sous-Aixe, France
- Died: June 6, 2007 (aged 77) Paris, France

Philippe Ardant (July 21, 1929 – June 6, 2007) was a French jurist, former president of the Constitutional Court of the principality of Andorra, former president of the Arab World Institute and former president of Panthéon-Assas University. He had been a professor at the universities of Poitiers, Beirut and Panthéon-Assas. He had co-founded Pouvoirs, a journal of constitutional law and political science.
