= Paris Institute of Comparative Law =

- Institut de droit comparé de Paris
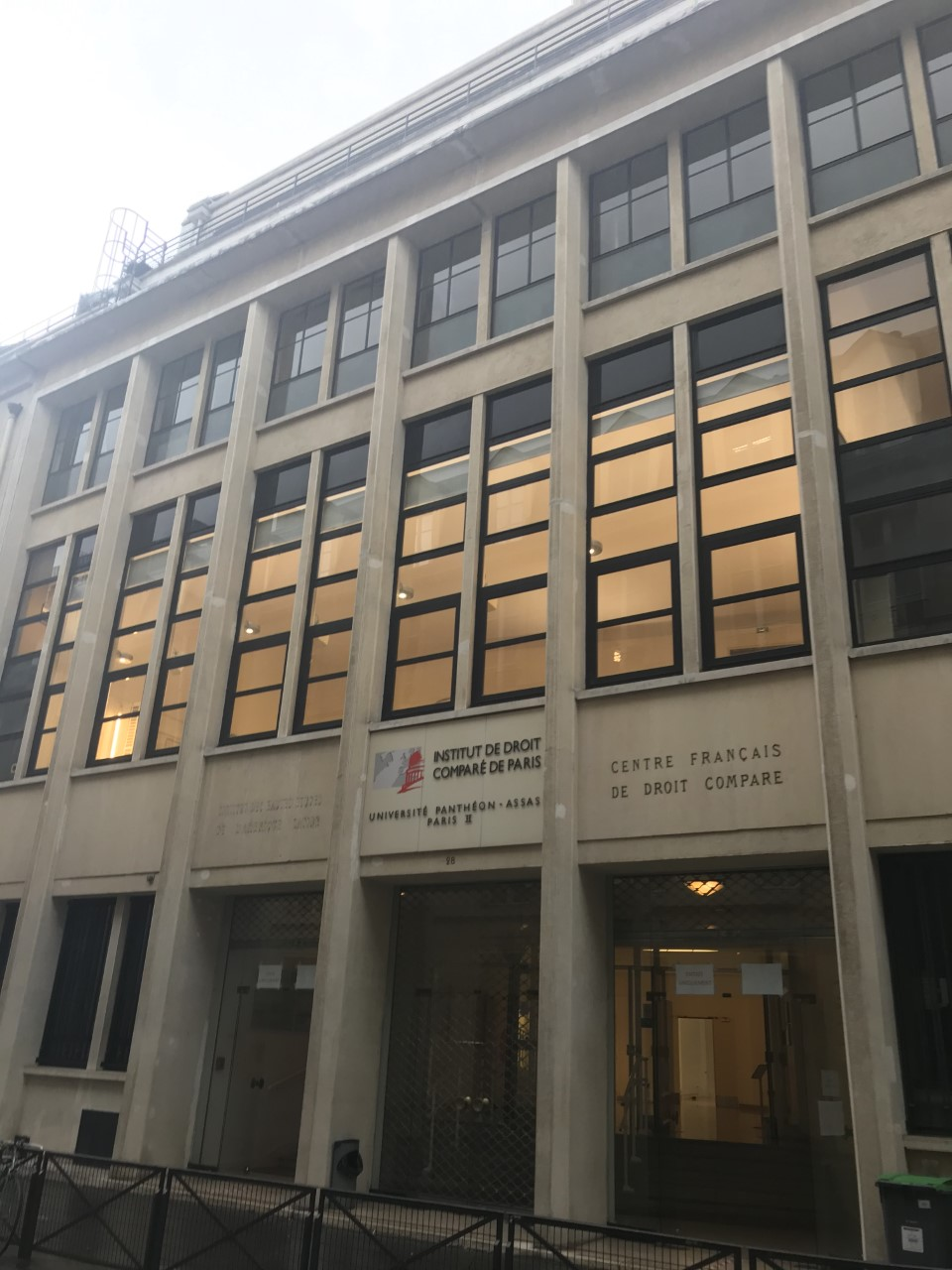
- Established: 1931
- Affiliations: Panthéon-Assas University
- Director: Louis Vogel
- Location: Paris, France
- Website: idc.u-paris2.fr

The Paris Institute of Comparative Law (French: Institut de droit comparé de Paris, commonly referred to as "IDC") is a public institution of research and higher education which was founded in 1931 by Henri Capitant and Henri Lévy-Ullmann. It is now affiliated to Paris-Panthéon-Assas University.

== Library ==
The Institute administers a library which was created in 1951 and which gathers the Institute's collections and those of the French Society of Comparative Legislation (founded in 1869) and of the French Centre of Comparative Law (founded in 1951). The library holds over fifty thousand volumes.

== Notable people ==
- Boris Mirkin-Getzevich

== Sources ==
- Bode, Michael (2010). Le groupe international de sociétés : le système de conflit de lois en droit comparé français et allemand (in French). Peter Lang. ISBN 978-3034304146.
- Church, Joan; Schulze, Christian; Strydom, Hennie (2007). Human Rights from a Comparative and International Law Perspective. Unisa Press. p. 12. ISBN 978-1868883615.
- Hodson, Harry Vincent, ed. (1986). The International Foundation Directory. Europa Publications.
- Ilbert, Courtenay (2000). The Mechanics of Law Making. The Lawbook Exchange. ISBN 978-1584770442.
- Revue internationale de droit comparé. January–March 2007.
- Winter, Jay; Prost, Antoine (2013). René Cassin and Human Rights: from the Great War to the Universal Declaration. Cambridge University Press. ISBN 978-1107032569.
