= Marie Inbona =

French television presenter (born 1980)

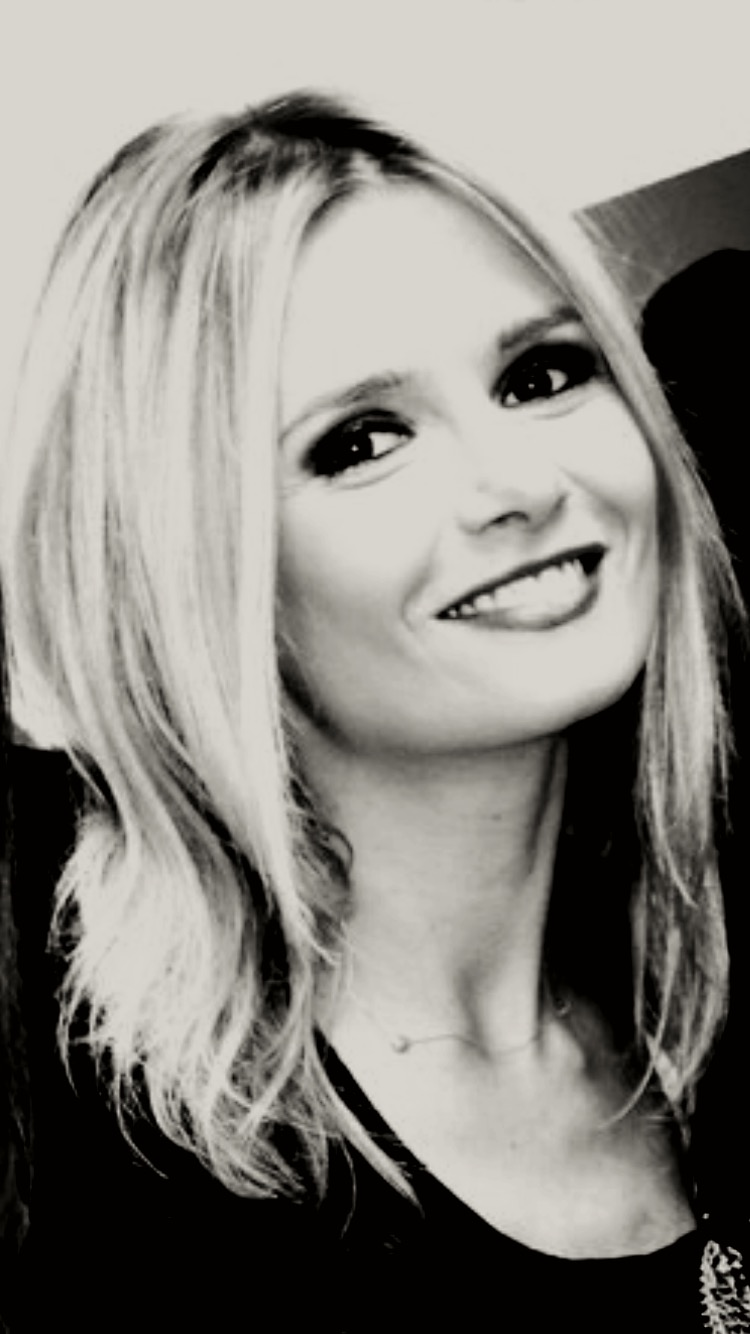
- Born: 23 May 1980 (age 44)
- Occupation: Television presenter
- Years active: 2002–present
- Notable credit(s): La vie d'aujourd'hui Paris c'est fou Vous êtes en direct
- Television: M6 (2009–12); NRJ 12 (2009–13)
- Website: www.marieinbona.com

Marie Inbona (born 23 May 1980) is a French television presenter. She became known for hosting the news on channel Infosport+ and participating at the sport program 100% Foot on channel M6.

== Education ==
Marie Inbona began her university cursus with a DEUG in law at the Panthéon-Assas University in Paris and then graduated in journalism in New York City in 2002.

== Television career ==
In August 2009, she replaced Karine Ferri during the first period of Star Six Music on M6. She also presented only once Drôle de réveil ! the same month on the same channel with Jérôme Anthony for the last broadcast of the program. She also presents in 2012 the first week of the program Absolument Stars with Alex Fighter.

Since September 2009, she presents 12 Infos on NRJ 12, replacing David Jacquot who arrived on M6 for the daily news 19:45. She also presents the news on channel NRJ Paris (a channel member of the NRJ Group) and a program about society titled La vie d'aujourd'hui on prime time on Saturday evening on NRJ 12.

Since February 2010, she is the main presenter of Paris c'est fou, a daily program broadcast on NRJ 12, where she receives personalities of the music and film industry. More than 350 episodes of the program were broadcast in the conditions of the direct. Since August 2012, she is part of the recurring journalists in the daily program of Jean-Marc Morandini Vous êtes en direct on the same channel. Since the start of the 2016 school year, she has been a columnist on the talk show Amanda with Amanda Scott on france 2.

== Personal life ==
Marie Inbona has a daughter named Romane (born 10 January 2009) and a son named Jarod (born 11 October 2013).
