= Henri Lévy-Ullmann =

French legal scholar (1870–1947)

Henri-Léon Lévy-Ullmann (1870 – 1947) was a French legal scholar who specialized in comparative law. He was Professor of Civil Law, then Professor of Comparative Law, at the University of Paris, as well as the co-founder of the Paris Institute of Comparative Law.

During the Interwar period, Lévy-Ullmann worked on the creation of a universally valid "world law of the 20th century", based on studies in comparative jurisprudence.
