= Boris Mirkin-Getzevich =

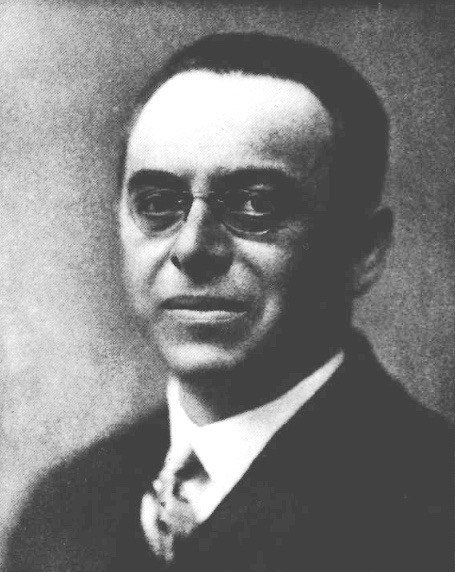
Boris Sergeyevich Mirkin-Getzevich (1892-1955)

Boris Sergeyevich Mirkin-Getzevich (Russian: Борис Серге́евич Миркин-Гецевич; January 1, 1892 – April 1, 1955), also known by his pen name, Boris Mirsky, was a Russian jurist. He had been a director of the Paris Institute of Comparative Law and a professor at the Institute of Higher International Studies, Faculty of Law of Paris.

== Life ==
Boris Mirkin-Getzevich was born in Kiev. He studied law in Saint Petersburg. In 1916, a sentence of exile to Siberia was pronounced against him because of an article he had published, but the sentence was never enforced. He emigrated to Paris after the Russian Revolution, and acquired French citizenship. He spoke Yiddish, Russian, French, German, English and Spanish. His daughter Vitia married Stéphane Hessel. He died in Paris.

== Works ==
- Les Constitutions des nations américaines, 1932.
- Droit constitutionnel international, 1933.
- Les Nouvelles tendences du droit constitutionnel, 1935.
- Le Parlamentarisme sous la Convention nationale, 1936.
- La Quatrième république, 1946.
- Les constitutions européennes, 1951–1952.
