= Henri Capitant =

French jurist (1865 - 1937)

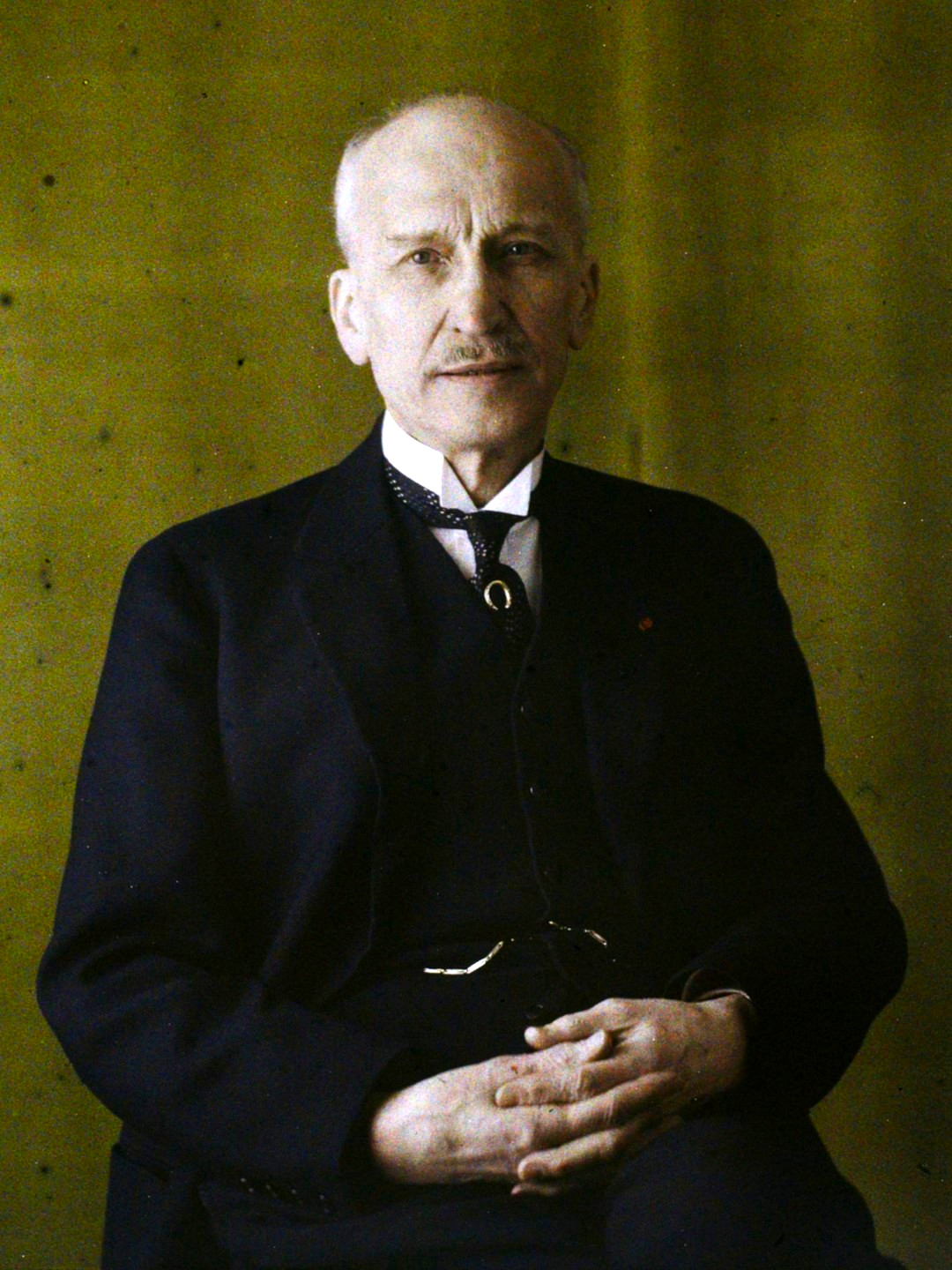
Autochrome portrait by Georges Chevalier, 1927

Henri Capitant (1865–1937) was a French jurist.

He was a professor and noted teacher of law at Grenoble (1891) and at the Faculty of Law of Paris (1908). Several of his legal textbooks have had a lasting effect on French legal education, including Introduction à l' étude du droit civil (1898), Cours élémentaire de droit civil (1914-16 with Ambroise Colin), Questions de droit civil (1933) and Grands arrêts de la jurisprudence civile (1934).

Capitant pursued an ideal of the unity of legal education, jurisprudence and legislation. A declared conservative, he objected to legal innovation, which he saw as generally threatening to a purpose of law – the preservation of individual liberty. He co-founded the Paris Institute of Comparative Law in 1931.

== Association Henri Capitant ==
Convinced that French law represented the highest degree of legal culture, Capitant founded the Association des juristes de langue française in 1935, which was renamed upon his death to Association Henri Capitant pour la Culture Juridique Française and then to Association Henri Capitant des Amis de la Culture Juridique Française.

Partially subsidised by the French government, the Association publishes studies and organises scientific conferences. It has about 45 chapters around the world, including in Louisiana and Quebec. The Association's presidents have been Henri Capitant, Jacques Charpentier, Robert Le Balle, Roger Houin, Philippe Malinvaud and Michel Grimaldi.

== Bibliography ==
- Motte, Olivier J. (2001). "Henri Capitant". In Michael Stolleis (ed.). Juristen: ein biographisches Lexikon; von der Antike bis zum 20. Jahrhundert (in German) (2nd ed.). München: Beck. p. 117. ISBN 3-406-45957-9.
