= Law schools in France =

Law schools in France may refer to three distinct institutions:

- The legal component of a French university, called Faculté de droit (Faculty of Law). For a list of these, see the List of faculties of law in France.
- A selective training of excellence, followed at the same time as the undergraduate Law degree in some universities, usually called "Collège de droit" (College of Law). See Collège de droit in France.
- A school not affiliated with a French law faculty but delivering courses in law as or inside a private or semi-private institution, with many designations, including École de droit and École en droit. Courses are not free and the diploma is rarely recognised by state.
