= Seine-et-Marne's 3rd constituency =

Constituency of the National Assembly of France

3rd constituency of Seine-et-Marne
- inline Constituency of the National Assembly of France

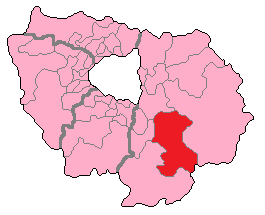
- Deputy: Jean-Louis Thiériot; LR
- Department: Seine-et-Marne
- Cantons: Châtelet-en-Brie, Montereau-Fault-Yonne, Moret-sur-Loing, Mormant
- Registered voters: 110,830

The 3rd constituency of Seine-et-Marne is a French legislative constituency in the Seine-et-Marne département.

== Description ==
The 3rd constituency of Seine-et-Marne lies in the south east of the department.

== Deputies ==
Election	Member	Party	Notes
1988	Jean-Jacques Hyest	UDF	
1993	Jean-Jacques Hyest	RPR	
1995	Pierre Carassus	MDC	By-election winner
1997	Pierre Carassus	MDC	
2002	Yves Jégo	UMP	
2007	Yves Jégo	UDI	
2008	Gérard Millet	UDI	Substitute for Yves Jégo
2009	Yves Jégo	UDI	
2012	Yves Jégo	PR-UDI	
2017	Yves Jégo	UDI	
2018	Jean-Louis Thiériot	LR	Substitute for Yves Jégo
2022	Jean-Louis Thiériot	LR	

== Election results ==
=== 2024 ===
Candidate	Party	Alliance	First round			Second round		
Candidate	Party	Alliance	Votes	%	+/–	Votes	%	+/–
Davy Brun	RN		19,153	38.13	+15.44	20,250	41.49	N/A
Jean-Louis Thiériot	LR		15,914	31.68	+7.79	28,560	58.51	+1.82
Laura Vallée-Hans	LFI	NFP	14,267	28.40	+3.13	WITHDREW		
Catherine Van Cauteren	LO		896	1.78	+0.99			
Valid votes			50,230	97.55	-0.33	48,810	95.68	+1.63
Blank votes			983	1.91	+0.19	1,825	3.58	-0.88
Null votes			279	0.54	+0.14	377	0.74	-0.75
Turnout			51,492	66.09	+19.41	51,012	65.46	+20.63
Abstentions			26,422	33.91	-19.41	26,917	34.54	-20.63
Registered voters			77,914			77,929		
Source: Ministry of the Interior, Le Monde
Result						LR HOLD		

=== 2022 ===
Legislative Election 2022: Seine-et-Marne's 3rd constituency
Party	Candidate	Votes	%	±%
LFI (NUPÉS)	Elodie Gerome-Delgado	8,895	25.27	-6.79
LR (UDC)	Jean-Louis Thiériot	8,409	23.89	-16.26
RN	Dominique Lioret	7,988	22.69	+2.27
DVC	Patrick Septiers	5,290	15.03	N/A
REC	Xavier Mallet	1,432	4.07	N/A
DVG	Olivier Theot	992	2.82	N/A
Others	N/A	2,196	6.24	
Turnout		35,202	46.68	+3.20
2nd round result
LR (UDC)	Jean-Louis Thiériot	18,422	56.69	-12.44
LFI (NUPÉS)	Elodie Gerome-Delgado	14,072	43.31	N/A
Turnout		32,494	44.83	+9.31
LR gain from UDI				

=== 2017 ===
Legislative Election 2017: Seine-et-Marne's 3rd constituency
Party	Candidate	Votes	%	±%
UDI	Yves Jégo	13,176	40.15	
FN	Aymeric Durox	6,701	20.42	
LFI	Agnès Erdemsel	4,927	15.02	
PS	Marie-Laure Fages	2,907	8.86	
EELV	Rosa Lacerda	1,956	5.96	
DLF	Stéfan Milosevic	1,075	3.28	
PCF	Virginie Masson	727	2.22	
Others	N/A	1,344		
Turnout		32,813	43.48	
2nd round result
UDI	Yves Jégo	18,531	69.13	
FN	Aymeric Durox	8,274	30.87	
Turnout		26,805	35.52	
UDI gain from PRV				

=== 2012 ===
Legislative Election 2012: Seine-et-Marne's 3rd constituency
Party	Candidate	Votes	%	±%
PRV (UDI)	Yves Jégo	15,987	37.88	
PS	Patricia Inghelbrecht	14,531	34.43	
FN	Virginie Recher	6,965	16.50	
FG	Jean-Luc Maillot	2,127	5.04	
Others	N/A	2,593		
Turnout		42,803	59.06	
2nd round result
PRV (UDI)	Yves Jégo	21,752	53.11	
PS	Patricia Inghelbrecht	19,202	46.89	
Turnout		42,227	58.26	
PRV gain from UMP				

=== 2007 ===
Legislative Election 2007: Seine-et-Marne's 3rd constituency
Party	Candidate	Votes	%	±%
UMP	Yves Jégo	22,178	49.65	
DVG	Sami Nair	5,870	13.14	
MoDem	Patrick Septiers	4,938	11.05	
DVG	Pierre Carassus	4,931	11.04	
FN	Jean-François Jalkh	2,151	4.82	
LV	Hélène Lipietz	1,824	4.08	
Far left	Annie Sicre	1,112	2.49	
Others	N/A	1,664		
Turnout		45,431	59.35	
2nd round result
UMP	Yves Jégo	26,050	63.47	
DVG	Sami Nair	14,996	36.53	
Turnout		42,832	55.95	
UMP hold				

=== 2002 ===
Legislative Election 2002: Seine-et-Marne's 3rd constituency
Party	Candidate	Votes	%	±%
UMP	Yves Jégo	16,122	36.44	
PS	Daniele Chazarenc	7,342	16.59	
DVG	Pierre Carassus	7,182	16.23	
FN	Jean-François Jalkh	6,104	13.80	
UDF	Patrick Septiers	4,321	9.77	
LCR	Jeanne Bordelet	916	2.07	
Others	N/A	2,260		
Turnout		45,014	63.35	
2nd round result
UMP	Yves Jégo	22,666	57.61	
PS	Daniele Chazarenc	16,677	42.39	
Turnout		40,957	57.64	
UMP gain from MRC				

=== 1997 ===
Legislative Election 1997: Seine-et-Marne's 3rd constituency
Party	Candidate	Votes	%	±%
RPR	Yves Jégo	13,397	30.50	
MRC	Pierre Carassus	12,021	27.37	
FN	Jean-François Jalkh	8,466	19.28	
Far right	Stéphane Mathieu	2,866	6.53	
LO	Frédéric Castello	1,521	3.46	
Far right	Dominique Bénéteau	1,488	3.39	
DVE	Hélène Lienhardt	1,358	3.09	
GE	Marie-Claude de Marcos	1,321	3.01	
DVD	Denis Jullemier	1,139	2.59	
DVD	Philippe Lassiaz-Delaunes	344	0.78	
Far right	Emmanuelle Flachot	0	0.00	
Turnout		45,860	65.57	
2nd round result
MRC	Pierre Carassus	23,141	50.52	
RPR	Yves Jégo	22,667	49.48	
Turnout		48,579	69.45	
MRC hold				

== Sources ==
- "Résultats électoraux officiels en France" (in French). 2012.
- "Résultats électoraux officiels en France" (in French). 2007.
- "Résultats électoraux officiels en France" (in French). 2002.
