= Yves Jégo =

French politician (born 1961)

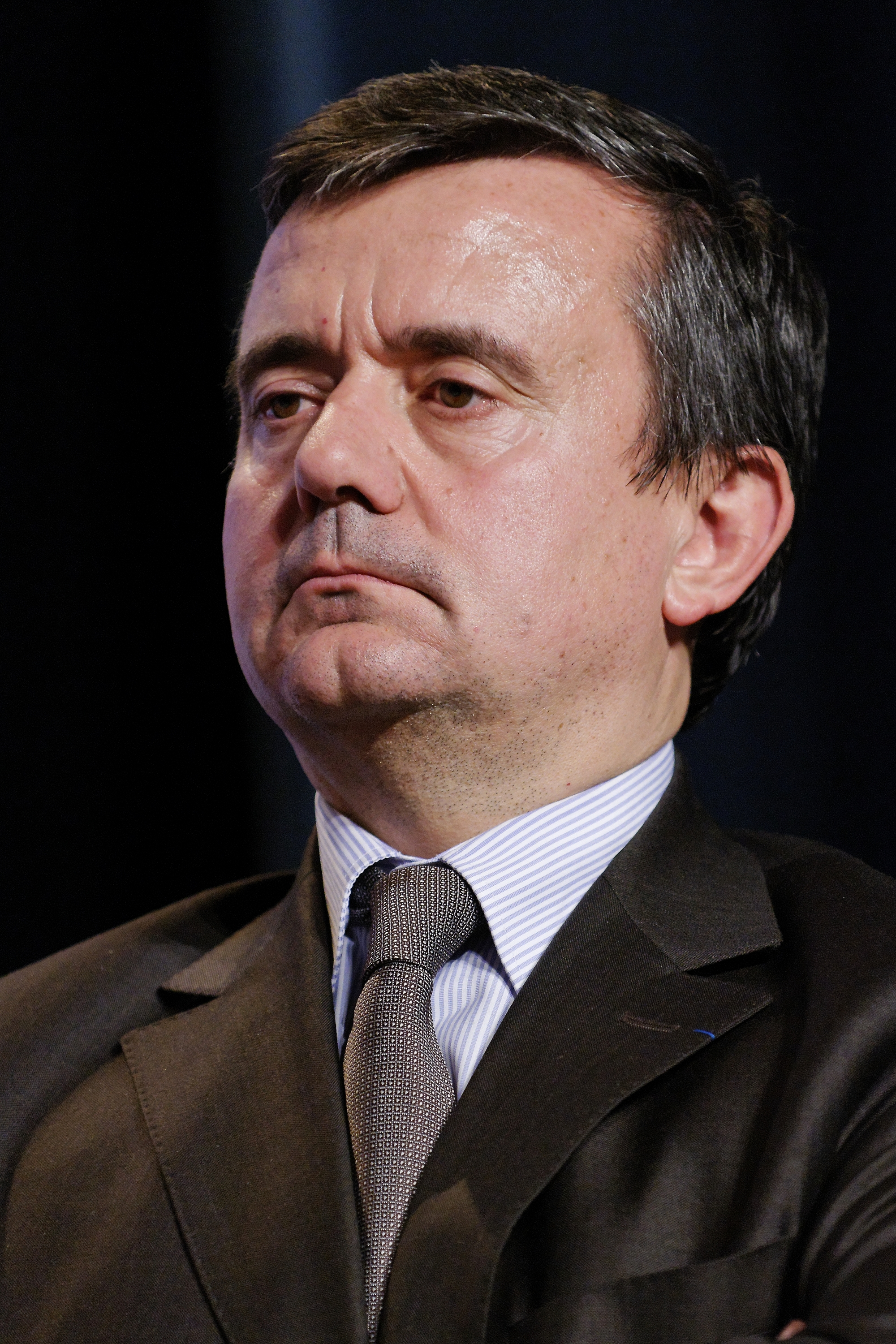
- Yves Jégo in 2010

Member of the National Assembly for Seine-et-Marne's 3rd constituency
- In office 24 July 2019 – 15 July 2018
- Preceded by: Gérard Millet
- Succeeded by: Jean-Louis Thiériot
- In office 19 June 2002 – 19 April 2008
- Preceded by: Pierre Carassus
- Succeeded by: Gérard Millet

Mayor of Montereau-Fault-Yonne
- In office 19 June 1995 – 1 July 2017
- Preceded by: Alain Drèze
- Succeeded by: James Chéron

Secretary of state for Overseas
- In office 18 March 2008 – 23 June 2009
- President: Nicolas Sarkozy
- Prime Minister: François Fillon
- Preceded by: Christian Estrosi
- Succeeded by: Marie-Luce Penchard

Personal details
- Born: 17 April 1961 (age 65) Besançon, France
- Party: UDI
- Education: University of Franche-Comté; Panthéon-Assas University

Yves Jégo (French: [iv ʒeɡo]; born 17 April 1961) is a French former politician. He served as a member of the National Assembly for the third constituency of Seine-et-Marne from 2002 to 2018, as Mayor of Montereau-Fault-Yonne from 1995 to 2017, and as president of the Communauté de communes des Deux Fleuves.

He was the general delegate of the Union of Democrats and Independents, from the party's creation in October 2012. He was also vice president of the Radical Party. Jégo was the spokesman for the Union for a Popular Movement, when that party was ruling. He is also founder and president of a local party Mieux Vivre Ensemble (MVE), formerly known as Mouvement des Seine-et-Marnais (MdSM).

Jégo was appointed Secretary of State for Overseas in the government of François Fillon on 18 March 2008. He was therefore the Minister in charge of French Oversea territories during the 2009 French Caribbean protests and general strikes against high living costs and particularly the costs of food and fuel. As he undertook the dismantling of monopolies, his role was the subject of controversy. He was replaced by Marie-Luce Penchard on 23 June 2009 and was not given another portfolio.

He announced in June 2018 that he would retire from politics and as a deputy in mid-July 2018. As of early 2023, he is the executive director (Délégué Général) of the Avec financial group, which is under investigation for alleged illegal asset stripping.

== Political career ==
Governmental functions

Secretary of State for Overseas: 2008–2009.

Electoral mandates

While most members of the French parliament are also mayors or general (department) or regional councillor, Jégo is one of the few to cumulate three elected offices.

1. National Assembly of France

- Member of the National Assembly of France for Seine-et-Marne (3rd constituency): 2002-2008 (Became secretary of State in 2008) / Again from 2009 to 2018. Elected in 2002, reelected in 2007 and 2012.

2. Municipal Council

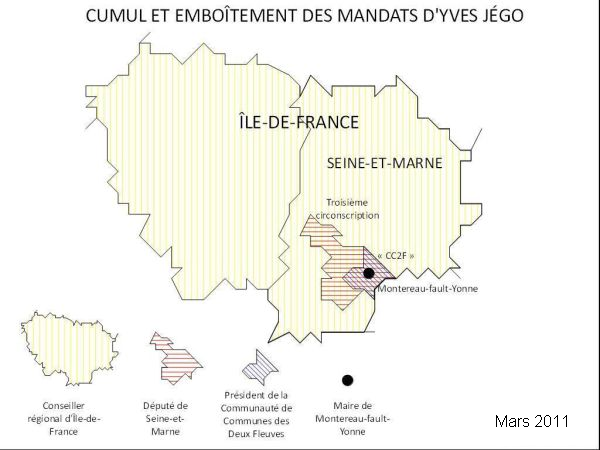
Jégo's four electoral mandates, between March 2010 and July 2011

- Municipal councillor of Montereau-Fault-Yonne: Since 1989. Reelected in 1995, 2001, 2008.
- Mayor of Montereau-Fault-Yonne: Since 1995. Reelected in 2001, 2008.

3. Community of communes Council

- President of the Communauté de communes des Deux Fleuves: Since 2003. Reelected in 2008.

Regional Council

- Jégo has also been Regional councillor of Île-de-France: from March 2010 to his resignation in July 2011.

Accumulation of electoral mandates

According to French law against accumulation of electoral mandates, Jégo should have resigned from one of the three first mandates in this list before 21 April 2010. But giving as a pretext a legal complaint from the Front National's candidates, he still held the three of them, plus his local mandate of president of the « communauté de communes des deux fleuves » (CC2F) until his resignation from the Regional Council in July 2011.

In September 2011, Yves Jégo failed to become a member of the Senate of France. In June 2012, he was re elected as a member of the National Assembly.

== Voluntary associations ==
Yves Jégo is involved in a number of voluntary associations.

- Co-founder and president of the multi-partisan association Entreprendre Villes et quartiers, devoted to the promotion of the French Zones Franches Urbaines (Urban Free Trade Zones) since 1996.
- Founder and president since 2001 of the association la Seine en partage, devoted to the economical and cultural promotion of the Seine river.
- Founder and president since 2006 of the Association Française d’Accession Populaire à la Propriété (AFAP)—formerly and briefly named Association des maisons à 100.000 euros. Its purpose is to help municipalities to build €100,000 houses and to sell them to lower-class households.

== Professional experience ==
- Development director of human resources management and recruitment firm, Light Consultant (1998–2002)
- Co-founder of a publishing house, Éditions Timée (2000)
- Co-founder of a publishing house, Squan Éditions (2008)
- Lawyer (2010)
- Executive director (Délégué Général) of the Avec financial group, which is under investigation for alleged illegal asset stripping.

== Recognition ==
On 6 November 2007, Jégo was among the guests invited to the state dinner hosted by U.S. President George W. Bush in honor of President Nicolas Sarkozy at the White House.

== Legal issues ==
An active blogger himself, Jégo sued two blogs for defamation and insult. In 2007, he sued Frédéric Maupin and Jean-Luc Pujo for calling him a "liar" and "manipulator" during the 2007 legislative campaign. His suit was dismissed in November 2007, and his subsequent appeal in July 2009 by the Paris appeal court. In 2008, he similarly sued a local opponent, Yves Poey, for calling him an "apparatchik" and a "schemer" during the local elections campaign. Jégo won ) in March 2008 for "schemer", but Poey later won his appeal in May 2010.
