= Markbygden Wind Farm =

Interconnected wind farms west of Piteå, Sweden

- Location of the Markbygden Wind Farm
- Country: Sweden
- Location: Piteå, Norrbotten County
- Coordinates: 65°25′N 20°40′E
- Status: Operational
- Construction began: 2008
- Commission date: December 2010–
- Construction cost: € 5.1 billion
- Owner: Several
- Operator: Several

Wind farm
- Type: Onshore
- Hub height: 108–138 m (354–453 ft)
- Rotor diameter: 82–158 m (269–518 ft)

Power generation
- Make and model: Enercon E-82 EP2 (12), Enercon E-92 EP2 (36), Enercon E-103 EP2 (26), Enercon E-126 EP3 (10), Enercon E-138 EP3 (95), General Electric 3.6-137 (179), General Electric 5.5-158 (137)
- Nameplate capacity: 2007.4 MW (as of 2022) (up to 4,000 MW)

External links
- Website: markbygden1101.com

The Markbygden Wind Farm is a series of interconnected wind farms in the Markbygden area west of Piteå, Norrbotten County in northern Sweden. The project is expected to be completed by 2025 and could have a total capacity of up to 4,000 megawatts (MW), comprising up to 1,101 wind turbines. The project was initially co-developed by Svevind AB and wind turbine manufacturer Enercon.

Combined the Markbygden Wind Farm is the biggest wind farm in Europe and was on track to be one of the biggest onshore windfarms in the world.

After performing below expectations and due to an expensive long-term contract with Norwegian industrial group Hydro, the company had to file for reconstruction of the company, which is a process to avoid bankruptcy. The current status of the project and the company is unknown. As of March 2025, the website is not reachable.

== Layout ==
The project is divided into three larger phases plus two pilot projects, subdivided as follows:

Name	Phase	Number of turbines	Turbine models	Power (MW)	Commissioned
Dragaliden	Pilot	12	Enercon E-82 EP2	24	2010
Storblåliden	Pilot	3	General Electric 3.6-137 / 5.5-158	12.7	2018–2020
Skogberget	1	36	Enercon E-92 EP2	84.6	2014
Ersträsk South	1	36	Enercon E-103 EP2 / E-126 EP3	101.1	2018–2020
Ersträsk North	1	32	Enercon E-138 EP3	134.4	2023
MBETT	1	179	General Electric 3.6-137	644.4	2018–2019
MB 2 North	2	63	Enercon E-138 EP3	252.7	2021
Önusberget	3	137	General Electric 5.5-158	753.5	2023
Total number of turbines		498	Total nameplate capacity (MW)	2007.4	

== History ==
The original plan was forged amongst Svevind and Enercon. If fully constructed, the 55 billion kronor (€5.1 billion, US$6.9 billion) project would be the largest onshore wind farm in Europe and one of the biggest in the world. The wind farm will cover some 450 square kilometres (170 sq mi), comprising up to 1,101 wind turbines and is expected to produce up to 12 TWh/year of electricity. The project received the approval by the Norrbotten County authorities in April 2009. On 4 March 2010, the Swedish government decided to permit Markbygden Vind AB to build and run up to 1,101 wind turbines with a maximum height of 200 metres (660 ft) in the Markbygden area of Piteå Municipality.

Status as of October 2021

=== Phase 1 ===
Phase 1 consists of three wind farms or projects; the 101.1 MW Ersträsk, 644.4 MW Markbygden ETT, and 84.6 MW Skogberget. Markbygden ETT was sold by Svevind to others. Ersträsk is developed by wind turbine manufacturer Enercon.

The first wind farm in Markbygden's phase 1 project was commissioned in 2014 and consists of 36 turbines, Enercon E-92, with a hub height of 138 m (453 ft). From December 2015, Svevind and Enercon set up a new structure. With that Enercon was taking over Svevind's shares of the operational Skogberget and Ersträsk wind farms.

Markbygden ETT ("ETT" means "one" in Swedish) with its 179 wind turbines is one of the largest single onshore wind farms in Europe.

All power generated by the entire Markbygden phase 1 wind farms is transferred via the Råbäcken transformer station to the Swedish 400kV national grid.

=== Phase 2 ===
Markbygden phase 2 is the westernmost part of the wind power project in Markbygden with an area that covers about 160 km^{2} (62 sq mi). On 10 December 2015, the Environmental Court ruled on the second phase of the Markbygden project. The decision subsequently gained legal force. This second phase will be connected to a new 400kV transformer station called Trolltjärn. The Markbygden phase 2 project is developed by Enercon since December 2015. The installed capacity may be as large as 844 MW. As of October 2021, 63 Enercon E-138 turbines with a total installed power of 252.7 MW are operational.

Credit Suisse acquired 85% of the 63-turbine northern project in 2020.

Plans for about 100 more turbines still exist.

=== Phase 3 ===
Markbygden phase 3 is the third, last and potentially the largest part of the overall wind power project in Markbygden. It is located between the villages of Koler and Långträsk in the western part of the project and Blåsmark to the east, entirely within Piteå municipality. The area of Markbygden phase 3 is approximately 33.5 km (20.8 mi) long and 2.5–6 km (1.6–3.7 mi) wide. The area is about 150 km^{2} (58 sq mi) in total. The wind farm of Markbygden phase 3 will consist of up to 442 wind turbines. The permit was granted on 17 March 2016. The decision of the Environmental impact assessment committee was appealed, after which the Land and Environmental Court announced a decision on the case on 16 June 2017. The decision of the Land and Environmental Court has thereafter been appealed to the Land and Environmental Superior Court, which approved it in 2018. The Markbygden phase 3 wind farms are planned to be connected to the existing 400k V transformer station Råbäcken as well the transformer station Trolltjärn. The Önusberget 750 MW share of phase three was acquired by German asset manager Luxcara in April 2019 , powered by 137 GE Cypress 5.5MW turbines for 25 years.

== See also ==
- Wind power in Sweden
- Renewable energy in Sweden
