= Christian Jacob (politician) =

French politician

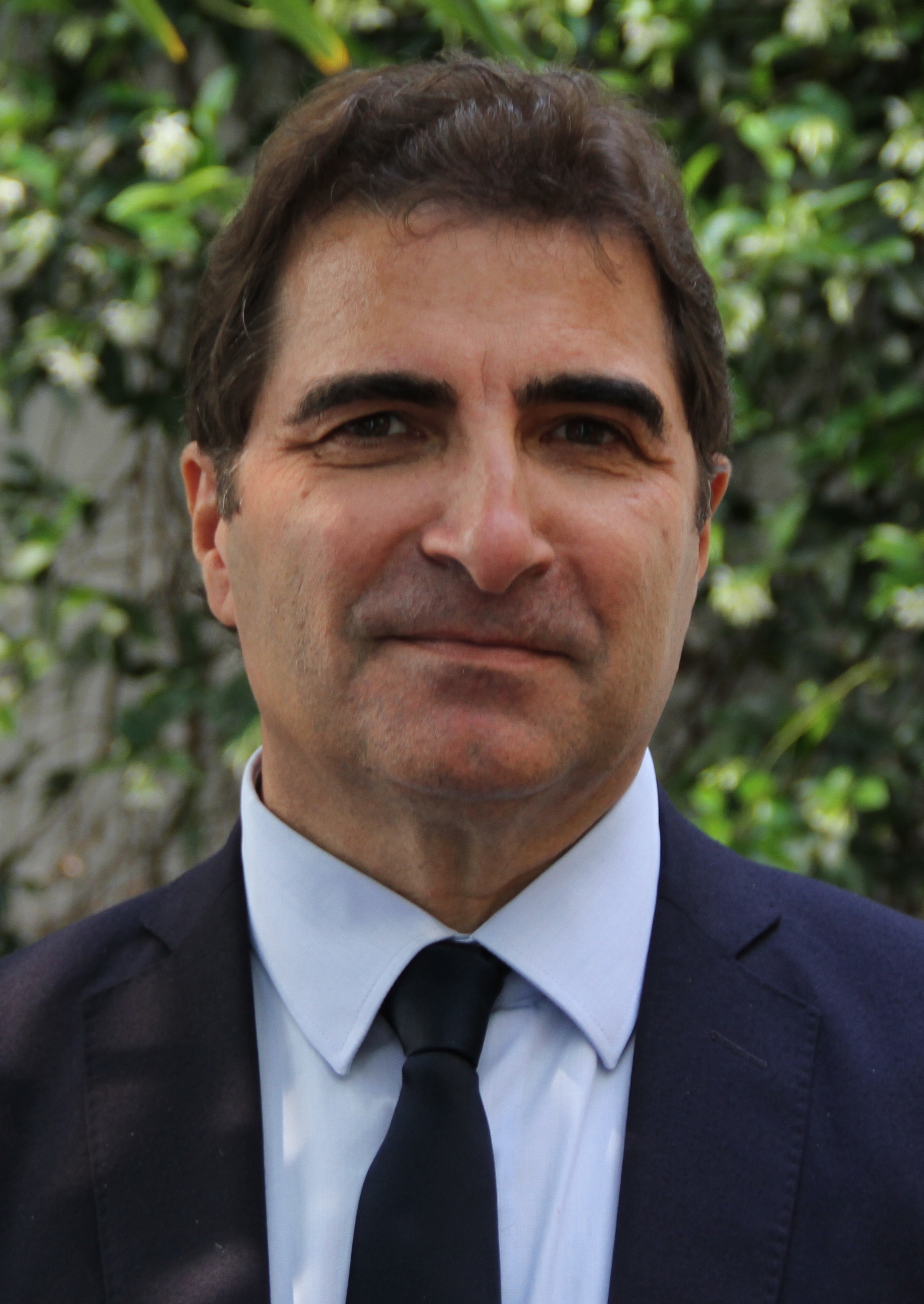
- Jacob in 2020

President of The Republicans
- In office 13 October 2019 – 30 June 2022
- Preceded by: Jean Leonetti
- Succeeded by: Eric Ciotti

Member of the National Assembly for Seine-et-Marne's 4th constituency
- In office 21 June 2007 – 21 June 2022
- Preceded by: Ghislain Bray
- Succeeded by: Isabelle Périgault

Leader of The Republicans in the National Assembly
- In office 23 November 2010 – 6 November 2019
- Preceded by: Jean-François Copé
- Succeeded by: Damien Abad

Minister of the Civil Service
- In office 2 June 2005 – 15 May 2007
- President: Jacques Chirac
- Prime Minister: Dominique de Villepin
- Preceded by: Renaud Dutreil
- Succeeded by: André Santini

Minister of the Family
- In office 17 June 2002 – 31 March 2004
- President: Jacques Chirac
- Prime Minister: Jean-Pierre Raffarin
- Preceded by: Jean-François Mattei
- Succeeded by: Marie-Josée Roig

Personal details
- Born: 4 December 1959 (age 66) Rozay-en-Brie, France
- Party: The Republicans (2015–present)
- Other political affiliations: Rally for the Republic (1995-2002); Union for a Popular Movement (2002–2015)

Christian Jacob (born 4 December 1959) is a French politician who was the president of the Republicans party from 2019 to 2022. Over the course of his career, he held several cabinet positions, including as the Minister of French Civil Service in Jacques Chirac's second term as President of France.

He served as the Member of the National Assembly for Seine-et-Marne's 4th constituency between 1995 and 2002, and then again between 2007 and 2022. He chose to not seek re-election in the 2022 French legislative election.

== Early career ==
A farmer, Jacob served in positions of responsibility in farm trade unions, local, départemental, regional then national. He was the President of the CNJA (Centre National des Jeunes Agriculteurs) from 1992 to 1994.

== Political career ==
=== Member of the European Parliament, 1994–1997 ===
Jacob became a Member of the European Parliament in the 1994 elections. In parliament, he served on the Committee on Agriculture and Rural Development. In addition to his committee assignments, he was part of the parliament's delegation for relations with Ukraine, Belarus and Moldova.

=== Career in government, 2002–2007 ===
Following the 2002 elections, Jacob was appointed to the government of Prime Minister Jean-Pierre Raffarin. He first served as Minister Delegate in charge of the Family from 2002 until 2004. In 2004, he became Minister Delegate in charge of SMEs, Trade, Crafts, Liberal Professions and Consumer Affairs, which later became a fully-fledged ministry. In 2005, in the government of Prime Minister Dominique de Villepin, he was appointed Minister for the Civil Service.

=== Member of the National Assembly, 2007–present ===
In parliament, Jacob served on the Committee on Economic Affairs (2007–2009); the Committee on Sustainable Development and Spatial Planning (2009–2010, 2012–2017); and the Committee on Defence (2010–2012).

When Jean-François Copé resigned from his position as chairman of the UMP group in the National Assembly to become the party's secretary general in late 2010, Jacob succeeded him after defeating Jean Leonetti.

In 2011 Jacob caused controversy when he described Dominique Strauss-Kahn as an urban intellectual – a "bobo," short for "bourgeois-bohemian" – and said that Strauss-Kahn did not represent "the image of France, the image of rural France, the image of the France of terroirs and territories". Both French and foreign media interpreted this notion of rootless cosmopolitanism, of being out of touch with the soil and the mystery of "la France profonde," as an old trope for foreign and Jewish influence. In response, the president of the Representative Council of Jewish Institutions of France (CRIF), Richard Prasquier, called Jacob's comments "a very great clumsiness".

In 2012, Jacob was re-elected in the first round with 117 votes, ahead of Xavier Bertrand (63 votes) and Hervé Gaymard (17 votes). In the UMP's 2012 leadership primaries, he endorsed Copé.

Under Jacob's leadership, the UMP (and later LR) parliamentary group asked for several votes of no-confidence in the government of Prime Minister Manuel Valls in 2014, 2015 and 2016.

In the Republicans' 2016 presidential primaries, Jacob endorsed Nicolas Sarkozy as the party's candidate for the office of President of France; the party's majority, however, voted for François Fillon to run in the 2017 presidential election. In March 2017, when the Fillon affair led several staff members to leave the presidential candidate's campaign team, Jacob was appointed campaign coordinator, in tandem with Bruno Retailleau.

Following the legislative elections in June 2017, Jacob was re-elected chairman of the LR parliamentary group, in a vote against Damien Abad. In addition, he has since been serving on the Defence Committee and the Committee on Sustainable Development and Spatial Planning again.

In the Republicans' 2017 leadership election, Jacob endorsed Laurent Wauquiez.

Under Jacob's leadership, the Republicans' parliamentary group asked for a vote of no-confidence in the government of Prime Minister Édouard Philippe over the Benalla affair in 2018.

In October 2019, after Wauquiez's resignation and in the context of a series of electoral losses, Jacob emerged as a consensus candidate for the LR leadership. In an internal party vote, he won against Julien Aubert and Guillaume Larrivé. Damien Abad succeeded him as leader of the LR parliamentary group. Under Jacob's leadership, LR won more than half of the country's small towns in the 2020 French municipal elections; at the same time, however, the party lost in larger cities it had held for decades, including Marseille and Bordeaux.

By 2021, Jacob said he had "no ambition" to campaign for the 2022 French presidential election. At the Republicans' national convention in December 2021, he chaired the 11-member committee which oversaw the party's selection of its candidate for the elections. Ahead of the Republicans' 2022 convention, he endorsed Éric Ciotti as the party's chairman.

== Political positions ==
=== Foreign policy ===
When President François Hollande and the French government sought to bolster the case for military action against President Bashar al-Assad's government amid the Syrian civil war in 2013, Jacob held that an intervention "could only be justified in the framework of the United Nations" and expressed concern that France was out of step with its neighbours, including Germany.

In 2014, Jacob criticized the Socialist majority for backing France's recognition of the State of Palestine as a move to "add fuel to the fire in a region that doesn't need that at all."

Ahead of Hollande's 2015 visit to meet President Vladimir Putin in Moscow, Jacob called on him to push for an end to the European Union sanctions on Russia over the Russo-Ukrainian war.

In July 2019, Jacob voted against the French ratification of the European Union's Comprehensive Economic and Trade Agreement (CETA) with Canada.

=== Domestic policy ===
Amid a 2019 public debate in France about women wearing hijabs in public, Jacob demanded that clothing restrictions applied to teachers and students be extended to parents who sign up for class trips. In an interview with Le Figaro newspaper, he said: "The veil should be banned on all school time. Not just on school premises".

== Personal life ==
Jacob has in the past touted his passion for hunting and featured in full hunting attire in Paris Match magazine in July 2020.

== See also ==
- French government ministers

Political offices
Preceded by Jean-Marc Ayrault	Leader of the Opposition in the National Assembly; 2012–present	Incumbent
