= Isabelle Périgault =

French politician (born 1971)

Member of the National Assembly for Seine-et-Marne's 4th constituency
- In office 22 June 2022 – 9 June 2024
- Preceded by: Christian Jacob
- Succeeded by: Julien Limongi

Personal details
- Born: 4 September 1971 (age 54) Le Raincy, France
- Party: Republican

Isabelle Périgault (born 4 September 1971) is a French politician from The Republicans (LR) who represented the 4th constituency of Seine-et-Marne in the National Assembly from 2022 to 2024.

== See also ==
- List of deputies of the 16th National Assembly of France
