= Jean-Louis Thiériot =

French politician (born 1969)

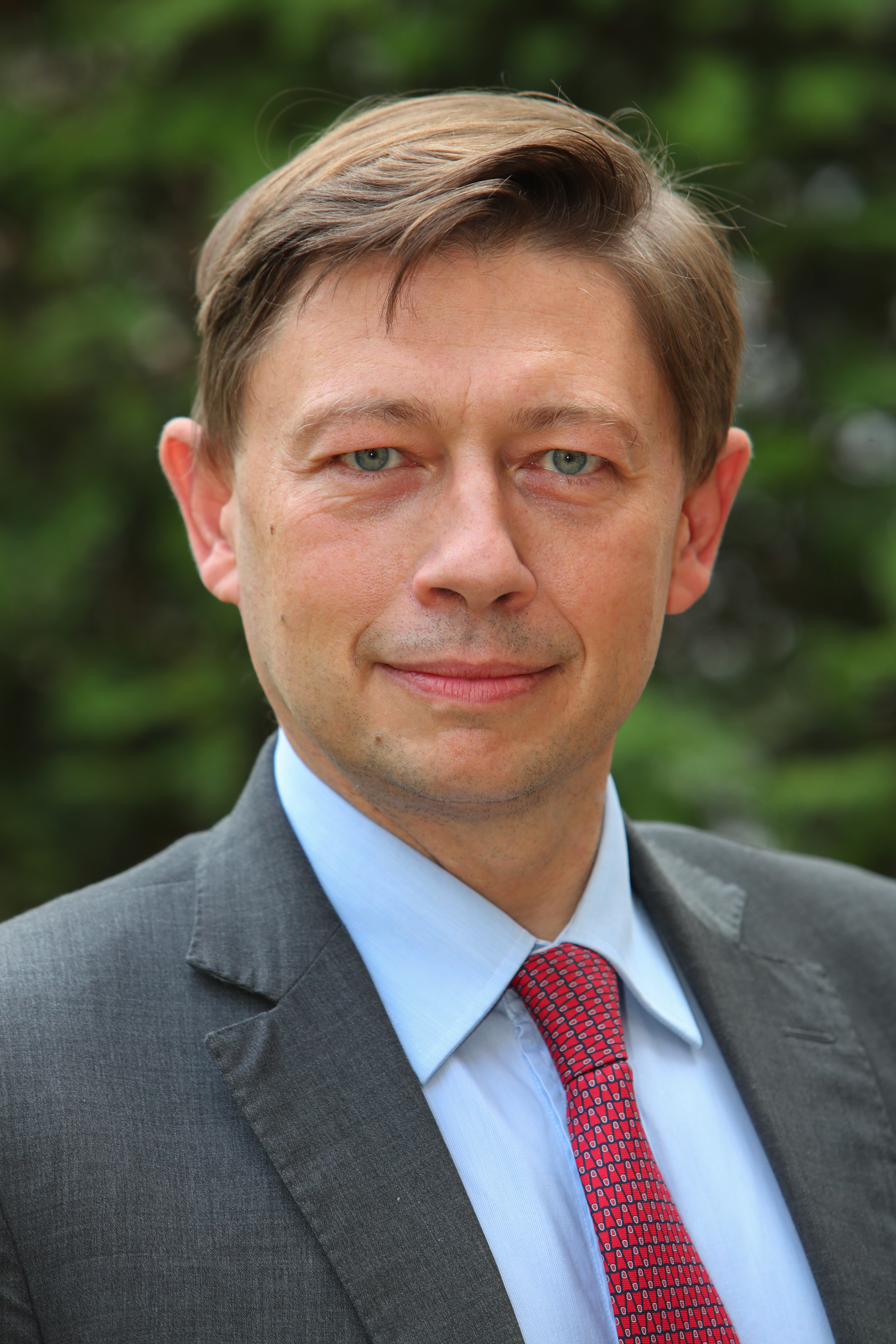

Member of the National Assembly for Seine-et-Marne's 3rd constituency
- Incumbent
- Assumed office 15 July 2018
- Preceded by: Yves Jégo

President of the Departmental Council of Seine-et-Marne
- In office 22 March 2018 – 13 July 2018
- Preceded by: Jean-Jacques Barbaux
- Succeeded by: Patrick Septiers

Mayor of Beauvoir
- In office 30 March 2008 – 13 April 2018
- Preceded by: Henry Cochin
- Succeeded by: Patricia Casier

Personal details
- Born: 26 June 1969 (age 57) 14th arrondissement of Paris, France
- Party: The Republicans (2015–present)
- Other political affiliations: Union for a Popular Movement (until 2015)
- Education: Sciences Po; Panthéon-Assas University
- Occupation: Lawyer

Jean-Louis Thiériot (French: [ʒɑ̃lui tjeʁjo]; born 26 June 1969) is a French politician and essayist who has represented the 3rd constituency of the Seine-et-Marne department in the National Assembly since 2018. A lawyer by occupation, he is a member of The Republicans (LR).

Thiériot previously served as Mayor of Beauvoir (2008–2018) and President of the Departmental Council of Seine-et-Marne (2018), in which he has represented the canton of Nangis since 2015. In the National Assembly, he sits on the National Defence and Armed Forces Committee.

Between September and December 2024, Thiériot briefly served as Minister of Veterans Affairs in the government of Prime Minister Michel Barnier.

== Early life and career ==
A graduate of Sciences Po in Paris, Thiériot holds a post-graduate degree (diplôme d'études approfondies, DEA) in history and a post-graduate diploma (diplôme d'études supérieures spécialisées, DESS) in European business law. He has been described as economically liberal; he has notably written a biography of Margaret Thatcher (2007), which won the Grand Prix de la biographie politique, as well as a book about French Resistance leader and later President Charles de Gaulle: De Gaulle, le dernier réformateur (2018).

A winner of the Prix Robert-Christophe de l'Association des écrivains combattants for his 2009 book on Claus von Stauffenberg, which illustrates his interest in Germany and German-speaking skills, he also wrote France-Allemagne, l'heure de vérité (2011) with Bernard de Montferrand, a former French Ambassador in Berlin (2007–2011). As a member of the National Assembly, Thiériot sits as a member of the Franco-German Parliamentary Assembly.

Thiériot regularly compares the political systems on both sides of the Rhine in articles published by Le Figaro. Among others, he published "L'efficacité de l'Allemagne contre le virus contredit l'argument du manque de moyens" amid the COVID-19 pandemic in 2020.

== Political career ==
Thiériot was elected to the municipal council of Beauvoir, Seine-et-Marne in 1995. He was elected to the mayorship following the 2008 municipal election. In 2015, he was elected to the Departmental Council of Seine-et-Marne in the canton of Nangis.

At the 2012 and 2017 legislative election, Thiériot was the substitute for Yves Jégo in the 3rd constituency of Seine-et-Marne. He became a member of the National Assembly following Jégo's resignation from Parliament due to his retirement from politics.

Active on police, justice and army issues, he is vice chair of the National Defence and Armed Forces Committee (Commission de la défense nationale et des forces armées). He is also vice chair of the Groupe de travail sur la base industrielle et technologique de défense (BITD) within the committee. He chairs the friendship group with Lithuania, holding a vice chairmanship of the friendship groups with Austria, Czechia, Latvia and Denmark. He is a member of the friendship group with Australia. Ahead of the 2022 presidential election, he advised The Republicans nominee Valérie Pécresse on defence matters.

He was an auditor of the 29th national session "security and justice" (2017–2018, Promotion Colonel Arnaud Beltrame) of the (now former) Institut national des hautes études de la sécurité et de la justice (INHESJ) and of the 72nd session "defence policy" of the Institut des hautes études de défense nationale (IHEDN).Remove citation to LinkedIn per WP:RSP; claim remains supported by adjacent citation

Ahead of The Republicans' 2022 convention, Thiériot endorsed Bruno Retailleau for the party leadership, which was eventually won by Éric Ciotti. In late 2023, Thiériot led a call to the government by seventeen The Republicans members of the National Assembly to help pass an immigration bill as amended by the Senate. The members expressed their concern that a watered-down version of the bill would fail to pass the National Assembly; it was indeed rejected prior to examination on 11 December 2023, a first of this political importance since 1998, according to Le Figaro. The bill finally passed by both houses of Parliament on 19 December 2023 was "hardened" compared to the failed version, as Thiériot had suggested.

In 2026, Prime Minister Sébastien Lecornu asked Thiériot and two other parliamentarians from his center-right coalition – Christophe Plassard and Charles Rodwell – to report on France’s economic-security policies and those of its European partners, with particular attention to foreign investment screening.
