= Lords of Brancion =

French aristocratic family

The Lords of Brancion were a French aristocratic family which traced its origins to 10th century Burgundy and were later known as the Counts of Raguet-Brancion.

== Family ==
The line began in a small town near Tournus. Its first member, Varulphe, the Earl of Brancion, controlled towns on the Saône, Rhone and Loire rivers around the year 960. In later centuries the family held the towns of Uxelles and Traves, along with high church offices such as Bishop of Langres and Abbot of Cluny.

By the 19th century the family name had become Raguet-Brancion. Those to bear variants of this name include:

- War hero Colonel Adolphe-Ernest Raguet de Brancion, who died in 1855 at the Siege of Sevastopol.
- Law professor Jacqueline Dutheil de la Rochère (born Jacqueline Geneviève Marie Bernadette Chatel de Raguet de Brancion in 1940).

== Arms ==
The coat of arms is a blue shield with golden waves and two silver towers each topped by a silver rat, or in French heraldic terms:

Ecartelées d'un champ d'azur à trois fasces ondées d'or, à une tour d'argent maçonnée de sable, surmontée d'un rat d'argent passant.

(Quartered with a field of azure with three wavy fesses of gold, with a tower of silver masonry of sand, surmounted by a walking silver rat).
