= Tournus =

- Commune
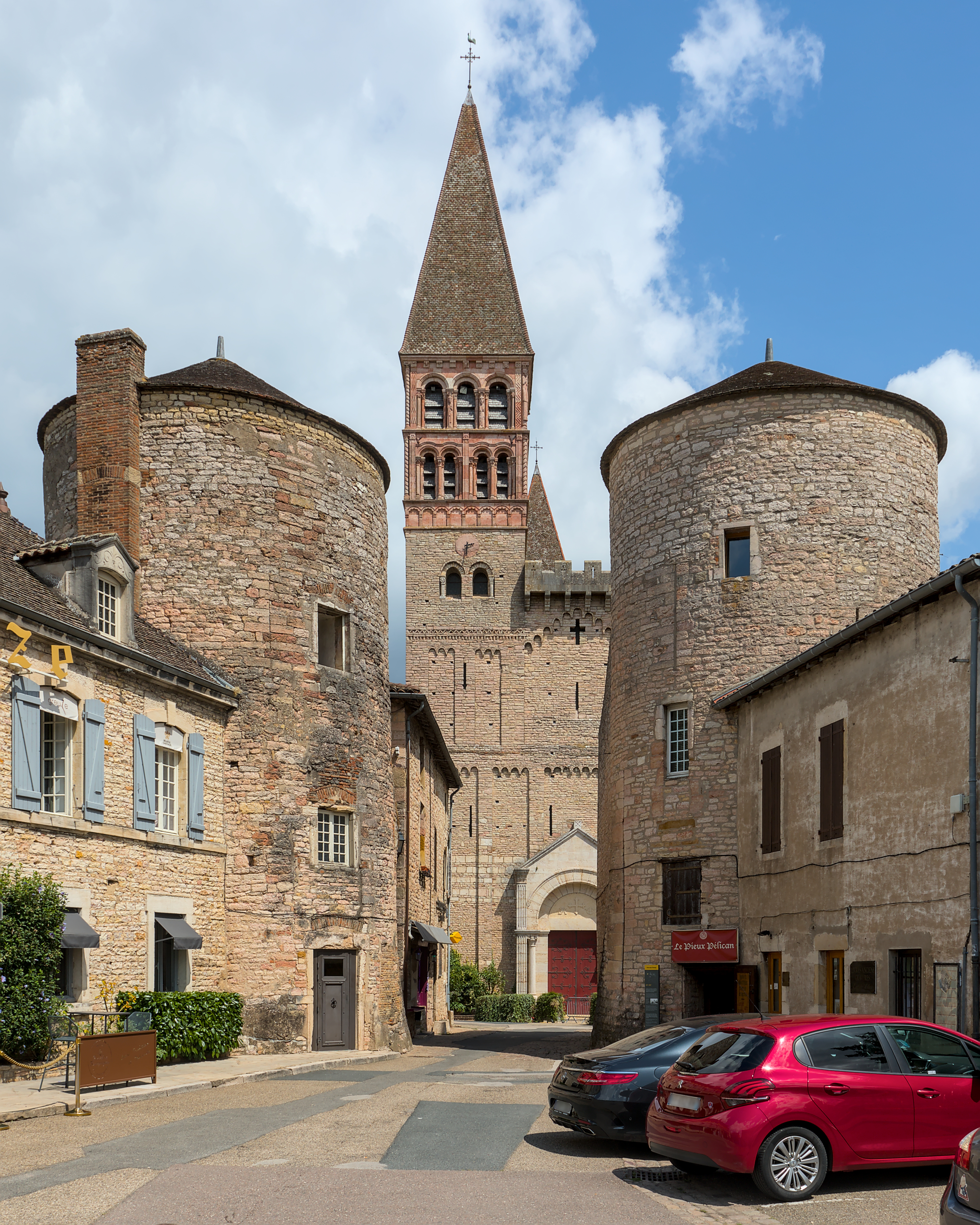
- The abbey in Tournus

- Coat of arms
- Location of Tournus
- Location within France Location within Bourgogne-Franche-Comté
- Coordinates: 46°33′50″N 4°54′33″E
- Country: France
- Region: Bourgogne-Franche-Comté
- Department: Saône-et-Loire
- Arrondissement: Mâcon
- Canton: Tournus
- Intercommunality: Mâconnais - Tournugeois

Government
  - Mayor (2020–2026): Bertrand Veau
- Area^{1}: 25 km^{2} (9.7 sq mi)
- Elevation: 193 m (633 ft)
- Highest elevation: 353 m (1,158 ft)
- Lowest elevation: 168 m (551 ft)
- Population (2023): 5,701
  - Density: 230/km^{2} (590/sq mi)
- Time zone: UTC+01:00 (CET)
  - Summer (DST): UTC+02:00 (CEST)
- INSEE/Postal code: 71543 /71700
- ^{1} French Land Register data, which excludes lakes, ponds, glaciers > 1 km^{2} (0.386 sq mi or 247 acres) and river estuaries.

Tournus (French pronunciation: [tuʁny]) is a commune in the Saône-et-Loire department in the region of Bourgogne-Franche-Comté in eastern France.

== Geography ==
Tournus is located on the right bank of the Saône, 20 km. northeast of Mâcon on the Paris-Lyon railway. In 1972 Tournus absorbed the former commune Plottes.

== Population ==
Population data refer to the area corresponding with the commune as of January 2025.

Historical population
Year	Pop.	±% p.a.
1968	6,673	—
1975	6,978	+0.64%
1982	6,343	−1.35%
1990	5,927	−0.84%
1999	5,629	−0.57%
2007	5,941	+0.68%
2012	5,849	−0.31%
2017	5,545	−1.06%
2023	5,701	+0.46%
Source: INSEE

== Sights ==
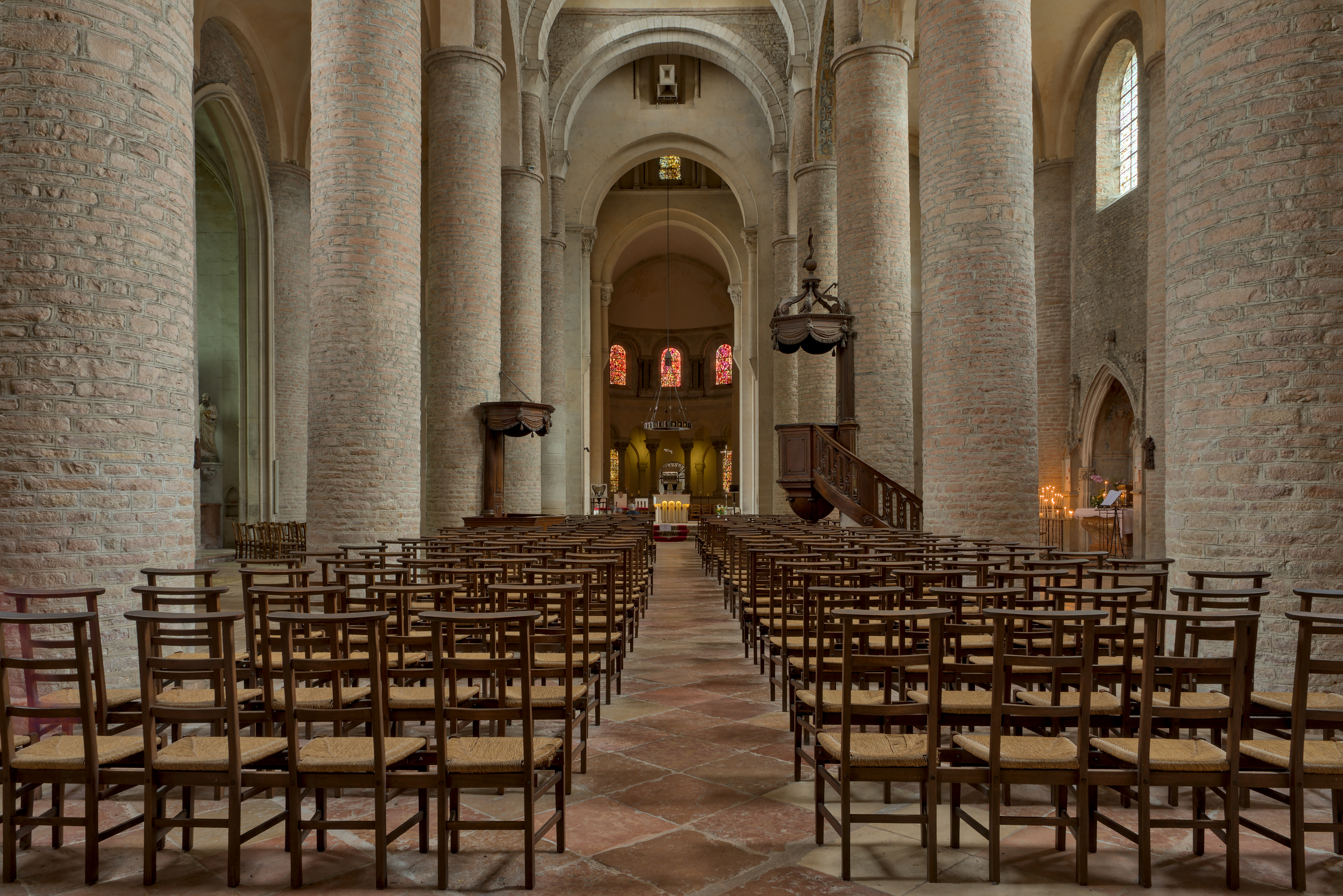
Nave of the abbey church

The church of St Philibert (early 11th century), is the main surviving building of the former Benedictine abbey of Tournus, suppressed in 1785. It is in the Burgundian Romanesque style. The façade lacks one of the two flanking towers originally designed for it. The nave is roofed with barrel vaulting, supported on tall cylindrical columns. Both the choir and the 11th century crypt beneath it have an ambulatory and side chapels.

In the Place de l'Hôtel de Ville stands a statue of Jean-Baptiste Greuze, born in the town in 1725. The town has a collection of his artworks and in 2025 there was a special exhibition to mark the anniversary of his birth.

== Economy ==
Tournus is an important tourist area, with one four-star hotel (the Greuze) and one three-star hotel (the Rempart). In 2013, four restaurants had a Michelin star: the Greuze, Quartier Gourmand, Aux Terrasses, and Meulien.

There are vineyards in the surrounding district and the town and its port have considerable commerce in wine and in stone from the neighboring quarries. Chairmaking was an important industry.

There are several industrial areas to the north and south-west. The town manufactures a large quantity of domestic white goods, at the Groupe SEB factory, and cookware at the Tefal factory.

There is a market every Saturday morning.

== Sport ==
- On 9 June 2009, the town was the start of the 182 km (113 mi) Stage 3 of the Critérium du Dauphiné Libéré cycle race.
- On 10 July 2010, the town was en route of the 165.5 km (102.8 mi) Stage 7 of the Tour de France cycle race.

== Notable people ==
- Jean-Baptiste Greuze (1725–1805), painter.
- Albert Thibaudet (1874–1936), a French essayist and literary critic.
- Gabriel Voisin (1880–1973), aviation and automobile pioneer.
- Marie-Hélène Mathieu, (born 1929), religious worker for disabled people.
- Josiane Bost (born 1956), a French former racing cyclist

== See also ==
- Communes of the Saône-et-Loire department
- Lords of Brancion
