= Arrondissements of the Seine-et-Marne department =

Historical overview article

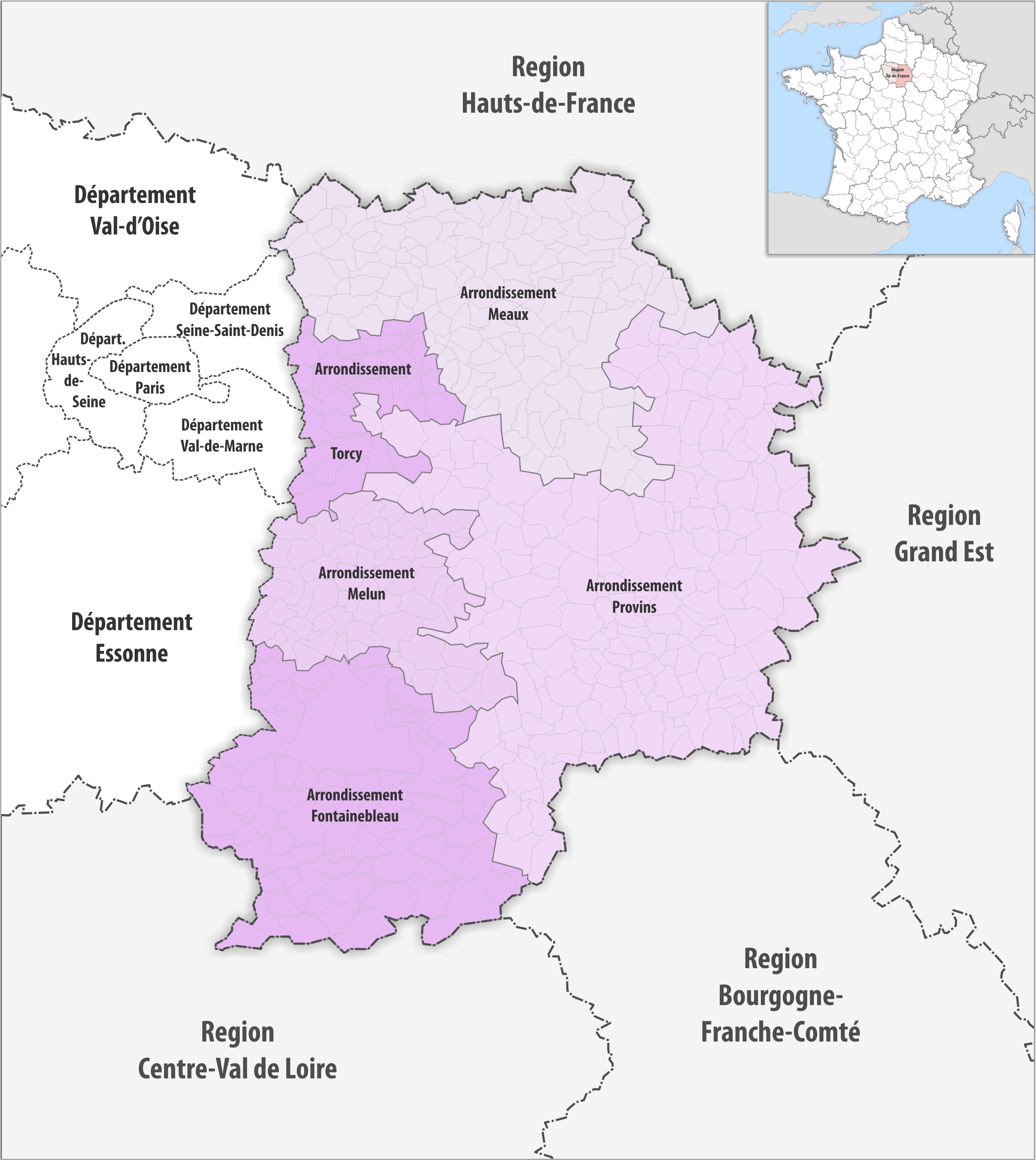
Map of arrondissements of the Seine-et-Marne department.

The 5 arrondissements of the Seine-et-Marne department are:

1. Arrondissement of Fontainebleau, (subprefecture: Fontainebleau) with 85 communes. The population of the arrondissement was 156,450 in 2021.
2. Arrondissement of Meaux, (subprefecture: Meaux) with 139 communes. The population of the arrondissement was 342,766 in 2021.
3. Arrondissement of Melun, (prefecture of the Seine-et-Marne department: Melun) with 59 communes. The population of the arrondissement was 289,693 in 2021.
4. Arrondissement of Provins, (subprefecture: Provins) with 174 communes. The population of the arrondissement was 186,339 in 2021.
5. Arrondissement of Torcy, (subprefecture: Torcy) with 50 communes. The population of the arrondissement was 462,852 in 2021.

== History ==
In 1800 the arrondissements of Melun, Coulommiers, Fontainebleau, Meaux and Provins were established. The arrondissements of Coulommiers and Fontainebleau were disbanded in 1926, and Fontainebleau was restored in 1988. In February 1993 the arrondissement of Noisiel was created from parts of the arrondissements of Melun and Meaux. Torcy replaced Noisiel as subprefecture in April 1994. In January 2006 the arrondissement of Provins absorbed the canton of Rebais from the arrondissement of Meaux and the canton of Rozay-en-Brie from the arrondissement of Melun.

The borders of the arrondissements of Seine-et-Marne were changed in January 2017:

- seven communes from the arrondissement of Fontainebleau to the arrondissement of Provins
- 10 communes from the arrondissement of Melun to the arrondissement of Fontainebleau
- 15 communes from the arrondissement of Melun to the arrondissement of Provins
- seven communes from the arrondissement of Melun to the arrondissement of Torcy
- 10 communes from the arrondissement of Provins to the arrondissement of Meaux
- five communes from the arrondissement of Torcy to the arrondissement of Meaux
- two communes from the arrondissement of Torcy to the arrondissement of Provins

In August 2018 the communes Villeneuve-le-Comte and Villeneuve-Saint-Denis passed from the arrondissement of Provins to the arrondissement of Torcy.
