= Louis Vogel =

French politician

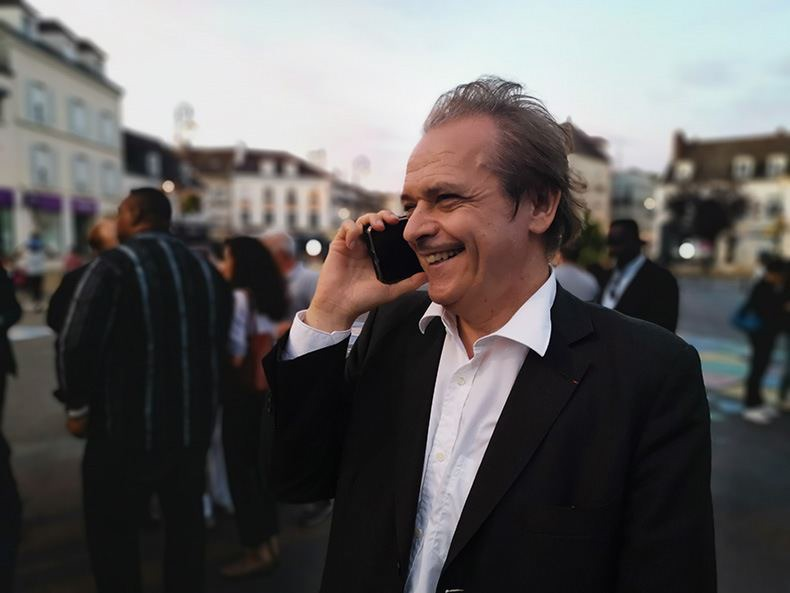

Mayor of Melun
- Incumbent
- Assumed office 7 April 2016
- Preceded by: Gérard Millet

8th President of Panthéon-Assas University
- In office 2006–2012
- Preceded by: Jacqueline Dutheil de la Rochère
- Succeeded by: Guillaume Leyte

Personal details
- Born: 28 October 1954 (age 71) Saarbrücken, Saar Protectorate
- Education: Paris Institute of Political Studies; Yale Law School; Panthéon-Assas University
- Website: louisvogel.net

Louis Vogel (born 1954) is a French jurist, professor and politician. He was President of Panthéon-Assas University from 2006 to 2012 and president of the Conférence des Présidents d'Université. He is the director of the Paris Institute of Comparative Law. In April 2016, he became the mayor of Melun.

He has studied at the Paris Institute of Political Studies, Yale Law School, and Panthéon-Assas.

== Works ==
- L'Université, une chance pour la France (2010)
