= Departmental Council of Seine-et-Marne =

Departmental legislature in France

The Departmental Council of Seine-et-Marne (French: Conseil départemental de Seine-et-Marne) is the deliberative assembly of the Seine-et-Marne department in the region of Île-de-France. It consists of 46 members (general councilors) from 23 cantons and its headquarters are in Melun.

The president of the General Council is Jean-François Parigi.

== Vice-presidents ==
The president of the Departmental Council is assisted by 13 vice-presidents chosen from among the departmental advisers. Each of them has a delegation of authority.

List of vice-presidents of the Seine-et-Marne Departmental Council (as of 2021)
Order	Name	Party	Canton	Delegation
1st	Olivier Lavenka	LR	Provins	Land use planning, roads, contractual policies and agriculture
2nd	Daisy Luczak	LR	Fontenay-Trésigny	Finance, human resources and public
3rd	Brice Rabaste	UD	Chelles	Transport and mobility
4th	Anne Gbiorczyk	DVD	Serris	Children, families and medical presence
5th	Bernard Cozic	LR	Nemours	Solidarity
6th	Sarah Lacroix	LR	Meaux	Youth, educational success and educational innovation
7th	Xavier Vanderbise	UCD	Villeparisis	Colleges
8th	Béatrice Rucheton	LR	Fontainebleau	Environment
9th	Denis Jullemier	LR	Melun	Habitat, housing, urban renewal and city policy
10th	Véronique Veau	LR	Saint-Fargeau-Ponthierry	Culture and heritage
11th	Christian Robache	LR	Lagny-sur-Marne	Security and departmental buildings
12th	Nathalie Beaulnes-Sereni	LR	Melun	Higher education and vocational training
13th	Bouchra Fenzar-Rizki	LR	Lagny-sur-Marne	Sports

== See also ==
- Seine-et-Marne
- General councils of France
