= Aymeric Durox =

French politician (born 1985)

Member of the Senate
- Incumbent
- Assumed office 2 October 2023
- Constituency: Seine-et-Marne

Personal details
- Born: 6 August 1985 (age 40)
- Party: National Rally

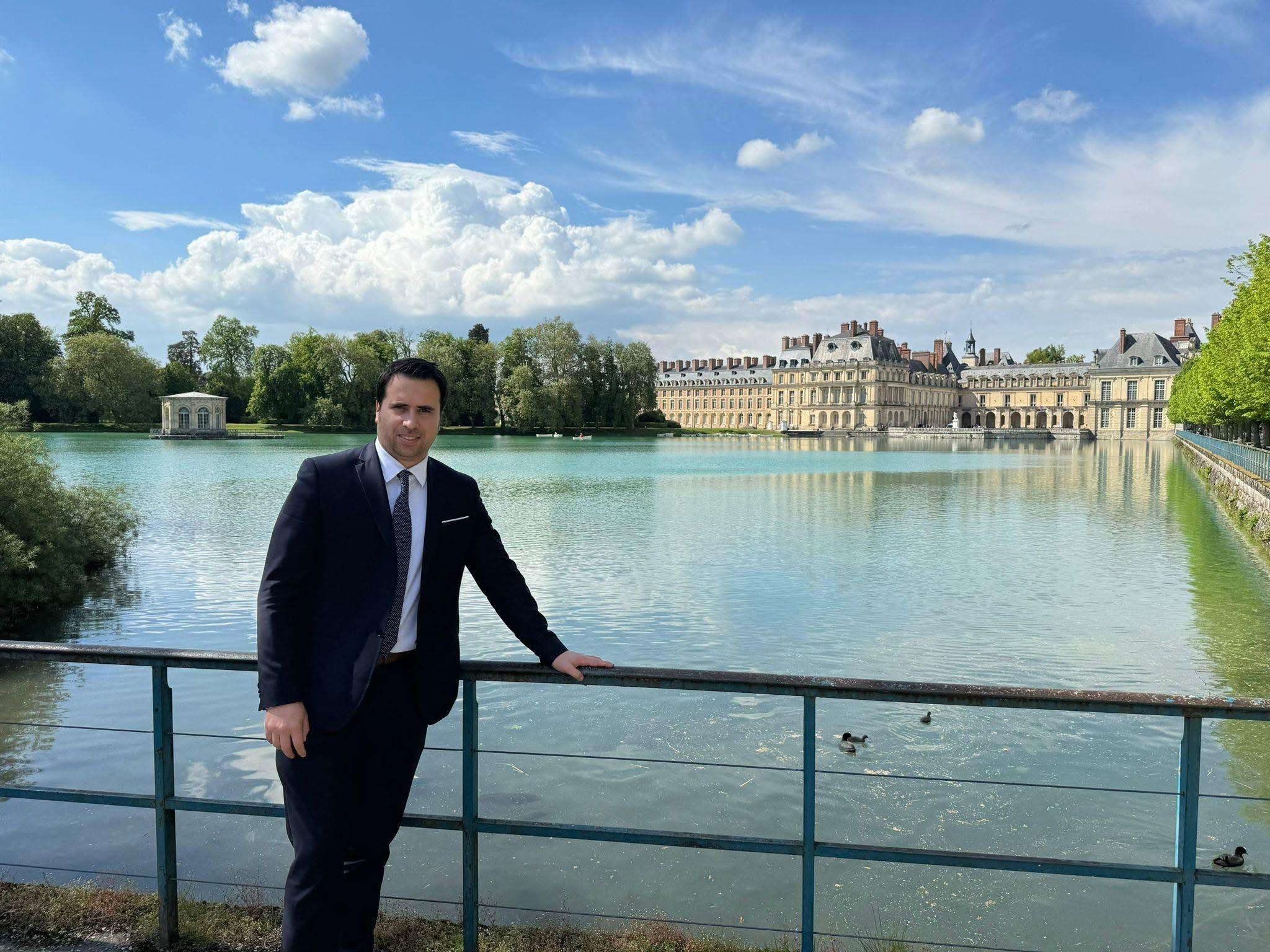
Aymeric Durox

Aymeric Durox (born 6 August 1985) is a French politician of the National Rally. Since 2023, he has been a member of the Senate. In the 2021 regional elections, he was elected member of the Regional Council of Île-de-France. He was a candidate for Seine-et-Marne's 3rd constituency in the 2017 legislative election, and a candidate for Seine-et-Marne's 4th constituency in the 2022 election.
