= Seine-et-Marne's 4th constituency =

Constituency of the National Assembly of France

4th constituency of Seine-et-Marne
- inline Constituency of the National Assembly of France

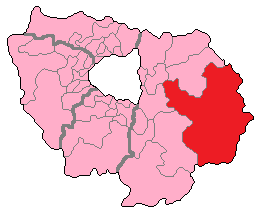
- Seine-et-Marne's 4th Constituency shown within Île-de-France
- Deputy: Isabelle Périgault; LR
- Department: Seine-et-Marne
- Cantons: Provins – Nangis – Bray-sur-Seine – Donnemarie-Dontilly – Villiers-Saint-Georges – La Ferté-Gaucher – Rebais – Rozay-en-Brie
- Registered voters: 85,120

The 4th constituency of Seine-et-Marne is a French legislative constituency in the Seine-et-Marne département.

== Description ==
The 4th constituency of Seine-et-Marne is the largest constituency in the department and covers its rural east.

The seat has been solidly conservative since 1988. Christian Jacob won the seat in 1997 served as a minister under Jean-Pierre Raffarin and as President of the UMP group in the National Assembly since 2010.

== Historic representation ==
Election	Member	Party
1958	Alain Peyrefitte	UNR
1962	Michel Vincent	UNR
1962	Alain Peyrefitte	UNR
1966	Roger Pezout	UNR
1967	Alain Peyrefitte	UDR
1967		UDR
1968	Alain Peyrefitte	UDR
1973	Alain Peyrefitte	UDR
1973	Étienne Pinte	UDR
1978	Alain Peyrefitte	RPR
1978	Claude Eymard-Duvernay	RPR
1981	Marc Fromion	PS
1982	Alain Peyrefitte	RPR
1986	Proportional representation – no election by constituency	
1988	Alain Peyrefitte	RPR
1993	Alain Peyrefitte	RPR
1995	Christian Jacob	RPR
1997	Christian Jacob	RPR
2002	Christian Jacob	UMP
2002	Ghislain Bray	UMP
2007	Christian Jacob	UMP
2012	Christian Jacob	UMP
2017	Christian Jacob	LR
2022	Isabelle Périgault	LR

== Election results ==
=== 2024 ===
Candidate	Party	Alliance	First round			Second round		
Candidate	Party	Alliance	Votes	%	+/–	Votes	%	+/–
Julien Limongi	RN		27,317	47.64	+16.91	29,118	51.70	+2.86
Isabelle Périgault	LR		16,060	28.01	+6.29	27,203	48.30	-2.86
Mathieu Garnier	LFI	NFP	11,986	20.90	+0.66	WITHDREW		
Jean-Yves Gaudey	LO		1,070	1.87	+0.97			
Nicolas Fauveau	REC		907	1.58	-2.73			
Valid votes			57,340	97.32	-0.77	56,321	96.03	+3.74
Blank votes			1,178	2.00	+0.59	1,751	2.99	-3.08
Null votes			399	0.68	+0.18	579	0.99	-0.66
Turnout			58,917	66.43	+18.84	58,651	66.11	+21.13
Abstentions			29,780	33.57	-18.84	30,064	33.89	-21.13
Registered voters			88,697			88,715		
Source: Ministry of the Interior, Le Monde
Result						RN GAIN FROM LR		

=== 2022 ===
Legislative Election 2022: Seine-et-Marne's 4th constituency
Party	Candidate	Votes	%	±%
RN	Aymeric Durox	12,742	30.73	+9.66
LR (UDC)	Isabelle Périgault	9,007	21.72	-11.19
LFI (NUPÉS)	Mathieu Garnier	8,394	20.24	+3.17
Agir (Ensemble)	Jean-Philippe Delvaux	6,953	16.77	−9.66
REC	Frederic Venant	1,786	4.31	N/A
PA	Gabrielle Huot	963	2.32	N/A
Others	N/A	2,583	6.09	
Turnout		41,465	47.59	−0.62
2nd round result
LR (UDC)	Isabelle Périgault	18,866	51.16	-10.61
RN	Aymeric Durox	18,007	48.84	N/A
Turnout		36,873	44.98	+6.40
LR hold				

=== 2017 ===
Legislative Election 2017: Seine-et-Marne's 4th constituency
Party	Candidate	Votes	%	±%
LR	Christian Jacob	13,743	32.42	
LREM	Emmanuel Marcadet	11,045	26.05	
FN	Pierre Cherrier	8,636	20.37	
LFI	Julie Garnier-Martinez	4,504	10.62	
PS	Olivier Husson	1,390	3.28	
EELV	Quentin Picquenot	1,147	2.71	
Others	N/A	1,928		
Turnout		42,393	48.21	
2nd round result
LR	Christian Jacob	20,957	61.77	
LREM	Emmanuel Marcadet	12,973	38.23	
Turnout		33,930	38.58	
LR hold				

=== 2012 ===
Legislative Election 2012: Seine-et-Marne's 4th constituency
Party	Candidate	Votes	%	±%
UMP	Christian Jacob	21,420	43.44	
PS	Célia Firmin	13,875	28.14	
FN	Pascal Aberlen	9,084	18.42	
FG	Martine Marchand	2,322	4.71	
Others	N/A	2,605		
Turnout		49,984	58.72	
2nd round result
UMP	Christian Jacob	27,215	59.26	
PS	Célia Firmin	18,707	40.74	
Turnout		47,388	55.67	
UMP hold				

=== 2007 ===
Legislative Election 2007: Seine-et-Marne's 4th constituency
Party	Candidate	Votes	%	±%
UMP	Christian Jacob	26,813	54.67	
PS	Serge Rossiere-Rollin	9,236	18.83	
MoDem	Jacques Benoit	3,275	6.68	
FN	Pascal Aberlen	3,024	6.17	
PCF	Simone Jerome	1,739	3.55	
LV	Stéphane Ferrari	1,470	3.00	
Far left	Nadine Thiant	1,158	2.36	
Others	N/A	2,326		
Turnout		49,808	60.61	
UMP hold				

=== 2002 ===
Legislative Election 2002: Seine-et-Marne's 4th constituency
Party	Candidate	Votes	%	±%
UMP	Christian Jacob	20,913	43.99	
PS	Dominique Binet	10,320	21.71	
FN	Alain Bruneau	8,156	17.15	
PCF	Simone Jerome	1,999	4.20	
LV	Claudine Foy	1,439	3.03	
Others	N/A	4,718		
Turnout		48,552	63.43	
2nd round result
UMP	Christian Jacob	26,108	62.26	
PS	Dominique Binet	15,828	37.74	
Turnout		44,025	57.52	
UMP hold				

=== 1997 ===
Legislative Election 1997: Seine-et-Marne's 4th constituency
Party	Candidate	Votes	%	±%
RPR	Christian Jacob	14,010	30.27	
FN	Jacques Gérard	10,569	22.84	
PS	Dominique Binet	10,031	21.67	
PCF	Yves Rouveyre	4,371	9.44	
DVD	Jacques Durrande	1,889	4.08	
GE	François Bouygues	1,671	3.61	
DIV	Didier Sambourg	1,187	2.56	
Far left	Françoise Cottin	1,169	2.53	
Others	N/A	1,387		
Turnout		48,634	67.38	
2nd round result
RPR	Christian Jacob	22,524	44.22	
PS	Dominique Binet	19,656	38.59	
FN	Jacques Gérard	8,757	17.19	
Turnout		52,647	72.95	
RPR hold				

== Sources ==
Official results of French elections from 2002: "Résultats électoraux officiels en France" (in French).
