= Jacqueline Dutheil de la Rochère =

7th President of Panthéon-Assas University
- In office 2002–2006
- Preceded by: Bernard Teyssié
- Succeeded by: Louis Vogel

Personal details
- Born: Jacqueline Geneviève Marie Bernadette Chatel de Raguet de Brancion; 18 December 1940 (age 85) Nîmes, France
- Spouse: Stéphane Marie Jacques Dutheil de La Rochère
- Parent(s): Jacques Chatel de Raguet de Brancion; Françoise Barbier
- Education: Sciences Po; Paris Descartes University

Jacqueline Dutheil de la Rochère (born 1940) is a French aristocrat, Professor Emerita of Law and former President of Panthéon-Assas University in Paris.

== Early life ==
Jacqueline de Raguet de Brancion was born on December 18, 1940, in Nîmes, France. Her father was Jacques Chatel de Raguet de Brancion and her mother, Françoise Barbier.

She graduated from Sciences Po. She received a Doctorate in Law and the agrégation from Paris Descartes University in 1988.

== Career ==
She taught Public Law at Panthéon-Assas University. She served as its President.

She serves as President and Director of EJ BARBIER. She also serves on the Board of Directors of EPC Groupe.

== Personal life ==
She married Stéphane Marie Jacques Dutheil de La Rochère in 1966.

== See also ==
- Lords of Brancion
