= Codevelopment =

Codevelopment is a trend of thought and a development strategy in development studies which considers migrants to be a developing factor for their countries of origin.

Although it is widely accepted that it was French scholar Sami Naïr who first coined the word codevelopment, it is believed this phenomenon has existed alongside migrations since they exist. Traditionally, immigrants (especially those who migrate for economic reasons) have, collectively or individually, supported their communities of origin.

In 1997 Sami Naïr, while directing the Interministerial Mission on Migration/Codevelopment, defined this last concept as a proposal for integrating immigration and development in a way that migration fluxes will benefit both the country of origin and the country of destination. This is, a consensual relationship between two countries that will allow migration to the country of destiny not to imply an equivalent loss in the country of origin.

Adherents to this model believe that it fosters mutual collaboration among countries in a way that traditional and hierarchical north–south development focus did not. In this context, immigrant initiatives enrich the countries of origin both from a cultural and a human resources perspective. Their condition as transnational citizens would allow them a better understanding of the needs of both the communities of origin and destination. For this reason, their participation in projects involving members of their communities, in both “their” countries would be more effective, as priorities and needs would be correctly identified. On the other hand, this participation would also work as an integrating force in the destination countries, as they would be perceived as an enriching factor by the public opinion and institutions.

== Migration control ==
In countries receiving immigration, codevelopment has been implemented by the institutions in a different way. Since they were first implemented in France, codevelopment initiatives in Europe have been frequently linked to control of the migration fluxes, often promoting the return of immigrants.

At a European level, codevelopment was first mentioned during the Tampere Summit held in October 1999, when the European Council defined 5 guidelines for the new European migration policy aimed at a common space of "Liberty, Security and Justice". Anyhow, critics consider that Tampere quickly shifted towards a Fortress Europe mentality, limiting development aid to those countries willing to implement migration control measures and accepting repatriations.

An example of this tendency may be found in the imbalance between the 23 million euro budget that the EU plans on investing in the Schengen Information System and the Visa Information System (aimed at a further immigrant identification and control) with the 3 million euro budget (4 million in its second year) granted to codevelopment projects.

== Spain ==
Since the late nineties, codevelopment has been the subject of postgraduate studies, specialist courses, discussions and forums among multiple stakeholders, as well as calls for project grants by some local and regional administrations, beginning with the Municipality of Madrid. These authorities quickly became aware of the local impact of the presence of new immigrant communities, the importance of the links that bind them with their communities of origin, and the desirability of relating them in any future action to support the policies of cooperation. Other countries that experience timely migration as a result of an increase in workforce demand view Codevelopment policies as their main method of influencing and facilitating such operations. Such policies had a much stronger presence and development in the regional and local levels.

At the state level, in accordance with Tampere Summit on Migration, the GRECO Plan on migration management (Programa Global de Regulación y Coordinación de la Extranjería y la Inmigración 2000–2004), was launched by the Interior Ministry in 2001. This Plan devoted an important space for “joint development”, in line with the policies of Tampere and the French government. GRECO insisted on technical and educational cooperation, the voluntary return of migrants, the channelling of migrants’ remittances to development projects, and finally, on the cooperation with those governments that were ready to accept the returned illegal migrants, as well as to control the exit of their citizens with destination Spain. Codevelopment was not mentioned as a policy line in the Immigration law passed in 2000 and did not receive proper funding within the GRECO's framework.

Since late 2004, codevelopment policies have been open to discussion, including the contents, limits, and plans. Two state agencies claimed their space in codevelopment actions: the State Secretary for International Cooperation, Ministry of Foreign Affairs, and the brand new General Directorate of Immigrants’ Integration, at the Ministry of Labour and Social Affairs.

=== Policy ===
During 2005 there has been progress in the search for a consensus on competences and actors. A codevelopment line was mainstreamed in the Master Plans on Development Cooperation, and two years later, also in the new Integration Plan, called Strategic Plan on Citizenship and Integration 2007–2010, which was finally implemented in 2007, by the Ministry of Labour and Migration.

Regional and local authorities soon adopted this win/win approach and consequently launched several codevelopment guidelines within their Integration Plans and Development Cooperation Strategies. Ending 2009, most of the Spanish Regions (Comunidades Autónomas) had considered codevelopment and had set up budget lines both for migrants' associations and Development NGOs. Graciela Malgesini argues that codevelopment and migrants' remittances partly redirect the decentralized cooperation funds to their countries of origin.

=== Current definitions ===
In the last ten years, academic research on codevelopment increased, as a result of the strong immigration process experienced by the Spanish society from 2000 onwards (which represented nearly 80% of Spain's demographic growth). Many universities decided to open up new learning courses on the matter, following the steps of the Universidad Autónoma de Madrid. Several doctoral thesis are currently being carried out, focusing diverse aspects of codevelopment, including the impact of migration and remittances in the sending countries, mainly Ecuador, Colombia and Morocco. Migrants living in Spain remitted nearly €10 billion, in 2007 (while the overall Spanish OAD summed only half of this amount).

According to Graciela Malgesini, spontaneous codevelopment could be defined as the win/win effect, the linkage between migration and development, which generates mostly positive impacts on both the society of origin of immigrants, and the host society. This definition presumes the role of immigrants as actors and vectors of development, in "both sides", and the understanding of the relations between host countries (North) and sending countries (South) in a horizontal way. Codevelopment is directly related to Transnationalism.

Carlos Gimenez pinpointed other two characteristics of codevelopment: (1) The multiplicity of stakeholders (a network of participants that surpasses both quantitatively and qualitatively the traditional agents in the traditional development cooperation projects, as it includes authorities, social organizations, trade unions, universities, training institutes, businesses and immigrant associations). (2) Transnational citizenship (immigrants acting in codevelopment activities, embedded in a transnational dynamic, are also transnational citizens, to the extent that they have a dual presence. This dual space of belonging, in turn, encourages decision making, influences on the economic, political and social development, and allows the formation of a separate identity, based on two geographical areas, the country of origin and the country of destination).

=== Practice ===
Transnationalism and codevelopment are spreading. In Latin America, covedelopment is a relatively new idea, but it has been embraced by grassroots organizations. For example, on November 25, 2010, FAMIGRANTES—the Federation of associations gathering migrants' family members in South America—gathered in their 4th Meeting on Migration and Codevelopment, in Rosario, Argentina. They stated that the codevelopment approach was the best way of understanding the contribution that their relatives were making both in the reception countries and in their homelands (www.famigrantes.org and www.famisur.org). At the same time, more than 100 migrants' associations launched FEDACOD (Federation of Associations for Codevelopment) in Valencia, Spain, on September 24, 2010 (www.fedacod.com). In Africa, diaspora of developing countries contributes greatly to trade policies which facilitate the implementation of new technology, which in turn assists education and other systems of infrastructure within the migrant's new residence. Codevelopment policies are one of the prominent focuses of human-rights groups that seek to improve migrant lives and discourage discrimination.

In Europe, higher barriers created in recent years as a result of legislation to combat fears of domestic terrorism have made it harder to track incoming migrants, as well as those who have sought asylum in the past. Despite a heavy reliance on these migrants for low cost labor, general awareness of the development impacts of migrants remains limited.
