= Sami Nair =

French political philosopher (born 1946)

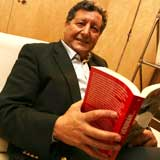

Sami Nair (born 23 August 1946, in Tlemcen) is an Algerian-born French political philosopher who coined the term "codevelopment". A specialist on migration movements and their socio-political effects, he advised the government of Lionel Jospin from 1997–1999, and the European Parliament until 2004. Since 2001 he has been vice president of the Citizen and Republican Movement.
