= Julien Limongi =

French politician

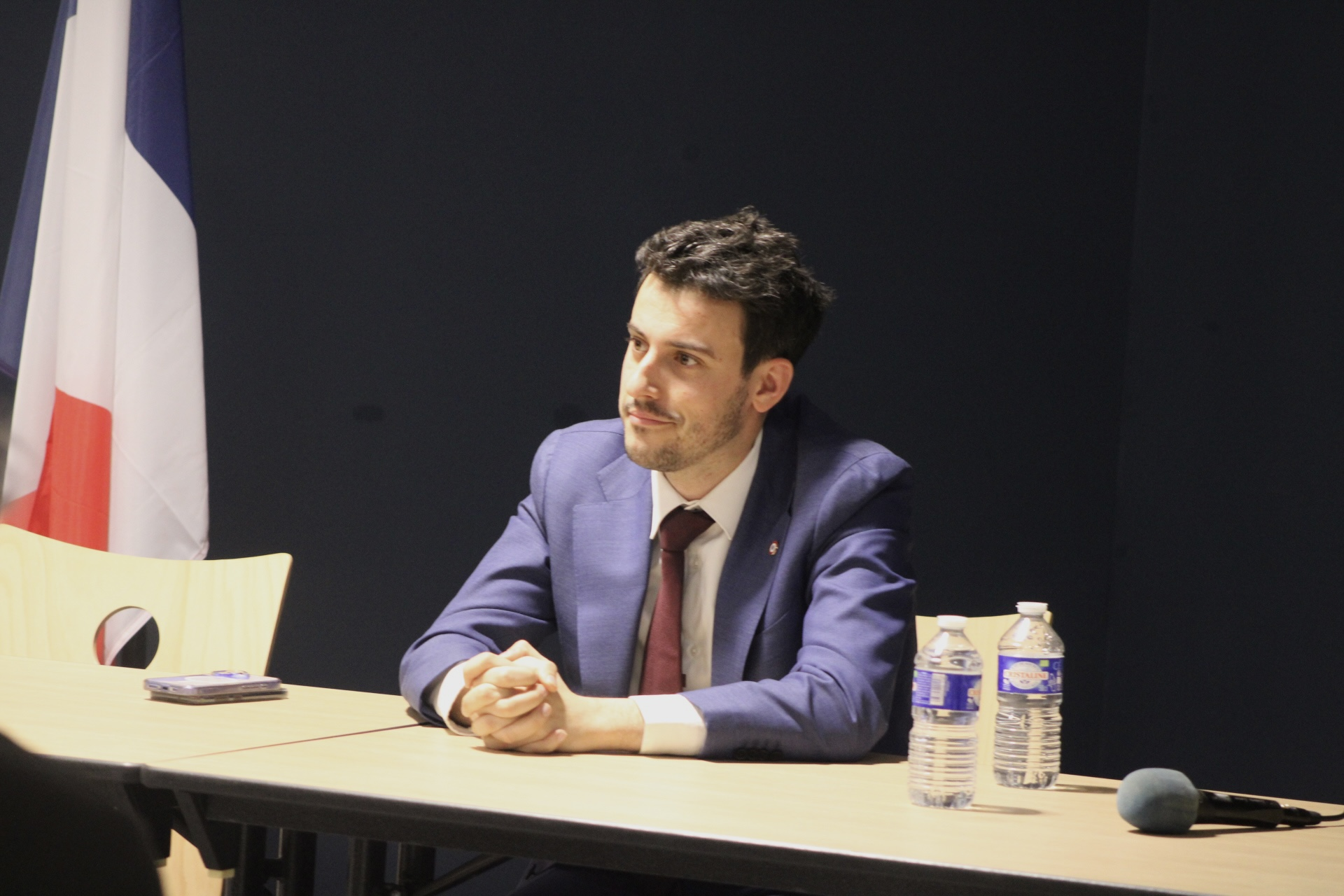

Member of the French National Assembly for Seine-et-Marne's 4th constituency
- Incumbent
- Assumed office 18 July 2024
- Preceded by: Isabelle Périgault

Personal details
- Born: 12 February 1996 (age 29)
- Political party: National Rally

Julien Limongi is a French politician of the National Rally who was elected member of the National Assembly for Seine-et-Marne's 4th constituency in 2024. He is a native of Jouarre.
