= Gérard Millet =

French politician

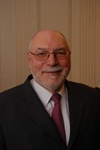
Gérard Millet

Gérard Millet (born 20 January 1939 in Melun, Seine-et-Marne) is a member of the National Assembly of France. He represents the Seine-et-Marne department, and is a member of the Union for a Popular Movement.
