= Seine-et-Marne =

Department of France in Île-de-France

- Department of France
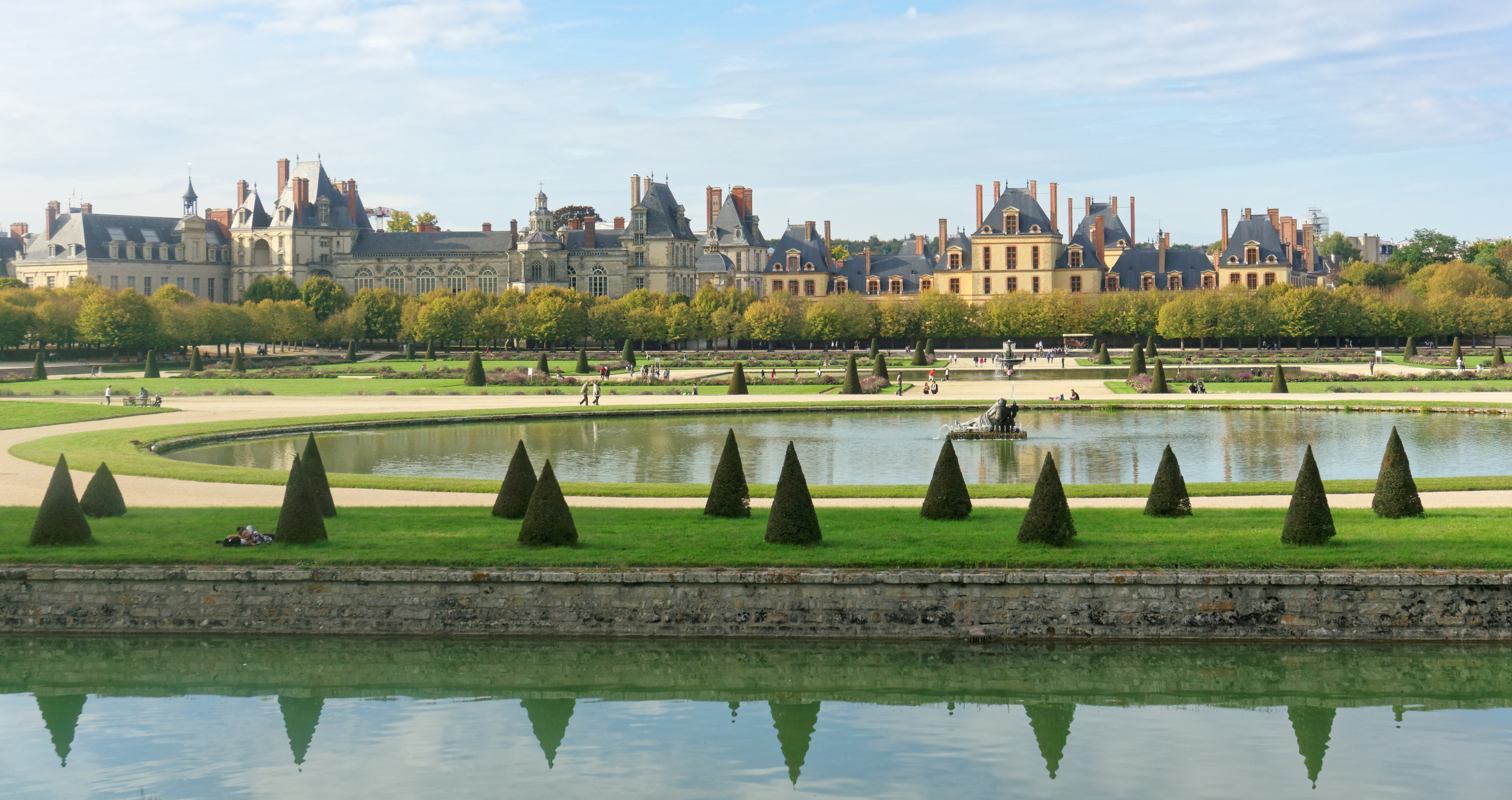
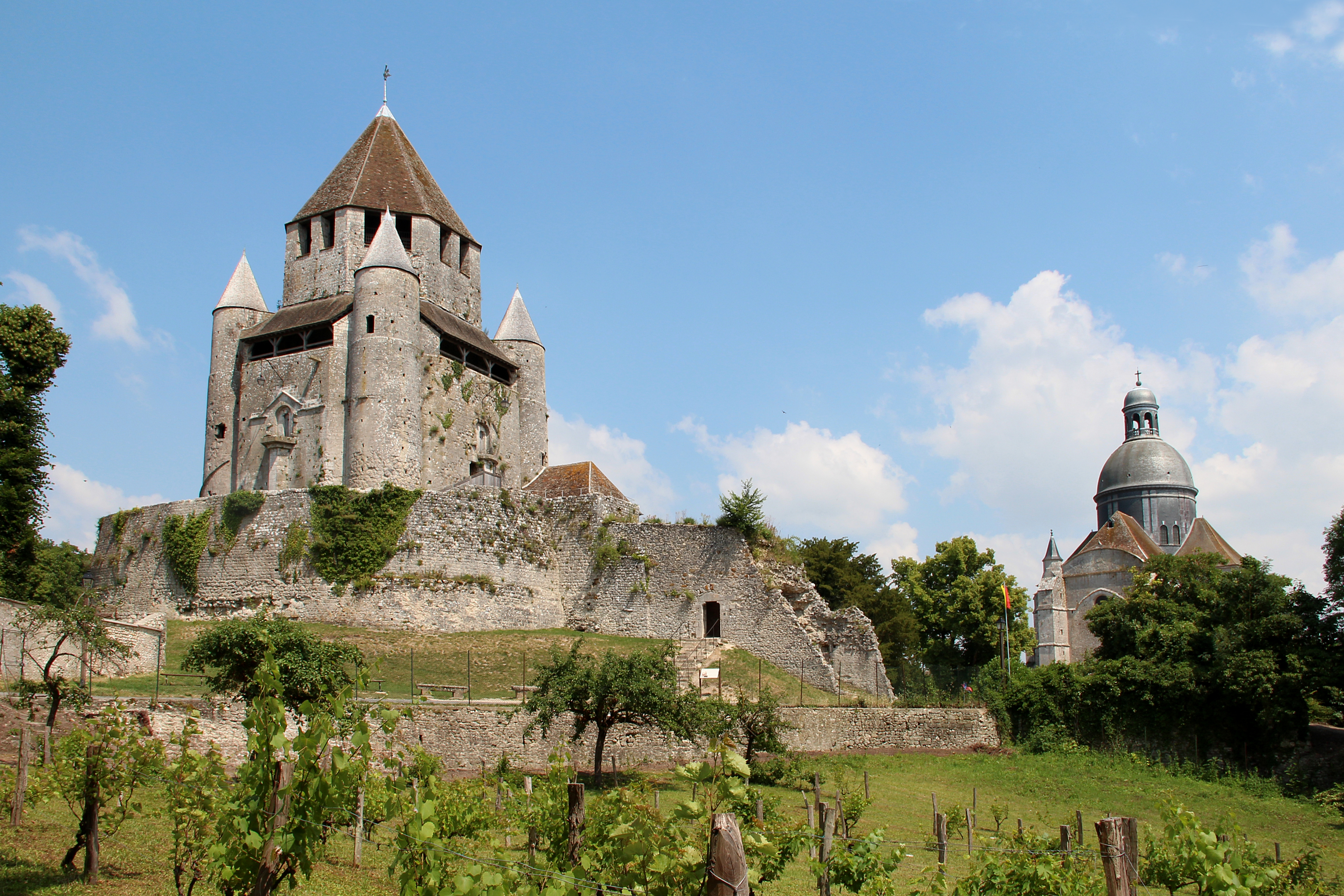
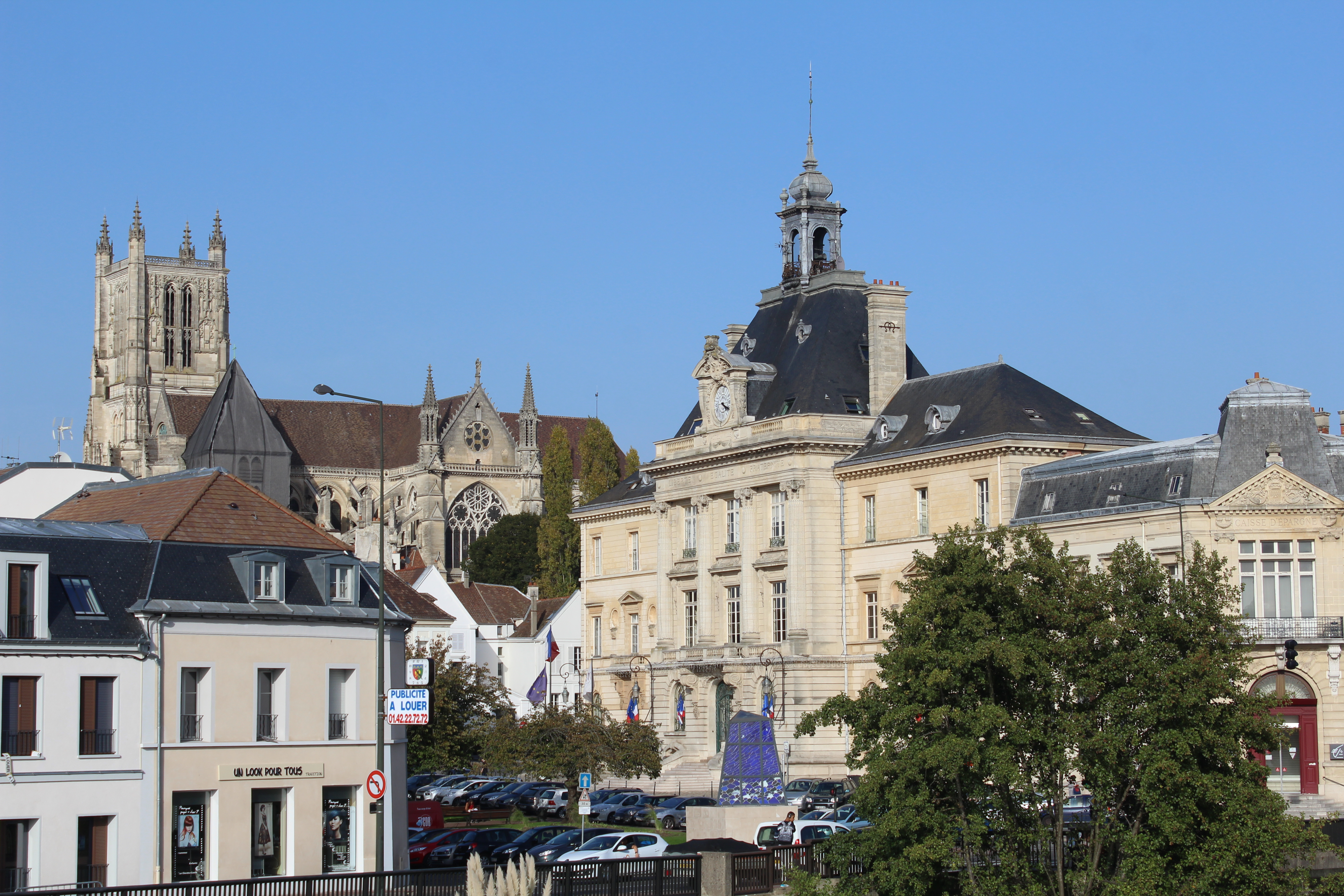
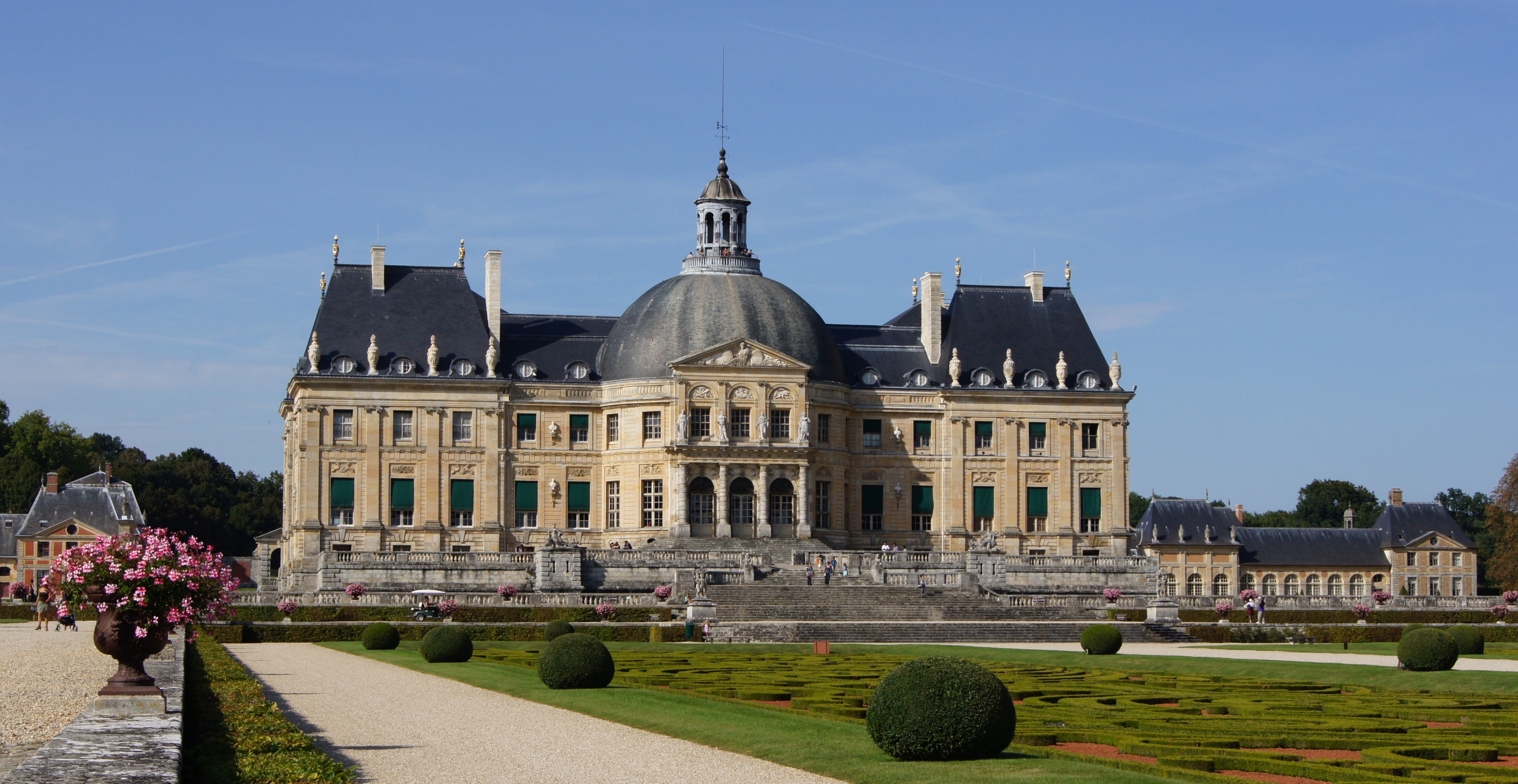
- Clockwise from top: Palace of Fontainebleau, city centre of Meaux, Vaux-le-Vicomte, Provins

- Flag Coat of arms

- Location of Seine-et-Marne in France
- Coordinates: 48°36′N 03°00′E
- Country: France
- Region: Île-de-France
- Prefecture: Melun
- Subprefectures: Fontainebleau; Meaux; Provins; Torcy

Government
  - President of the Departmental Council: Jean-François Parigi

Area^{1}
  - Total: 5,915 km^{2} (2,284 sq mi)

Population (2023)
  - Total: 1,468,108
  - Rank: 10th
  - Density: 248.2/km^{2} (642.8/sq mi)

GDP
  - Total: €42.983 billion (2021)
  - Per capita: €29,889 (2021)
- Time zone: UTC+1 (CET)
  - Summer (DST): UTC+2 (CEST)
- Department number: 77
- Arrondissements: 5
- Cantons: 23
- Communes: 507
- ^1 French Land Register data, which exclude estuaries and lakes, ponds and glaciers larger than 1 km^{2}

Seine-et-Marne (French pronunciation: [sɛn e maʁn]; lit. 'Seine and Marne') is a mainly rural department in the Île-de-France region in northern France. Named after the rivers Seine and Marne, it roughly encompasses the region's eastern half, and, at 5,915 km^{2} (2,284 sq mi), is by a wide margin the largest department in Île-de-France. In 2023, it had a population of 1,468,108. Its prefecture is Melun, although the communes both Meaux and Chelles have larger populations than that of Melun.

== History ==
Seine-et-Marne is one of the original 83 departments created on 4 March 1790 during the French Revolution in application of the law of 22 December 1789. It had previously belonged to the former province of Île-de-France. It is the only original departement in the Île-de-France that has remained unchanged, as both Seine and Seine-et-Oise were abolished and reorganised in 1968.

== Geography ==
=== Principal towns ===
The most populous commune is Meaux; the prefecture Melun is the third-most populous. As of 2023, there are 16 communes with more than 20,000 inhabitants. The 10 most populous communes are:

Commune	Population (2023)
Meaux	56,905
Chelles	54,620
Melun	45,995
Pontault-Combault	39,096
Savigny-le-Temple	31,148
Bussy-Saint-Georges	27,498
Champs-sur-Marne	27,451
Villeparisis	26,946
Dammarie-lès-Lys	23,559
Roissy-en-Brie	23,229

== Demographics ==
Historical population

Year	Pop.	±% p.a.
1801	299,160	—
1806	304,263	+0.34%
1831	323,881	+0.25%
1841	333,311	+0.29%
1851	345,076	+0.35%
1861	352,312	+0.21%
1872	341,490	−0.28%
1881	348,991	+0.24%
1891	356,747	+0.22%
1901	358,325	+0.04%
1911	363,561	+0.15%
1921	349,234	−0.40%
1931	406,108	+1.52%

Year	Pop.	±% p.a.
1936	409,311	+0.16%
1946	407,137	−0.05%
1954	453,438	+1.36%
1962	524,486	+1.84%
1968	604,340	+2.39%
1975	755,762	+3.25%
1982	887,112	+2.32%
1990	1,078,166	+2.47%
1999	1,193,767	+1.14%
2007	1,289,524	+0.97%
2012	1,353,946	+0.98%
2017	1,403,997	+0.73%
2023	1,468,108	+0.75%

Place of birth of residents of Seine-et-Marne in 1999
Born in metropolitan France	Born outside metropolitan France			
86.6%	13.4%			
86.6%	Born in overseas France	Born in foreign countries with French citizenship at birth^{1}	EU-15 immigrants^{2}	Non-EU-15 immigrants
86.6%	1.4%	2.3%	3.8%	5.9%
^{1} This group is made up largely of former French settlers, such as pieds-noirs in Northwest Africa, followed by former colonial citizens who had French citizenship at birth (such as was often the case for the native elite in French colonies), as well as to a lesser extent foreign-born children of French expatriates. A foreign country is understood as a country not part of France in 1999, so a person born for example in 1950 in Algeria, when Algeria was an integral part of France, is nonetheless listed as a person born in a foreign country in French statistics.^{2} An immigrant is a person born in a foreign country not having French citizenship at birth. An immigrant may have acquired French citizenship since moving to France, but is still considered an immigrant in French statistics. On the other hand, persons born in France with foreign citizenship (the children of immigrants) are not listed as immigrants.

=== Presidential elections (2nd round) results since 1995 ===
Election	Winning candidate	Party	%	2nd place candidate	Party	%
2022	Emmanuel Macron	LREM	56.98	Marine Le Pen	FN	43.02
2017	Emmanuel Macron	LREM	63.86	Marine Le Pen	FN	36.14
2012	Nicolas Sarkozy	UMP	50.75	François Hollande	PS	49.25
2007	Nicolas Sarkozy	UMP	56.25	Ségolène Royal	PS	43.75
2002	Jacques Chirac	RPR	80.64	Jean-Marie Le Pen	FN	19.36
1995	Jacques Chirac	RPR	55.07	Lionel Jospin	PS	44.93

=== Representation in Paris ===
==== National Assembly ====
In the National Assembly, Seine-et-Marne is represented by:

Constituency	Member	Party
Seine-et-Marne's 1st	Arnaud Saint-Martin	LFI
Seine-et-Marne's 2nd	Frédéric Valletoux	HOR
Seine-et-Marne's 3rd	Jean-Louis Thiériot	LR
Seine-et-Marne's 4th	Julien Limongi	RN
Seine-et-Marne's 5th	Franck Riester	RE
Seine-et-Marne's 6th	Béatrice Roullaud	RN
Seine-et-Marne's 7th	Ersilia Soudais	LFI
Seine-et-Marne's 8th	Arnaud Bonnet	LE
Seine-et-Marne's 9th	Céline Thiébault-Martinez	PS
Seine-et-Marne's 10th	Maxime Laisney	LFI
Seine-et-Marne's 11th	Olivier Faure	PS

==== Senate ====
In the Senate, Seine-et-Marne is represented by:

Senator	Party	Since
Anne-Chain Larché	LR	2015
Pierre Cuypers	LR	2016
Aymeric Durox	RN	2023
Vincent Éblé	PS	2011
Marianne Margaté	PCF	2023
Louis Vogel	HOR	2023

== Tourism ==
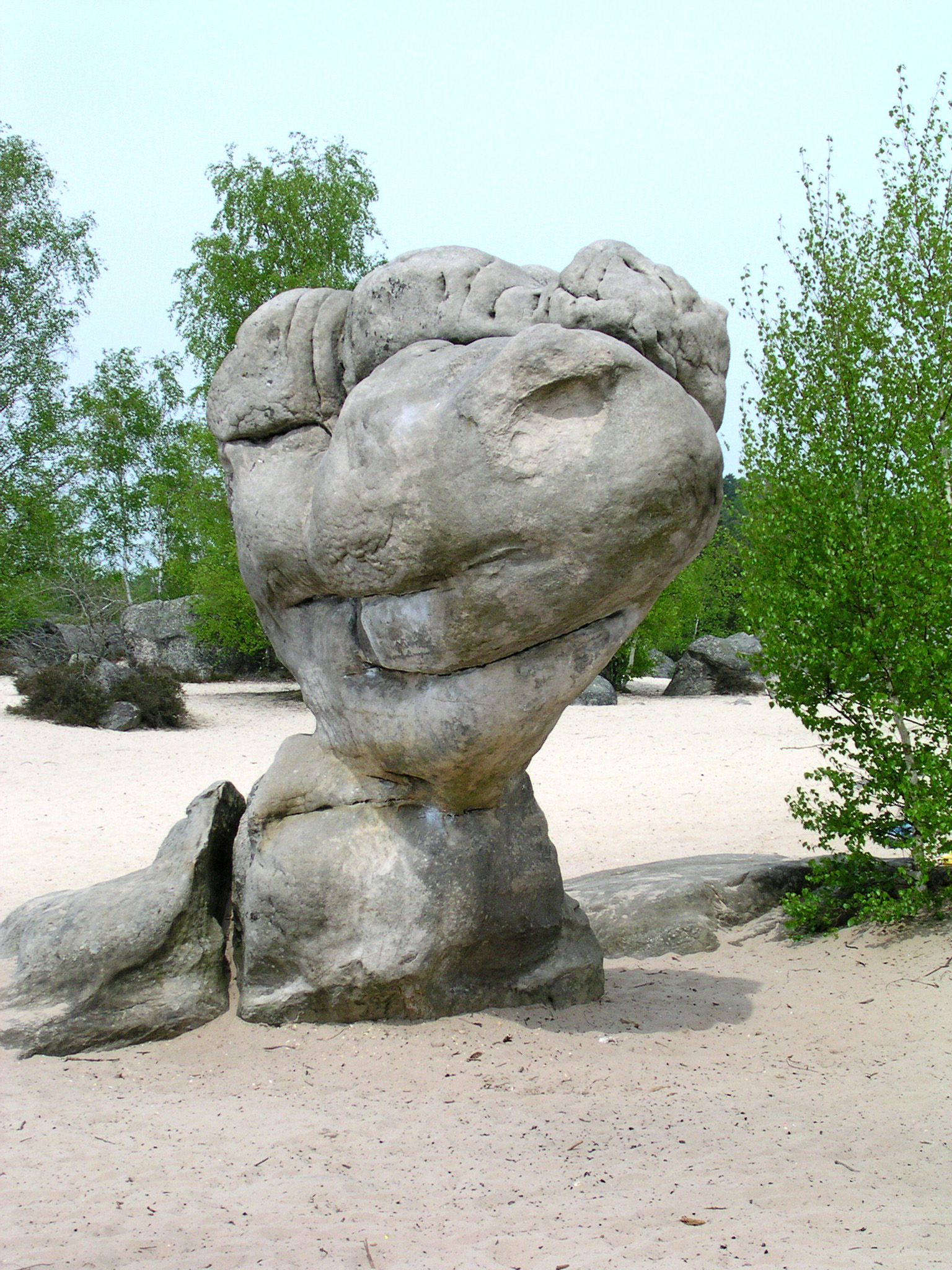
Bilboquet rock formation in the forest of Fontainebleau

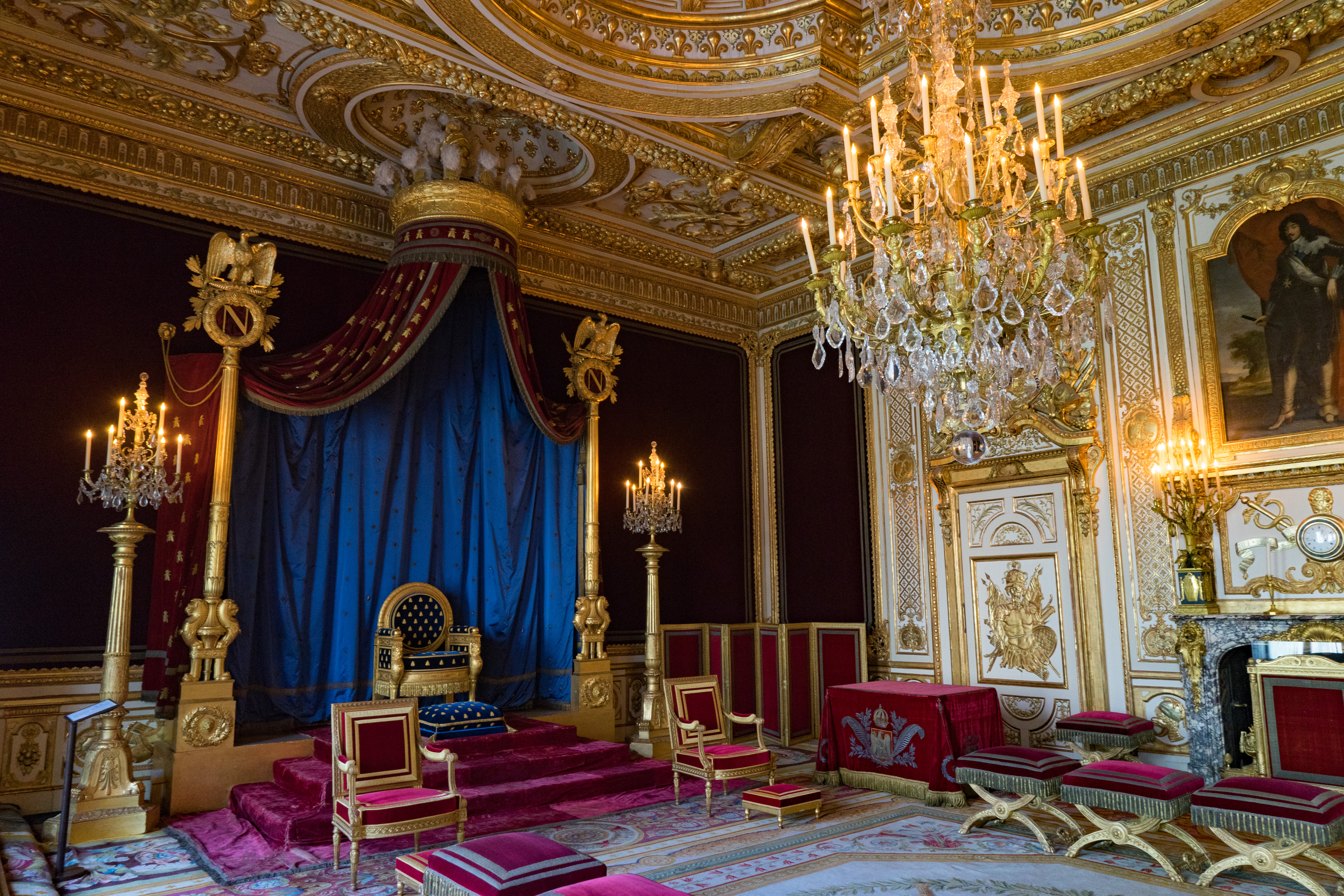
Throne Room in the Palace of Fontainebleau

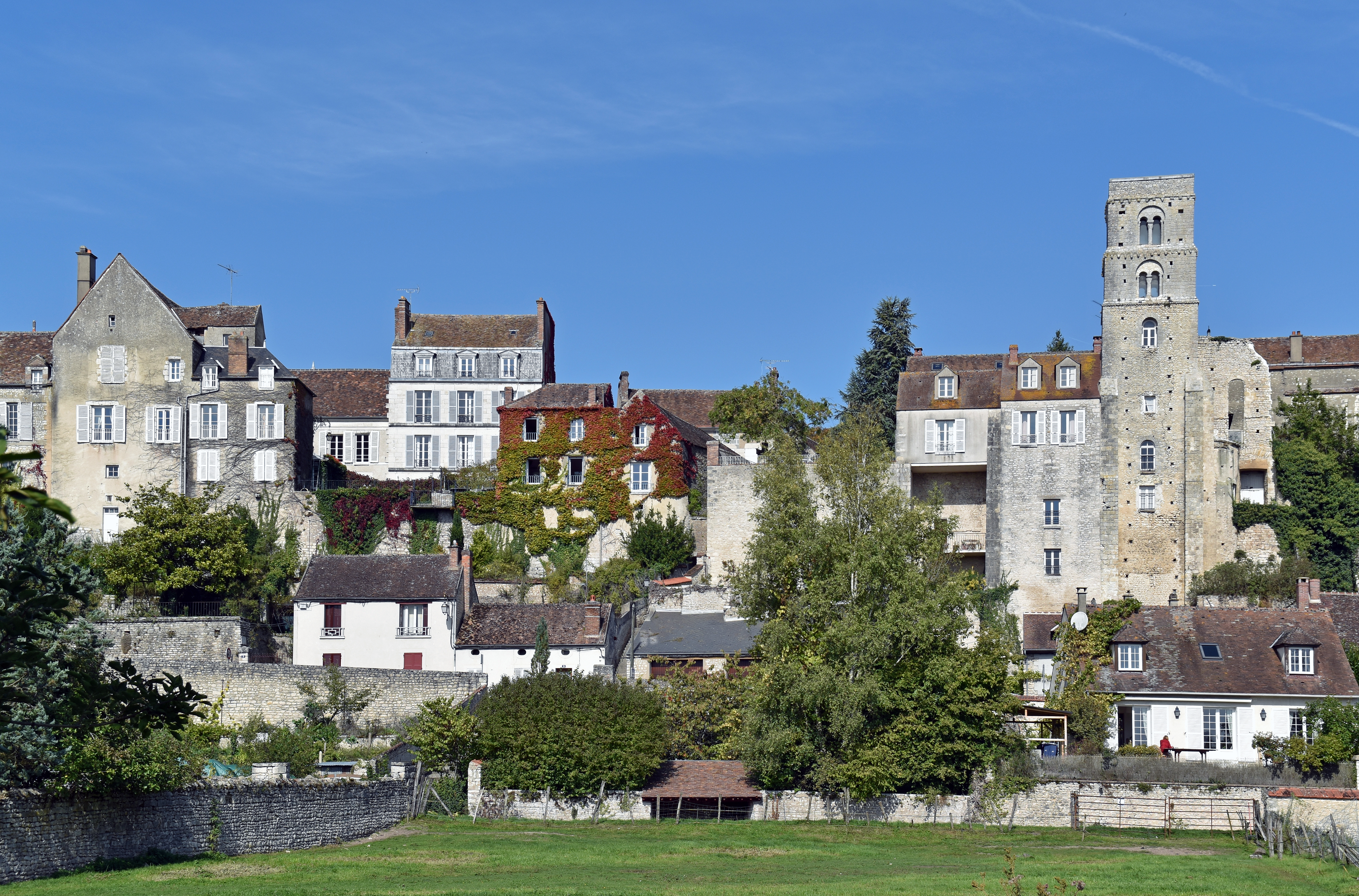
Château-Landon

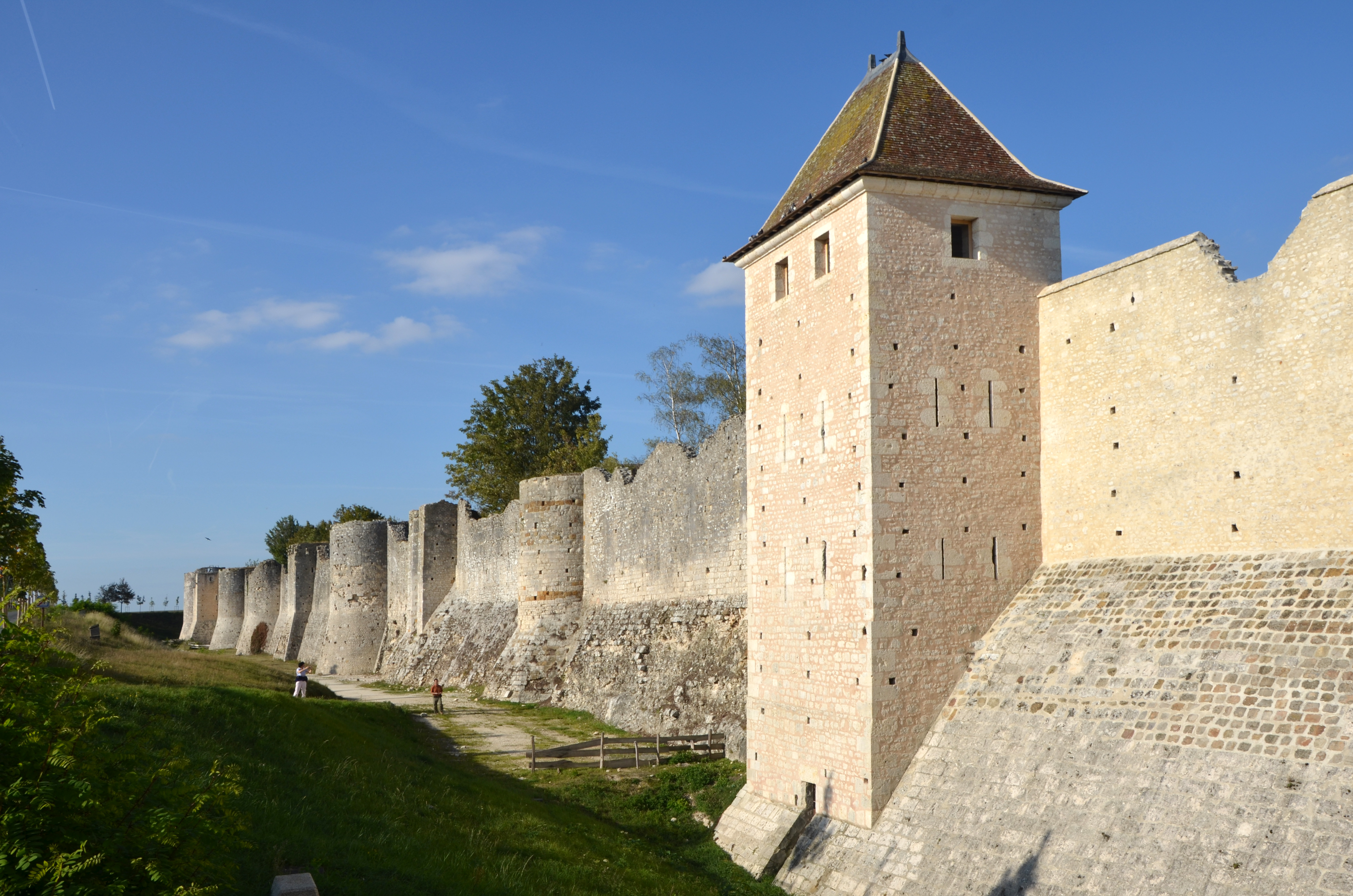
The walls of the medieval city of Provins

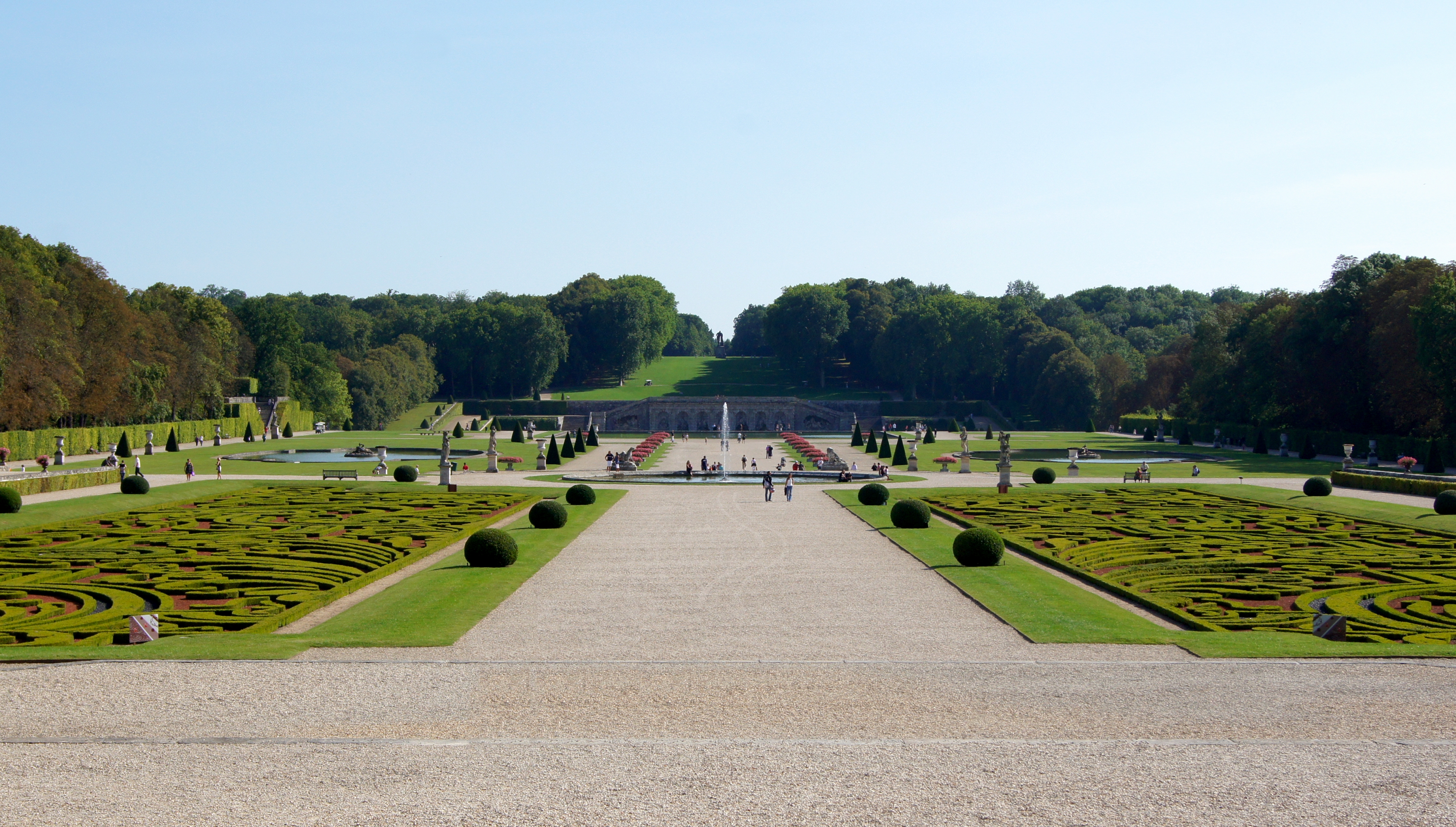
Gardens of Vaux-le-Vicomte

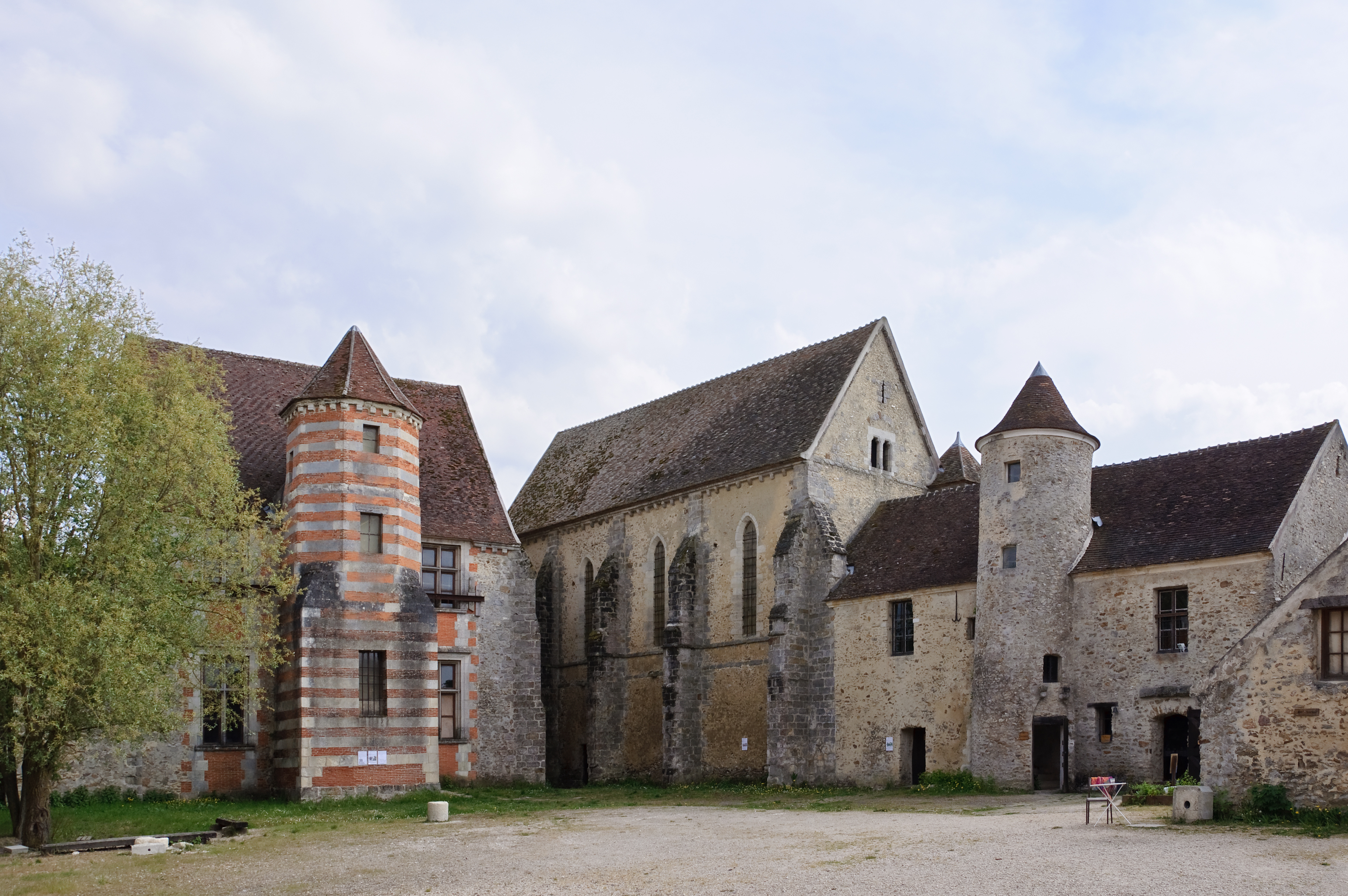
Knights Templar's commandry in Coulommiers

Disneyland Paris

== See also ==
- Cantons of the Seine-et-Marne department
- Communes of the Seine-et-Marne department
- Arrondissements of the Seine-et-Marne department
- Tramway from Verneuil-l'Étang to Melun
- Tramway from Sablonnières to Bray-sur-Seine

== Bibliography ==
- Lion, Christian, La Mutuelle de Seine-et-Marne contre l'incendie de 1819 à 1969. Mutualité, assurance et cycles de l'incendie (Bruxelles etc., Peter Lang, 2008).
