= Portrait of Philippe-Laurent de Joubert =

Painting by Jacques-Louis David

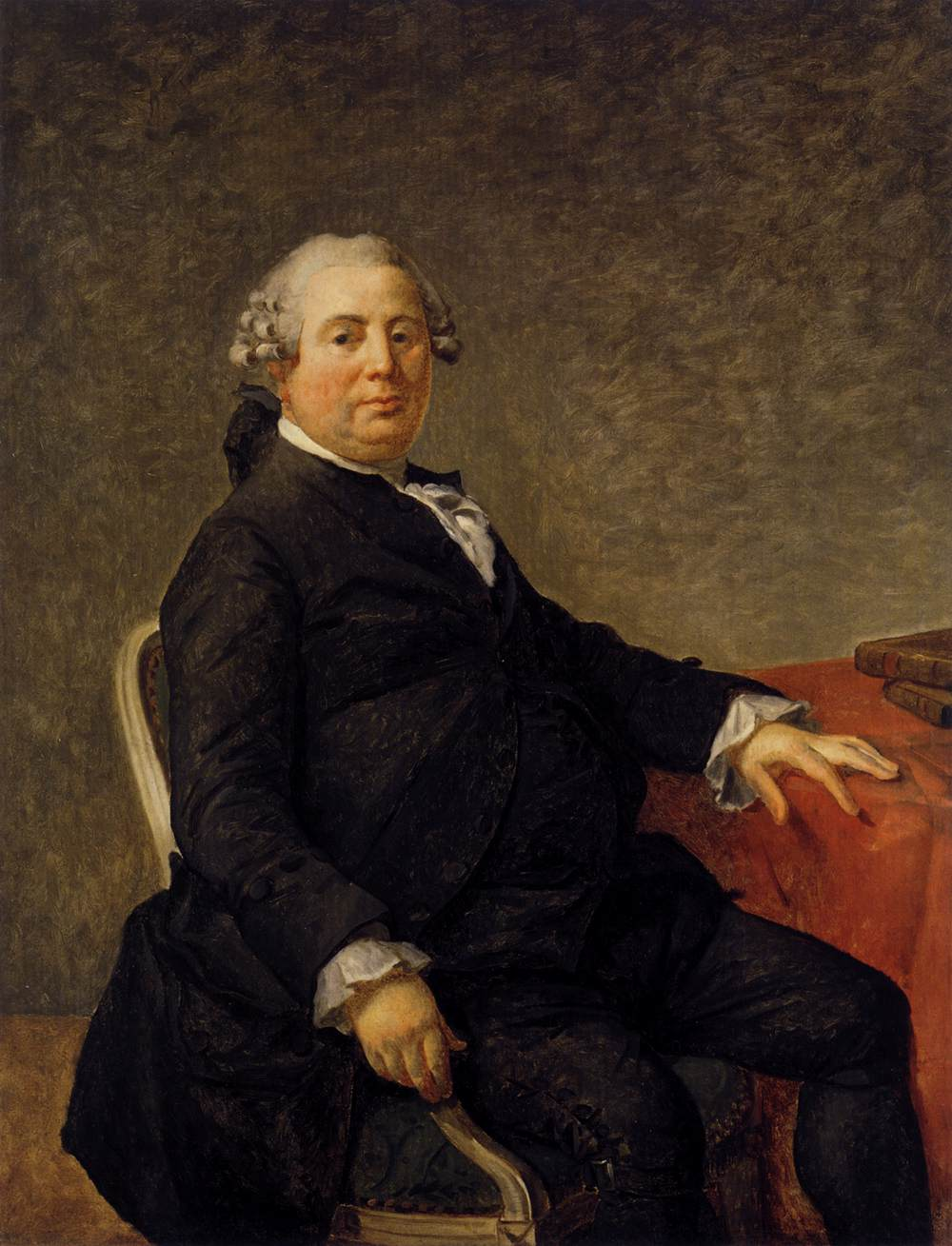
- Artist: Jacques-Louis David
- Year: c. 1790-1792
- Medium: oil on canvas
- Dimensions: 127 cm × 96 cm (50 in × 38 in)
- Location: Musée Fabre, Montpellier

Portrait of Philippe-Laurent de Joubert is an oil-on-canvas painting by the French artist Jacques-Louis David. Its date is unknown, but Antoine Schnapper argues that it was made between 1790 and 1792, since the subject died on 30 March 1792. It was left incomplete like his portraits of Madame Trudaine and Madame Pastoret. It is held in the Musée Fabre in Montpellier.

== See also ==
- List of paintings by Jacques-Louis David

== Bibliography ==
- (in French) Luc de Nanteuil, David, Paris, Cercle d'Art, coll. « les grands peintres », 1987 (ISBN 2-7022-0203-9)
- (in French) Antoine Schnapper (ed.) and Arlette Sérullaz, Jacques-Louis David 1748-1825 : catalogue de l'exposition rétrospective Louvre-Versailles 1989-1990, Paris, Réunion des Musées nationaux, 1989 (ISBN 2711823261)
