= 1900 Landes Sud Express disaster =

French railway disaster

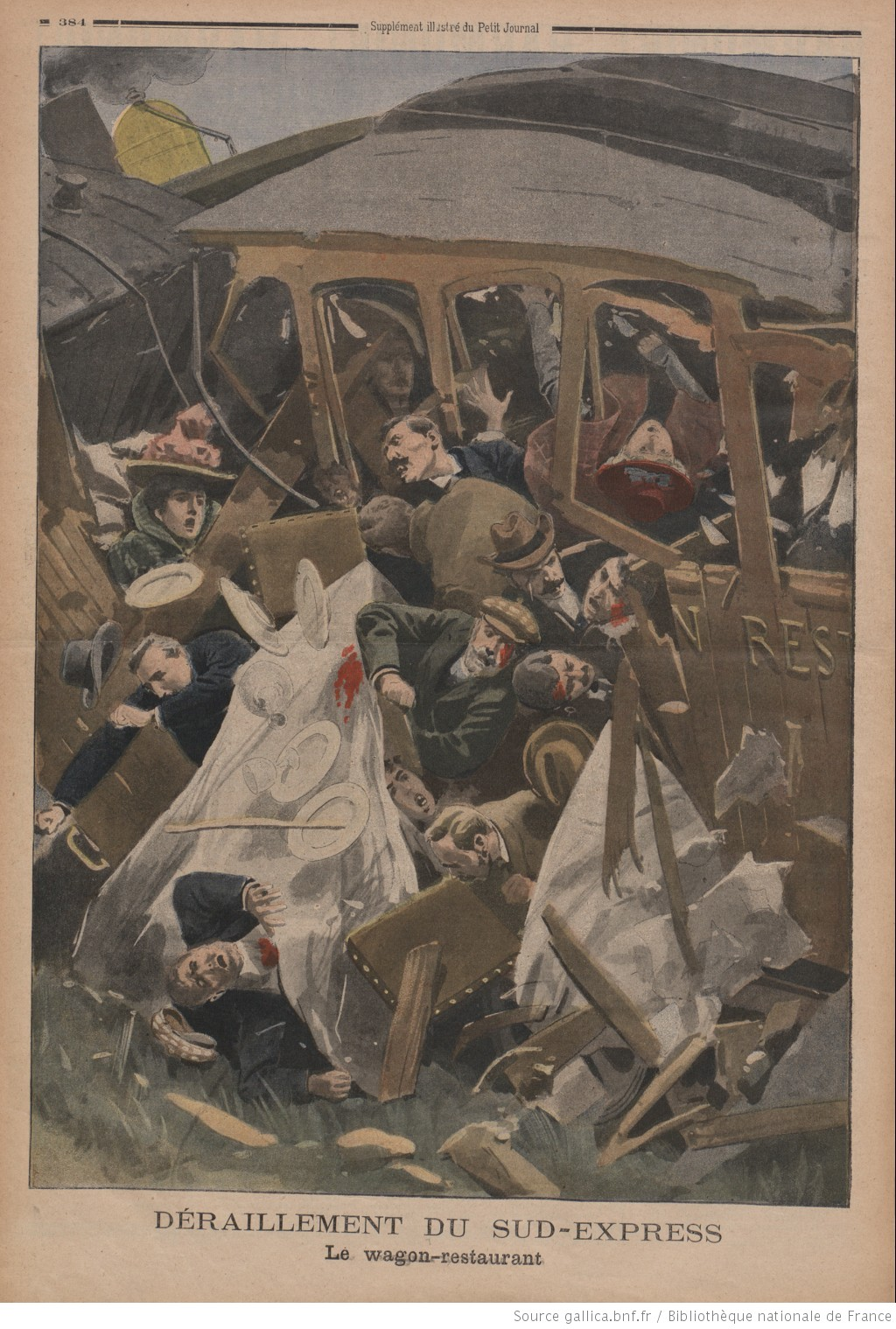
- The derailment as drawn by the illustrator of Le Petit Journal (issue of 2 December 1900)

Details
- Date: November 15, 1900; 125 years ago 11:46
- Location: Between Saint-Geours-de-Maremne station and Saubusse-les-Bains station, Landes
- Country: France
- Line: Midi network
- Operator: Chemins de fer du Midi
- Service: Sud Express
- Incident type: Derailment

Statistics
- Trains: 1
- Vehicles: 1 locomotive and 5 cars
- Passengers: 34
- Crew: 13
- Deaths: 14
- Injured: 20
- Damage: Locomotive, vans and dining car destroyed

The Sud Express passenger train derailed on 15 November 1900 on the Midi railway network in the Landes department, between the stations of Saint-Geours-de-Maremne station and Saubusse-les-Bains station. The prestigious nature of this luxury train, the high proportion of victims compared to the number of its occupants, and the notoriety of some of them gave the accident particular resonance.

== Disaster ==
In November 1900, the Sud Express, a train of the Compagnie Internationale des Wagons-Lits, provided a daily connection between Madrid and Paris with a transfer at the border. It left Madrid at 18:30 to arrive at Paris-Orsay the next day at 20:55.

On the morning of 15 November, at 10:00, its passengers, leaving their sleeping cars of Iberian gauge at Hendaye, took their places for the daytime journey in two lounge cars (numbers 1537 and 1552) complemented by a restaurant car (number 670), all framed by two luggage vans, one CIWL three-axle van at the head, the other a two-axle van of the Midi at the rear. Whereas in previous months the train’s occupancy had reached its maximum capacity of 80 passengers, it had fallen after the closure of the World’s Fair of 1900 on 12 November, and only 34 passengers occupied it that day. They represented the usual clientele of luxury trains: diplomats, merchants, industrialists, and rentiers of all nationalities, along with members of their families and staff. They were joined by nine CIWL employees and four railway workers of the Midi, bringing the total number of occupants to 47. The train was hauled by a compound express locomotive of the 220 type, known as Outrance, of the 1750 series, no. 1756, belonging to the Midi network, driven by the driver Boussié and fireman Hieret, from the Bordeaux depot.

At 11:46, as it entered a large-radius curve with a gradient of 5‰, about thirty kilometers before Dax, between the stations of Saint-Geours-de-Maremne station and Saubusse-les-Bains station, at PK 165.5, the engine left the tracks, ran about 100 meters on the ballast, then toppled onto the slightly lower embankment, in which it sank. The leading van and the dining car followed and were crushed against the tender, while the two salon cars and the rear van derailed but remained on the track.

== Rescue ==
The chimney of the runaway locomotive had torn down the telegraph wire providing the connection with Dax, the nearest town, and news of the accident only reached there at 15:30. The first relief train therefore departed from Bayonne, carrying, among others, requisitioned doctors. According to one passenger, company employees did not arrive on the scene until two hours later. In the meantime, local peasants had freed the most accessible injured, transporting them to a nearby farm where they were given basic treatment, and where one of them died.

Although the Minister of Commerce immediately ordered that the scene not be altered before the investigations into the causes of the accident, efforts were made to restore traffic as quickly as possible, and trains could resume circulation around 18:00 the same day on a temporary track.

Pending the clearing of the wreckage, a guard was established around the remains to prevent looting of debris, in which valuables belonging to passengers had remained. Thus, the jewelry case of the Duchess of Canevaro was recovered three days later. Since some property had nevertheless disappeared, in order to recover it the public prosecutor in Dax opened a judicial investigation one month later, which allowed the gendarmerie to recover a bundle of banknotes worth seven hundred francs.

== Casualties ==
The fireman and the driver, thrown into a field and covered by the coal ejected in the final impact of the locomotive’s wild course, suffered only multiple but minor contusions. The same was true for the four passengers who had remained in the salon cars and the two Midi railwaymen, the brakeman and the train conductor, who were in the rear van.

The most serious destruction caused by the derailment affected the leading van and the dining car, in which thirty of the train’s thirty-four passengers were seated for the second lunch service. It was from this car that most of the victims were extracted, including the fourteen dead and the sixteen most seriously injured out of the twenty total wounded.

All the employees of the CIWL were affected to varying degrees. Of the seven present in the dining car, one maître d’hôtel was killed, while his colleagues, along with the head chef, his assistants, and the dishwasher, were more or less seriously injured. The press widely reported that one maître d’hôtel, suffering only light injuries but struck by madness from the shock, wandered the scene of the disaster singing at the top of his voice. The baggage handler and the conductor on duty in the leading van were also injured.

The extent of commentary and commemorations devoted to the passengers killed in the disaster varied according to their notoriety. Thus, particular attention in the press was given to the deaths of Madame Bernain and her son André, members of a notable family of the southwest; two Belgians, respectively director and administrator of the Société générale des chemins de fer économiques; and the wife of Mr. Joseph Dombrowski, a Russian engineer of international renown.

The most important place was reserved for José Francisco Canevaro, Duke of Zoagli, a Peruvian diplomat and statesman, minister plenipotentiary of Peru in Rome, Madrid, Paris, and London, brother of the Italian admiral and politician Felice Napoleone Canevaro and of the Peruvian general and statesman César Canevaro Valega. He died with his twenty-four-year-old nephew, Mr. Elster, also attached to the Peruvian delegation. The government decided that, given the circumstances of his death, the cost of his funeral would be borne by the French state and immediately submitted a draft law to this effect. The ceremony took place in the presence of the diplomatic corps and the ministers of Foreign Affairs and Public Works at the Church of La Madeleine on 23 November, followed by burial in the family vault in Italy.

The fate of Joseph de Goyeneche, who escaped the accident unscathed, also attracted special attention due to his belonging to an illustrious family of the Spanish nobility.

== Investigation of causes ==
Since the accident occurred the day before the debate in the Chamber of Deputies on an interpellation concerning a previous railway disaster at Choisy-le-Roi, a new request for interpellation was added to the discussion, which concluded with a motion “deploring the catastrophe of Choisy-le-Roi and that of Dax” and expressing wishes intended to prevent further accidents.

As whenever a railway accident caused injury or death, the search for causes gave rise to three parallel investigations. A criminal investigation into possible prosecution for homicide or injury was opened by the Public Prosecutor of Pau, whose Attorney General appointed two experts, MM. Mussat and Cadart, engineers of bridges and roads. An administrative inquiry was conducted by Jules Lax, Inspector General of the State Control Service, at the request of the Minister of Commerce, Pierre Baudin. Finally, the Compagnie du Midi carried out its own investigation under the responsibility of its deputy director, Georges Glasser, immediately sent to the site, later joined by its director, Ernest Blagé.

Although the various experts expressed contradictory hypotheses about the causes of the accident, until they delivered their conclusions, the common opinion seemed to be that it was due to a track failure when the express passed.

=== Condition of the track ===
For several days, torrential rains had struck the region, causing the nearby Adour to overflow. It was therefore plausible that, waterlogged, the trackbed, composed at that location of a bank of superimposed clay layers, had subsided under the train’s passage. Shortly after the accident, the directors of the Midi and Wagons-Lits companies themselves appeared to favor this hypothesis, supported by the testimony of the driving crew, who reported feeling the ground give way beneath the locomotive.

The press widely echoed this explanation, and since the driver Boussié, who had operated the same express the two previous days, claimed to have already reported the poor condition of the track in writing on his traction bulletin upon returning to the depot, criticism of the company’s culpable negligence increased. The newspaper Le Matin even went so far as to headline its front page with “the murders of the Sud-Express”, while in an editorial of L'Intransigeant of 19 November, Henri Rochefort denounced collusion between Minister Baudin and the Orleans company, “all-powerful, being composed of administrators two-thirds of whom are Jews.”

For its defense, the company argued that the driver was not accustomed to handling the Sud-Express, and that although he had indeed reported anomalies, it was not at the location of the accident, where in fact a train had passed without difficulty twenty minutes earlier.

=== Speed of the train ===
At the time, the Sud-Express was presented as the fastest train in the world over its 825 km French route, with an average commercial speed of 87 km/h between Paris and Bayonne, achieved thanks to a reduced composition limiting its weight to 215 tonnes and to high line speeds.

Locomotive no. 1756 was not yet equipped with a Flaman speed recorder, but it may be presumed, from passenger and driver testimony, that taking advantage of the slope it had reached its maximum speed at the time of the accident, probably close to 120 km/h, its mass of 90 tonnes (including tender) shaking the track weakened by the rains.

Aware that the train’s speed, otherwise widely used in its promotion, might in this case be incriminated, the companies’ representatives tended to distance themselves from it in their statements. Thus, the secretary of the Midi’s management admitted that the thirty minutes allocated for the fifty kilometers between Bayonne and Dax required a speed of over 100 km/h, but maintained that the responsibility lay with the State, which had approved schedules obliging trains to run at that pace.

The Secretary-General of the CIWL, meanwhile, attributed the fault solely to the railway networks, here the Midi, denouncing what he called the “madness of speed”, even claiming it generated discomfort and accidents.

=== Fortuitous cause ===
Henri Rochefort had concluded his editorial in L’Intransigeant by predicting that the company would be cleared of all responsibility for the disaster. This is indeed what happened.

One could already sense this nine days after the accident, when the head of the administrative inquiry, M. Lax, Inspector of State Control for the Midi network, made statements dismissing all criticism of the track condition and discrediting the driver’s testimony, instead blaming the derailment of the locomotive and tender on the excessive lightness of the leading van that followed them. Indeed, in an article “The accident to the Sud-Express” published in the British journal The Engineer, the English railway specialist Charles Rous-Marten pointed to the poor high-speed running of CIWL coaches. However, he nonetheless favored as the sole cause of the accident the degradation of the trackbed due to rain.

Two months later, in their report to the Public Prosecutor, the judicial experts, aligning with the administrative inquiry, declared the track condition impeccable and also attributed the derailment to the van, which they said had left the rails after the Saint-Geours curve either because of its lightness or by running over a hard object fallen on the track. Since the vehicle’s weight, even if insufficient, conformed to regulatory requirements, and the possible presence of an obstacle on the track constituted a fortuitous case, the accident did not reveal any fault likely to give rise to criminal responsibility.

Nevertheless, the victims and their families were entitled to compensation under the companies’ civil liability. Most accepted the amicable settlements offered, but Mr. Dumbrowski, judging them insufficient, brought suit on his own behalf and on behalf of his minor children before the civil court of Dax, which on 21 July 1901 ordered the Midi company to pay him 290,000 francs in damages.

The only member of staff to contest his workers’ compensation settlement, the driver Boussié, left disabled by the derailment, obtained from the Pau Court of Appeal a re-evaluation of the life annuity owed by the company. However, he failed to have its “inexcusable fault” recognized, the judges relying on the “patient and laborious investigations” of the experts to exonerate it.
