= List of senators of Seine-et-Marne =

Location of Seine-et-Marne in France

Following is a list of senators of Seine-et-Marne, people who have represented the department of Seine-et-Marne in the Senate of France.

== Third Republic ==
Senators for Seine-et-Marne under the French Third Republic were:

- Gabriel Adam (1876–1885)
- Louis-Alexandre Foucher de Careil (1876–1891)
- François Dufraigne (1885–1891)
- Louis Benoist (1891–1896)
- Jacques Regismanset (1891–1900 and (1903–1923)
- Charles Prévet (1894–1909)
- Jules Bastide (1896–1900)
- Eugène Thomas (1900–1903)
- Edmond Forgemol de Bostquenard (1900–1909)
- François Farny (1909–1919)
- Gaston Menier (1909–1934)
- Eugène Penancier (1920–1936)
- Jules Lugol (1924–1936)
- Jacques-Louis Dumesnil (1935–1940)
- René Courtier (1936–1940)
- Albert Ouvré (1936–1940)

== Fourth Republic ==
Senators for Seine-et-Marne under the French Fourth Republic were:

- Adolphe Legeay (1946-1948
- Hubert Pajot (1946-1958)
- André Bataille (1948-1959)
- Charles Chalamon (1948-1952)
- André Boutemy (1952-1959)
- Pierre Brun (1958-1959) - Reelected in 5th Republic

== Fifth Republic ==
Senators for Seine-et-Marne under the French Fifth Republic:

In office	Name	Group	Notes
1959	André Boutemy	Centre Républicain d'Action Rurale et Sociale	Died in office 14 July 1959
1959–1995	Étienne Dailly	Rassemblement Démocratique et Européen	Resigned 3 March 1995 (named to Constitutional Council)
1959–1977	Maurice Lalloy	Rassemblement pour la République	
1959–1968	Paul Lévêque	Républicains et Indépendants	From 16 July 1959 in place of André Boutemy
1968–1976	Pierre Brun	Rassemblement pour la République	Died in office 2 March 1976
1976–1977	Guy Millot	none	From 3 March 1976 in place of Pierre Brun
1977–1992	Paul Séramy	Union Centriste	Died in office 23 February 1992
1977–1983	Marc Jacquet	Rassemblement pour la République	Died in office 18 April 1983
1977–2004	Jacques Larché	Union pour un Mouvement Populaire	
1983–2004	Philippe François	Union pour un Mouvement Populaire	From 19 April 1983 in place of Marc Jacquet
1992–1995	Robert Piat	Union Centriste	From 24 February 1992 in place of Paul Séramy
1995	Charles Pelletier	Rassemblement Démocratique et Européen	From 4 March 1995 in place of Étienne Dailly
1995–1999	Alain Peyrefitte	Rassemblement pour la République	Died in office 27 November 1999
1995–2015	Jean-Jacques Hyest	Les Républicains	Resigned 11 October 2015 (named to Constitutional Council)
1999–2004	Paul Dubrule	Union pour un Mouvement Populaire	From 28 November 1999 in place of Alain Peyrefitte
2004–2011	Yannick Bodin	Socialiste	
2004–2016	Michel Houel	Les Républicains	Died in office 30 November 2016
2004–2017	Michel Billout	Communiste républicain et citoyen	
2004–present	Colette Mélot	Les Indépendants – République et Territoires	
2004–2012	Nicole Bricq	La République En Marche	Resigned 16 June 2012 (named to cabinet)
2011–present	Vincent Eblé	Socialiste et républicain	
2012–2014	Hélène Lipietz	none	Replaced Nicole Bricq 17 June 2012; Left office 2 May 2014 when Nicole Bricq returned
2014–2017	Nicole Bricq	La République En Marche	Returned from cabinet to senate 3 May 2014; Died in office 6 August 2017
2017	Hélène Lipietz	none	Replaced Nicole Bricq 7 August 2017
2015–present	Anne Chain-Larché	Les Républicains	Replaced Jean-Jacques Hyest 12 October 2015
2016–present	Pierre Cuypers	Les Républicains	Replaced Michel Houel 1 December 2016
2017–present	Arnaud de Belenet	La République En Marche	
2017–present	Claudine Thomas	Les Républicains	

== Sources ==
- Liste des anciens sénateurs de la IIIème République par circonscription (in French), Sénat de France
- Liste des anciens sénateurs de la IVème République par circonscription (in French), Sénat de France
- Liste des anciens sénateurs de la Vème République par circonscription (in French), Sénat de France
- Liste par département – Seine-et-Marne (in French), Sénat de France
