= Portrait of Madame Pastoret =

Painting by Jacques-Louis David

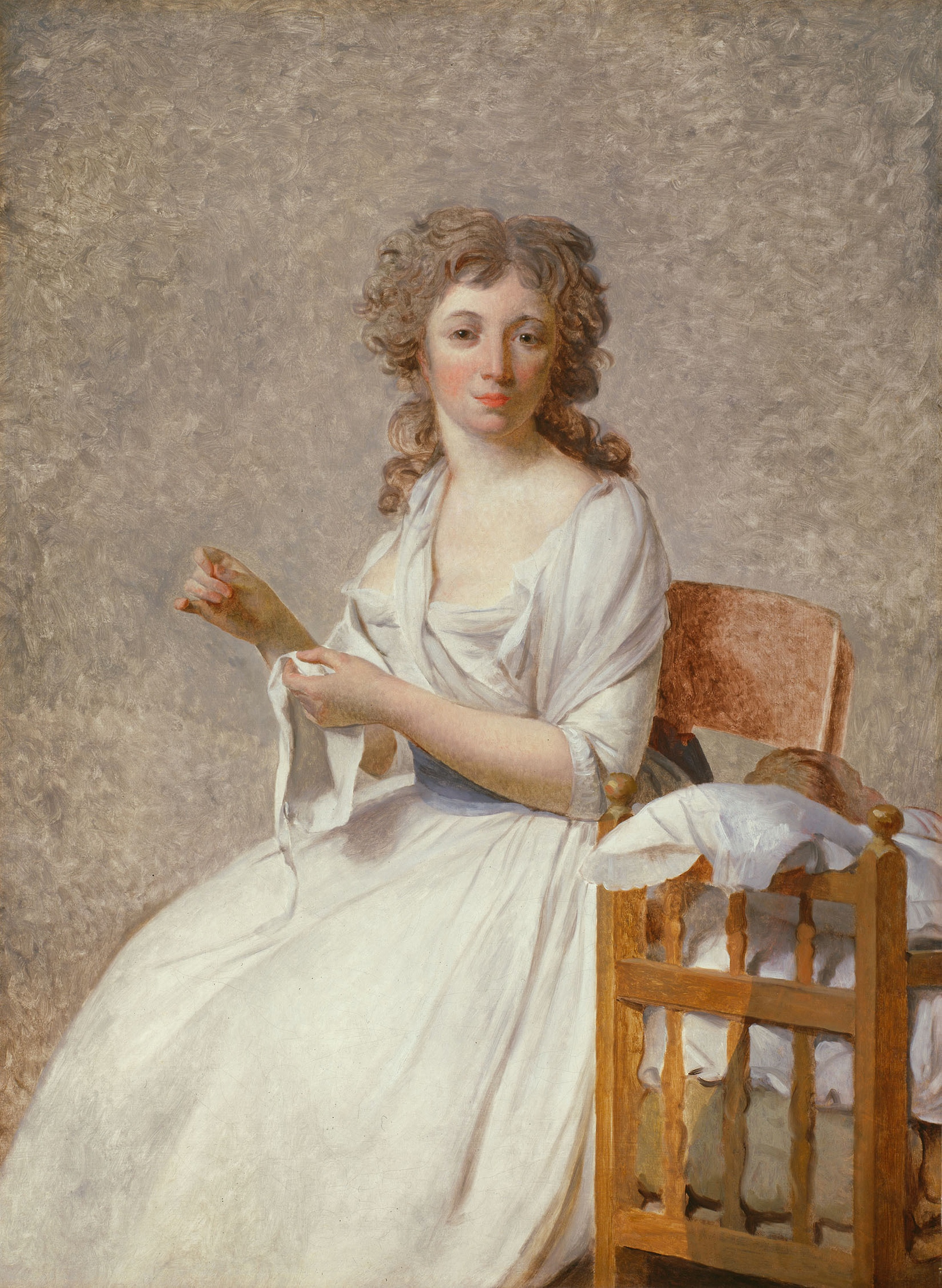
- Artist: Jacques-Louis David
- Year: 1791–1792
- Medium: oil on canvas
- Dimensions: 128 cm × 85 cm (50 in × 33 in)
- Location: Art Institute of Chicago

Portrait of Madame Pastoret is a 1791 oil-on-canvas portrait by the French Neoclassical artist Jacques-Louis David. It depicts Adélaide Pastoret, née Piscatory de Vaufreland (1765–1843). David was a friend of the Pastoret family but broke with them in 1792 after he became more politically radical. With his portraits of Philippe-Laurent de Joubert and Madame Trudaine, it was one of three paintings left incomplete because of the advance of the French Revolution – all three figures were arrested or emigrated. An infant's head is also shown in the cot – this is Amédée de Pastoret, a future conseiller d'Etat, painted by Ingres in 1826.

Madame Pastoret is from the upper class but is painted here without any finery, as befitted the period, when any display of wealth would have been viewed with suspicion. She is instead depicted as a housewife and mother, emphasizing her homely virtues. That the picture is unfinished is shown by the blotchy background created with short brush strokes, and by the fact that the sewing needle in Madame Pastoret's hand is missing.

The painting was still in David's studio at the time of his death, when it was sold for 400 francs to its subject and remained in her family until the 1890 death without issue of her granddaughter, the marquise de Rougé du Plessis-Bellière, née Marie de Pastoret. It was catalogued as on show to the public in her collection at her château in Moreuil in 1884. A visitor described it in 1890. Her collections were auctioned in May 1897, with the portrait sold for 17900 francs as lot 21 to M. Cheramy. It has been in the Art Institute of Chicago since 1967.

== See also ==
- List of paintings by Jacques-Louis David
