= South African Class 10C 4-6-2 =

1910 design of steam locomotive

CSAR Class 10-C 4-6-2 South African Class 10C & 10CR 4-6-2
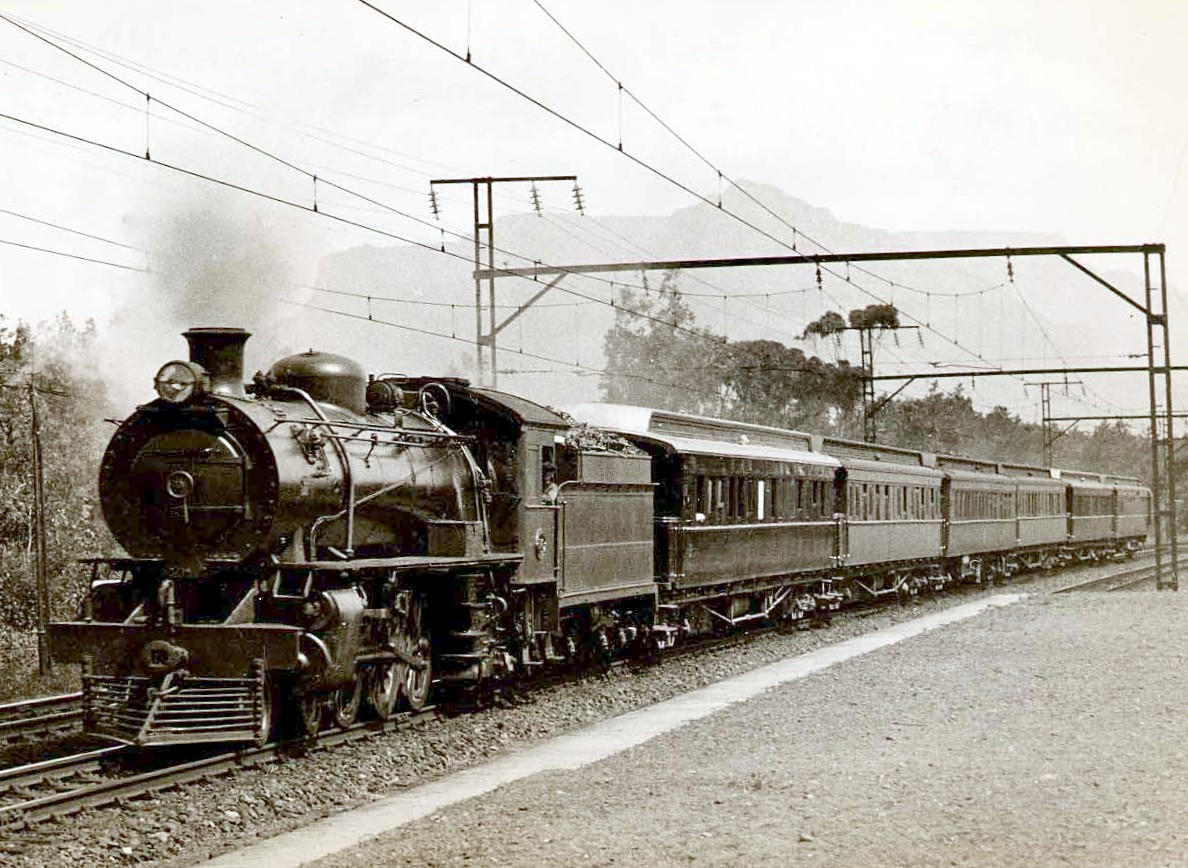
- Class 10CR no. 778 passing Woltemade No. 4, near present-day Thornton, c. 1940
Type and origin
- ♠ Class 10C as built with a Belpaire firebox ♥ Class 10C, superheated ♣ Class 10CR rebuilt with a Watson Standard boiler ʘ Type XC tender – ʘ Type XM2 tender
- Power type: Steam
- Designer: Central South African Railways (G.G. Elliot)
- Builder: North British Locomotive Company
- Serial number: 19195-19206
- Model: CSAR Class 10-C
- Build date: 1910
- Total produced: 12
Specifications
- Configuration
  - Whyte: 4-6-2 (Pacific)
  - UIC: ♠ 2'C1'n2 – ♥ 2'C1'h2
- Driver: 2nd coupled axle
- Gauge: 3 ft 6 in (1,067 mm) Cape gauge
- Leading dia.: 28 1/2 in (724 mm)
- Coupled dia.: 57 in (1,448 mm)
- Trailing dia.: 33 in (838 mm)
- Tender wheels: ʘʘ 33 1/2 in (851 mm) as built ʘʘ 34 in (864 mm) retyred
- Wheelbase: 52 ft 4 1/2 in (15,964 mm)
  - Engine: 28 ft 7 1/2 in (8,725 mm)
  - Leading: 6 ft (1,829 mm)
  - Coupled: 10 ft (3,048 mm)
  - Tender: ʘ 14 ft 7 in (4,445 mm) ʘ 16 ft 9 in (5,105 mm)
  - Tender bogie: ʘʘ 4 ft 7 in (1,397 mm)
- Length
  - Over couplers: ʘ 59 ft 3/4 in (18,002 mm) ʘ 62 ft 9 in (19,126 mm)
- Height: ♠♥ 12 ft 10 in (3,912 mm) ♣ 12 ft 11 in (3,937 mm)
- Axle load: ♠ 14 LT (14,220 kg) ♥ 14 LT 14 cwt (14,940 kg) ♣ 15 LT 6 cwt (15,550 kg)
  - Leading: ♠ 11 LT 11 cwt (11,740 kg) ♥ 13 LT 12 cwt (13,820 kg) ♣ 15 LT 6 cwt (15,550 kg)
  - Coupled: ♠ 14 LT (14,220 kg)
  - 1st coupled: ♥ 13 LT 19 cwt (14,170 kg) ♣ 14 LT 14 cwt (14,940 kg)
  - 2nd coupled: ♥ 14 LT 14 cwt (14,940 kg) ♣ 15 LT 6 cwt (15,550 kg)
  - 3rd coupled: ♥ 14 LT 2 cwt (14,330 kg) ♣ 14 LT 14 cwt (14,940 kg)
  - Trailing: ♠ 11 LT 4 cwt (11,380 kg) ♥ 11 LT 15 cwt (11,940 kg) ♣ 12 LT 6 cwt (12,500 kg)
  - Tender bogie: Bogie 1: ʘ 17 LT (17,270 kg) ʘ 24 LT 4 cwt (24,590 kg); Bogie 2: ʘ 17 LT 16 cwt (18,090 kg) ʘ 25 LT 3 cwt (25,550 kg)
  - Tender axle: ʘ 8 LT 18 cwt (9,043 kg) ʘ 12 LT 11 cwt 2 qtr (12,780 kg)
- Adhesive weight: ♠ 42 LT (42,670 kg) ♥ 42 LT 15 cwt (43,440 kg) ♣ 44 LT 14 cwt (45,420 kg)
- Loco weight: ♠ 64 LT 15 cwt (65,790 kg) ♥ 68 LT 2 cwt (69,190 kg) ♣ 72 LT 6 cwt (73,460 kg)
- Tender weight: ʘ 34 LT 16 cwt (35,360 kg) ʘ 49 LT 7 cwt (50,140 kg)
- Total weight: ♠ʘ 99 LT 11 cwt (101,100 kg) ♠ʘ 114 LT 2 cwt (115,900 kg) ♥ʘ 102 LT 18 cwt (104,600 kg) ♥ʘ 117 LT 9 cwt (119,300 kg) ♣ʘ 121 LT 13 cwt (123,600 kg)
- Tender type: XC (2-axle bogies); XM2 (2-axle bogies); XC, XC1, XD, XE, XE1, XF, XF1, XF2, XJ, XM, XM1, XM2, XM3, XM4, XP1, XS permitted
- Fuel type: Coal
- Fuel capacity: ʘ 5 LT (5.1 t) ʘ 10 LT (10.2 t)
- Water cap.: ʘ 2,600 imp gal (11,800 L) ʘ 4,000 imp gal (18,200 L)
- Generator: Pyle National turbo-generator
- Firebox
  - Type: ♠ Belpaire – ♣ Round-top
  - Grate area: ♠♥ 32 sq ft (3.0 m^{2}) ♣ 36 sq ft (3.3 m^{2})
- Boiler
  - Model: ♣ Watson Standard no. 1
  - Pitch: ♠♥ 7 ft 4 in (2,235 mm) ♣ 8 ft (2,438 mm)
  - Diameter: ♠♥ 4 ft 8 1/4 in (1,429 mm) ♣ 5 ft (1,524 mm)
  - Tube plates: ♠♥ 16 ft 6 1/2 in (5,042 mm) ♣ 17 ft 9 in (5,410 mm)
  - Small tubes: ♠ 183: 2 1/4 in (57 mm) ♥ 100: 2 1/4 in (57 mm) ♣ 76 2 1/2 in (64 mm)
  - Large tubes: ♥ 18: 5 1/2 in (140 mm) ♣ 24: 5 1/2 in (140 mm)
- Boiler pressure: ♠♥♣ 200 psi (1,379 kPa)
- Safety valve: ♠♥ Ramsbottom ♣ Pop
- Heating surface
  - Firebox: ♠♥ 122 sq ft (11.3 m^{2}) ♣ 123 sq ft (11.4 m^{2})
  - Tubes: ♠ 1,783 sq ft (165.6 m^{2}) ♥ 1,403 sq ft (130.3 m^{2}) ♣ 1,497 sq ft (139.1 m^{2})
  - Total surface: ♠ 1,905 sq ft (177.0 m^{2}) ♥ 1,525 sq ft (141.7 m^{2}) ♣ 1,620 sq ft (151 m^{2})
- Superheater
  - Heating area: ♥ 345 sq ft (32.1 m^{2}) ♣ 366 sq ft (34.0 m^{2})
- Cylinders: Two
- Cylinder size: ♠♥♣ 18 in (457 mm) bore ♠♥♣ 26 in (660 mm) stroke
- Valve gear: Walschaerts
- Valve type: Piston
- Couplers: Johnston link-and-pin AAR knuckle (1930s)
Performance figures
- Tractive effort: ♠♥♣ 22,170 lbf (98.6 kN) @ 75%
Career
- Operators: Central South African Railways; South African Railways
- Class: CSAR Class 10-C, SAR Class 10C
- Number in class: 12
- Numbers: CSAR 1003-1014, SAR 767-778
- Delivered: 1910–1911
- First run: 1910
- Withdrawn: 1973

The South African Railways Class 10C 4-6-2 of 1910 was a steam locomotive from the pre-Union era in Transvaal.

In 1910, the Central South African Railways placed twelve Class 10-C 4-6-2 Pacific type steam locomotives in service. In 1912, these locomotives were renumbered and designated Class 10C on the South African Railways roster.

== Manufacturer ==
In November and December 1910, twelve light 4-6-2 Pacific type passenger locomotives were placed in service by the Central South African Railways (CSAR). Designed by G.G. Elliot, Chief Mechanical Engineer (CME) of the CSAR, they were built along similar lines to the Class 10-2 which had been delivered to the CSAR earlier in that same year, but they were slightly smaller and had smaller coupled wheels.

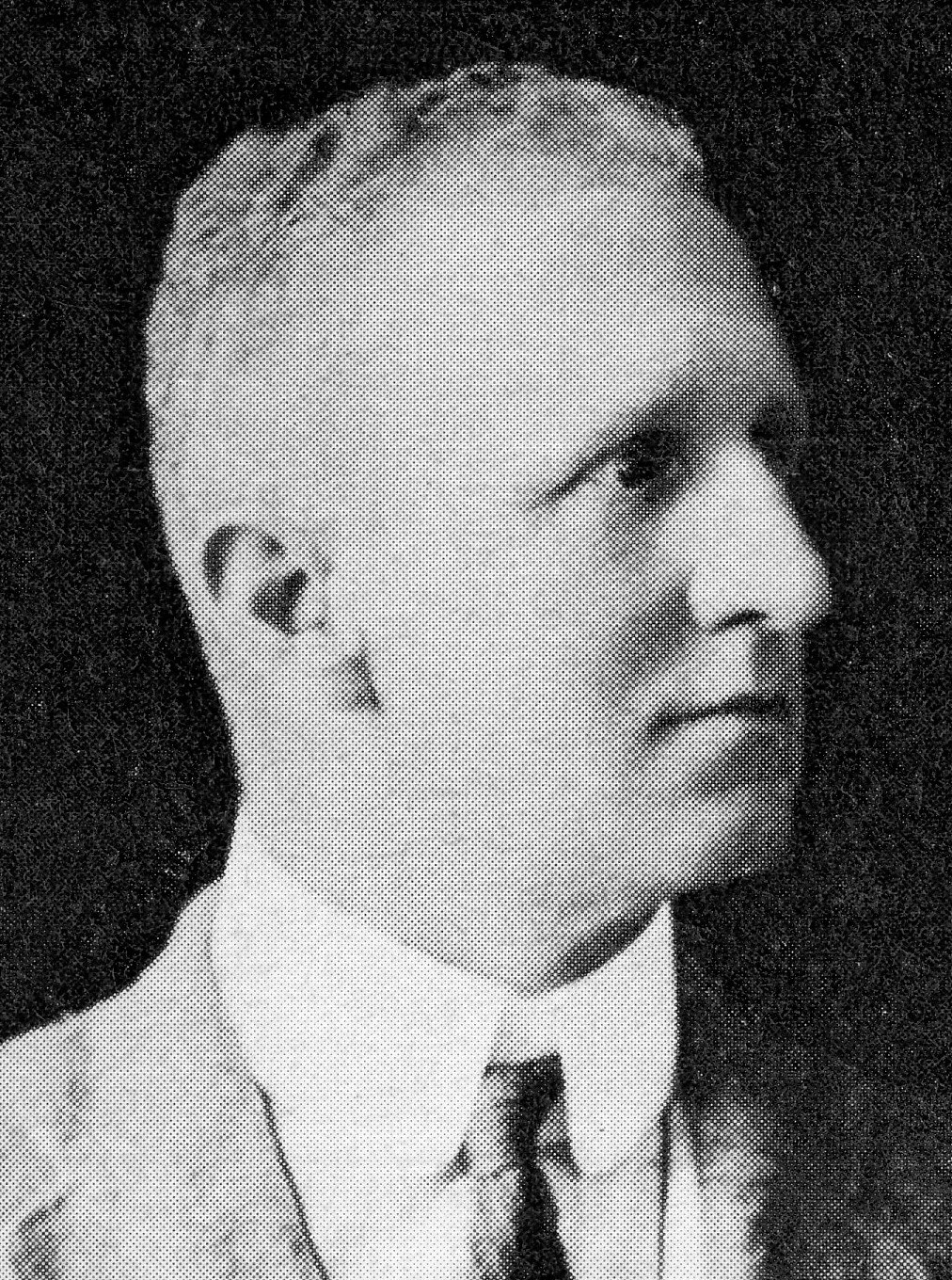
G.G. Elliot

They were built for the CSAR by the North British Locomotive Company (NBL) and were designated Class 10-C, numbered in the range from 1003 to 1014. As built, they used saturated steam and had Belpaire fireboxes and Walschaerts valve gear.

They embodied some of the features of their larger Class 10-2 superheated predecessors, with the notable exceptions of the feedwater heaters and superheating. They were also fitted with the Flaman speed recorder, of which the driving gear was connected to the right trailing crank pin. A new feature was the placing of the Pyle National turbo-generator unit behind the dome on top of the boiler barrel.

== Tenders ==
Since they were originally intended for local passenger work around the Reef, the locomotives had been delivered with comparatively small Type XC tenders with a coal capacity of 5 long tons (5.1 tonnes) and 2,600 imperial gallons (11,800 litres) of water.

Their outside-admission piston valves with straight-ported cylinders made them extraordinarily free runners and they were soon found suitable for the mainline as well. To better equip them to handle mainline passenger trains, an order for new larger Type XM2 tenders was placed with Robert Stephenson and Company. Since the original tenders were already numbered for their respective engines, the new tenders, with works numbers D1540/1 to D1540/12, were numbered N1 to N12. They had a coal capacity of 10 long tons (10.2 tonnes) and 4,000 imperial gallons (18,200 litres) of water.

In March 1922, one of these engines, no. 775 with a new Type XM2 tender, worked a special Johannesburg-Cape Town fast passenger train over the Klerksdorp-Kimberley section. The locomotive covered the 182 miles (293 kilometres) with the 320 long tons (325 tonnes) train in 5 hours 55 minutes, including 34 minutes which were lost taking water and attending to a hot-running big-end bearing, attaining an average speed of 33.75 miles per hour (54 kilometres per hour). This was a creditable performance for a comparatively small locomotive with only 57 inches (1,448 millimetres) coupled wheels and which, at the time, was not yet superheated.

== Superheating ==
With the new larger tenders, the locomotives were therefore put to work on the Kimberley-Klerksdorp line. To enhance their performance in their new role as mainline locomotives, they were soon reboilered and equipped with superheaters, but they retained their Class 10C classification.

== South African Railways ==
When the Union of South Africa was established on 31 May 1910, the three Colonial government railways (Cape Government Railways, Natal Government Railways and CSAR) were united under a single administration to control and administer the railways, ports and harbours of the Union. Although the South African Railways and Harbours came into existence in 1910, the actual classification and renumbering of all the rolling stock of the three constituent railways were only implemented with effect from 1 January 1912.

In 1912, these locomotives were renumbered in the range from 767 to 778 and designated Class 10C on the South African Railways (SAR).

== Watson standard boilers ==
In the 1930s, many serving locomotives were reboilered with a standard boiler type, designed by then CME A.G. Watson as part of his standardisation policy. Such Watson Standard reboilered locomotives were reclassified by adding an "R" suffix to their classification.

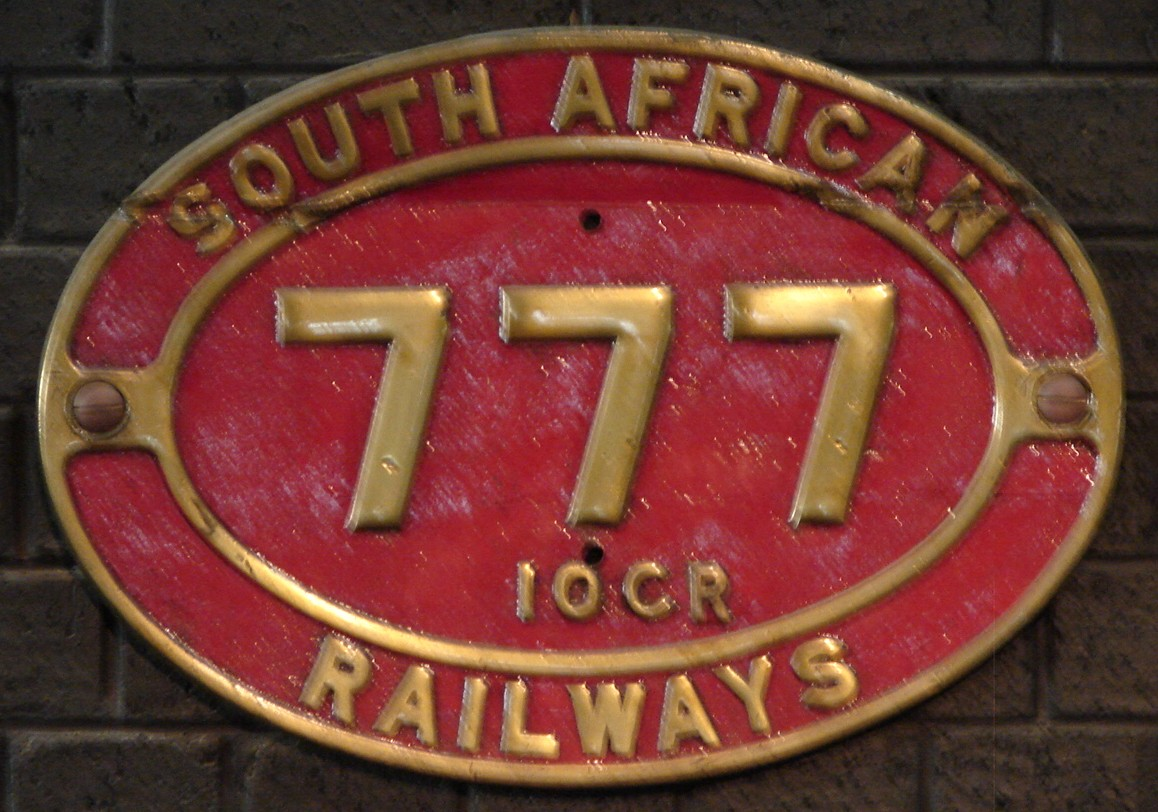

All but two of the Class 10C locomotives, numbers 772 and 776, were eventually reboilered with Watson Standard no. 1 boilers and reclassified to Class 10CR.

Their original boilers were fitted with Ramsbottom safety valves, while the Watson Standard boilers were fitted with Pop safety valves. An obvious difference between an original and a Watson Standard reboilered locomotive is usually a rectangular regulator cover, just to the rear of the chimney on the reboilered locomotive. In the case of the Class 10CR locomotives, an even more obvious difference was the absence of the Belpaire firebox hump between the cab and boiler on the reboilered locomotives.

== Service ==
When the Kimberley-Klerksdorp line was eventually relaid with heavier rails, the Class 10CR were displaced by larger and more powerful locomotives and transferred to Cape Town, where most of them worked the local inter-urban services. Part of their duties was to haul the weekly mail trains between the East Pier and Monument Station. On Fridays, the Union-Castle Line's mailship berthed at the East Pier, from where mail trains to Transvaal and Rhodesia would depart. A shunting engine would bring these carriages from the pier via Dock Road to Monument Station, where the mainline locomotive, dining saloon, kitchen car and carriages for local passengers would be attached. They remained in this service until they were later relegated to shunting and goods pickup work for the rest of their years.

The two Class 10C locomotives went to Bloemfontein to assist with shunting. After the entire Class was withdrawn in 1973, no. 771 was sold to Lorraine gold mine in the Free State. After being retired from mine service, it was obtained by Sandstone Estates for restoration in 2011.

== Works numbers ==
The table lists the locomotive and tender works numbers, the CSAR to SAR renumbering and the tender numbers for the Class 10C and 10CR locomotives.

Class 10C & 10CR 4-6-2 Locomotive & Tender Works Numbers & Numbers
Works No.	CSAR No.	SAR No.	Tender Works No.	Tender No.	Class
19195	1003	767	D1540/1	N1	10CR
19196	1004	768	D1540/2	N2	10CR
19197	1005	769	D1540/3	N3	10CR
19198	1006	770	D1540/4	N4	10CR
19199	1007	771	D1540/5	N5	10CR
19200	1008	772	D1540/6	N6	10C
19201	1009	773	D1540/7	N7	10CR
19202	1010	774	D1540/8	N8	10CR
19203	1011	775	D1540/9	N9	10CR
19204	1012	776	D1540/10	N10	10C
19205	1013	777	D1540/11	N11	10CR
19206	1014	778	D1540/12	N12	10CR

== Illustration ==
The main picture shows Watson Standard reboilered Class 10CR no. 778, with a large dome cover, passing through Woltemade No. 4 near Cape Town, c. 1930. Woltemade No. 4 no longer exists and was located between the present-day Thornton and Goodwood stations on the line from Cape Town to Bellville. The pictures illustrate the differences in the appearance of the locomotives over their lifespan.

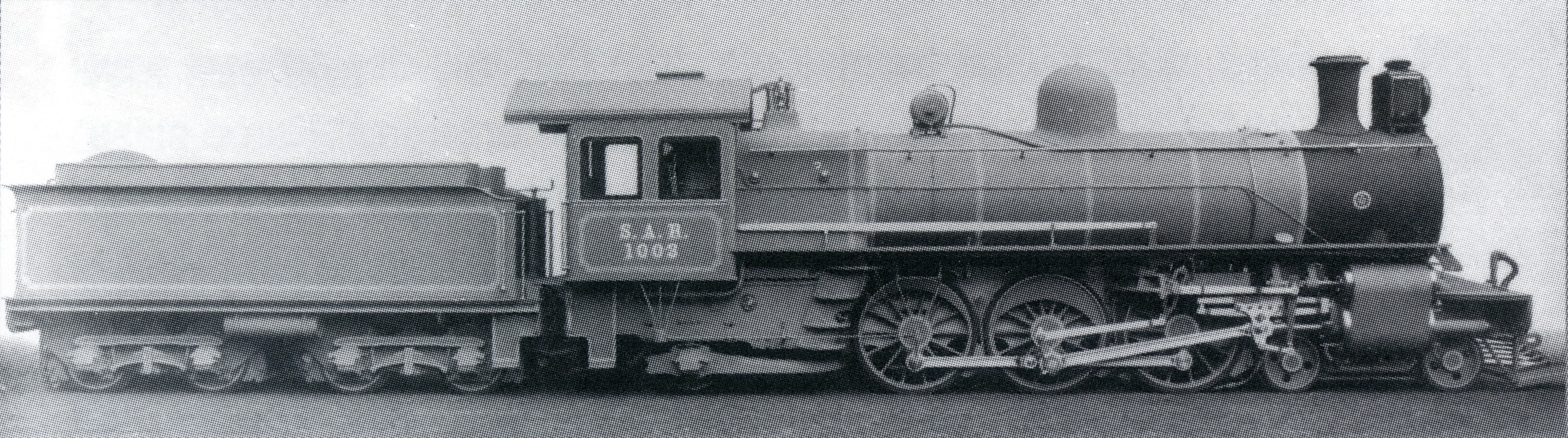
No. 1003, as built, with its original Type XC tender

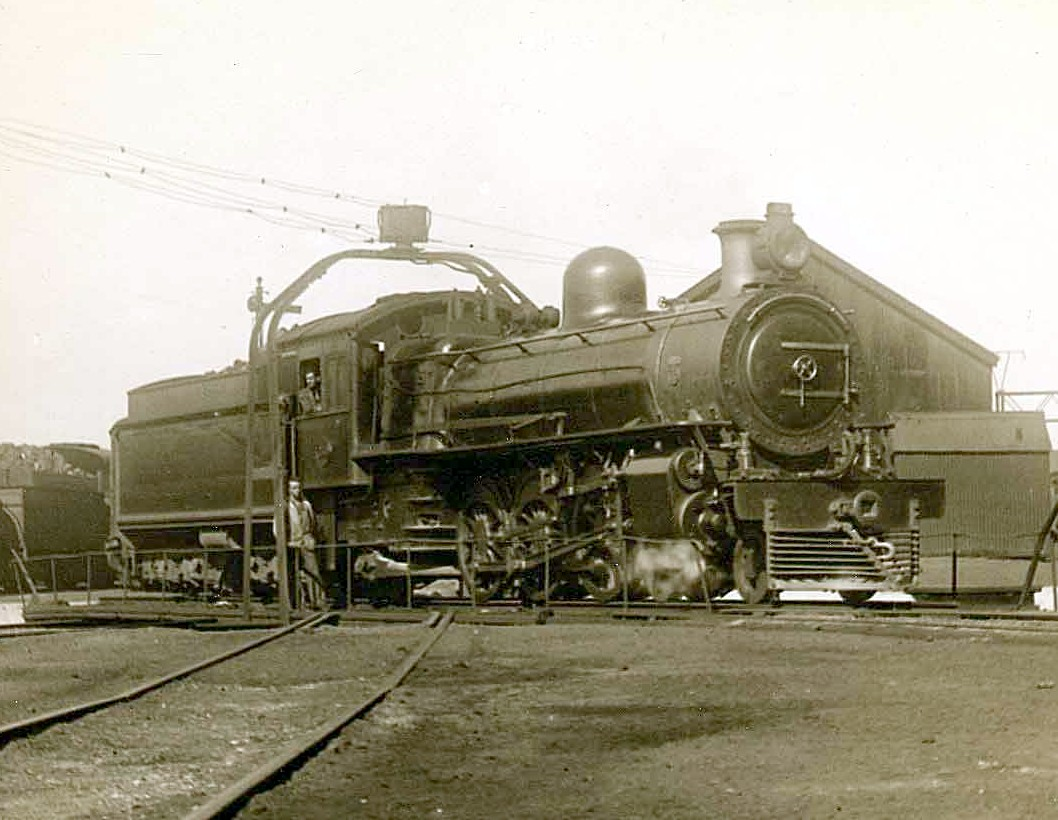
Class 10C and crew on the old Cape Town turntable, c. 1930

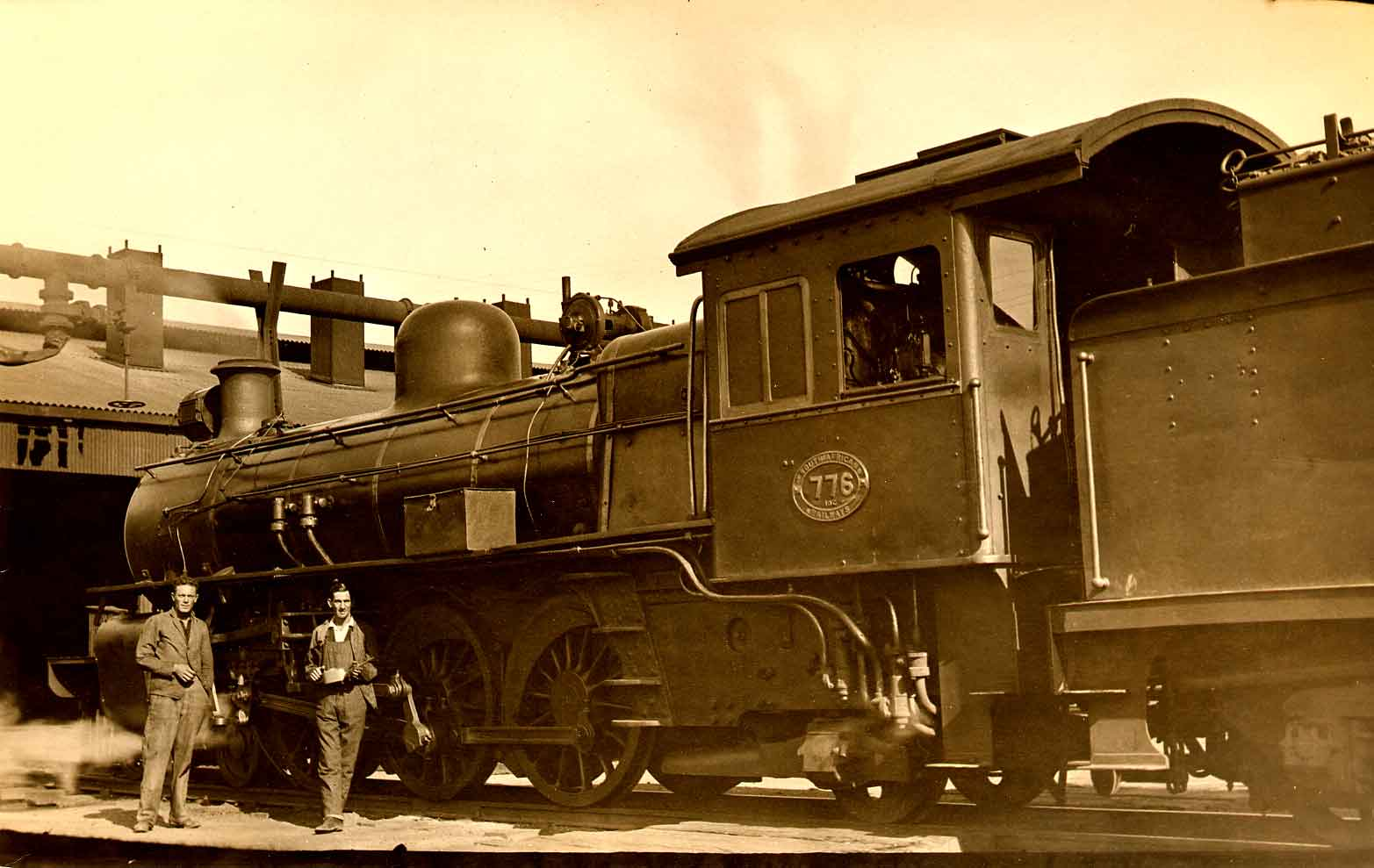
No. 776, with its original Belpaire firebox, c. 1930

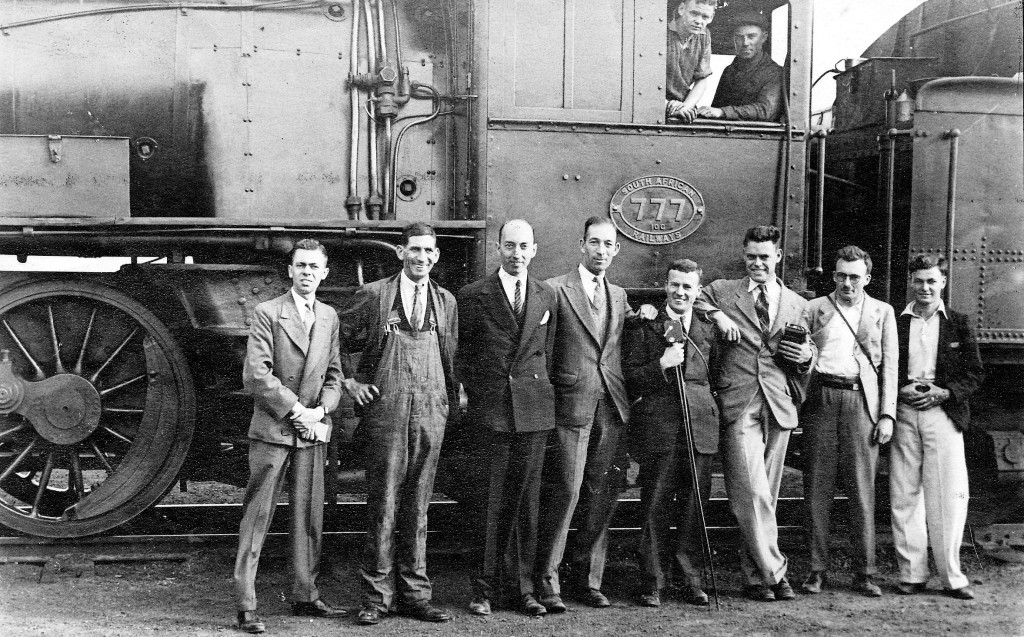
1930's Railway Circle photographers with no. 777, c. 1932

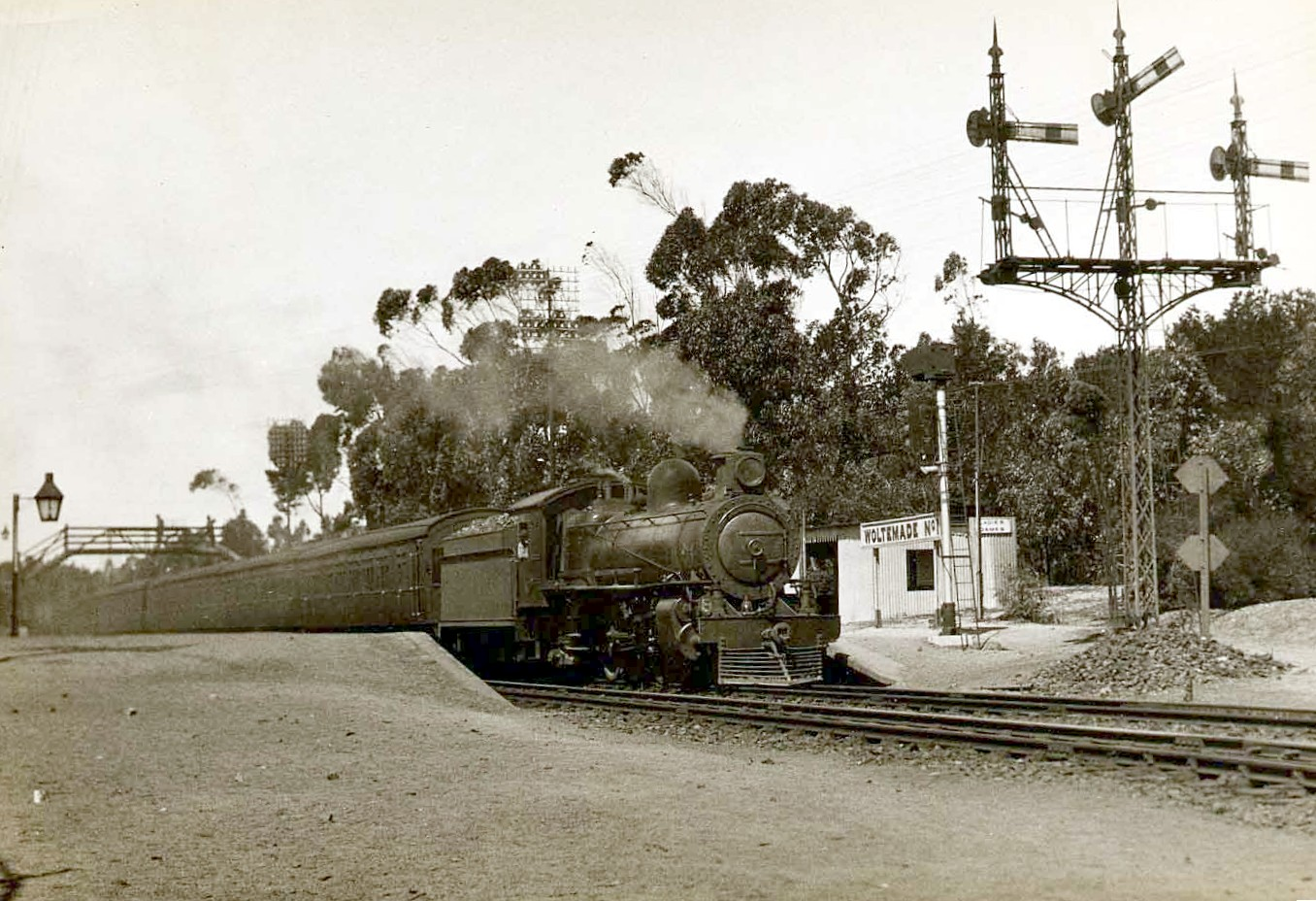
Class 10C departing from Woltemade No. 1 towards Cape Town, c. 1933

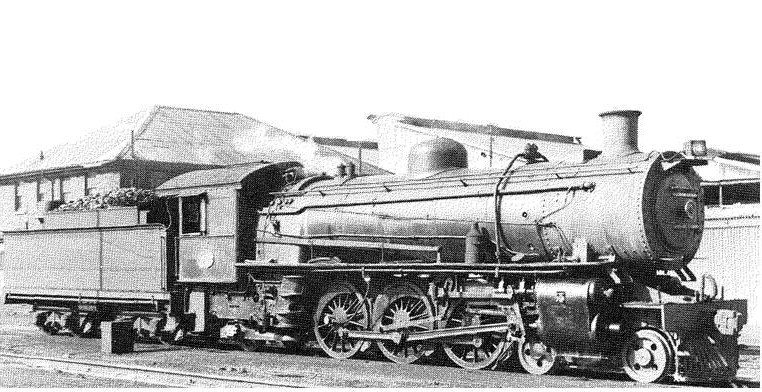
Class 10CR, reboilered with a Watson Standard no. 1 boiler, c. 1970, to judge by the sealed beam automobile headlights
