= Criminal responsibility in French law =

Criminal responsibility in French criminal law is the obligation to answer for infractions committed and to suffer the punishment provided by the legislation that governs the infraction in question.

In a democracy citizens have rights but also duties: with freedom comes responsibility.

Unlike civil liability, the obligation to answer for damage one has caused, either by repairing it or paying damages and interest for it, criminal responsibility implies legal recourse for the state against a disturbance of the peace. This includes three major factors:

- participation in a criminal offense
- forms of criminal responsibility
- exceptions to criminal responsibility.

== Participation ==
=== The author and the co-author ===
- The material author of the infraction is the person who physically performs the actions necessary to make up the criminal action. In the case of a murder this would be the person who struck the fatal blow. For crimes of omission the material author would be the person who didn't act when he had the possibility to save someone. Under the Ancien régime a collective responsibility was often envisaged. This concept disappeared in the codes, although jurisprudence sometimes makes use of a concept of collective guilt, but this is most apparent in conspiracy cases. (Article 450-1) Indeed, in a conspiracy, each participant in the group is considered the principal author of the infraction.
- The co-author materially participates in events at the side of the principal author, and incurs the same prescribed penalties, even if the principal author is in the end finally declared non-responsible, as in a case of dementia for example. The co-author may have extenuating circumstances such as youth. Aggravating circumstances are also possible, such as recidivism. Not to be confused with the accomplice, who would, for example, be the person who furnished the killer with a weapon.
- The moral author acts in the wings to have the crime committed, for example someone who pays to have a person killed or to have an object stolen, and is sometimes also called the intellectual author. French law doesn't really have this concept and such actions are addressed as conspiracies and sometimes described as complicity by provocation or by instruction.
- In the transition from the Napoleonic penal code of 1810 to the newer reformed criminal code, the reform commission considered including an autonomous criminal responsibility for intellectual authors but quickly abandoned the idea in the face of the difficulty of implementing such a modification of the criminal code while at the same time still preserving freedoms. However, in certain cases the moral authors may be prosecuted for the offense themselves, for instance for provocation to suicide or untruths. The untruths themselves are not criminal offences, nor is suicide. The "Perben 2" law of 2004 also created a specific infraction of instigating a crime, and sanctions the moral author of certain crimes, even when the instigation was not successful and the crime was not committed.

=== Attempt ===
The penal code declares that the authorship of a crime includes not just the person who commits the incriminating act, but also he who in the cases provided by the law, only attempts to commit it.

An attempt is constituted when a beginning of execution has manifested and only was suspended or failed to have an effect because of circumstances independent of the author's will (Article 121-5)

A person is an accomplice who knowingly offers aid or assistance to the preparation or commission of an infraction. A person is equally an accomplice a person who by gift, promise, threat order abuse of authority or of power provokes into an infraction or who gives instructions for committing it (Article 121-7)

Article 121-4 of the penal code says that trying to commit a crime is punishable, but attempting to commit a misdemeanor is not, unless a law specifically so provides. Attempting to commit an infraction is never an offense. The author of an attempt is considered an author of the actual infraction of the penal code, and incurs the same penalties as if his attempt had succeeded.

==== Material element ====
===== The beginning of execution =====
An attempt must manifest through the beginning of the commission of the infraction. The actor is no longer at the stage of preparatory actions, yet has not yet entirely found himself involved in the principal infraction. Jurisprudence defines the beginning of execution as the act or acts that "directly tend to the consommation of the infraction" (tendant directement à la consommation de l'infraction).

Example: arrêt Lacour, crim. 25 October 1962: Mr Lacour paid an individual to murder the adopted son of his mistress. The hired killer pretended to kidnap the adopted son, then collected his payment before reporting Lacour to the police. Lacour was prosecuted, notably, for attempted murder.

He was acquitted however, on the theory that his actions did not tend either directly or immediately towards the death of the victim. In reality, his actions were not attempted murder; they amounted to attempted conspiracy to commit murder. No matter what, Lacour would never have been a murderer, just an accomplice. Without having acted immediately and directly to commit the crime, he did not have a punishable attempt under the law of intent (although his actions could nonetheless be sanctioned under other criteria).

Attempted insurance fraud has given place to an important piece of jurisprudence: simply simulating a fire is merely a non-punishable act of preparation, because it does not result immediately and directly in disbursement of the policy amount. On the other hand, submitting a claim to the insurance company after making a false statement to the police would constitute the beginning of execution for the crime of fraud. A false declaration or statement, accompanied by fraudulent manoeuvers, or by staging or manipulating the evidence, have also been considered to amount to a beginning of execution.

===== Failure to voluntarily desist =====
An attempt is a failed crime and the failure of that crime was contrary to the will of its author. On the other hand, preparing then voluntarily desisting from the criminality before the crime is committed halts any prosecution.

This mechanism can be explained differently. The person who voluntarily renounces his criminal business has shown that he wasn't dangerous. The law encourages future wrongdoers to renounce their path and offers impunity as a reward. One can equally explain the mechanism by justifying its prevention of criminal attempts: the idea is to punish the person whose irrevocable criminal intention has not yet led him to carry out the crime in question. So the person who renounces his criminal intentions proves by doing so that they were not irrevocable, and therefore in law there was no attempted crime.

If the attempt failed for reasons beyond the intentions of its author, such as a missed shot, an unexpected passerby or the arrival of law enforcement, a stooge unexpectedly quitting, or sometimes the actions of the victim (a rapist fleeing because of victim's screams), the attempted crime is punishable.

The failure to voluntarily desist does not necessarily require the intervention of an outside force: Crim. 10 janvier 1996 held that an attempted rape which could not be completed due to the criminal's sexual dysfunction was nevertheless an attempted rape.

The problem may arise where the causes of the criminal stopping before he commits a crime was are mixed; for example, a moralizing friend dissuades an offender from committing a planned burglary.(Crim. 20 mars 1974). Circumstances in such cases have not forced him to desist but he hasn't independently or spontaneously opted not to commit the crime either.

The letter of the law, article 121-5 of the penal code, specifies that an attempted crime has occurred when the criminal action did not succeed solely because of circumstances independent of the defendant's actions.

The problem of an offender who flees in fear, for example, perhaps because he heard a noise, must be evaluated on a case-by-case basis. Jurisprudence generally seems to lean towards impunity when the fear was spontaneous.

Voluntarily desisting must come before the action is taken in order to absolve the defendant of responsibility. Some specialized statutes reward active repentance after an offense is committed, the conspiracy statutes for example, but these remain the exception. Penal law does not as such take into account voluntarily desisting from further offenses after a crime has been committed, seeing this as remorse with no judicial value.

==== Moral element ====
The author of the attempted crime must have had the intent to carry it out. This element, which does not seem particularly remarkable at first glance, is nonetheless essential. This criminal intent justifies preventing attempted crime, regardless of any disturbances of the public order.

==== A special case of attempt: the impossible infraction ====
Impossible offenses are those which were not carried out, not because of clumsiness or a chance intervening event, but because of an objective impossibility to commit the offence.

Some impossibilities are legislated into criminality: for example, the old penal code defined a crime of aborting a woman believed to be pregnant. This can be compared to provisions that refer to real or supposed attributes of certain persons, especially in matters of discrimination (article 225-1) of the penal code. It might seem impossible to be guilty of antisemitism towards a person who isn't Jewish, but this putative infraction is nonetheless outlawed.

Hypothetical impossible infractions unanticipated by legislators remain. Initially, 19th-century jurisprudence considered that if an offense was impossible it was also impossible to outlaw it. Since the offense had not been committed, the only possible grounds to prosecute it would be as an attempted crime.

The reasoning that leads to impunity relies on the very definition of an attempt: starting to execute the criminal action means performing the individual physical movements that lead directly and immediately to the criminal act. When the action is impossible there can exist no actions that tend to lead to it either directly or immediately. Therefore, no punishable attempted crime takes place; what does occur is a disturbance in the public peace.

This reasoning, which has legality going for it as well as a certain rationality, however, allowed offenders to escape prosecution who had nonetheless demonstrated their dangerousness and the irrevocability of their criminal determination. Faced with this reproach, jurisprudence took a middle path, seeking inspiration in doctrinal propositions which notably sought to distinguish between absolute and relative impossibility.

The former occurs when the object of the infraction does not exist, such as in the murder of a corpse, or when the means are intrinsically ineffective, such as poisoning with a non-toxic substance. Relative impossibility exists when the object of it exists but cannot for the moment be reached, or when the means used could have succeeded, a badly-aimed bullet for example. The doctrine also proposed a distinction between impossibility in fact (prosecutable) vs impossibility in law, where a critical element of the infraction is missing.

None of these criteria proved intellectually or judicially satisfactory. The Court of cassation, the French court of final appeal, eventually elected to systematically prosecute impossible infractions within its jurisdiction; see the Perdereau decision of 16 January 1986. In this case the crime was the attempted murder of a cadaver.

The Court of cassation underlined that the prior demise of the victim was a circumstance beyond the author's control, which could be analyzed as a failure to voluntarily desist, leading to the failure of the planned criminality. The court added that the violence done to the cadaver constituted a beginning to execute the murder. This interpretation does not correspond to the classic definition of beginning to execute; in no case can striking a cadaver lead directly or immediately or in the long term for that matter to the death of a human being.

It is a putative crime, which exists only in the mind of its author, but which is prosecuted because the blows that were struck were struck in the intention of committing the crime. The beginning of execution was not the primary element of this attempt; the attempted crime is used here more as a means to prove irrevocable intention.

Since this decision one may ask about the survival of classical solutions to imaginary infractions:

- is statutory rape carried out against an adult an attempted statutory rape?
- Planning an assassination that uses sorcery and spells, would that be attempted murder?
- Is theft of an object that one actually owns attempted theft

The doctrine excludes from proceedings the hypotheses about motive that they cannot attribute to any crime, contrary to the attempted commission of an impossible infraction it considered sufficient proof of intent to commit a crime. Still, a perceptible difference still separates a murderous attack that would have succeeded if the person had been alive from an allegedly sorcerous assassination, assuming that you don't believe in sorcerous assassination.

The danger is falling into mindless prosecution of simple thoughts and possibly of the desires or craving to do things the justice system would consider criminal, which would essentially amount to thought crime.

=== The accomplice ===
An accomplice furnishes help or assistance that facilitates the preparation or execution of a crime or other offence:"whoever by gift, promise, threat, order, or abuse of authority or power gives instructions to commit an infraction."

Complicity may be defined as a temporary, even momentary, understanding between individuals who are going to commit or try to commit one or more infractions. More simply, an accomplice participates in the action without himself needing to meet each element of the criteria that make up the infraction. As with the infraction itself, assessing the extent of complicity will depend in each case on legal, material and moral elements.

==== Material element ====
Legislators have narrowly and precisely defined the behaviors that can be charged as complicity:

- Help or assistance: Help with the preparation or commission of the offense. This can range from standing lookout to furnishing stamps for false documents to loaning a vehicle.
- Provocation or instigation: This behavior pushes the author of the offense to commit it, using a means foreseen by the legislation. Thus not all forms of provocation are punishable, only those carried out by:
  - gift
  - threat
  - promise
  - order
  - abuse of authority or power.
    - Also, whatever method is used must be sufficiently suggestive, individual or direct. Simple advice or suggestion cannot be penalized. And the incitement must be followed by an effect; a murder committed two years later for completely different reasons cannot be criminalized.
- Instructions are information given to facilitate or allow commission of the offense, such as providing the floor plan of a bank building to a robber. For complicity to exist causality must be established.

Legislators have also provided for a number of cases where complicity is not punishable:

- passive assent

In principle, abstention is never punishable and this has been fairly consistent in case law. In some cases however the judge decided that inaction was punishable, especially where the person had a protective role towards the author, his parents for example, or people whose work this is, such as policemen or guards. Thus in 1989 a mother was found guilty of leaving a weapon available to her son, who used it to kill his father. This theory holds that an accomplice by abstention is punishable if he knew about the offense, and had the means to prevent it but refrained, so that the crime was committed.

- complicity after the fact

In principle help given after the primary act has been performed is not criminalized, but here too legislators have enacted exceptions, criminalizing certain behaviors such as concealing the fruit of a crime, or its author, for example. Case law holds that help after the fact constitutes complicity if it results from a prior agreement. (Although one might suppose that the help is actually constituted by the agreement itself; in effect, promising the offender assistance after the crime is what made up his mind to take action.) The Court of cassation seems to also endorse guilty findings when the offender is an habitual delinquent and the help encourages him to repeat his bad behavior.

==== Moral element ====
The material element cannot be the only criteria as this would engender a climate of suspicion harmful to society. So, therefore, a person can only become an accomplice willingly, and must be aware of the offender's plans and agree with them. Also, if the project described to the accomplice differs from the one that is carried out, the accomplice will only be held to account for the project of which he had knowledge. Therefore, if he loaned a firearm to intimidate and not to kill, he cannot be held responsible for the murder, although this requires also that the difference between the plan and the reality be noticeable. so if simple theft was intended and this became theft with breaking and entering this breaking and entering will be taken into account. Normally there can be no complicity in unintentional offenses but in certain cases, especially faults of imprudence, such as inciting someone to run a red light or to drive while drunk, complicity may be retained.

==== Legal element ====
Criminal law, unlike civil law, allows very little freedom of interpretation to the judge and the legislator must foresee that which is legally an act of complicity, and in particular the theory of borrowing criminality.

- The primary action must be a criminal offense: thus one cannot be prosecuted for having helped in the commission of an act which is not an infraction. The case of provocation to suicide mentioned above is an infraction in itself, although suicide itself is not.
- In the old penal code the infraction must have had a certain severity (at least have been a misdemeanor) but under the new code it is possible to be an accomplice to a merely citable offense.
- The principal act must have been committed: an accomplice who organizes everything but whose principal author does not begin execution cannot be prosecuted. The infraction must at least have been attempted. If a fact may justify the infraction—legitimate defense for example—the infraction is erased and that of the accomplice as well. In cases of immunity, or theft between spouses, the accomplice cannot be prosecuted, unless the judge determines that the person presented as an accomplice is in fact a co-author, in which case he is still within reach of prosecution.

Procedurally, the statute of limitations for an accomplice runs from the same day as for the principal author, and the withdrawal of a victim's complaint puts an end to prosecution of the accomplice as well. Amnesty for the infraction also benefits the accomplice.

Another question is whether complicity in complicity is punishable. Article 121-7 specifies that a second-degree complicity is only legally punishable with respect to knowing or informed help or assistance, even through the intermediary of another accomplice in the case of fraud, but the jurisprudence is rather severe and generally finds complicity even in the third degree.

In addition, while it is necessary that the infraction be punishable for complicity to be punishable, the infraction need not necessarily be punished. A guilty verdict for the accomplice is not tied to the sanction of the principal author of the crime. Thus if the principal author is not prosecuted for reasons of dementia, the accomplice can still be prosecuted, and the same if the principal author has died or could not be arrested.

==== Sanction incurred ====
The principle in the old pernal code was that the accomplice and the author incur the same penalties,

In the new code, the co-author does not necessarily face the same penally as the principal author. Also, he must have been able to commit the primary offense to be sentenced for it. For example, an individual cannot be charged with an offense that can only be committed by a member of law enforcement; he can at most be an accomplice.

Henceforth any personal circumstances that might play in the favor of a principal author no longer do the same for an accomplice, the same real circumstances of the act (break-in, provocation, carrying a weapon) that could be held for or against the principal author will do sa as well for the accomplice.

For example, in the case of a homicide committed by two persons, one of whom is the son of the victim, the latter, even if only an accomplice to the murder of his father, can receive as heavy a sentence as the principal author, since parricide constitutes a mixed aggravating circumstance.

== Persons responsible: the principle of responsibility for personal actions ==
=== Physical persons subject to criminal responsibility ===
- According to article 121-1 of the new penal code, "none are penally responsible for any but their own actions." (Nul n'est responsable pénalement que de son propre fait.) In the old code this rule existed only in case law. One exception exists, the actions committed by a person under the authority of another. In this precise case, the person with authority can be found guilty of the actions committed by the person under his authority. Such would be the head of a company when an employee causes an accident while making a delivery for the enterprise. He can escape this responsibility by proving a prior delegation of authority, in which case the holder of the authority will be responsible.

==== Minors ====
Normally the attributes of the person do not affect his criminal responsibility, except for the one case where the person is a minor. This distinction is based in part on a difference between the abilities of children and of adults to understand mistakes. Minors, therefore, benefit from dedicated courts, but procedures and penalties also differ.

===== History =====
Until 1912, there were no court procedures specifically geared to minors. It was generally understood that if a sentence were to be imposed on a minor, he benefitted from the "excuse of youth", which generally reduced the penalty by half.

The law of 22 July 1912 transformed the system by putting juvenile courts into place, along with an absolute presumption of non-responsibility for minors 13 and under. Special penalties were also created in the law, such as supervised freedom, which allowed the minor to be placed in an institution and thus to be re-educated.

Then came the ordonnance du 2 février 1945 on delinquent childhood, which, while reworked several times, remains in effect today. In this system it is the personality of the author more than the act itself which enters into account. The system is above all preventive and more geared to avoiding recidivism than to sanctioning a mistake.

==== Advent of the responsibility of minors ====
In France, a minor of 13 cannot be sentenced to a penalty, but is nonetheless responsible for his actions. Article 122-8 of the code pénal provides that "Minors capable of discernment are penally responsible for the crimes, misdemeanors or offences of which they have been found guilty.

Article 122-8 is without possible appeal: a minor who has discernment is responsible for his actions. Still, the many measures that apply to him tend to sow doubt among legal practitioners and some works still speak of the non-responsibility of delinquent juveniles.

The ordonnance n° 45-171 of 2 February 1945 considers the following categories of minor and the measures it envisages for them:

- Minor of 10 without discernment: absolute penal non-responsibility
- Minor of 13 with discernment (sole discretion of the judge, 8 years on average): incurs "infliction of educational measures". A distinction must be made between children younger than 10 and those aged 10–13 subject to educational sanctions, controversial measures since they sit at the border between penalty and education.
- Minor aged 13 to 16: Beyond educational measures the legal system tends to consider their responsibility attenuated and they incur only half of the common-law penalty, which cannot exceed 20 years of incarceration. and 7,500 in fines.
- Minor aged 16 to 18: also has the benefit of the excuse of minority, but it can in principle be withdrawn in cases of a second repeat offense of specific offenses, or when "the circumstances of the case and the personality of the minor warrant this" ("lorsque les circonstances de l'espèce et la personnalité du mineur le justifient").

=== Responsibility of leaders and deciders ===
To ensure that certain legal and regulatory provisions are complied with, legislators have over the 20th century accompanied them with penal sanctions. Generally these have been obstructive offenses destined to prevent serious damage, for example in the case of hygiene and workplace security, of the environment, finance, union rights a collective framework: regulation of some economic activities, of paid work, of public open spaces.

For an infraction to be described as preventive it should not so much incriminate the damaging behavior as the omission of a behavior that is required by law.

How to impute a crime of omission to a person while respecting the principle of personal responsibility?

An offender will, logically, be a person that regulation had exhorted to act, only the person who has an obligation to act can be reproached with not acting.

Some legal obligations to act weigh individually on every citizen: assistance to persons in danger, refraining from homicides and wounding through carelessness.

Others have the specific trait of not being possible to commit except in a social framework: for example, regulation of certain economic activities, of salaried work, of public spaces.

The law addresses an injunction to leaders and decision-makers of the collective: whether corporate president, mayor of a municipality, chairman of the general council or manager of a business, the decision-maker must use his powers to monitor the respect of laws in place, either by obeying legal obligations or by monitoring the compliance of his subordinates.

If the moral element of the infraction no doubt belongs to the person who commits it, since the delegate has no autonomy, the perception of the material element is more problematic. If the decider had respected the law, he would have ordered the subordinate to act or not to act in a certain way; he would not have respected the restrictions of regulation but he would have had them respected by a subaltern. When they have not been respected, the decision-maker appears not as a material author of the infraction but as a moral author, almost an accomplice. Often applied to infractions of omission, nonetheless, the distinction between a material author and one who simply had an offending desire is tenuous.

This is why one can reproach the director who was to respect and enforce the applicable rules of failing to do so. If the infraction was apparently committed by a third subordinate, the decider is indeed responsible for not having acted. This responsibility of the decider does not violate the principle of responsibility for personal actions. It also does not exonerate the subordinate of his own responsibility, if the elements of an infraction can be imputed to him.

As well, the decider in principle must submit proof of his absence of fault, even if this proof would in practice be difficult to produce: the decider is assumed to know the rules that apply to his activity and is most often blamed for not respecting them or ensuring they are respected. Example: a mayor is personally guilty of favoritism because he set the agenda and presided over the meeting of the municipal council that violated legal restrictions (Crim. 19 novembre 2003).

When the decision-maker in fact is not the decision-maker in law, the Court of cassation adopts a solution similar to that of the civil jurisdictions in similar circumstances: the decision-makers are co-authors of the infraction, and each can be pursued as if he were the only decider (Crim. 12 septembre 2000).

The judicial administrator of a company, invested with the powers of the executive, also assumes his responsibility and qualities.

It has nonetheless appeared that in large hierarchies the decider is not in practice responsible for the entirety of the business' activities. Worse, the decider cannot materially meet all the obligations that weigh on him: the head of an enterprise should constantly pay heed that safety instructions are being followed by workers, the rules of accounting and billing by the accounting department, labor laws are followed by the personnel office, and the rules of sanitation by the maintenance and upkeep departments… it does not seem either just or opportune to impute to him an infraction when the power of decision lay with a third party.

This is the mechanism of delegation of power.

==== Delegation of power ====
The criminal responsibility of the decision-maker is tied to the powers he holds over the functioning of the enterprise: these are the powers which allow him to be reproached with not acting, or with allowing an infraction to be committed.

One cannot disassociate this responsibility from the qualities of the powers of the decision-maker. As a result, the delegation of power also carries with it onto this third party the attendant criminal responsibility. This logical solution was endorsed by the Cour de cassation from the very start of the 20th century (28 juin 1902).

Delegation of power is a consensual act between a delegating decision-maker and a delegatee subordinate; writing is useful only as proof. One can imagine subdelegations with the same conditions of validity and effectiveness as the initial delegation. On the other hand, any co-delegation is ruled out: the delegate must enjoy an autonomy and power incompatible with the collective exercise of delegation.

The validity and effectiveness of the delegation of powers depend on several criteria brought out in the case law:

a. Delegation only exonerates of the responsibility in that capacity: in no case can a decider who personally took part in the consummation of an infraction avail himself of the delegation defense. The decision-maker who personally takes part in the infraction is responsible for his personal actions and, like any material author of the infraction, he can be punished. Only the responsibility incurred by failing to fulfil the obligations specifically incumbent on his functions can benefit from delegation of powers. Example : Crim. 17 septembre 2002, aggressive sales strategies, an element of fraud, remain imputable to the decision-maker despite the delegation of power, since he conceived and organized the strategies himself.

b. Delegation of powers is made necessary by the structure of the enterprise: only the decision-maker who cannot effectively assume his legal obligations can delegate his responsibilities to a third party. The mechanism of delegation of powers is not a means for the decision-maker to escape his criminal responsibility, but a mechanism to assure the effectiveness of legal limitations. It's when the scale or material organization of an enterprise do not allow a decision-maker to confront his obligations that delegation of power is authorized and even desirable. In the same spirit delegation cannot be general but must concern a precise sector of activity. This special character of the delegation is strictly interpreted by judges.

Example: Crim. 14 octobre 2003, the delegation of power in hygiene and security to an administrator, president of the Committee of Hygiene Security and Work Conditions (CHSCT), the mandated committee in every workplace, does not transfer the responsibility for not consulting CHSCT: an interference has been committed by the company decision-maker. The Court of Cassation seems to distinguish "technical" delegation in matters of hygiene and security, concrete, and a delegation of judicial or administrative obligations tied to the functioning of the CHSCT.

c. The delegate is a member of the enterprise provided with the competence, authority, and necessary means: the decision-maker must designate one of his subordinates or possibly the head of a daughter organization in a group of companies who has the technical competence, authority and material means permitting him, in practice, to bring to a successful conclusion the mission assigned to him by the delegation.

These conditions are to avoid fictitious delegations. For a subordinate to assume the criminal responsibility attached to certain responsibilities, the decision-maker must have put him in a position to effectively ensure the respect of the law. The decider who proceeds to a judicial delegation without effectively transmitting his powers will remain responsible in that capacity for the delegated matter.

The finding of the existence and regularity of a delegation of powers assures stems from the sovereign power of lower-court judges, who often show themselves rather severe with deciders, distrusting fictive delegations: Crim 10 septembre 2002, for example, in a matter of asbestos which finds the general delegation of organization and supervision of construction site safety.

The effect of this responsibility in that capacity associated to the mechanism of the delegation of power is to give decision-makers a real duty to delegate their responsibilities as soon as they cannot assume them themselves, which ensures maximum effectiveness of the regulation of their activity.

==== RPPM ====
To trigger the criminal responsibility of a corporation as author, the infraction must have been committed on behalf of the corporation by its agent or representative.

It's the mechanism for criminal responsibility by ricochet.

The corporation is not considered in criminal law as an autonomous person endowed with his or her power of decision and methods of action, but rather an abstract person incarnated by its representatives or agents.

RPPM is a mechanism that imputes to the corporation the offenses of one or more physical persons: the representative or the agent, in other words persons with the legal, statutory of conventional power to engage the corporation, and notably the delegate of a representative with the ability, authority and means necessary to perform this mission.

An infraction committed by a stranger to the corporation, and sometimes by acts foreign to the scope of representation, or a crime which is not committed on behalf of the corporation (i.e. in its interest or in its name) cannot be imputed to it.

Imputation of an infraction to a corporation supposes the elements of the crime are present, and is more often done to physical people à une personne morale suppose la réunion de tous les éléments de l'infraction, le plus souvent sur la tête d'une personne physique identifiée, organe ou représentant de la personne morale. Les juges ne peuvent en aucun cas établir l'existence des éléments de l'infraction directement dans le chef de la personne morale (Crim. 29 avril 2003).

A finding of non-responsibility for a representative or an agent in theory prevents the prosecution of corporations, even, it seems, in the case of a subjective cause of non-responsibility, a personal attributes of the agent such as demential, even though the solution is unclear in law.

A corporation constitutes an autonomous entity with a different judicial personality from that of its constituent parts. As, in theory, nothing allows applying to a person a subjective cause of non-responsibility applicable to a third party, il ne semble pas opportun de contrevenir à ce mécanisme dans l'hypothèse d'une personne morale, sauf à rompre l'égalité des justiciables devant la loi pénale.

The disappearance of the corporation naturally puts an end to prosecution, this even in the case of merger or acquisition. The principle of responsibility for personal actions runs counter to the acquiring entity or person of responsibility for infractions committed by the acquired business (Crim. 14 octobre 2003).

== Causes of criminal non-responsibility ==
If the author of an infraction has a cause for a finding of non-responsibility, he will not be condemned due to his absence of responsibility, even if the facts that constitute the infraction are established and guilt recognized.

Doctrine, like jurisprudence, operates a distinction that does not appear in the penal code among the objective causes of not-responsible findings, or justifying facts, or the subjective causes of non-responsibility, or non-imputability.

=== Objective causes of non-responsibility (justifying facts) ===
Objective causes of penal non-responsibility, also called justifying facts, erase the punishable nature of the act. The impunity of the principal actor extends thereafter to the accomplice as well as the corporation.

Justifying facts are of three types:

- authorisation of the law, or order from a legitimate authority (article 122-4
- legitimate defense (articles 122-5 et 122-6 )
- state of necessity (article 122-7).

==== Authorisation of the law, order from a legitimate authority ====
The authorisation of law or regulation reveals a contradiction between a criminal law text and another law text, whether it contains civil, administrative or penal law. Authorisation of regulation can only justify regulatory contraventions and not violations of criminal law, as much because of the hierarchy of norms as because of the separation of the executive, legislative and judicial powers.

The liberal principle holds that interdiction is always the exception when it comes to liberty, so authorisation in law must always weigh heavier than the prohibitions of a different law of the same type.

The most recent applications of the justifying facts concern use of force by the police and by the gendarmerie, and medical acts, which are not qualified as violent if they are the acts of physicians and have a therapeutic motive. Also article 73 of the Code of penal procedure allows any citizen to arrest the author of a crime or misdemeanor punishable by a sentence of imprisonment, and to restrain that person until police arrive.

On January 5, 2000, the Cour de c Cour de cassation indicated that the justifying facts defense of authorization under law extends to involuntary infractions committed in the course of the execution of an act authorized by law, for example, clumsiness of a gendarme causing the death of the person he was lawfully pursuing.

This assumes, of course that the criteria to apply that authorization to the given situation were all in place, and that it was absolutely necessary for example for the gendarme to use his weapon, Crim. 18 February 2003.

This decision confirms that authorisation of law is not a subjective cause of non-responsibility; authorization does not make the moral element disappear, or else imprudence would remain punishable.

Authorisation under low can only cover exactly the facts detailed as authorized in the legislation. Also, the duty of cohabitation which mandates spouses to maintain sexual relations doesn't authorize one of them to impose sexual relations on the other. The right to arrest and restrain the author of a flagrant misdemeanor does not permit molesting, searching or questioning him before the police arrive.

Nor does an administrative notice, or authorisation to perfourrm an activity justify a violation of criminal law. Apparently the administrative authorities do not have the power to allow a behavior to escape from the scope of criminal law.

The Cour de cassation has found that the duty to assist a person in danger described in article 223-6 of the Code pénal did not justify the assistance given a miscreant by a nurse, once the services provided to him went beyond strictly necessary assistance required by the endangerment of the miscreant (Crim. 17 septembre 2003).

In addition to authorization under law, it is customary to allow minor actions on persons qui permet des atteintes without their author being troubled: thus, parents have a right to correct their children, people can practice violent sports or perform piercings or tattoos without being pursued for voluntary violence.

==== Legitimate defense ====
Legitimate defense is provided by article 122-5 of the penal code. This justifying fact benefits the person who, faced with an unjust and current attack against a person or a good, carries out a necessary, simultaneous and proportionate act in defense of that person or that good.

The elements of a legitimate defense are as follows:

- an unjust attack against oneself, others, or an asset. The unjust nature of the attack notably excludes legitimate violence like a policeman trying to protect the public order, or licit behaviours like confisating GMO corn.
- A concurrent attack, in other words, fighting back at the time of the attack. It is impossible to avail oneself of a legitimate defense argument for an act of vengeance, for example where a victim fires at an aggressor who is already running away. On the other hand, a defense prepared in advance (setting traps, electric fences) is valid as long as the defensive measures do not execute until there is an actual attack.
- necessary retaliation: in other words, to counter the attack, commission of an illicit act is necessary; there is no legal alternative to the retaliation.
- a response proportionate to the attack: the value sacrificed must be less than the value protected; the reply must engender a lower social cost than if the attack had been carried out.

Jurisprudence has been able to clarify the conditions for laying a legitimate defense argument.

The actual and unjust character of the attack poses no serious application problem. When the attack is an action of a public authority, its injustice may be perceived in cases of manifest illegality (beatings and night raids).

The necessary and proportionate character of the response is itself subject to the assessment of lower-court juges, and in function of the entirety of the circumstances of fact. The Court of Cassation decisions of 6 December 1995 et 21 February 1996 reveal a victim seized by the collar found guilty for having responded with blows from sharp claws but recognized as a legitimate defense for shooting a bullet into heart of the aggressor.

In many affairs that take place at night, it can be seen that determining the necessary and proportionate character of the response does not depend on the reality of the aggression, but rather on its gravity as perceived by the author of the riposte.

Rather than ponder the balance of interests that are really in play, the penal judge asks himself whether a reasonable person placed in the same situation would have reacted in the same way.

This subjective approach, which can lead to a finding of an admissibility for a purely putative claim of legitimate defense, in reaction to an imaginary aggression, explains the refusal to justify as legitimate defense involuntary infractions. A prudent man can control his actions and responds in a proportionate manner to an aggression of which he is victim; he will not commit any imprudent or negligeant acts bringing about the wounding or death of his aggressor.

This approach also justifies denying the benefit of legitimate defense to one who does not know he is in a defensive position: for example, a person who joins a brawl for the pleasure of fighting and who by chance becomes part of a group of victims in a state of legitimate defense. Legitimate defense would protect someone who while committing an illicit act does not commit a fault, or who reveals his lack of social dangerousness.

==== Necessity ====
A state of necessity is a true justifying fact, which covers even involuntary infractions: Crim. 16 juillet 1986 found a gendarme not criminally responsible for a bullet shot into the ground because he needed to intimidate someone, which wounded that person in a ricochet.

The determining criteria for the state of necessity to enter into play may be the balance between the protected interest and the sacrificed interest, as two arrests in the criminal chamber on May 11, 2004 . In this case (appeal n° 03-80.254), the guilty verdict of trial court judges of Sangachali-Duvanni on theft charges was overturned because the fraudulently-seized documents were to be used to defend the accused in litigation with her employer. The upper court (Haute jurisdiction) effectively found that on the one hand the strictly necessary character of the documents to the defense of the prosecuted person was not researched by the lower-court judges, given that the theft of the documents was carried out only in the intention of "legitimately preserving proofs" in the context of a lawsuit. The appeals court confirmed the same day in another case (appeal n° 03-85.521) the acquittal of a person prosecuted on a charge of theft.

=== Subjective causes of non-responsibility (non-imputability) ===
==== Coercion ====
Coercion is the penal equivalent of force majeure. It is an irresistible force. As in civil law, a debate exists concerning unforeseeability—is this a condition for the implementation of the idea or is it a corollary of irresistibility, foreseeable events being by nature resistible? The criminal chamber has required that the constraint be unforeseeable and irresistible. The law, however, mentions only irresistibility.

Coercion can be physical or moral; the important criteria are its irresistible characture and its causal tie to the crime. Coercion is a cause of non-imputability, but it must have abolished the discernment of the victim to be taken into account.

This could take the form of a natural disaster or an illness of the actor: a driver who becomes unwell due to an illness he did not know he had, is exonerated of all criminal responsibility for the consequences of the accident he may have caused.

The classical example of a moral coercion is coercion which results from pressure or blackmail which has abolished the discernment of the victim. The Court of cassation has been able to find that the alleged pressure of the German authorities on the person of Maurice Papon did not abolish his free will and he, therefore, remained responsible for his complicity in crimes against humanity (Crim. 23 janvier 1997).

The coercion will not be taken into account if it results from a fault or an imprudence of the person who acts. Thus, a person who knows himself subject to unwellness but who drives anyway, or who dozes off after starting a trip in an advanced state of fatigue, are responsible for homicide or involuntary wounding if they cause an accident.

==== Legal error ====
"Nemo censetur ignorare legem" (None should be ignorant of the law): the adage supplies a legal fiction (not a presumption or simple proof) which is necessary to the functions of all judicial systems.

Law rests on its compulsory character and one cannot envisage a judicial system in which individuals could avail themshelves of their ignorance of the law to escape its application.

When the penal code was reformed the lawmakers attempted to satisfy the imperatives of clarity and accessibility and list possible infractions hors code, outside the code, in the fifth book of the penal code. It appears that it was impossible to enumerate the entirety of the offenses extant and active in French law, but their numbers are estimated at 10,000.

This impossibility to know the exact contours of criminal law has led legislators to attenuate the fiction of knowledge of law by the introduction of error of law as a cause of non-responsibility. Article 122-3 of the penal code provides for the non-responsibility of a person who can prove having believed, by an error of law he could not avoid, that he could legitimately carry out the action in question. It is not so much a matter of proving one's ignorance of criminal law as it is of proving one's belief in the legality of the action in question.

The Court of Cassation has applied this cause of non-responsibility in a very restricted manner, finding for example that the error on the scope of a court decision caused by the legal counsel of the party is not necessarily an invincible defense, since the judge could be asked to interpret it (Crim. 11 octobre 1995). It has equally found that a company which had expanded its market after a (ministériel) indicated that it did not need an authorization had not committed an invincible error, because it could have consulted qualified jurists (Crim. 19 mars 1997). It later formulated the principle that simple advice from a law professional does not constitute an error of law (Crim. 7 janvier 2004).

The court has accepted the non-responsibility of a head of an enterprise who merely applies a collective bargaining agreement signed under the aegis of a mediator designated by the government (Crim. 24 novembre 1998).

This cause of non-responsibility is used more widely by lower courts, generally censured by the Court of cassation, due to equity concerns. For example, the Paris Court of Appeals held that the mismatch between the case law of the business and criminal chambers of the Court of cassation as to the legality of the documents photocopied by employees in order to produce them in justice had led the employee to an error of law preventing a guilty verdict for theft (CA Paris, 9 novembre 2000, Crim.11 mai 2004).

Beyond these three subjective causes of non-responsibility, immunities exist that stem from the personal qualities of the defendant, such as the application of Article 311-12 of the Code pénal, immunity of spouses, ascendants and descendants in matters of theft. Such immunities are personal causes of non-responsibility which do not apply to the accomplice or to the corporation; they are nonetheless not the same as a lack of moral elements and in this they approach the objective causes of non-responsibility.

==== Mental disturbance or dementia ====
Article 122-1 of the Code pénal says that a person "afflicted at the moment in question by a psychic or neuropsychic disturbance that abolishes his discernment or his control of his actions" will not be found criminally responsible.

Depending on the moment when the psychic or neuropsychic trouble declared itself, the person's charges could be dismissed by the French, or receive an acquittal or not-guilty verdict in the trial court. If the person is considered a danger to society because of his mental disturbance, he can be committed to a mental institution. The prefect (préfet) decides what to do with the person in this case.

== Criminal responsibility of French politicians ==
=== Parliamentarians ===
In France, deputies and senators have parliamentary immunity which comes down to non-responsibility (fundamental immunity) and inviolability (immunity of procedure).

=== Local elected officials ===
Local elected officials in 1974 gained a jurisdictional privilege, notably prefects and magistrates. Instituted following the 5/7 dance hall fire and the subsequent sentencing of then-mayor of Saint-Laurent-du-Pont, which made a powerful impression on the political class. This privilege allowed the investigation of crimes and misdemeanors of elected officials in another jurisdiction than their own, to avoid any partiality on the part of the judge, and was abolished with the reform of the penal code in 1993.

The implementation of decentralization has led to significant growth in 20-some years of the body of standards (more than 5,000 texts spread through 18 Codes) to which elected officials are subject, sometimes without having the means, especially in small municipalities, of applying them in practice. The areas of urban design, the environment, and the security of the financial markets are so many "infraction niches". Also, legislators have created unintentional misdemeanors, a straying from the principle that says "there is no crime of offence without the intention of committing it" (art. 121-3 of penal code). Finally, in the context of an economic crisis and of competition between towns to attract businesses, some mayors have been brought to make perilous judicial combinations (montages).

Mayors may have felt like the "scapegoats of proximity democracy," in the words of Senator Hubert Haenel, forced to limit their initiatives. So legislation therefore attempted to better frame the phenomenon, notably with the Fauchon law of July 10, 2000, on unintended misdemeanors (…). Deputy Étienne Mourrut introduced a law concerning the criminal liability of elected local officials in sports or cultural demonstrations.

==== Example investigations of criminal responsibility of local elected officials ====
- 1970 : 5/7 dancehall fire in Saint-Laurent-du-Pont
- 1991 : fall of a portico basket in Saint-Denis
- 1991 : fire at Barbotan-les-Thermes
- 1992 : floods in Vaison-la-Romaine
- 1995 : drownings in the Drac river
- 2012 : accident during a bandido in Grau-du-Roi.

== See also ==
- Glossary of French criminal law

== Works cited ==
- République française; Secrétariat général du gouvernement (19 October 2022). "Légifrance Le service public de la diffusion du droit" [The public service for dissemination of the law]. Légifrance. Direction de l'information légale et administrative. ISSN 2270-8987. OCLC 867599055.
