= François Pillet =

French lawyer and politician (born 1950)

Member of the Constitutional Council
- Incumbent
- Assumed office 12 March 2019
- Appointed by: Gérard Larcher
- President: Laurent Fabius
- Preceded by: Jean-Jacques Hyest

Senator for Cher
- In office 2007–2019
- Succeeded by: Marie-Pierre Richer

General councillor of Cher
- In office 27 March 1998 – 17 December 2007
- Preceded by: Jean Manceau
- Succeeded by: Armand Koszek
- Constituency: Canton of Mehun-sur-Yèvre

Mayor of Mehun-sur-Yèvre
- In office 23 June 1995 – 4 April 2014
- Preceded by: Jean Manceau
- Succeeded by: Jean-Louis Salak

Personal details
- Born: 13 May 1950 (age 75) Bourges, France
- Party: The Republicans
- Profession: Lawyer

François Pillet (born 13 May 1950) is a French lawyer and politician who has served as a member of the Constitutional Council since 2019. Pillet was previously senator for the department of Cher from 2007 to 2019. He is a member of The Republicans.

== Early life and professional career ==
Pillet was born on 13 May 1950 in Bourges, France and worked as a lawyer before entering politics. He served as the president of the bar association of Bourges from 1996 to 1997, in which position he wrote a book on taxation procedures titled the Practical Guide to Tax Litigation Procedures (Guide pratique de la procédure dans le contentieux fiscal).

== Political career ==
From 1998 to 2007, Pillet represented the Canton of Mehun-sur-Yèvre on the general council of Cher. He served concurrently as the mayor of Mehun-sur-Yèvre from 1998 to 2014. On 17 December 2007, Pillet became senator for the department of Cher after the death of his predecessor, Serge Vinçon. Pillet was re-elected on 21 December 2008 and joined the Union for a Popular Movement parliamentary group as well as its successor, The Republicans group.

As senator, Pillet served as the vice-president of the Law Committee and became the president of the Ethics Committee in 2015. In 2011, Pillet was one of the main opponents of the gathering of biometric information on the French population, arguing: "The size of this database, which could, if it had existed for years, contain 45 million people, should be very concerning to us. No other catalogue of this type and scale currently exists. It constitutes what I would call 'the catalogue of honest people.'"

Pillet endorsed François Fillon in The Republicans' 2016 presidential primary.

In 2019, Pillet was appointed to the Constitutional Council on the advice of the president of the Senate, Gérard Larcher. Pillet took office on 12 March 2019, replacing Jean-Jacques Hyest.
