= Dominique Schnapper =

French sociologist

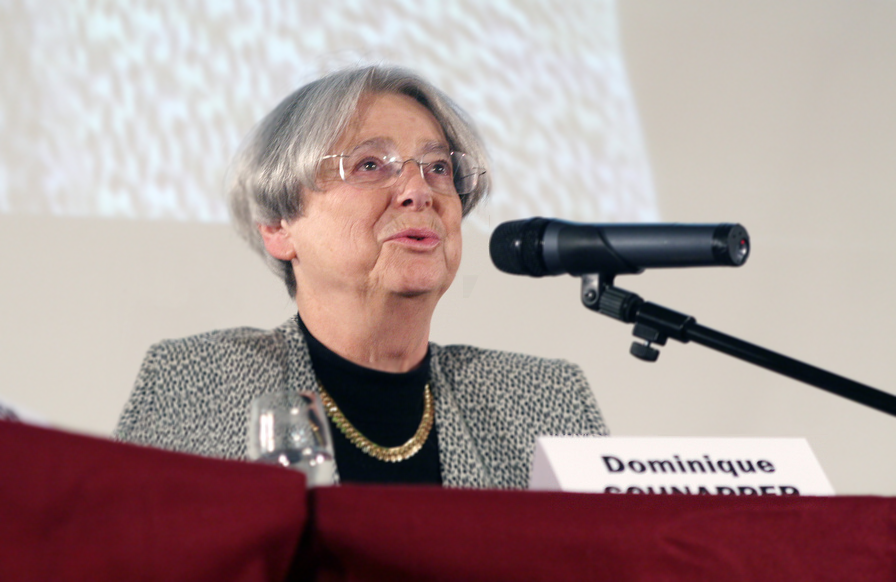
- Dominique Schnapper at a round table in 2011

Member of the Constitutional Council
- In office 12 March 2001 – 12 March 2010
- Appointed by: Christian Poncelet
- President: Yves Guéna; Pierre Mazeaud; Jean-Louis Debré
- Preceded by: Alain Lancelot
- Succeeded by: Hubert Haenel

Personal details
- Born: Dominique Aron; 9 November 1934 (age 91) Paris, France
- Spouse: Antoine Schnapper
- Children: 3
- Parent: Raymond Aron
- Education: Sciences Po

Dominique Schnapper (born 9 November 1934) was a member of the Constitutional Council of France from 2001 to 2010.

She is also a scholar and professor of sociology. Her sociological studies have been largely historical and have ranged from inquiries into minorities and labour to others on citizenship and nations. She has been named a Chevalier of the Legion of Honour, and an Officer of the Ordre des Arts et des Lettres.

She is the daughter of the French intellectual Raymond Aron.
