= Jean-Jacques Hyest =

French politician

Member of the Constitutional Council
- In office 12 October 2015 – 11 March 2019
- Appointed by: Gérard Larcher
- President: Jean-Louis Debré; Laurent Fabius
- Preceded by: Hubert Haenel
- Succeeded by: François Pillet

Member of the French Senate for Seine-et-Marne
- In office 1995–2015

Personal details
- Born: 2 March 1943 (age 83) Fontainebleau, France
- Party: The Republicans

Jean-Jacques Hyest (born 2 March 1943) is a former member of the Senate of France, who represented the Seine-et-Marne department. He is a member of the Union for a Popular Movement.

== Biography ==
A local government administrator by profession, he headed the Seine-et-Marne General Council, then was elected Departmental council (France) for the canton of Château-Landon in 1982, before becoming mayor of La Madeleine-sur-Loing in 1985 and deputy for Seine-et-Marne in 1986. He was also president of the Departmental Council of Seine-et-Marne.

He was elected senator for List of senators of Seine-et-Marne on September 24, 1995, September 26, 2004, and September 25, 2011. At the Palais du Luxembourg, he was a member of the UMP group and chaired the Law Commission from 2004 to 2011. In May 2011, he raised an objection of inadmissibility to a bill aimed at punishing those who deny the Armenian genocide, citing a risk of unconstitutionality.

On September 17, 2015, Senate President Gérard Larcher nominated him to the Constitutional Council to complete the term of Hubert Haenel, who had died while in office. His term ends in 2019.

== Bibliography ==
- Page on the Senate website
