= Antoine Schnapper =

- Born: 10 July 1933; Paris, France
- Died: 29 August 2004 (aged 71); Paris, France
- Occupation: Art historian
- Spouse: Dominique Schnapper

Antoine Schnapper (10 July 1933 – 29 August 2004) was a French art historian on art of the 17th and the 18th century. A student of André Chastel, he organised many retrospectives on artists of that period, notably one at the Louvre in 1989 on Jacques-Louis David to commemorate the bicentenary of the French Revolution. He taught at the Paris-Sorbonne University.

== Selected works ==
- Jean Jouvenet (1644-1717) et la peinture d'histoire à Paris, nouvelle édition complétée par Christine Gouzi, Arthena, 2010 (ISBN 978-2-903239-42-8).
- Le métier de peintre au grand siècle; Paris : Gallimard, 2004. OCLC 56821323
- Collections et collectionneurs dans la France du XVIIe siècle; Paris : Flammarion, 1988. OCLC 19331396
- David témoin de son temps, Office du Livre, Fribourg, 1980 ISBN 2-85047-000-7 Reference
- Tableaux pour le Trianon de marbre 1688-1714.; Paris, La Haye, Mouton, 1967. OCLC 2323606
- Jean Jouvenet, 1644-1717.; Rouen. Musée des beaux arts, 1966. OCLC 2906632

== Bibliography ==
- Necrologies - Antoine Schnapper (1933-2004); Pierre Rosenberg; Revue de l'art. no. 146, (2004): 101. OCLC 97854301
