= Hélène Lipietz =

French politician

Member of the French Senate for Seine-et-Marne
- In office 7 August 2017 – 1 October 2017
- Preceded by: Nicole Bricq
- In office 17 June 2012 – 2 May 2014
- Preceded by: Nicole Bricq
- Succeeded by: Nicole Bricq

Personal details
- Born: 7 May 1958 (age 68) Paris, France
- Party: Europe Ecology - The Greens
- Relatives: Alain Lipietz (brother)
- Education: Paris Nanterre University
- Profession: Lawyer

Hélène Lipietz (born 7 May 1958) is a French politician. She serves as a Senator for Seine-et-Marne.

== Biography ==
=== Early life ===
Hélène Lipietz was born on 7 May 1958 in Paris. Her father, Georges Lipietz (1922-2003), was a Jewish Polish immigrants in France, who was arrested and interned during World War II. Her brother is Alain Lipietz, also a green politician. She graduated from Paris West University Nanterre La Défense, where she received a law degree.

=== Career ===
She is a lawyer.

She is a member of Europe Ecology – The Greens. From 2004 to 2010, she served on the regional council of Île-de-France. Since 17 June 2012 she has served as a Senator for Seine-et-Marne, replacing Nicole Bricq.

=== Personal life ===
She is married, and has three children.
