= Hubert Haenel =

French politician

Member of the Constitutional Council
- In office 12 March 2010 – 10 August 2015
- Appointed by: Gérard Larcher
- President: Jean-Louis Debré
- Preceded by: Dominique Schnapper
- Succeeded by: Jean-Jacques Hyest

Member of the French Senate for Haut-Rhin
- In office 2 October 1986 – 6 March 2010

Personal details
- Born: 20 May 1942 Pompey, France
- Died: 10 August 2015 (aged 73) Paris, France
- Education: French National School for the Judiciary

Hubert Haenel (20 May 1942 – 10 August 2015) was a French politician and a member of the Senate of France. He represented the Haut-Rhin department and was a member of the Union for a Popular Movement Party.

On 24 February 2010 he was nominated to the Constitutional Council of France by the President of the French Senate Gérard Larcher.

Legal offices
Preceded by Dominique Schnapper	Member of the Constitutional Council; 2010–2015	Succeeded by Jean-Jacques Hyest
