= Flaman Speed Indicator and Recorder =

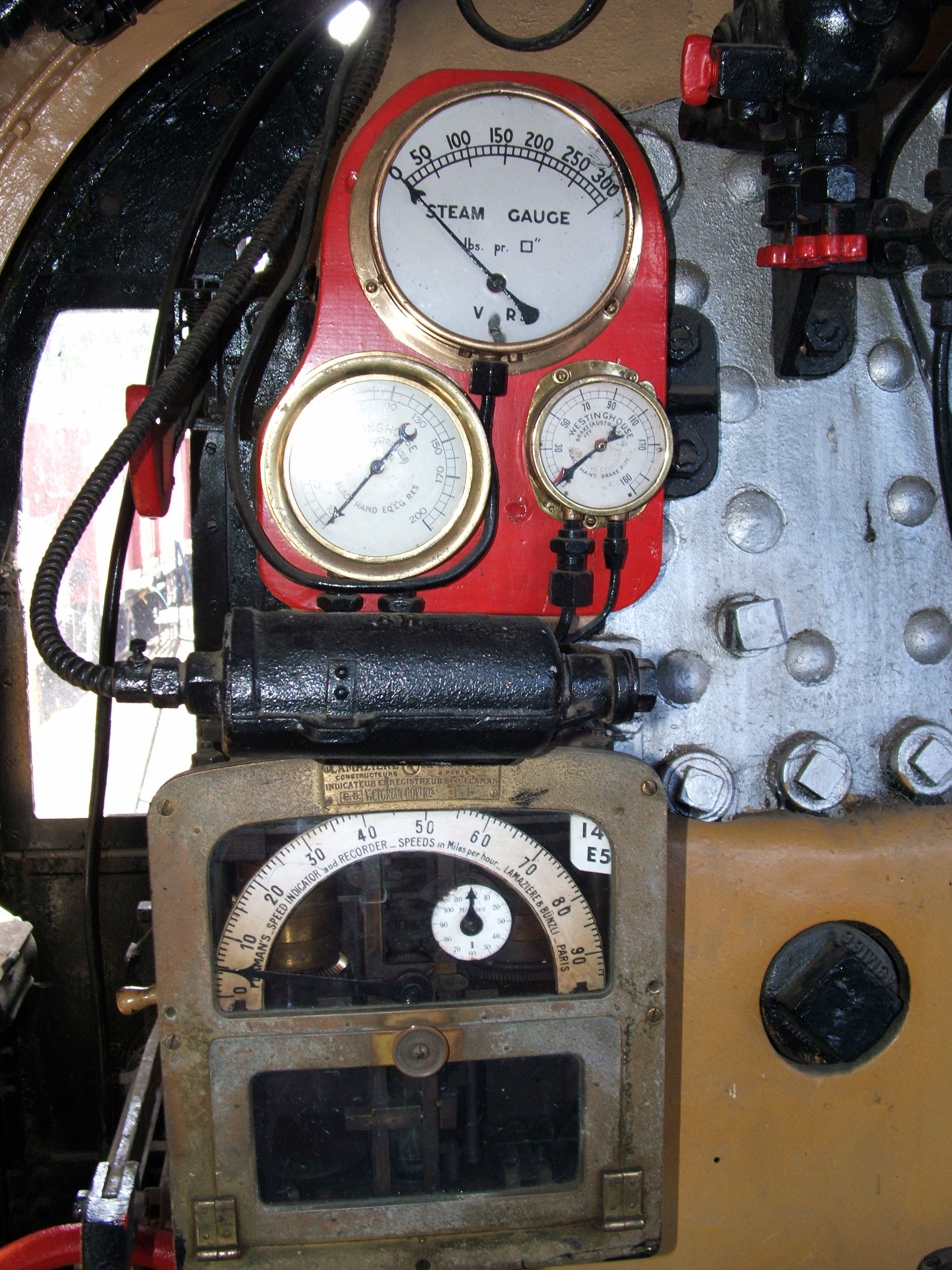
Driver's view of instruments in Victorian Railways H class locomotive H 220, with the Flaman Speed Indicator and Recorder visible at bottom.

The Flaman Speed Indicator and Recorder was a device patented in 1901 by Nicolas Charles Eugène Flaman of France for indicating the current speed of a vehicle (for example a railway locomotive) and recording it on a paper tape that could be unrolled and examined at the end of a run to provide evidence of the speeds attained on the journey.

== Design features ==
The paper tape recording was driven directly by the wheels of the locomotive, with the paper spool moving at a fixed rate per kilometre travelled. Three graphs were recorded, the first being time elapsed (with the trace moving vertically if the train was stationary), the second being a speed curve. and the third recording the driver's attentiveness to signals ("Vigilance") by marking one tick above a line when the driver depressed a button, and another below the line when the engine went over the signal ramp.

== Data recorded ==
Read together, it was possible to determine exactly what speed the locomotive had been travelling at any point in time or distance. As well as allowing study of locomotive performance, it also allowed greater scrutiny of the observance of the driver of speed restrictions along the line and attentiveness to signals. It was practice on some railways such as the Victorian Railways in Australia for the driver to sign the speed chart prior to departure.

== Users ==
The Flaman recorder was used in a number of countries, and in particular France on the Nord, Est, PLM and Etat railways. By 1914 about 80% of French locomotives were equipped with a speed recorder.
