= Portrait of Madame Marie-Louise Trudaine =

Unfinished painting by Jacques-Louis David

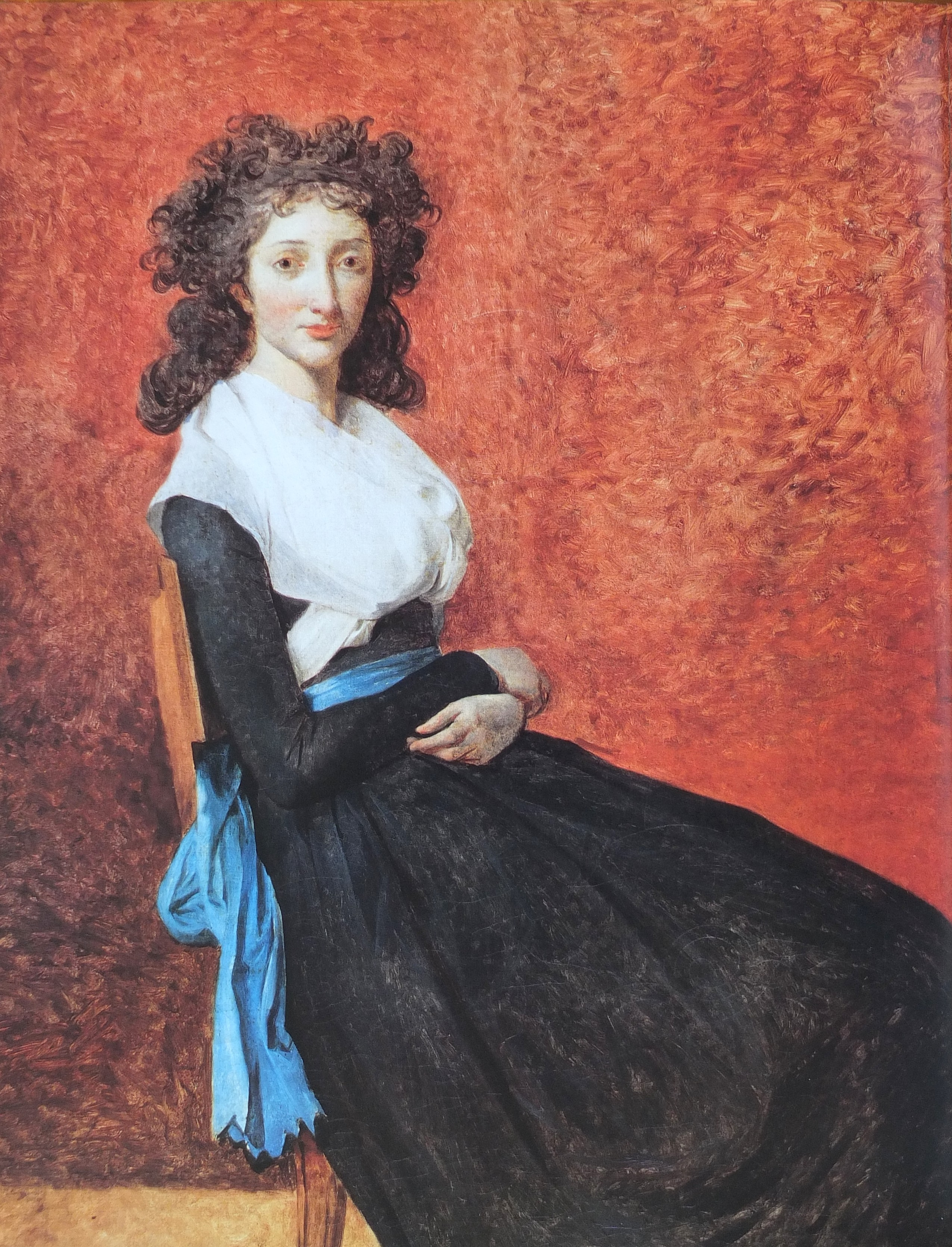
- Artist: Jacques-Louis David
- Year: 1791–1792
- Medium: Oil on canvas
- Dimensions: 130 cm × 98 cm (51 in × 39 in)
- Location: Louvre; Paris

The Portrait of Madame Marie-Louise Trudaine is an unfinished 1791–1792 portrait of Marie-Louise Trudaine by the French painter Jacques-Louis David. It was commissioned from David by her brothers-in-law, the Trudaine brothers, members of a family that had provided France with major civil servants such as Daniel-Charles Trudaine since the 17th century. The brothers welcomed David, the poet André Chénier, and other major artists of the time to their Parisian salon at place des Vosges. David became radicalized at the time of the French Revolution in 1792, was elected a deputy to the National Convention, and became an extremist—unlike the Trudaine family, who opted for obscurity.

The portrait of Madame Trudaine is an oil on canvas that shows her seated on a simple chaise, with her hands crossed on her lap and wearing a sober dress, a blue waist-sash and a white collar. Her expression is worried and reinforced by the tormented background and her unkempt hair. David left the portrait unfinished. It was acquired by the Louvre in 1890.

== See also ==
- List of paintings by Jacques-Louis David
