= Val-d'Oise's 10th constituency =

Constituency of the French Fifth Republic

10th constituency of Val-d'Oise
- inline Constituency of the National Assembly of France

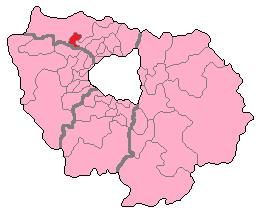
- Val-d'Oise's 10th Constituency shown within Île-de-France
- Deputy: Aurélien Taché; LFI
- Department: Val-d'Oise
- Cantons: Cergy-Nord - l'Hautil (part)
- Registered voters: 66,540

The 10th constituency of Val-d'Oise is a French legislative constituency in the Val-d'Oise département. It is currently represented by Aurélien Taché, who was elected as a member of La République En Marche! (LREM), but left it and joined the new Ecology Democracy Solidarity group in 2020.

== Description ==
The 10th constituency of Val-d'Oise is a new seat created as a result of the 2010 redistricting of French legislative constituencies, which awarded the department with one additional seat. The constituency was created by taking two cantons from the old 2nd constituency of Val-d'Oise.

== Historic Representation ==
Election	Member	Party
2012	Dominique Lefebvre	PS
2017	Aurélien Taché	LREM
2020	Aurélien Taché	EDS
2020	Aurélien Taché	LND
2022	Aurélien Taché	LND

== Election results ==
=== 2024 ===
Candidate	Party	Alliance	First round			Second round		
Candidate	Party	Alliance	Votes	%	+/–	Votes	%	+/–
Aurélien Taché	LFI	NFP	18,306	43.13	+8.35	26,852	69.62	
Lisbeth Macé	RN		9,667	22.78	+8.51	11,716	30.38	
Sonia Krimi	RE	ENS	8,129	19.15	-4.31			
Edwina Étoré-Manika	LR		4,249	10.01	+4.09			
Albert Saint-Jean	DIV		1,107	2.61	N/A			
Christophe Flaux	LO		489	1.15	+0.42			
Souade de la Faye	DIV		488	1.15	N/A			
Jean Caillot	DIV		7	0.02	N/A			
Valid votes			42,442	97.38	-0.11	38,568	90.22	
Blank votes			906	2.08	+0.06	3,583	8.38	
Null votes			237	0.54	+0.05	599	1.40	
Turnout			43,585	65.27	+23.02	42,750	63.99	
Abstentions			23,188	34.73	-23.02	24,056	36.01	
Registered voters			66,773			66,806		
Source: Ministry of the Interior, Le Monde
Result						LFI HOLD		

=== 2022 ===
Legislative Election 2022: Val-d'Oise's 10th constituency
Party	Candidate	Votes	%	±%
LND (NUPÉS)	Aurélien Taché	9,193	32.85	+0.83
LREM (Ensemble)	Victorien Lachas	6,565	23.46	-13.26
RN	Richard Durand	3,993	14.27	+3.90
DVG	Karim Ziabat	2,109	7.54	N/A
LR (UDC)	Paticia José	1,656	5.92	−6.21
DVG	Sanaa Saitouli	838	2.99	N/A
REC	Princesse Granvorka Puisard	769	2.75	N/A
DVE	Evelyne Ollivier	564	2.02	N/A
Others	N/A	2,297		
Turnout		28,705	42.25	−0.79
2nd round result
LND (NUPÉS)	Aurélien Taché	14,636	55.76	+14.77
LREM (Ensemble)	Victorien Lachas	11,613	44.24	−14.77
Turnout		26,249	41.22	+4.61
LND gain from LREM				

=== 2017 ===
Candidate	Label	First round		Second round	
Candidate	Label	Votes	%	Votes	%
Aurélien Taché	REM	10,279	36.72	13,275	59.01
Katia Noin Ledanois	FI	4,037	14.42	9,221	40.99
Virginie Tinland	LR	3,397	12.13		
Dominique Lefebvre	PS	3,263	11.66		
Anne Cloutier	FN	2,902	10.37		
Dominique Damour	ECO	1,184	4.23		
Rida Boultame	DIV	635	2.27		
Maxime Loubar	DIV	616	2.20		
Françoise Courtin	PCF	478	1.71		
Jean-François Wyss	DIV	326	1.16		
Éric Cassan	EXG	233	0.83		
François Lefebvre des Noëttes	EXG	225	0.80		
Flore Davesne	DIV	184	0.66		
Sylvain de Smet	DVG	183	0.65		
Viki Mittoo	ECO	41	0.15		
Jean-Christophe Loza	DVD	12	0.04		
Votes		27,995	100.00	22,496	100.00
Valid votes		27,995	97.76	22,496	92.34
Blank votes		514	1.79	1,438	5.90
Null votes		128	0.45	429	1.76
Turnout		28,637	43.04	24,363	36.61
Abstentions		37,903	56.96	42,177	63.39
Registered voters		66,540		66,540	
Source: Ministry of the Interior

=== 2012 ===
Legislative Election 2012: Val-d'Oise's 10th constituency
Party	Candidate	Votes	%	±%
PS	Dominique Lefebvre	14,083	44.10	
UMP	Audrey Tamborini	7,785	24.38	
FN	Thérésa Andres	3,679	11.52	
EELV	Bernard Morin	2,564	8.03	
FG	Patrick Diaz	1,901	5.95	
MoDem	Olivier Sellier	666	2.09	
Others	N/A	1,353		
Turnout		31,931	50.82	
2nd round result
PS	Dominique Lefebvre	19,011	62.04	
UMP	Audrey Tamborini	11,630	37.96	
Turnout		30,641	48.77	
PS hold				

== Sources ==
Official results of French elections from 2002: "Résultats électoraux officiels en France" (in French).
