= Alpes-de-Haute-Provence's 1st constituency =

Constituency of the National Assembly of France

1st constituency of Alpes-de-Haute-Provence
- inline Constituency of the National Assembly of France

- Map of the constituency in the department

- Alpes-de-Haute-Provence in metropolitan France
- Deputy: Christian Girard; RN
- Department: Alpes-de-Haute-Provence
- Cantons: Castellane, Château-Arnoux-Saint-Auban, Digne-les-Bains-1, Digne-les-Bains-2, Forcalquier, Oraison, Riez, Seyne, Valensole
- Registered voters: 78,079

The 1st constituency of Alpes-de-Haute-Provence is a French legislative constituency in the southeastern Alpes-de-Haute-Provence department. Like all constituencies, it elects one deputy via the two-round voting system.

The current deputy, Christian Girard, of the National Rally (RN), unseated outgoing deputy Delphine Bagarry in 2022, who was elected as a member of La République En Marche! (LREM) in 2017, but in May 2020 was one of the 17 initial members of the Ecology Democracy Solidarity (EDS) group in the National Assembly.

== List of deputies ==
Election	Member	Party	Vote in the 2nd round	Runner-up
1958	Roger Diet	UNR	39.9% (Note: With a third candidate.)	RRRS
1962	Marcel Massot	RRRS	63.2%	UNR
1967	Marcel Massot	RRRS	60.6%	UDR
1968	Marcel Massot	RRRS	50%	UDR
1973	Marcel Massot	PRG	54.1%	UDR
1978	François Massot	PRG	51.1%	RPR
1981	François Massot	PRG	60%	RPR
1986	Proportional representation by department			
1988	François Massot	PS	54.1%	UDF
1993	Pierre Rinaldi	RPR	53.6%	PS
1994 (Note: By-election triggered by the nullification of the 1993 results by the Constitutional Council.)	Francis Galizi	UDF	52.9%	PS
1997	Jean-Louis Bianco	PS	52.4%	UDF
2002	Jean-Louis Bianco	PS	50.7%	UMP
2007	Jean-Louis Bianco	PS	52.3%	UMP
2012	Gilbert Sauvan	PS	58.6%	UMP
2017	Delphine Bagarry	LREM	63.6%	FN
2020	Delphine Bagarry	LND		
2022	Christian Girard	RN	51.2%	LND
2024	Christian Girard	RN	45.81%	The Ecologists

== Election results ==
=== 2024 ===
Candidate	Party	Alliance	First round		Second round	
Candidate	Party	Alliance	Votes	%	Votes	%
Christian Girard	RN		18,616	44.30	21,536	54.19
Félix Blanc	LE	NFP	11,457	27.26	18,206	45.81
Benoit Gauvan	REN	Ensemble	8,132	19.35		
Sandra Raponi	LR		2,956	7.03		
Patricia Campart	REC		468	1.11		
Annabel Ros	LO		396	0.94		
Nadia Lakhlef Tsalamlal	UDI		1	0.00		
Valid votes			42,026	97.10	39,742	91.34
Blank votes			875	2.02	2,804	6.44
Null votes			378	0.87	964	2.22
Turnout			43,279	70.40	43,510	70.78
Abstentions			18,194	29.60	17,962	29.22
Registered voters			61,473		61,472	
Result			RN HOLD			

=== 2022 ===
2022 legislative election: Alpes-de-Haute-Provence's 1st constituency
Party	Candidate	Votes	%	±%
RN	Christian Girard	8,912	28.52	+10.82
LND (NUPÉS)	Delphine Bagarry	8,744	27.99	+2.47
LREM (Ensemble)	Paul Audan	7,008	22.43	−11.79
REC	Laurine Miffred	1,728	5.53	N/A
PS	Sylvie Lyons (diss.)	1,249	4.00	N/A
DVE	Nicola Van Heesbeke	772	2.47	N/A
DLF (UPF)	Romaric Giacomino	749	2.40	N/A
Others	N/A	2,083	6.67	
Turnout		31,245	51.89	−0.62
2nd round result
RN	Christian Girard	14,791	51.19	+14.79
LND (NUPÉS)	Delphine Bagarry	14,102	48.81	N/A
Turnout		28,893	52.45	+6.59
RN gain from LREM				

=== 2017 ===
Candidate	Label	First round		Second round	
Candidate	Label	Votes	%	Votes	%
Delphine Bagarry	LREM	10,640	34.22	15,609	63.60
Odile Brun	FN	5,502	17.70	8,933	36.40
Emmanuelle Gaziello	LFI	4,736	15.23		
Brigitte Beaumeyer	UDI	2,295	7.38		
Colette Charriau	EELV	1,621	5.21		
Gérard Esmiol	PCF	1,580	5.08		
Marie-Anne Baudoui-Maurel	DLF	1,299	4.18		
Bruno Bourjac	DVD	1,225	3.94		
Florence Viti-Bertin	PRG	861	2.77		
Bruno Potie	DIV	568	1.83		
Jonathan Barbarin	ECO	401	1.29		
Claire Bouvier	DIV	227	0.73		
Catherine Zaparty	EXG	137	0.44		
Votes		31,092	100.00	24,542	100.00
Valid votes		31,092	96.84	24,542	87.54
Blank votes		698	2.17	2,531	9.03
Null votes		315	0.98	962	3.43
Turnout		32,105	52.51	28,035	45.86
Abstentions		29,038	47.49	33,103	54.14
Registered voters		61,143		61,138	
Source: Ministry of the Interior

=== 2012 ===
Summary of the 10 and 17 June 2012 legislative election in Alpes-de-Haute-Provence's 1st constituency
Candidate	Party		1st round		2nd round	
Candidate	Party		Votes	%	Votes	%
Gilbert Sauvan	Socialist Party	PS	12,286	33.04%	20,785	58.60%
Éliane Barreille	Union for a Popular Movement	UMP	8,804	23.68%	14,684	41.40%
Ghislaine Aubert	National Front	FN	6,160	16.57%		
Jean-Louis Pin	Left Front	FG	3,654	9.83%		
Gérard de Meester	Europe Ecology – The Greens	EELV	3,014	8.11%		
Marie-Anne Baudoui-Maurel	Miscellaneous right	DVD	1,187	3.19%		
Daniel Ragolski	Ecologist	ECO	693	1.86%		
Frédéric Santiago		CEN	565	1.52%		
Hubert Cabassut	Miscellaneous left	DVG	279	0.75%		
Caroline Alonso	Far-left	EXG	192	0.52%		
Joëlle Tebar		NCE	180	0.48%		
Mireille Carle	Far-left	EXG	170	0.46%		
Ludivine Evano	Miscellaneous right	DVD	0	0.00%		
Total			37,184	100%	35,469	100%
Registered voters			60,582		60,572	
Blank/void ballots			717	1.89%	1,882	5.04%
Turnout			37,901	62.56%	37,351	61.66%
Abstentions			22,681	37.44%	23,221	38.34%
Result					PS hold	

=== 2007 ===
Summary of the 10 and 17 June 2007 legislative election in Alpes-de-Haute-Provence's 1st constituency
Candidate	Party		1st round		2nd round	
Candidate	Party		Votes	%	Votes	%
Jean-Louis Bianco	Socialist Party	PS	13,902	36.40%	20,791	52.33%
Éliane Barreille	Union for a Popular Movement	UMP	14,745	38.60%	18,938	47.67%
Joëlle Tebar	Democratic Movement	MoDem	1,841	4.82%		
Mireille Jouzier-Berges	National Front	FN	1,600	4.19%		
Aurore Hernandez	Communist	COM	1,304	3.41%		
Martine Vallon	The Greens	VEC	1,272	3.33%		
Venise Lafon	Far-left	EXG	856	2.24%		
Monique Daniel	Hunting, Fishing, Nature, Traditions	CPNT	716	1.87%		
Jean-Claude Silvy	Movement for France	MPF	543	1.42%		
Marie-France Lorenzelli	Ecologist	ECO	397	1.04%		
Micheline Panisse	Far-right	EXD	260	0.68%		
Caroline Alonso	Far-left	EXG	251	0.66%		
Bernard Jeanselme	Far-left	EXG	165	0.43%		
Catherine Piechota	Divers	DIV	153	0.40%		
Noël Chuisano	Miscellaneous right	DVD	109	0.29%		
Jean Milanovic	Divers	DIV	83	0.22%		
Total			38,197	100%	39,729	100%
Registered voters			58,493		58,494	
Blank/Void ballots			754	1.94%	1,200	2.93%
Turnout			38,951	66.59%	40,929	69.97%
Abstentions			19,542	33.41%	17,565	30.03%
Result					PS hold	

=== 2002 ===
2002 legislative election: Alpes-de-Haute-Provence's 1st constituency
Party	Candidate	Votes	%	±%
PS	Jean-Louis Bianco	11,994	33.78	
UMP	Francis Galizi	10,603	29.86	
FN	Michele Signoret	4,322	12.17	
PR	José Escanez	2,031	5.72	
CPNT	Christian Jauffret	1,398	3.94	
LV	Philippe Berrod	1,233	3.47	
UDF	Joëlle Tebar	943	2.66	
Others	N/A	2,981		
Turnout		36,443	67.79	
2nd round result
PS	Jean-Louis Bianco	16,907	50.79	
UMP	Francis Galizi	16,379	49.21	
Turnout		35,159	65.40	
PS hold				

=== 1997 ===
1997 legislative election: Alpes-de-Haute-Provence's 1st constituency
Party	Candidate	Votes	%	±%
PS	Jean-Louis Bianco	10,200	30.85	
UDF	Francis Galizi	10,043	30.38	
FN	Bernard Naegellen	4,756	14.38	
PCF	Paul Gérard	4,158	12.58	
MEI	Pierre-Alain Cambefort	1,747	5.28	
GE	Brigitte Cirgue	852	2.58	
MPF	Roger Espic	785	2.37	
Others	N/A	522		
Turnout		34,897	69.22	
2nd round result
PS	Jean-Louis Bianco	18,671	52.47	
UDF	Francis Galizi	16,914	47.53	
Turnout		38,006	75.40	
PS gain from UDF				

== See also ==
- List of deputies from Alpes-de-Haute-Provence
- Alpes-de-Haute-Provence's 2nd constituency
