= List of deputies from Alpes-de-Haute-Provence =

The French department of Alpes-de-Haute-Provence (04) is divided into two constituencies, each of which sends one deputy to the National Assembly of France. In the XIII legislature, these are represented by Jean-Louis Bianco and Daniel Spagnou. As at 2020, a total of 12 different deputies have represented Alpes-de-Haute-Provence since single member constituencies were re-introduced in 1988.

	First		Second'	
	Member	Party	Member	Party
1958	Roger Diet	UNR	Gabriel Domenech	UNR
1962	Claude Delorme	SFIO	Marcel Massot	Radical
1967	Claude Delorme	SFIO	Marcel Massot	Radical
1968	Claude Delorme	SFIO	Marcel Massot	Radical
1973	Claude Delorme	PS	Marcel Massot	MRG
1978	Pierre Girardot	PCF	François Massot	MRG
1981	André Bellon	PS	François Massot	MRG
	Alpes-de-Haute-Provence			
	Member	Party	Member	Party
1986	François Massot	PS	Pierre Delmar	RPR
	First		Second	
	Member	Party	Member	Party
1988	François Massot	PS	André Bellon	PS
1993	Pierre Rinaldi	RPR	Pierre Delmar	RPR
1994	Francis Galizi	UDF-CDS	Pierre Delmar	RPR
1997	Jean-Louis Bianco	PS	Robert Honde	PRG
2002	Jean-Louis Bianco	PS	Daniel Spagnou	UMP
2007	Jean-Louis Bianco	PS	Daniel Spagnou	UMP
2012	Gilbert Sauvan	PS	Christophe Castaner	PS
2017	Delphine Bagarry	LREM	Emmanuelle Fontaine-Domeizel	LREM
2020	Delphine Bagarry	EDS	Emmanuelle Fontaine-Domeizel	LREM
