= Loire-Atlantique's 7th constituency =

Constituency of the National Assembly of France

7th constituency of Loire-Atlantique
- inline Constituency of the National Assembly of France

- Constituency in Department

- Location of Loire-Atlantique in France
- Deputy: Sandrine Josso; MoDem
- Department: Loire-Atlantique
- Cantons: La Baule-Escoublac, Le Croisic, Guérande, Herbignac, Pontchâteau, Saint-Gildas-des-Bois, Saint-Nicolas-de-Redon

The 7th constituency of Loire-Atlantique is a French legislative constituency in the Loire-Atlantique département. Like the other 576 French constituencies, it elects one MP using the two-round system, with a run-off if no candidate receives over 50% of the vote in the first round.

== Historic representation ==
Election	Member	Party
1988	Olivier Guichard	RPR
1993	Olivier Guichard	RPR
1997	René Leroux	PS
2002	Christophe Priou	UMP
2007	Christophe Priou	UMP
2012	Christophe Priou	UMP
2017	Sandrine Josso	LREM
2020	Sandrine Josso	LND
2020	Sandrine Josso	MoDem
2022	Sandrine Josso	MoDem
2024	Sandrine Josso	MoDem

== Election results ==
=== 2024 ===
Candidate	Party	Alliance	First round			Second round		
Candidate	Party	Alliance	Votes	%	+/–	Votes	%	+/–
Sandrine Josso	MoDEM	Ensemble	23,489	28.49	+6.01	48,531	59.95	+2.89
Michel Hunault	LR-RN	UXD	23,210	28.15	new	32,425	40.05	new
Véronique Mahé	PCF	NFP	19,881	24.11	-0.15	withdrew		
Bertrand Plouvier	LR	UDC	11,616	14.09	+0.87			
Gaël Bourdeau	DLF		1,595	1.93	+0.29			
Sophie Corbin	REC		1,426	1.73	-3.43			
Marie-France Belin	LO		1,228	1.49	+0.21			
Votes			82,439	100.00		80,956	100.00	
Valid votes			82,439	96.35	-1.22	80,956	94.40	+2.42
Blank votes			2,478	2.90	+1.07	3,751	4.37	-1.65
Null votes			646	0.75	+0.15	1,052	1.23	-0.77
Turnout			85,563	71.93	+20.98	85,759	72.09	+21.63
Abstentions			33,383	28.07	-20.98	33,203	27.91	-21.63
Registered voters			118,946			118,962		
Result			MoDEM HOLD					

=== 2022 ===
Legislative Election 2022: Loire-Atlantique's 7th constituency
Party	Candidate	Votes	%	±%
PCF (NUPÉS)	Veronique Mahe	14,147	24.26	+2.98
MoDem (Ensemble)	Sandrine Josso	13,108	22.48	-20.44
RN	Laurence Le Page	9,309	15.96	+7.36
LR (UDC)	Bertrand Plouvier	7,712	13.22	−7.45
LREM	Jean-Yves Gontier*	5,810	9.96	N/A
REC	Laurent Gaudeau	3,008	5.16	N/A
DVE	Alain Seille	1,956	3.35	N/A
Others	N/A	3,264	5.60	
Turnout		58,314	50.95	−3.11
2nd round result
MoDem (Ensemble)	Sandrine Josso	31,074	57.06	-4.05
PCF (NUPÉS)	Veronique Mahe	23,381	42.94	N/A
Turnout		54,455	50.46	+5.98
MoDem gain from LREM				

=== 2017 ===
Candidate	Label	First round		Second round	
Candidate	Label	Votes	%	Votes	%
Sandrine Josso	REM	24,615	42.92	26,377	61.11
Franck Louvrier	LR	11,852	20.67	16,787	38.89
Catherine Legal	FI	6,631	11.56		
Doris Noël	FN	4,932	8.60		
Anne Boyé	PS	2,695	4.70		
Yves Coquard	ECO	2,045	3.57		
Gaël Bourdeau	DLF	984	1.72		
Véronique Mahé	PCF	832	1.45		
Valérie Houguet	REG	824	1.44		
Arnaud Courjal	REG	655	1.14		
Paul Lachal	DVG	452	0.79		
Rémy Fancelli	DIV	442	0.77		
Marie-France Belin	EXG	387	0.67		
Votes		57,346	100.00	43,164	100.00
Valid votes		57,346	98.01	43,164	89.66
Blank votes		867	1.48	3,688	7.66
Null votes		297	0.51	1,289	2.68
Turnout		58,510	54.06	48,141	44.48
Abstentions		49,719	45.94	60,087	55.52
Registered voters		108,229		108,228	
Source: Ministry of the Interior

=== 2012 ===
Legislative Election 2012: Loire-Atlantique's 7th constituency
Party	Candidate	Votes	%	±%
UMP	Christophe Priou	25,638	41.41	
PS	Hélène Challier	22,270	35.97	
FN	Annie-Chantal Durand	6,015	9.71	
FG	Véronique Mahe	2,731	4.41	
EELV	Laurent Dubost	2,331	3.76	
MoDem	Patricia Gallerneau	1,414	2.28	
Others	N/A	1,517		
Turnout		61,916	60.66	
2nd round result
UMP	Christophe Priou	31,217	52.05	
PS	Hélène Challier	28,756	47.95	
Turnout		59,973	58.77	
UMP hold				

=== 2007 ===
Legislative Election 2007: Loire-Atlantique's 7th constituency
Party	Candidate	Votes	%	±%
UMP	Christophe Priou	33,150	49.90	
PS	Adeline L'Honen	16,377	24.65	
MoDem	Patricia Gallerneau	4,719	7.10	
LV	Alain Mazery	2,231	3.36	
PCF	Marc Justy	1,954	2.94	
CPNT	Gwenaël Rio	1,639	2.47	
Far left	Gaele Berthaud	1,599	2.41	
FN	Monique Juguet	1,396	2.10	
Others	N/A	3,373		
Turnout		67,388	63.81	
2nd round result
UMP	Christophe Priou	36,392	57.85	
PS	Adeline L'Honen	26,515	42.15	
Turnout		64,214	60.81	
UMP hold				

=== 2002 ===
Legislative Election 2002: Loire-Atlantique's 7th constituency
Party	Candidate	Votes	%	±%
UMP	Christophe Priou	27,825	44.18	
PS	Rene Leroux	21,218	33.69	
FN	Philippe Rouger	3,746	5.95	
CPNT	Claude Robert	2,550	4.05	
LV	Patricia Gallerneau	1,645	2.61	
PCF	Marc Justy	1,260	2.00	
Others	N/A	4,741		
Turnout		63,914	67.55	
2nd round result
UMP	Christophe Priou	33,654	55.75	
PS	Rene Leroux	26,716	44.25	
Turnout		61,759	65.28	
UMP gain from PS				

=== 1997 ===
Legislative Election 1997: Loire-Atlantique's 7th constituency
Party	Candidate	Votes	%	±%
PS	René Leroux	17,383	30.77	
RPR	Christophe Priou	14,677	25.98	
UDF	Yves Métaireau	6,110	10.81	
FN	Philippe Rouger	5,045	8.93	
PCF	Marc Justy	4,289	7.59	
LO	Jean-Claude Saint-Arroman	1,731	3.06	
DVD	Patrick Simon	1,563	2.77	
LV	Danièle Estay	1,535	2.72	
UDF	Philippe Levenne*	1,294	2.29	
GE	Michèle Levesque	1,219	2.16	
Others	N/A	1,655		
Turnout		59,634	69.31	
2nd round result
PS	René Leroux	29,982	50.16	
RPR	Christophe Priou	29,786	49.84	
Turnout		62,428	72.57	
PS gain from RPR				

* UDF dissident

== Sources ==
- Official results of French elections from 1998: "Résultats électoraux officiels en France" (in French). Archived from the original on 20 December 2011.
