= Sandrine Josso =

French politician (born 1975)

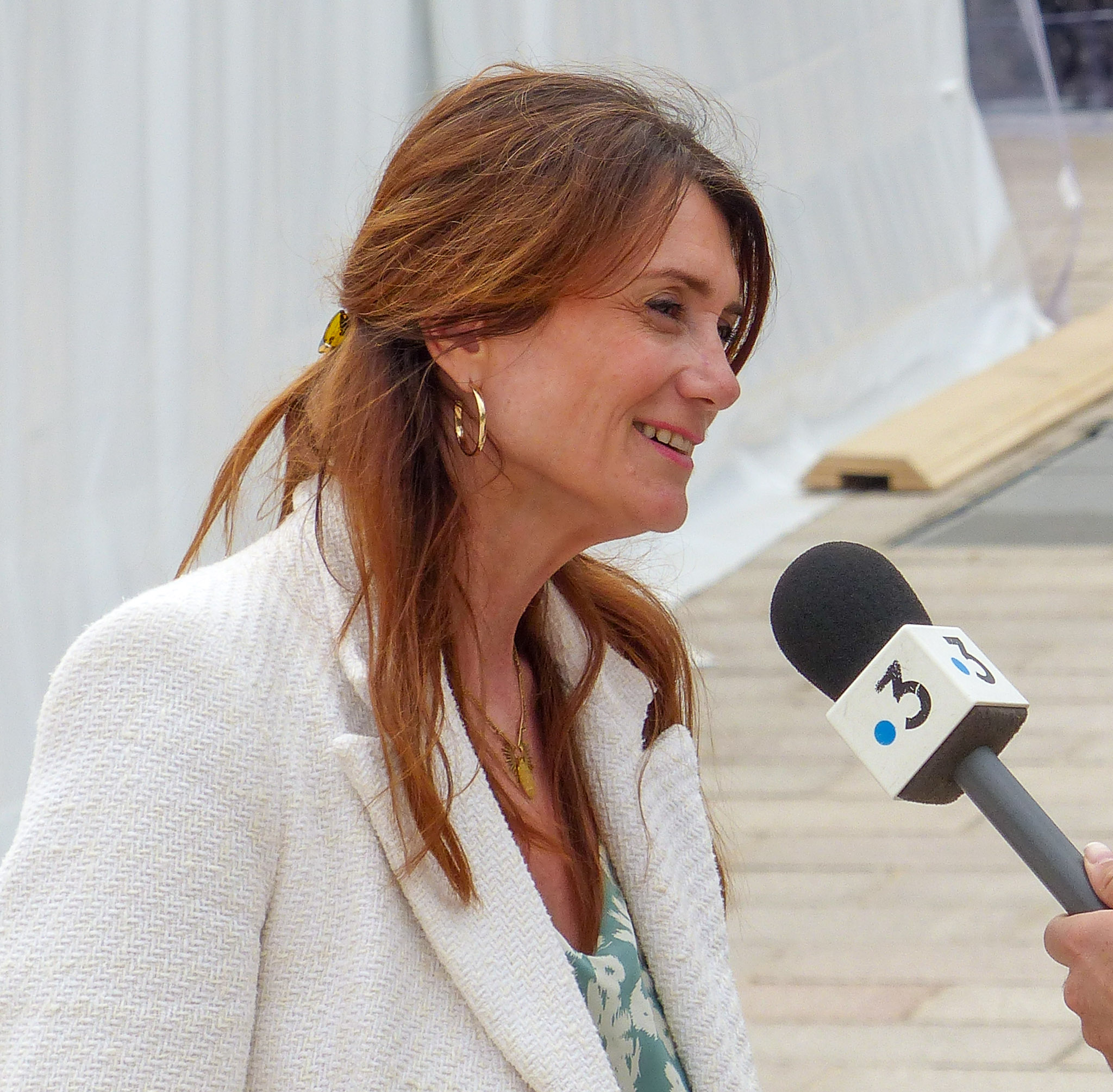

Member of the National Assembly for Loire-Atlantique's 7th constituency
- Incumbent
- Assumed office 21 June 2017
- Preceded by: Christophe Priou
- Parliamentary group: La République En Marche! (2017-2019); Liberties and Territories (2019); MoDem (2020 onwards)

Personal details
- Born: 19 September 1975 (age 50) Guérande, France

Sandrine Josso (born 19 September 1975) is a French politician who has been serving as a member of the French National Assembly since the 2017 elections, representing the department of Loire-Atlantique.

In parliament, Josso served on the Committee on Social Development and Spatial Planning from 2017 until 2019 before moving to the Committee on Cultural Affairs and Education.

From 2017 until 2019, Josso was a member of La République En Marche! (LREM) and therefore part of its parliamentary group. She quit the LREM group and joined the Liberties and Territories group in 2019. She was one of the founding members of The New Democrats in 2020. She then moved to the MoDem group in 2020.

In November 2023, Josso claimed that her drink was spiked with ecstasy by senator Joël Guerriau. After a trial, Guerriau was convicted and sentenced to four years' imprisonment in 2026.

== See also ==
- 2017 French legislative election
