= Pierre Brender =

French football manager

Personal information
- Place of birth: France

Managerial career
- Years: Team
- 1981–1996: US Saint-Malo

Pierre Brender was a French football manager who oversaw US Saint-Malo for 15 years, from 1981 until 1996.

== Sporting career ==
In late 1981, Brender was appointed as the coach of US Saint-Malo, a position that he held for 15 years, until 1996, when he was replaced by Dominique Lefebvre. Shortly after his arrival, on 20 December 1981, the amateur club Saint-Malo faced the professional second division team Stade Rennais in the Coupe de France at the Stade de Marville, and even though he was still discovering his team, he managed to lead his side to an shocking 2–1 victory, courtesy of goals from Michel Simon and Raymond Lefeuvre. According to Brender, however, this is not his best memory in the Coupe de France, citing a 1987 match against Avranches, a division above, where they took the lead three times in an eventual victory on penalties.

Initially, Brender tried to establish a professional side to the club, telling his wife that he would "either leave quickly, or settle in for the long term", and it turned out to be the latter. Under his leadership, the club achieved promotion in two consecutive years to find itself in the 3rd division in 1987, where the club remained until the end of the century, sept for a two-year stint in 1990–92, returning to the third division in 1992, partly because of the professional player Dominique Lefebvre from Dijon, who went on to replace Brender at the end of the 1995–96 season. During his time at Saint-Malo, one of his assistant coaches was Jean-Pierre Méléard, a physical education teacher.

== Later life ==
On 20 November 2021, on the occasion of the 40th anniversary of USSM's victory over Rennais, the club invited five figures from triumph, including Brender, to kick off the Ligue 2 match between USSM and Vitré.

== See also ==
- List of longest managerial reigns in association football
