= New Ecological and Social People's Union =

Political coalition in France

New Ecological and Social People's Union Nouvelle Union populaire écologique et sociale
- Abbreviation: NUPES
- Leader: Collective leadership
- Founded: 1 May 2022
- Dissolved: 10 June 2024
- Succeeded by: New Popular Front
- Political position: Left-wing
- Colours: Purple; Pink; Green; Yellow; Red

Website
- nupes-2022.fr

The New Ecological and Social People's Union (French: Nouvelle Union populaire écologique et sociale, NUPES) (Note: French pronunciation: [nypɛs], [nyp], [nyps]) was a left-wing electoral alliance of political parties in France. Formed on May Day 2022, the alliance included La France Insoumise (LFI), the Socialist Party (PS), the French Communist Party (PCF), The Ecologists (LE), Ensemble! (E!), and Génération.s (G.s), and their respective smaller partners. It was the first wide left-wing political alliance since the Plural Left in the 1997 French legislative election. Over 70 dissident candidates who refused the accord still ran.

Per a press release, the union's founding goal for the 2022 legislative election was to deny Emmanuel Macron's Ensemble Citoyens on the centre-right a presidential majority in the National Assembly, and to also defeat the French far-right. EELV and LFI signed an agreement that had the alliance won a majority of seats, they would have put forward Mélenchon as prime minister of France for a cohabitation. NUPES won the most seats outside of Ensemble, denying Macron a majority; at the same time, they underperformed expectations, only winning about 22% of the seats and 26% of the popular vote, while the far-right National Rally obtained its best result ever and became the largest parliamentary opposition group, due to NUPES being an electoral alliance.

In October 2023, the coalition's future was put in doubt when the Socialist Party voted a "moratorium" on its participation to the NUPES alliance following LFI leadership's refusal to qualify Hamas as a terrorist organization in the context of the Gaza war.

== History ==
=== Formation ===
In October 2021, shortly before the 2022 French presidential election, Jean-Luc Mélenchon, the initiator of the coalition, launched the People's Union. In December 2021, he announced the creation of a Parliament of the People's Union, which aimed to bring together personalities from outside La France Insoumise (LFI) in order to support its candidacy.

In the context of the 2022 French legislative election, LFI, the largest left-wing force in the presidential election, sought to unite the main left-wing parties around the banner of the New People's Ecological and Social Union. Discussions were held with the Europe Ecology – The Greens (EELV) and the French Communist Party (PCF), which joined the coalition on 2–3 May 2022, respectively, while the Socialist Party (PS), after having reached an agreement to join the coalition on 4 May, voted to do so in its National Council on 5 May. After that, the New Anticapitalist Party (NPA) announced it would not enter the coalition due to insurmountable ideological differences with the PS; it also said it would support the coalition's candidates that belonged to the radical left-wing. The Republican and Socialist Left (GRS) said it would negotiate its entry into the union.

Two groupings of smaller left-wing parties reached out to the coalition seeking to start negotiations: the Federation of the Republican Left, composed of GRS along with the Citizen and Republican Movement, Engagement, Left Radicals, and the New Socialist Left, and the Social and Ecologist Rally, composed of Allons Enfants, Democratic and Social Left, Liberté Ecologie Fraternité, New Deal, and Together on Our Territories. Failing to do so, the GRS and its allies announced its intention to run 100 candidates. On 20 May, New Deal announced that it was withdrawing its candidates and endorsing NUPES candidates around the country.

=== Expansion ===
With the aim of a coalition agreement, EELV proposed changing the name People's Union to Popular and Ecologist Union, or People's Ecologist and Social Front. Shortly before 2 May, an agreement was concluded with EELV, under the common banner of the New Ecological and Social People's Union. The agreement provided for 100 constituencies out of 577 for the environmental bloc. EELV wanted the centers of the cities won in the 2020 French municipal elections. It obtained Bordeaux, Strasbourg, and Lyon, as well as the 3rd, 5th, 8th, and 9th constituencies of Paris. On 3 May, the PCF announced that it would join the coalition. In its press release, the party said it would want to form a majority with its allies and that the PCF and LFI share "common pragmatic objectives".

The PS initially ruled out talks with LFI, before joining the talks on 27 April; the talks were again suspended on 29 April. The PS leader Olivier Faure negotiated with LFI in its headquarters on 2 May. A day later, Manuel Bompard, the negotiator for LFI, said that negotiations between the parties had been "difficult on merits and on the constituencies". On 4 May, the PS came to an agreement in principle with the coalition, subject to a vote by the party's national council the next day. The national council ratified the agreement on 5 May. After the PS was admitted, the NPA announced that it would not formally join the coalition but said it would support more radical left-wing NUPES candidates.

=== 2022 French legislative election ===
In the first round of the 2022 French legislative election, NUPES finished either second (per the Ministry of the Interior) or first (per Le Monde), slightly behind or ahead of Ensemble (25.75%–25.66% per the Ministry of the Interior and 26.1%–25.9% per Le Monde). This was because some NUPES candidates had not had their affiliation registered by the Ministry of Interior, which French media took in consideration. Four LFI candidates were elected in the first round, the most of any party or coalition, and 386 NUPES candidates qualified for the second round; of the over 70 dissident candidates, 15 qualified for the second round.

After the second round, NUPES was forecast to win 149 seats, resulting in a hung parliament and the loss of an absolute majority for Macron's Ensemble. As NUPES was only an electoral agreement and each party is expected to form its own parliamentary group, it did not become the largest parliamentary opposition group. As with the first round, several news outlets, such as Le Monde, gave a different result as to the final seat count, with NUPES on 142 rather than 131 due to differences as to candidates, particularly in the French overseas constituencies, being classified as members of these alliances or not.

=== Electoral results and aftermath ===
Depending on the method of calculation, NUPES won either 131 seats (according to the Ministry of the Interior) or 142 (according to Le Monde), (Note: This discrepancy is because Le Monde counts deputies elected from overseas territories that were backed by NUPES but not formally part of the coalition as NUPES members, while the Ministry of the Interior only counts deputies elected from formal members of the coalition.) enough to deny Macron's Ensemble Citoyens coalition a parliamentary majority and to form the formal opposition in Parliament. The coalition performed worse than most polls between the first and second round indicated, and the far-right National Rally (RN) gained 89 seats, its best result ever.

Fabien Roussel, leader of the PCF, said of the results: "[NUPES] didn't allow us to have a majority, and it didn't prevent the far right from making strong progress either, and that calls out to me, that questions me ... I can see that the alliance only speaks to part of France, to that of the big cities, and not to that of rurality." He also praised the alliance for having led the French Left to win far more seats than in the 2017 French legislative election.

The day after the election, LFI's Jean-Luc Mélenchon said the results were "disappointing" and called for a united NUPES parliamentary group, as no individual party in NUPES exceeded the 89 seats won by the RN, and official opposition could fall to the RN if NUPES was unable to form a larger parliamentary group. The leaders of EELV, PCF, and PS announced that they were opposed to a unified group in parliament. Mélenchon said that he would not take part in talks with Macron for government, while leaders of two NUPES parties, the PS leader Olivier Faure and the PCF's Roussel, stated that they would do so. LFI requested a vote of no confidence to be held on 5 July, but did not pass with only NUPES voting for it.

Despite the formation of separate groups in the National Assembly, NUPES voted as a bloc to elect Éric Coquerel of LFI President of the Finance Committee, defeating candidates from RN and The Republicans. The post of President of the Finance Committee traditionally goes to the largest opposition group in parliament.

=== Election of René Pilato ===
In the 2022 election in Charente's 1st constituency, NUPES candidate René Pilato lost to presidential majority incumbent Thomas Mesnier by 24 votes. The election was deemed invalid in December 2022 due to irregularities. A by-election was held in January 2023, which led to Pilato winning by slightly under 500 votes over Mesnier, a gain for NUPES at the expense of the presidential majority.

=== Quatennens Affair ===
In September 2022, French newspaper Le Canard enchaîné published an article revealing that Adrien Quatennens, national co-ordinator of LFI and MP had been accused of domestic violence by his wife. Following this revelation, an investigation was opened by the Lille police. In a press release Quatennens admitted to having slapped his wife once, before backtracking and describing a multitude of events of "extreme mutual tension" that led to him grabbing her wrist, elbowing her or sending excessive amounts of text messages. Following these revelations, he resigned from his post as LFI co-ordinator but remained an MP. On the 26th of September, Quatennens' wife officially pressed charges. This caused large amounts of tension within the NUPES with a lot of criticism being directed towards LFI, particularly because other sexual misconduct allegations had been directed towards Éric Coquerel and Taha Bouhafs earlier in the year, with the latter not even being able to stand in the legislative election.

Many within the NUPES perceived LFI's inability to deal with the Quatennens Affair as a political fault, notably EELV MP Sandrine Rousseau. Furthermore, political analysts and commentators saw LFI's decision to maintain Quatennens as an MP as the movement turning its back on militants and younger generations. An open letter published in Le Monde in December 2022, and signed by over one thousand militants and LFI supporters demanded the resignation of Quatennens and his withdrawal from politics.

After pleading guilty to the charges against him, Quatennens was convicted to four months of prison with surcharge and a 2000 euro fine. Following this, he was excluded from the LFI-NUPES parliamentary group and sat as a non-inscrit until his reintegration into the group in April 2023, with the decision to welcome him back into the group sparking debate throughout both the NUPES and the LFI group itself.

=== Bayou Affair ===
Simultaneously, alongside the Quattennens Affair, a similar case erupted involving EELV national secretary Julien Bayou. In July 2022, it was reported to the EELV internal cell for violence and sexual harassment that Bayou had been carrying out behaviour of "psychological violence and harassment" towards women in his entourage. On the 20th of September, in the midst of the Quatennens Affair, Bayou resigned from his post as co-president of the EELV parliamentary group and from his position as EELV national secretary. According to French magazine Marianne, this came as a result of internal pressure from prominent EELV member Sandrine Rousseau.

Following Bayou's resignation, he has stayed relatively quiet in the media, though he remains an MP and continues to sit with the EELV parliamentary group at the National Assembly. Following the 2022 EELV party congress, Marine Tondelier was elected national secretary with 90.8% of votes.

Many journalists and political commentators saw the large of number of allegations directed towards NUPES members as discrediting the political union.

=== Tensions with the Communist Party ===
As early as September 2022, tensions began to arise between the NUPES and Communist Party national secretary Fabien Roussel, with many left-wing commentators seeing Roussel as too "right-wing" with some newspapers calling him "the right's favourite communist." Further tensions arose in 2023 after Roussel called Minister of the Interior Gérald Darmanin a friend and stated that they have "known [each other] for a long time." This came after weeks of extreme violence between protestors and police in the wake of the 2023 pension reform.

More tensions arose in April 2023 after Roussel called the NUPES an "outdated" electoral coalition that "had failed." He also expressed his desires to extend the coalition notably to former Socialist Prime Minister Bernard Cazeneuve, an ardent critic of the NUPES. This led to disagreements within the Communist Party, notably with MPs Sébastien Jumel and Pierre Dharréville. These statements were also met with criticism from LFI who issued a press-statement directed at Roussel. During a speech at the 2023 Communist Party congress, where he was re-elected with 80.4% of votes, Roussel replied to LFI and NUPES saying "I say it clearly and in fraternity, mind your own business!"

=== Socialist infighting and election of Martine Froger ===
In January 2023, the Socialist Party held its 80th congress in Marseille. Olivier Faure, incumbent first secretary was re-elected with 51.09% of the vote. Nonetheless, both Faure and challenger, Rouen mayor Nicolas Mayer-Rossignol would each claim that they had won, making it unclear who the true winner was for a couple of days. In the end, a collective leadership agreement was agreed upon and Mayer-Rossignol was appointed delegate national secretary.

A soft critic of the NUPES, Mayer-Rossignol's race for national secretary was supported by a number of the party's "elephants" notably Paris Mayor Anne Hidalgo, anti-NUPES figure Carole Delga and former President François Hollande.

On 27 January 2023, the Constitutional Council of France ruled the re-election of LFI MP Bénédicte Taurine as unconstitutional as a result of contentious ballots from the RN candidate, triggering a by-election. Despite the national direction of the Socialist Party offering their support to Taurine, the local federation alongside the Radical Party of the Left chose to support dissident Socialist candidate Martine Froger. Both candidates made it to the second round of voting, and Froger benefited from the support of the Renaissance and RN candidates who called to "make barrage" against Taurine. Furthermore, former Socialist Prime Minister Bernard Cazeneuve joined Froger in the constituency, offering her his support. Froger was elected with 60.2% of the vote and was congratulated in person by Mayer-Rossignol and Carol Delga, against the wishes of both the NUPES and the Socialist Party leadership. To date no sanctions have been taken against Mayer-Rossignol and other members of the Socialist Party.

Once elected, Froger caused further tension within the NUPES with the question of her seating in the Socialist Parliamentary Group posing a problem for some, with many not seeing it fit that she sit within the NUPES intergroup. Some suggested that she sit with the centrist LIOT group alongside other dissident socialists.

=== Socialist Party suspension ===
In the aftermath of Hamas's attack on Israel on 7 October 2023 and the subsequent Gaza war, the Socialist Party voted 54%–46% for a "moratorium" on participating in the alliance due to LFI's refusal to explicitly denounce Hamas as a terrorist organization. The result of the vote was announced on 18 October 2023. Socialist Party leader Olivier Faure reiterated his support for a broad union of the French left, but called Jean-Luc Mélenchon an "obstacle to unity." Mélenchon posted on Twitter that Faure had led the suspension of the Socialist Party due to "personal reasons" between the two.

== Members ==
The initial agreement, struck on 1 May 2022, brought together La France Insoumise and its allies together with a grouping of ecologist parties, including Europe Ecology – The Greens, Ecology Generation, Génération.s, and The New Democrats. On 3 May, the French Communist Party agreed to join the alliance, followed by the Socialist Party and Place Publique on 4 May. On 20 May, New Deal announced its endorsement of the coalition.

Party	Abbr.	Ideology	Political position	Leader(s)
La France Insoumise and allies
La France Insoumise	LFI	Democratic socialism Left-wing populism	Left-wing	Jean-Luc Mélenchon; Manuel Bompard
Left Party	PG	Democratic socialism Left-wing populism	Left-wing	Éric Coquerel; Danielle Simonnet
Ensemble!	E!	Socialism; Eco-socialism	Left-wing to far-left	Collective leadership
Picardie Debout	PD	Left-wing populism Economic nationalism	Left-wing	François Ruffin
Ecological Revolution for the Living	REV	Deep ecology Green politics	Left-wing	Aymeric Caron
Independent Workers' Party	POI	Marxism	Left-wing to far-left	Collective
Rézistans Égalité 974	RÉ974	Democratic socialism Regionalism	Left-wing to far-left	Jean-Hugues Ratenon
Les Écologistes
The Ecologists	LE	Green politics Alter-globalisation	Centre-left to left-wing	Marine Tondelier
Génération.s	G.s	Democratic socialism Eco-socialism	Left-wing	Benoît Hamon
Ecology Generation	GÉ	Green politics Ecofeminism	Centre	Delphine Batho
Socialist Party and allies
Socialist Party	PS	Social democracy	Centre-left	Olivier Faure
Place Publique	PP	Social democracy	Centre-left	Raphaël Glucksmann
New Deal	ND	Progressivism	Centre-left to left-wing	Arnaud Lelache; Aline Mouquet
Movement for the Development of Mayotte	MDM			
French Communist Party and allies
French Communist Party	PCF	Communism	Left-wing	Fabien Roussel
For Réunion	PLR	Democratic socialism Post-Marxism	Left-wing	Huguette Bello
Tāvini Huiraʻatira	TH	Progressivism; French Polynesian autonomism/independence	Centre-left to left-wing	Oscar Temaru
Péyi-A	Péyi-A	Martiniquean independence	Centre-left to left-wing	Jean-Philippe Nilor; Marcelin Nadeau

=== Former members ===
On 16 October 2022, The New Democrats merged to Europe Ecology – The Greens.

Party	Abbr.	Ideology	Political position	Leader(s)
The New Democrats	ND	Social liberalism Environmentalism	Centre-left	Aurélien Taché; Émilie Cariou

== Candidates 2022 ==
Constituency breakdown by party and bloc
Party or bloc		Constituencies	Proportion
La France Insoumise and associated parties (La France Insoumise, Left Party, Ensemble!, Picardie debout, Ecological Revolution for the Living)		326	56.50%
Ecologist Pole	Europe Ecology – The Greens	80	13.86%
Ecologist Pole	Génération.s	9	1.56%
Ecologist Pole	Ecology Generation	9	1.56%
Ecologist Pole	The New Democrats	2	0.35%
Ecologist Pole	Total	100	17.33 %
Socialist Party		70	11.96 %
French Communist Party		50	8.84%
Undeclared (outre-mer and Corsica)		31	5.55 %
Total		577	100 %

=== Breakdown by constituency ===
Candidates per constituency (Note: Exhaustive lists of candidates are maintained by Le Monde and Ce Sera NUPES.)

Constituency	Party		Candidate	First-round vote	Second-round vote	Elected
Ain (1)		Parti socialiste	Sébastien Guéraud	23.87%	36.78%	No
Ain (2)		Europe Écologie Les Verts	Lumir Lapray	25.42%	41.66%	No
Ain (3)		La France insoumise	Christian Jolie	22.36%	41.28%	No
Ain (4)		La France insoumise	Philippe Lerda	17.38%	37.73%	No
Ain (5)		La France insoumise	Florence Pisani	23.54%	42.14%	No
Aisne (1)		La France insoumise	Olivier Fenioux	19.05%	N/A	No
Aisne (2)		La France insoumise	Sulyvan Ransquin	17.66%	N/A	No
Aisne (3)		Parti socialiste	Jean-Louis Bricout (incumbent)	45.88%	54.84%	Yes
Aisne (4)		Parti communiste français	Aurélien Gall	22.66%	N/A	No
Aisne (5)		La France insoumise	Stéphane Frère	18.85%	35.59%	No
Allier (1)		Parti communiste français	Yannick Monnet	30.57%	55.41%	Yes
Allier (2)		La France insoumise	Louise Héritier	21.84%	49.78%	No
Allier (3)		Parti socialiste	Elsa Denferd	19.53%	N/A	No
Alpes-de-Haute-Provence (1)		Les Nouveaux Démocrates	Delphine Bagarry (incumbent)	27.99%	48.80%	No
Alpes-de-Haute-Provence (2)		La France insoumise	Léo Walter	29.30%	51.49%	Yes
Hautes-Alpes (1)		La France insoumise	Michel Philippo	28.87%	49.64%	No
Hautes-Alpes (2)		La France insoumise	Capucine Mounal	29.22%	43.41%	No
Alpes-Maritimes (1)		La France insoumise	Anne-Laure Chaintron	20.42%	N/A	No
Alpes-Maritimes (2)		La France insoumise	Sonia Naffati	18.82%	N/A	No
Alpes-Maritimes (3)		La France insoumise	Enzo Giusti	21.95%	42.56%	No
Alpes-Maritimes (4)		Parti communiste français	Sophie Burnot-Poulet	12.39%	N/A	No
Alpes-Maritimes (5)		Europe Écologie Les Verts	Philippe Benassaya	17.73%	N/A	No
Alpes-Maritimes (6)		La France insoumise	Nicole Mazzella	13.30%	N/A	No
Alpes-Maritimes (7)		La France insoumise	Arthur Meyer Abbatucci	15.58%	N/A	No
Alpes-Maritimes (8)		La France insoumise	Lucia Soudant	12.39%	N/A	No
Alpes-Maritimes (9)		Parti socialiste	Chantal Chasseriaud	14.72%	N/A	No
Ardèche (1)		Parti socialiste	Hervé Saulignac (incumbent)	38.28%	60.05%	Yes
Ardèche (2)		La France insoumise	Christophe Goulouzell	23.57%	41.14%	No
Ardèche (3)		La France insoumise	Florence Pallot	26.68%	42.89%	No
Ardennes (1)		Europe Écologie Les Verts	Julien Duruisseau	18.48%	N/A	No
Ardennes (2)		La France insoumise	Gilles Loyez	19.06%	N/A	No
Ardennes (3)		La France insoumise	Sophie Perrin	14.78%	N/A	No
Ariège (1)		La France insoumise	Bénédicte Taurine (incumbent)	33.12%	55.31%	Yes
Ariège (2)		La France insoumise	Michel Larive (incumbent)	29.05%	43.29%	No
Aube (1)		Europe Écologie Les Verts	Laurent Spagnesi	14.51%	N/A	No
Aube (2)		La France insoumise	Sarah Fraincart	16.89%	N/A	No
Aube (3)		La France insoumise	Gaëtan Seffals	21.89%	N/A	No
Aude (1)		Parti socialiste	Sophie Courrière-Calmon	28.15%	46.44%	No
Aude (2)		Parti socialiste	Viviane Thivent	20.94%	N/A	No
Aude (3)		La France insoumise	Johanna Adda-Netter	25.80%	46.68%	No
Aveyron (1)		Europe Écologie Les Verts	Léon Thébault	21.55%	36.175	No
Aveyron (2)		La France insoumise	Laurent Alexandre	27.78%	50.99%	Yes
Aveyron (3)		La France insoumise	Michel Rhin	27.09%	46.29%	No
Bouches-du-Rhône (1)		Parti socialiste	Thibaud Rosique	19.41%	N/A	No
Bouches-du-Rhône (2)		Europe Écologie Les Verts	Alexandre Rupnik	21.56%	38.36%	No
Bouches-du-Rhône (3)		La France insoumise	Mohamed Bensaada	27.73%	45.04%	No
Bouches-du-Rhône (4)		La France insoumise	Manuel Bompard	56.04%	73.92%	Yes
Bouches-du-Rhône (5)		La France insoumise	Hendrik Davi	40.30%	56.64%	Yes
Bouches-du-Rhône (6)		Parti socialiste	Magali Holagne	21.96%	N/A	No
Bouches-du-Rhône (7)		La France insoumise	Sébastien Delogu	37.88%	64.68%	Yes
Bouches-du-Rhône (8)		La France insoumise	Eric Deligny	19.41%	N/A	No
Bouches-du-Rhône (9)		La France insoumise	Lucas Trottman	21.56%	41.36%	No
Bouches-du-Rhône (10)		La France insoumise	Marina Mesure	21.67%	40.38%	No
Bouches-du-Rhône (11)		Génération.s	Stéphane Salord	22.47%	N/A	No
Bouches-du-Rhône (12)		La France insoumise	Isabelle Chauvin	19.12%	N/A	No
Bouches-du-Rhône (13)		Parti communiste français	Pierre Dharréville (incumbent)	35.83%	52.01%	Yes
Bouches-du-Rhône (14)		La France insoumise	Hélène Le Cacheux	25.80%	43.15%	No
Bouches-du-Rhône (15)		La France insoumise	Michèle Jung	18.78%	N/A	No
Bouches-du-Rhône (16)		Parti socialiste	Christophe Caillault	26.73%	45.06%	No
Cavaldos (1)		La France insoumise	Emma Fourreau	35.81%	49.73%	No
Cavaldos (2)		Parti socialiste	Arthur Delaporte	42.01%	59.86%	Yes
Cavaldos (3)		La France insoumise	Didier Canu	21.44%	N/A	No
Cavaldos) (4)		Parti communiste français	Pierre Mouraret	22.64%	38.92%	No
Cavaldos (5)		Europe Écologie Les Verts	Valérie Harel	23.19%	44.32%	No
Cavaldos (6)		La France insoumise	Noé Gauchard	24.53%	47.54%	No
Cantal (1)		La France insoumise	Michel Maciazek	18.51%	N/A	No
Cantal (2)		La France insoumise	Melody Morille	16.33%	N/A	No
Charente (1)		La France insoumise	René Pilato	27.53%	49.97%	No
Charente (2)		La France insoumise	Chloé Chevalier	20.50%	N/A	No
Charente (3)		Parti socialiste	Marie-Pierre Noël	19.48%	N/A	No
Charente-Maritime (1)		Europe Écologie Les Verts	Jean-Marc Soubeste	23.39%	38.89%	No
Charente-Maritime (2)		La France insoumise	Nordine Raymond	27.50%	48.24%	No
Charente-Maritime (3)		La France insoumise	Gérald Dahan	21.07%	N/A	No
Charente-Maritime (4)		La France insoumise	Danièle Desselles	19.73%	N/A	No
Charente-Maritime (5)		Parti socialiste	Margarita Sola	19.88%	N/A	No
Cher (1)		Parti socialiste	Alex Charpentier	24.20%	42.86%	No
Cher (2)		Parti communiste français	Nicolas Sansu	32.36%	54.37%	Yes
Cher (3)		La France insoumise	Aliénor Garcia Bosch de Morales	21.82%	N/A	No
Corrèze (1)		La France insoumise	Sandrine Deveaud	25.40%	46.20%	No
Corrèze (2)		Europe Écologie Les Verts	Chloé Herzhaft	21.16%	41.60%	No
Corse-du-Sud (1)		N/A	No NUPES candidate (Note: Ce Sera NUPES lists PS candidate Angélique Sussini as the NUPES candidate; she is not listed on NUPES's official list of candidates.)	-		
Corse-du-Sud (2)		N/A	No NUPES candidate (Note: Ce Sera NUPES lists PS candidate Ghislaine Salmat as the NUPES candidate; she is not listed on NUPES's official list of candidates.)	-		
Haute-Corse (1)		N/A	No NUPES candidate (Note: Ce Sera NUPES lists LFI candidate Dominqiue Mauny as the NUPES candidate; she is not listed on NUPES's official list of candidates.)	-		
Haute-Corse (2)		N/A	No NUPES candidate (Note: Ce Sera NUPES lists former PS candidate Brigitte Sassou as the NUPES candidate; she has withdrawn her candidacy and was never invested by NUPES, as with the other Corsican constituencies.)	-		
Côte-d'Or (1)		La France insoumise	Antoine Peillon	25.63%	41.97%	No
Côte-d'Or (2)		Europe Écologie Les Verts	Catherine Hervieu	29.27%	48.30%	No
Côte-d'Or (3)		Parti communiste français	Patricia Marc	25.38%	49.89%	No
Côte-d'Or (4)		La France insoumise	Stéphane Guinot	17.63%	N/A	No
Côte-d'Or (5)		Parti communiste français	Isabelle de Almeida	19.66%	N/A	No
Côtes-d'Armor (1)		La France insoumise	Marion Gogiard	27.49%	47.31%	No
Côtes-d'Armor (2)		Parti socialiste	Bruno Ricard	25.83%	44.17%	No
Côtes-d'Armor (3)		Europe Écologie Les Verts	Antoine Ravard	22.66%	35.13%	No
Côtes-d'Armor (4)		La France insoumise	Murielle Lepvraud	27.21%	53.42%	Yes
Côtes-d'Armor (5)		La France insoumise	Marie-Amélie Troadec	26.44%	47.51%	No
Creuse (1)		La France insoumise	Catherine Couturier	26.37%	51.44%	Yes
Dordogne (1)		La France insoumise	Pascale Martin	24.33%	51.85%	Yes
Dordogne (2)		La France insoumise	Michèle Roux	21.19%	N/A	No
Dordogne (3)		La France insoumise Parti ouvrier indépendant	Cyril Girardeau	23.68%	34.41%	No
Dordogne (4)		Génération.s	Sébastien Peytavie	26.08%	55.52%	Yes
Doubs (1)		La France insoumise	Séverine Véziès	29.78%	48.12%	No
Doubs (2)		Europe Écologie Les Verts	Stéphane Ravacley	32.51%	47.74%	No
Doubs (3)		Parti communiste français	Virginie Dayet	20.45%	N/A	No
Doubs (4)		La France insoumise	Brigitte Cottier	20.12%	N/A	No
Doubs (5)		La France insoumise	Martine Ludi	18.72%	N/A	No
Drôme (1)		La France insoumise	Karim Chkeri	27.98%	45.58%	No
Drôme (2)		La France insoumise	Gilles Reynaud	23.91%	42.88%	No
Drôme (3)		Europe Écologie Les Verts	Marie Pochon	35.49%	52.22%	Yes
Drôme (4)		Parti socialiste	Pierre Jouvet	30.50%	42.10%	No
Eure (1)		Génération écologie	Christophe Ancelin	19.22%	N/A	No
Eure (2)		La France insoumise	Nathalie Samson	21.02%	N/A	No
Eure (3)		La France insoumise	Dorine Le Pêcheur	19.13%	N/A	No
Eure (4)		Parti socialiste	Philippe Brun	28.97%	50.44%	Yes
Eure (5)		Europe Écologie Les Verts	Pierre-Yves Jourdain	20.85%	N/A	No
Eure-et-Loir (1)		Génération écologie	Quentin Guillemain	22.83%	N/A	No
Eure-et-Loir (2)		La France insoumise	Kévin Boëté	18.65%	N/A	No
Eure-et-Loir (3)		La France insoumise	Valéria Dos Santos Orfila	19.08%	N/A	No
Eure-et-Loir (4)		La France insoumise	Mathieu Gaston	15.42%	N/A	No
Finistère (1)		Europe Écologie Les Verts	Grégory Lebert	32.08%	46.11%	No
Finistère (2)		La France insoumise	Pierre-Yves Cadalen	31.91%	49.84%	No
Finistère (3)		La France insoumise	Pierre Smolarz	29.18%	42.10%	No
Finistère (4)		Génération.s	Sylvaine Vulpiani	30.98%	45.60%	No
Finistère (5)		Parti socialiste	Nathalie Sarrabezolles	29.03%	45.42%	No
Finistère (6)		Parti socialiste	Mélanie Thomin	31.16%	50.85%	Yes
Finistère (7)		La France insoumise	Yolande Bouin	29.99%	47.75%	No
Finistère (8)		La France insoumise	Youenn Le Flao	31.66%'	47.57%	No
Gard (1)		La France insoumise	Charles Ménard	23.93%	N/A	No
Gard (2)		La France insoumise	Coaralie Ghiardi	21.79%	N/A	No
Gard (3)		Parti communiste français	Sabine Oromi	20.66%	N/A	No
Gard (4)		Parti socialiste	Arnaud Bord	26.58%	45.51%	No
Gard (5)		La France insoumise	Michel Sala	33.48%	53.00%	Yes
Gard (6)		Europe Écologie Les Verts	Nicolas Cadène	25.65%	47.83%	No
Haute-Garonne (1)		La France insoumise	Hadrien Clouet	39.79%	54.22%	Yes
Haute-Garonne (2)		La France insoumise	Anne Stambach-Terrenoir	37.25%	52.90%	Yes
Haute-Garonne (3)		La France insoumise	Agathe Roby	31.60%	44.29%	No
Haute-Garonne (4)		La France insoumise	François Piquemal	46.54%	59.26%	Yes
Haute-Garonne (5)		La France insoumise	Sylvie Espagnolle	27.85%	48.11%	No
Haute-Garonne (6)		Parti socialiste	Fabien Jouvé	29.39%	49.99%	No
Haute-Garonne (7)		La France insoumise	Christophe Bex	30.68%	51.17%	Yes
Haute-Garonne (8)		Parti socialiste	Joël Aviragnet (incumbent)	28.67%	60.39%	Yes
Haute-Garonne (9)		Europe Écologie Les Verts	Christine Arrighi	39.77%	58.55%	Yes
Haute-Garonne (10)		Génération.s	Alice Assier	33.16%	49.80%	No
Gers (1)		La France insoumise	Pascal Levieux	25.44%	47.49%	No
Gers (2)		La France insoumise	François Dubos	17.52%	N/A	No
Gironde (1)		Europe Écologie Les Verts	Catherine Cestari	27.31%	40.89%	No
Gironde (2)		Europe Écologie Les Verts	Nicolas Thierry	45.12%	53.34%	Yes
Gironde (3)		La France insoumise	Loïc Prud'homme (incumbent)	44.89%	59.27%	Yes
Gironde (4)		Parti socialiste	Alain David (incumbent)	40.55%	59.73%	Yes
Gironde (5)		La France insoumise	Olivier Maneiro	25.92%	46.72%	No
Gironde (6)		Parti socialiste	Vanessa Fergeau	33.93%	48.15%	No
Gironde (7)		La France insoumise	Jean-Renaud Ferran	34.51%	47.29%	No
Gironde (8)		Parti communiste français	Marylène Faure	18.84%	N/A	No
Gironde (9)		La France insoumise	Sacha André	24.23%	49.51%	No
Gironde (10)		Europe Écologie Les Verts	Pascal Bourgois	23.40%	N/A	No
Gironde (11)		La France insoumise	Mathieu Caillaud	22.75%	N/A	No
Gironde (12)		La France insoumise	Mathilde Feld	26.94%	49.77%	No
Hérault (1)		La France insoumise	Julien Colet	26.94%	47.45%	No
Hérault (2)		La France insoumise	Nathalie Oziol	40.37%	63.33%	Yes
Hérault (3)		Europe Écologie Les Verts	Julia Mignacca	28.59%	46.90%	No
Hérault (4)		La France insoumise	Sébastien Rome	28.06%	50.65%	Yes
Hérault (5)		La France insoumise	Pierre Polard	24.32%	45.76%	No
Hérault (6)		La France insoumise	Magali Crozier	17.05%	30.17%	No
Hérault (7)		Parti communiste français	Gabriel Blasco	21.75%	40.81%	No
Hérault (8)		La France insoumise	Sylvain Carrière	29.35%	50.59%	Yes
Hérault (9)		La France insoumise	Nadia Belaouni	24.60%	45.63%	No
Ille-et-Vilaine (1)		La France insoumise	Frédéric Mathieu	39.27%	52.62%	Yes
Ille-et-Vilaine (2)		Génération.s	Tristan Lahais	39.51%	48.18%	No
Ille-et-Vilaine (3)		Parti socialiste	Claudia Rouaux (incumbent)	35.72%	51.53%	Yes
Ille-et-Vilaine (4)		La France insoumise	Mathilde Hignet	32.61%	50.36%	Yes
Ille-et-Vilaine (5)		La France insoumise	Gilles Renault	26.05%	41.34%	No
Ille-et-Vilaine (6)		La France insoumise	Hélène Mocquard	25.63%	38.31%	No
Ille-et-Vilaine (7)		La France insoumise	Nicolas Guivarc'h	21.26%	N/A	No
Ille-et-Vilaine (8)		Parti socialiste	Mickaël Bouloux	45.72%	57.97%	Yes
Indre (1)		La France insoumise	Éloïse Gonzalez	22.54%	43.98%	No
Indre (2)		La France insoumise	Aymeric Compain	22.00%	N/A	No
Indre-et-Loire (1)		Europe Écologie Les Verts	Charles Fournier	39.60%	53.51%	Yes
Indre-et-Loire (2)		La France insoumise	Christelle Gobert	25.82%	45.29%	No
Indre-et-Loire (3)		La France insoumise	Roxane Sirven	24.15%	42.84%	No
Indre-et-Loire (4)		Parti socialiste	Laurent Baumel (incumbent)	29.55%	49.48%	No
Indre-et-Loire (5)		Parti communiste français	Françoise Langlade	19.38%	N/A	No
Isère (1)		La France insoumise	Salomé Robin	38.86%	44.47%	No
Isère (2)		Europe Écologie Les Verts	Cyrielle Chatelain	33.52%	52.13%	Yes
Isère (3)		La France insoumise	Élisa Martin	42.49%	57.48%	Yes
Isère (4)		Parti socialiste	Marie-Noëlle Battistel (incumbent)	42.22%	58.06%	Yes
Isère (5)		Europe Écologie Les Verts	Jérémie Iordanoff	32.39%	50.43%	Yes
Isère (6)		La France insoumise	Nicole Finas-Fillon	21.66%	N/A	No
Isère (7)		Parti communiste français	Dominique Dichard	20.95%	N/A	No
Isère (8)		Pôle écologiste – Divers gauche	Quentin Dogon	22.88%	N/A	No
Isère (9)		La France insoumise	Sandrine Nosbe	30.54%	46.20%	No
Isère (10)		La France insoumise	Joëlle Richolle	23.95%	N/A	No
Jura (1)		La France insoumise	Anthony Brondel	28.40%	43.78%	No
Jura (2)		Parti communiste français	Évelyne Ternant	24.51%	37.90%	No
Jura (3)		Europe Écologie Les Verts	Hervé Prat	24.84%	41.54%	No
Landes (1)		La France insoumise	Guy de Barbeyrac	22.95%	44.19%	No
Landes (2)		Parti communiste français	Jean-Marc Lespade	30.24%	48.06%	No
Landes (3)		Parti socialiste	Boris Vallaud (incumbent)	40.16%	59.93%	Yes
Loir-et-Cher (1)		La France Insoumise	Reda Belkadi	24.31%	43.53%	No
Loir-et-Cher (2)		Parti communiste français	Jérémie Demaline	16.97%	N/A	No
Loir-et-Cher (3)		Europe Écologie Les Verts	Noé Petit	19.30%	N/A	No
Loire (1)		Europe Écologie Les Verts	Laëtitia Copin	22.60%	47.90%	No
Loire (2)		La France insoumise	Andrée Taurinya	34.37%	50.63%	Yes
Loire (3)		Parti communiste français	Vincent Bony	23.66%	42.68%	No
Loire (4)		La France insoumise	Bernard Paemelaere	23.56%	38.39%	No
Loire (5)		La France insoumise	Ismaël Stevenson	20.35%	N/A	No
Loire (6)		La France insoumise	André Bouchut	18.99%	N/A	No
Haute-Loire (1)		Europe Écologie Les Verts	Céline Gacon	18.96%	29.78%	No
Haute-Loire (2)		La France insoumise	Azelma Sigaux	19.79%	N/A	No
Loire-Atlantique (1)		Parti socialiste	Karim Benbrahim	36.97%	47.92%	No
Loire-Atlantique (2)		La France insoumise	Andy Kerbrat	46.62%	55.80%	Yes
Loire-Atlantique (3)		La France insoumise	Ségolène Amiot	42.87%	55.70%	Yes
Loire-Atlantique (4)		Europe Écologie Les Verts	Julie Laernoes	42.82%	58.03%	Yes
Loire-Atlantique (5)		La France insoumise	Sabine Lalande	32.72%	45.59%	No
Loire-Atlantique (6)		Pôle écologiste – Divers gauche	Jean-Claude Raux	32.77%	52.84%	Yes
Loire-Atlantique (7)		Parti communiste français	Véronique Mahé	24.26%	42.94%	No
Loire-Atlantique (8)		La France insoumise	Matthias Tavel	32.04%	54.45%	Yes
Loire-Atlantique (9)		La France insoumise Parti ouvrier indépendant	Hélène Macon	28.60%	46.88%	No
Loire-Atlantique (10)		La France insoumise	Léonie Ferry	29.99%	43.48%	No
Loiret (1)		Parti socialiste	Ghislaine Kounowski	28.67%	42.79%	No
Loiret (2)		Génération.s	Emmanuel Duplessis	25.12%	44.22%	No
Loiret (3)		La France insoumise	Kevin Merlot	19.21%	N/A	No
Loiret (4)		Parti communiste français	Bruno Nottin	19.43%	36.64%	No
Loiret (5)		La France insoumise	Florence Chabirand	18.87	N/A	No
Loiret (6)		La France insoumise	Olivier Hicter	25.52%	42.73%	No
Lot (1)		La France insoumise	Elsa Bougeard	22.26%	35.37%	No
Lot (2)		La France insoumise	Thierry Grossemy	23.73%	33.80%	No
Lot-et-Garonne (1)		Europe Écologie Les Verts	Maryse Combes	26.21%	wd (Note: Candidate qualified for the second round, but withdrew their candidacy before the second round.)	No
Lot-et-Garonne (2)		Parti socialiste	Christophe Courregelongue	26.03%	30.75%	No
Lot-et-Garonne (3)		La France insoumise	Xavier Czapla	22.91%	43.03%	No
Lozère (1)		La France insoumise	Sandrine Descaves	25.41%	45.72%	No
Maine-et-Loire (1)		Génération.s	Arash Saeidi	29.87%	44.48%	No
Maine-et-Loire (2)		La France insoumise	Caroline Bessat	29.27%	43.24%	No
Maine-et-Loire (3)		La France insoumise	Véronique Roudévitch	23.18%	39.35%	No
Maine-et-Loire (4)		Parti communiste français	Caroline Rabault	23.09%	39.67%	No
Maine-et-Loire (5)		La France insoumise	Christophe Airaud	22.96%	39.24%	No
Maine-et-Loire (6)		La France insoumise	Tassadit Amghar	27.78%	42.40%	No
Maine-et-Loire (7)		Parti socialiste	Guillaume Jouanneau	30.32%	44.44%	No
Manche (1)		Europe Écologie Les Verts	Guillaume Hédouin	19.44%	31.22%	No
Manche (2)		La France insoumise	Patrick Grimbert	18.50%	35.55%	No
Manche (3)		Parti communiste français	Gaëlle Verove	23.66%	43.87%	No
Manche (4)		Parti socialiste	Anna Pic	31.61%	51.61%	Yes
Marne (1)		Europe Écologie Les Verts	Évelyne Bourgoin	24.19%	44.09%	No
Marne (2)		La France insoumise	Lynda Meguenine	22.46%	45.18%	No
Marne (3)		Parti communiste français	Chantal Berthelemy	17.88%	N/A	No
Marne (4)		La France insoumise	Anthony Smith	18.79%	N/A	No
Marne (5)		La France insoumise	Karine Le Luron	11.09%	N/A	No
Haute-Marne (1)		La France insoumise	Michele Leclerc	16.20%	N/A	No
Haute-Marne (2)		La France insoumise	Ingrid Viot	12.46%	N/A	No
Mayenne (1)		Parti socialiste	Guillaume Garot (incumbent)	49.62%	63.22%	Yes
Mayenne (2)		Europe Écologie Les Verts	Grégory Boisseau	23.89%	41.38%	No
Mayenne (3)		La France insoumise	Marion Detais	19.33%	N/A	No
Meurthe-et-Moselle (1)		La France insoumise	Nordine Jouira	32.83%	46.57%	No
Meurthe-et-Moselle (2)		Parti socialiste	Stéphane Hablot	36.59%	49.74%	No
Meurthe-et-Moselle (3)		La France insoumise	Martine Étienne	24.88%	51.94%	Yes
Meurthe-et-Moselle (4)		Pôle écologiste – Divers gauche	Barbara Bertozzi	19.18%	N/A	No
Meurthe-et-Moselle (5)		Parti socialiste	Dominique Potier (incumbent)	43.97%	63.12%	Yes
Meurthe-et-Moselle (6)		La France insoumise	Caroline Fiat (incumbent)	29.97%	50.23%	Yes
Meuse (1)		Parti socialiste	Olivier Guckert	17.49%	N/A	No
Meuse (2)		Europe Écologie Les Verts	Johan Laflotte	16.23%	N/A	No
Morbihan (1)		Parti socialiste	Luc Foucault	25.01%	40.75%	No
Morbihan (2)		La France insoumise	Karol Kirchner	24.87%	41.40%	No
Morbihan (3)		La France insoumise	Marie-Madeleine Doré-Lucas	22.51%	43.36%	No
Morbihan (4)		Parti communiste français	Lhéa Le Flecher	18.20%	N/A	No
Morbihan (5)		Europe Écologie Les Verts	Damien Girard	31.47%	48.65%	No
Morbihan (6)		La France insoumise	Jean-Michel Baudry	26.08%	45.19%	No
Moselle (1)		La France insoumise	Esther Leick	23.56%	N/A	No
Moselle (2)		La France insoumise	Lisa Lahore	21.44%	43.59%	No
Moselle (3)		La France insoumise	Charlotte Leduc	24.27%	51.46%	Yes
Moselle (4)		Parti communiste français	Hélène Giardot	13.28%	N/A	No
Moselle (5)		La France insoumise	Caroline Racine	14.55%	N/A	No
Moselle (6)		La France insoumise	Jonathan Outomuro	17.32%	N/A	No
Moselle (7)		Europe Écologie Les Verts	Luc Muller	19.72%	N/A	No
Moselle (8)		La France insoumise	Céline Léger	27.57%	47.57%	No
Moselle (9)		Parti socialiste	Brigitte Vaisse	22.16%	44.97%	No
Nièvre (1)		La France insoumise	Charlène Delacour	25.69%	N/A	No
Nièvre (2)		La France insoumise	Marie-Anne Guillemain	24.31%	N/A	No
Nord (1)		La France insoumise	Adrien Quatennens (incumbent)	52.05%	65.24%	Yes
Nord (2)		La France insoumise	Ugo Bernalicis (incumbent)	43.49%	58.00%'	Yes
Nord (3)		Parti socialiste	Sophie Villette	15.17%	N/A	No
Nord (4)		Europe Écologie Les Verts	Octave Delepierre	27.65%	43.95%	No
Nord (5)		La France insoumise	Ophélie Delneste	24.98%	48.86%	No
Nord (6)		La France insoumise	Celia Pereira	27.65%	36.93%	No
Nord (7)		Pôle écologiste – Divers gauche	Karima Chouia	26.41%	44.53%	No
Nord (8)		La France insoumise	David Guiraud	39.83%	59.94%	Yes
Nord (9)		Pôle écologiste – Divers gauche	Odile Vidal-Sagnier	27.22%	40.90%	No
Nord (10)		La France insoumise	Leslie Mortreux	23.08%	42.48%	No
Nord (11)		Parti socialiste	Roger Vicot	35.43%	56.27%	Yes
Nord (12)		La France insoumise	Malik Yahiatène	19.63%	N/A	No
Nord (13)		La France insoumise	Damien Lacroix	24.15%	N/A	No
Nord (14)		La France insoumise	Philippine Heyman	17.03%	N/A	No
Nord (15)		Pôle écologiste – Divers gauche	Emilie Ducourant	20.03	45.91%	No
Nord (16)		Parti communiste français	Alain Bruneel (incumbent)	33.59%	49.66%	No
Nord (17)		La France insoumise	Cyril Grandin	22.91%	N/A	No
Nord (18)		La France insoumise	Stéphane Maréchal	15.35%	N/A	No
Nord (19)		Parti communiste français	Patrick Soloch	25.63%	42.85%	No
Nord (20)		Parti communiste français	Fabien Roussel (incumbent)	34.13%	54.40%	Yes
Nord (21)		La France insoumise	Luce Troadec	23.48%	N/A	No
Oise (1)		Parti communiste français	Thierry Aury	18.62%	N/A	No
Oise (2)		La France insoumise	Annick Prévot	15.81%	N/A	No
Oise (3)		La France insoumise	Valérie Labatut	26.31%	47.58%	No
Oise (4)		La France insoumise	Mohamed Assamti	17.67%	N/A	No
Oise (5)		Pôle écologiste – Divers gauche	Luc Blanchard	21.33%	N/A	No
Oise (6)		Parti socialiste	Florian Dumoulin	17.95%	N/A	No
Oise (7)		Parti communiste français	Loïc Pen	26.56%	43.26%	No
Orne (1)		Parti socialiste	Chantal Jourdan (incumbent)	25.85%	50.20%	Yes
Orne (2)		Europe Écologie Les Verts	Cécile Bussière	16.17%	N/A	No
Orne (3)		La France insoumise	Mehdi Kemari	17.44%	N/A	No
Pas-de-Calais (1)		La France insoumise	Éric Cagnache	14.87%	N/A	No
Pas-de-Calais (2)		La France insoumise	Morgane Rengard	22.48%	N/A	No
Pas-de-Calais (3)		Parti communiste français	Jean-Marc Tellier	35.57%	50.11%	Yes
Pas-de-Calais (4)		Parti socialiste	Blandine Drain	17.33%	N/A	No
Pas-de-Calais (5)		La France insoumise	Nancy Bélart	18.03%	N/A	No
Pas-de-Calais (6)		La France insoumise	Pascal Lebecq	15.98%	N/A	No
Pas-de-Calais (7)		Europe Écologie Les Verts	Jean-Pierre Moussally	19.28%	N/A	No
Pas-de-Calais (8)		La France insoumise	Simon Roussel	15.75%	N/A	No
Pas-de-Calais (9)		La France insoumise	Amandine Bonifacio	15.98%	N/A	No
Pas-de-Calais (10)		La France insoumise	Sandrine Coquerie	17.25%	N/A	No
Pas-de-Calais (11)		Pôle écologiste – Divers gauche	Marine Tondelier	23.43%	38.97%	No
Pas-de-Calais (12)		Parti socialiste	Jérôme Darras	29.47%	43.70%	No
Puy-de-Dôme (1)		La France insoumise	Marianne Maximi	34.50%	52.23%	Yes
Puy-de-Dôme (2)		Parti socialiste	Christine Pirès-Beaune (incumbent)	41.89%	63.84%	Yes
Puy-de-Dôme (3)		Europe Écologie Les Verts	Nicolas Bonnet	30.08%	46.91%	No
Puy-de-Dôme (4)		La France insoumise	Valérie Goléo	30.73	49.87%	No
Puy-de-Dôme (5)		Parti communiste français	André Chassaigne (incumbent)	49.13%	69.43%	Yes
Pyrénées-Atlantiques (1)		La France insoumise	Jean-Yves Lalanne	31.78%	49.22%	No
Pyrénées-Atlantiques (2)		Génération écologie	Cécile Faure	25.47%	45.29%	No
Pyrénées-Atlantiques (3)		La France insoumise	Jean-François Baby	20.63%	33.45%	No
Pyrénées-Atlantiques (4)		Parti socialiste	Inaki Echaniz	24.07%	50.11%	Yes
Pyrénées-Atlantiques (5)		La France insoumise	Sandra Pereira-Ostanel	25.14%	45.60%	No
Pyrénées-Atlantiques (6)		La France insoumise	Tom Dubois-Robin	19.55%	39.79%	No
Hautes-Pyrénées (1)		La France insoumise	Sylvie Ferrer	24.69%	50.13%	Yes
Hautes-Pyrénées (2)		La France insoumise	Gregory Korn	22.95%	47.72%	No
Pyrénées-Orientales (1)		La France insoumise	Francis Daspe	23.63%	N/A	No
Pyrénées-Orientales (2)		Europe Écologie Les Verts	David Berrué	20.28%	N/A	No
Pyrénées-Orientales (3)		La France insoumise	Nathalie Cullel	27.29%	45.89%	No
Pyrénées-Orientales (4)		La France insoumise	Jérôme Pous	19.12%	N/A	No
Bas-Rhin (1)		Europe Écologie Les Verts	Sandra Regol	38.07%	51.47%	Yes
Bas-Rhin (2)		La France insoumise	Emmanuel Fernandes	36.89%	52.23%	Yes
Bas-Rhin (3)		La France insoumise	Sébastien Mas	30.82%	45.47%	No
Bas-Rhin (4)		La France insoumise	Imane Lahmeur	17.15%	33.90%	No
Bas-Rhin (5)		La France insoumise	Véronique Toulza	16.05%	N/A	No
Bas-Rhin (6)		Europe Écologie Les Verts	Martine Marchal-Minazzi	16.61%	N/A	No
Bas-Rhin (7)		La France insoumise	Lou Toussaint-Ianeva	12.63%	N/A	No
Bas-Rhin (8)		La France insoumise	Samy Ahmed-Yahia	9.86%	N/A	No
Bas-Rhin (9)		La France insoumise	Leila Witzmann	14.64%	N/A	No
Haut-Rhin (1)		Parti socialiste	Aïcha Fritsch	14.74%	N/A	No
Haut-Rhin (2)		La France insoumise	Lilian Bourgeois	15.79%	N/A	No
Haut-Rhin (3)		La France insoumise	Priscille Silva	12.41%	N/A	No
Haut-Rhin (4)		La France insoumise	Chrystelle Garel	15.31%	N/A	No
Haut-Rhin (5)		Génération.s	Nadia El Hajjaji	20.32	35.37%	No
Haut-Rhin (6)		La France insoumise	Léonie Hebert	19.27%	N/A	No
Rhône (1)		La France insoumise	Aurélie Gries	37.75%	48.14%	No
Rhône (2)		Génération écologie	Hubert Julien-Laferrière (incumbent)	34.82%	51.64%	Yes
Rhône (3)		Europe Écologie Les Verts	Marie-Charlotte Garin	43.68%	54.79%	Yes
Rhône (4)		Europe Écologie Les Verts	Benjamin Badouard	31.72%	40.65%	No
Rhône (5)		Parti socialiste	Fabrice Matteucci	22.82%	32.68%	No
Rhône (6)		La France insoumise	Gabriel Amard	41.30%	55.54%	Yes
Rhône (7)		La France insoumise	Abdelkader Lahmar	30.87%	46.56%	No
Rhône (8)		Parti communiste français	Cécile Bulin	19.25%	N/A	No
Rhône (9)		La France insoumise	Mylène Dune	20.24%	N/A	No
Rhône (10)		Parti socialiste	Michèle Edery	22.56%	34.69%	No
Rhône (11)		Parti communiste français	Abdel Yousfi	21.60%	35.91%	No
Rhône (12)		Europe Écologie Les Verts	Jean-François Baudin	23.03%	37.08%	No
Rhône (13)		La France insoumise	Victor Prandt	21.67%	37.35%	No
Rhône (14)		La France insoumise	Idir Boumertit	35.76%	56.69%	Yes
Haute-Saône (1)		La France insoumise	Sandra Girardot	18.84%	N/A	No
Haute-Saône (2)		La France insoumise	Patrice Guérain	20.79%	N/A	No
Saône-et-Loire (1)		Europe Écologie Les Verts	Patrick Monin	27.57%	42.75%	No
Saône-et-Loire (2)		Parti communiste français	Cécile Vinauger	20.01%	33.35%	No
Saône-et-Loire (3)		La France insoumise	Richard Beninger	21.19%	N/A	No
Saône-et-Loire (4)		Parti socialiste	Cécile Untermaier (incumbent)	33.97%	56.30%	Yes
Saône-et-Loire (5)		La France insoumise	Éric Riboulet	23.60%	47.34%	No
Sarthe (1)		La France insoumise	Ghislaine Bonnet	22.97%	45.10%	No
Sarthe (2)		Parti socialiste	Marietta Karamanli (incumbent)	36.53%	63.06%	Yes
Sarthe (3)		La France insoumise	Dominique Leloup	21.19%	N/A	No
Sarthe (4)		Parti socialiste	Elise Leboucher	21.87%	50.15%	Yes
Sarthe (5)		La France insoumise	Rabbi Kokolo	19.75%	N/A	No
Savoie (1)		Parti communiste français	Christel Granata	21.43%	40.67%	No
Savoie (2)		La France insoumise	Cédric Morand	21.94%	35.92%	No
Savoie (3)		La France insoumise	Nathalie Krawezynski	22.76%	34.46%	No
Savoie (4)		La France insoumise	Jean-François Coulomme	34.45%	50.85%	Yes
Haute-Savoie (1)		La France insoumise	Anne-Valérie Duval	23.85%	37.35%	No
Haute-Savoie (2)		Parti communiste français	Loris Fontana	22.99%	40.12%	No
Haute-Savoie (3)		La France insoumise	Fabienne Tassa	24.78%	36.64%	No
Haute-Savoie (4)		La France insoumise	Valerien Vervoort	21.71%	33.08%	No
Haute-Savoie (5)		Génération.s	Odile Martin-Cocher	21.86%	39.91%	No
Haute-Savoie (6)		La France insoumise	Ahmed Lounis	18.40%	N/A	No
Paris (1)		La France insoumise	Thomas Luquet	27.81%	34.43%	No
Paris (2)		Parti socialiste	Marine Rosset	27.27%	36.61%	No
Paris (3)		Europe Écologie Les Verts	Léa Balage El Mariky	38.66%	49.00%	No
Paris (4)		La France insoumise	Natalie Depraz	13.27%	N/A	No
Paris (5)		Europe Écologie Les Verts	Julien Bayou	48.88%	68.05%	Yes
Paris (6)		La France insoumise	Sophia Chikirou	53.74%	N/A	Yes
Paris (7)		La France insoumise	Caroline Mécary	40.43%	49.27%	No
Paris (8)		Europe Écologie Les Verts	Éva Sas	41.70%	54.08%	Yes
Paris (9)		Europe Écologie Les Verts	Sandrine Rousseau	42.90%	59.05%	Yes
Paris (10)		La France insoumise	Rodrigo Arenas	42.63%	54.43%	Yes
Paris (11)		Parti socialiste	Olivia Polski	37.57%	44.55%	No
Paris (12)		Parti communiste français	Céline Malaisé	22.34%	31.49%	No
Paris (13)		Europe Écologie Les Verts	Aminata Niakaté	30.55%	40.14%	No
Paris (14)		La France insoumise	Julie Maury	11.45%	N/A	No
Paris (15)		La France insoumise	Danielle Simonnet	47.71%	58.45%	Yes
Paris (16)		La France insoumise	Sarah Legrain	56.51%	N/A	Yes
Paris (17)		La France insoumise – Ensemble!	Danièle Obono (incumbent)	57.07%	N/A	Yes
Paris (18)		La France insoumise Révolution écologique pour le vivant	Aymeric Caron	45.05%	51.65%	Yes
Seine-Maritime (1)		La France insoumise	Maxime Da Silva	33.05%	49.88%	No
Seine-Maritime (2)		La France insoumise	Sébastien Duval	22.14%	40.36%	No
Seine-Maritime (3)		Parti communiste français	Hubert Wulfranc (incumbent)	44.21%	70.36%	Yes
Seine-Maritime (4)		La France insoumise	Alma Dufour	23.90%	53.72%	Yes
Seine-Maritime (5)		Parti socialiste	Gérard Leseul (incumbent)	33.68%	55.81%	Yes
Seine-Maritime (6)		Parti communiste français	Sébastien Jumel (incumbent)	37.66%	57.81%	Yes
Seine-Maritime (7)		La France insoumise	Nancy Duboc	26.80%	42.13%	No
Seine-Maritime (8)		Parti communiste français	Jean-Paul Lecoq (incumbent)	48.45%	65.76%	Yes
Seine-Maritime (9)		La France insoumise	Stéphane Fouani	20.33%	N/A	No
Seine-Maritime (10)		Europe Écologie Les Verts	Véronique Bérégovoy	21.01%	N/A	No
Seine-et-Marne (1)		La France insoumise	Arnaud Saint-Martin	27.68%	46.94%	No
Seine-et-Marne (2)		La France insoumise	Marie-Pierre Molina	23.01%	42.58%	No
Seine-et-Marne (3)		La France insoumise	Elodie Gérôme-Delagdo	25.27%	43.31%	No
Seine-et-Marne (4)		La France insoumise	Mathieu Garnier	20.24%	N/A	No
Seine-et-Marne (5)		La France insoumise	Cédric Colin	23.18%	N/A	No
Seine-et-Marne (6)		La France insoumise	Valérie Delage	26.80%	47.88%	No
Seine-et-Marne (7)		La France insoumise	Ersilia Soudais	30.87%	51.31%	Yes
Seine-et-Marne (8)		Europe Écologie Les Verts	Arnaud Bonnet	32.46%	49.99%	No
Seine-et-Marne (9)		La France insoumise	Pascal Novais	27.51%	47.37%	No
Seine-et-Marne (10)		La France insoumise	Maxime Laisney	37.15%	57.36%	Yes
Seine-et-Marne (11)		Parti socialiste	Olivier Faure (incumbent)	46.90%	64.45%	Yes
Yvelines (1)		La France insoumise	Muriel Bonnefond	24.49%	36.69%	No
Yvelines (2)		Europe Écologie Les Verts	Maïté Carrive-Bédouani	22.66%	35.73%	No
Yvelines (3)		La France insoumise	Louise Brody	17.71%	28.60%	No
Yvelines (4)		La France insoumise	Céline Bourdon	24.93%	34.31%	No
Yvelines (5)		La France insoumise	Sophie Thevenet	23.55%	35.38%	No
Yvelines (6)		La France insoumise	Mélinda Sauger	24.50%	35.48%	No
Yvelines (7)		Parti socialiste	Michèle Christophoul	27.19%	44.36%	No
Yvelines (8)		Génération.s	Benjamin Lucas	33.37%	56.61%	Yes
Yvelines (9)		La France insoumise Révolution écologique pour le vivant	Victor Pailhac	22.25%	N/A	No
Yvelines (10)		La France insoumise	Catherine Lasserre	22.04%	36.37%	No
Yvelines (11)		La France insoumise	William Martinet	32.20%	50.19%	Yes
Yvelines (12)		Génération écologie	Edwin Legris	24.10%	40.06%	No
Deux-Sèvres (1)		La France insoumise	François Charron	28.43%	48.01%	No
Deux-Sèvres (2)		Génération écologie	Delphine Batho (incumbent)	36.38%	57.88%	Yes
Deux-Sèvres (3)		La France insoumise	Juliette Woillez	22.36%	41.73%	No
Somme (1)		La France insoumise – Picardie debout	François Ruffin (incumbent)	40.09%	61.01%	Yes
Somme (2)		La France insoumise	Zahia Hamdane	29.98%	46.87%	No
Somme (3)		Parti communiste français	Arnaud Petit	16.68%	N/A	No
Somme (4)		Europe Écologie Les Verts	Élodie Héren	19.32%	N/A	No
Somme (5)		La France insoumise – Picardie debout	Guillaume Ancelet	20.29%	39.21%	No
Tarn (1)		La France insoumise	Gérard Poujade	21.37%	46.91%	No
Tarn (2)		La France insoumise	Karen Erodi	29.91%	37.50%	Yes
Tarn (3)		La France insoumise	Julien Lassalle	22.27%	46.29%	No
Tarn-et-Garonne (1)		Parti socialiste	Valérie Rabault (incumbent)	33.33%	58.29%	Yes
Tarn-et-Garonne (2)		La France insoumise	Nathalie Manchado	18.93%	N/A	No
Var (1)		La France insoumise	Éric Habouzit	19.65%	N/A	No
Var (2)		La France insoumise	Isaline Cornil	17.91%	N/A	No
Var (3)		Parti socialiste	Julia Peironet Bremond	16.27%	N/A	No
Var (4)		La France insoumise	Sabine Cristofani-Viglione	12.87%	N/A	No
Var (5)		La France insoumise	Robert Caraguel	12.09%	N/A	No
Var (6)		Parti communiste français	Alain Bolla	17.80%	N/A	No
Var (7)		Génération écologie	Basma Bouchkara	14.87%	N/A	No
Var (8)		La France insoumise	Catherine Jouanneau	18.79%	N/A	No
Vaucluse (1)		La France insoumise	Farid Faryssy	30.55%	48.86%	No
Vaucluse (2)		La France insoumise	François Sandoz	21.53%	N/A	No
Vaucluse (3)		Parti communiste français	Muriel Duenas	19.16%	N/A	No
Vaucluse (4)		La France insoumise	Tourkia Galvez	18.14%	N/A	No
Vaucluse (5)		Génération.s	Céline Celse	22.26%	N/A	No
Vendée (1)		Europe Écologie Les Verts	Lucie Etonno	24.16%	43.26%	No
Vendée (2)		La France insoumise	Nicolas Hélary	21.84%	41.58%	No
Vendée (3)		La France insoumise	Aurélien Mauger	17.45%	N/A	No
Vendée (4)		Parti communiste français	Valentin Rondeau	17.58%	N/A	No
Vendée (5)		La France insoumise	Timothée Tibaud	20.12%	N/A	No
Vienne (1)		Europe Écologie Les Verts	Lisa Belluco	32.56%	51.36%	Yes
Vienne (2)		La France insoumise	Valérie Soumaille	34.39%	48.81%	No
Vienne (3)		La France insoumise	Jason Valente	20.61%	N/A	No
Vienne (4)		Parti socialiste	Flavien Cartier	23.11%	N/A	No
Haute-Vienne (1)		La France insoumise	Damien Maudet	34.54%	53.41%	Yes
Haute-Vienne (2)		Parti socialiste	Stéphane Delautrette	35.58%	61.47%	Yes
Haute-Vienne (3)		La France insoumise	Manon Meunier	31.68%	51.10%	Yes
Vosges (1)		La France insoumise	Jules Fetet	18.67%	N/A	No
Vosges (2)		La France insoumise	Charlotte Moreau	17.84%	N/A	No
Vosges (3)		Europe Écologie Les Verts	Béatrice Pierrat	17.68%	N/A	No
Vosges (4)		La France insoumise	François-Xavier Wein	15.97%	N/A	No
Yonne (1)		Europe Écologie Les Verts	Florence Loury	24.25%	48.90%	No
Yonne (2)		La France insoumise	Philippe Veyssiere	21.32%	N/A	No
Yonne (3)		La France insoumise	Manon Dené	19.18%	N/A	No
Territoire de Belfort (1)		La France insoumise	Gérald Loridat	21.24%	N/A	No
Territoire de Belfort (2)		La France insoumise	Florian Chauche	26.42%	51.37%	Yes
Essonne (1)		La France insoumise	Farida Amrani	39.12%	59.84%	Yes
Essonne (2)		La France insoumise	Mathieu Hillaire	24.66%	46.73%	No
Essonne (3)		Europe Écologie Les Verts	Steevy Gustave	28.72%	48.82%	No
Essonne (4)		Parti communiste français	Amadou Démé	27.49%	44.25%	No
Essonne (5)		Génération écologie	Cédric Villani (incumbent)	38.20%	49.97%	No
Essonne (6)		Parti socialiste	Jérôme Guedj	38.31%	53.36%	Yes
Essonne (7)		La France insoumise	Claire Lejeune	35.03%	49.66%	No
Essonne (8)		La France insoumise	Émilie Chazette-Guillet	30.50%	42.74%	No
Essonne (9)		Europe Écologie Les Verts	Nadhéra Beletreche	32.44%	48.73%	No
Essonne (10)		La France insoumise	Antoine Léaument	37.27%	55.21%	Yes
Hauts-de-Seine (1)		Parti communiste français	Elsa Faucillon (incumbent)	54.26%	70.17%	Yes
Hauts-de-Seine (2)		Europe Écologie Les Verts	Francesca Pasquini	27.41%	35.55%	Yes
Hauts-de-Seine (3)		La France insoumise	Sara Tij	23.10%	24.73%	No
Hauts-de-Seine (4)		Europe Écologie Les Verts	Sabrina Sebaihi	36.00%	51.00%	Yes
Hauts-de-Seine (5)		La France insoumise	Léa Druet	28.78	40.27%	No
Hauts-de-Seine (6)		La France insoumise	Julie Barbaux	15.47%	25.81%	No
Hauts-de-Seine (7)		La France insoumise Révolution écologique pour le vivant	Sandro Rato	18.42%	29.74%	No
Hauts-de-Seine (8)		La France insoumise	Annie Laroque-Conoy	24.25%	34.25%	No
Hauts-de-Seine (9)		Europe Écologie Les Verts	Pauline Rapilly Ferniot	17.63%	N/A	No
Hauts-de-Seine (10)		Parti socialiste	Cécile Soubelet	30.75%	40.15%	No
Hauts-de-Seine (11)		La France insoumise	Aurélien Saintoul	23.11%	54.76%	Yes
Hauts-de-Seine (12)		La France insoumise	Cathy Thomas	29.72%	42.47%	No
Hauts-de-Seine (13)		Parti socialiste	Brice Gaillard	27.91%	40.89%	No
Seine-Saint-Denis (1)		La France insoumise	Éric Coquerel (incumbent)	53.79%	71.69%	Yes
Seine-Saint-Denis (2)		Parti communiste français	Stéphane Peu (incumbent)	62.85%	78.70%	Yes
Seine-Saint-Denis (3)		La France insoumise	Thomas Portes	34.06%	53.96%	Yes
Seine-Saint-Denis (4)		Parti communiste français	Soumya Bourouaha	36.13%	N/A (Note: This candidate was elected after their second-round opponent withdrew.)	Yes
Seine-Saint-Denis (5)		La France insoumise	Raquel Garrido	37.90%	53.50%	Yes
Seine-Saint-Denis (6)		La France insoumise	Bastien Lachaud (incumbent)	56.61%	75.40%	Yes
Seine-Saint-Denis (7)		La France insoumise	Alexis Corbière (incumbent)	62.94%	N/A	Yes
Seine-Saint-Denis (8)		Parti socialiste	Fatiha Keloua-Hachi	35.31%	53.57%	Yes
Seine-Saint-Denis (9)		La France insoumise	Aurélie Trouvé	53.53%	69.24%	Yes
Seine-Saint-Denis (10)		La France insoumise	Nadège Abomangoli	39.71%	55.53%	Yes
Seine-Saint-Denis (11)		La France insoumise	Clémentine Autain (incumbent)	46.15%	N/A	Yes
Seine-Saint-Denis (12)		La France insoumise	Jérôme Legavre	30.83%	51.11%	Yes
Val-de-Marne (1)		La France insoumise	Thierry Guintrand	27.84%	40.91%	No
Val-de-Marne (2)		La France insoumise	Clémence Guetté	47.46%	64.20%	Yes
Val-de-Marne (3)		La France insoumise	Louis Boyard	31.57%	51.98%	Yes
Val-de-Marne (4)		La France insoumise	Mirabelle Lemaire	29.65%	44.02%	No
Val-de-Marne (5)		Parti communiste français	Julien Léger	31.58%	43.53%	No
Val-de-Marne (6)		Europe Écologie Les Verts	May Bouhada	36.26%	45.64%	No
Val-de-Marne (7)		La France insoumise	Rachel Kéké	37.22%	50.30%	Yes
Val-de-Marne (8)		La France insoumise	Erik Pages	28.16%	36.73%	No
Val-de-Marne (9)		Parti socialiste	Isabelle Santiago (incumbent)	48.27%	67.25%	Yes
Val-de-Marne (10)		La France insoumise	Mathilde Panot (incumbent)	54.84%	67.63%	Yes
Val-de-Marne (11)		Génération.s	Sophie Taillé-Polian	48.83%	63.32%	Yes
Val-d'Oise (1)		La France insoumise	Leïla Ivorra	28.20%	47.47%	No
Val-d'Oise (2)		La France insoumise	Sylvie Geoffroy-Martin	27.10%	46.75%	No
Val-d'Oise (3)		Génération écologie	Carine Pelegrin	28.96%	47.84%	No
Val-d'Oise (4)		La France insoumise	Karine Lacouture	30.67%	46.57%	No
Val-d'Oise (5)		La France insoumise	Paul Vannier	44.80%	63.71%	Yes
Val-d'Oise (6)		La France insoumise	Gabrielle Cathala	29.84%	46.53%	No
Val-d'Oise (7)		Parti socialiste	Romain Eskenazi	31.59%	49.63%	No
Val-d'Oise (8)		La France insoumise	Carlos Bilongo	37.10%	61.72%	Yes
Val-d'Oise (9)		La France insoumise	Arnaud Le Gall	29.13%	56.42%	Yes
Val-d'Oise (10)		Les Nouveaux Démocrates	Aurélien Taché (incumbent)	32.85%	55.76%	Yes
Martinique (1)		N/A	No NUPES candidate (Note: NUPES did not invest a candidate in this constituency.)	-	-	-
Martinique (2)		N/A	No NUPES candidate	-	-	-
Martinique (3)		La France Insoumise	Theirry Renard	13.90%	N/A	No
Martinique (4)		Péyi-A	Jean-Philippe Nilor (incumbent)	43.99%	71.40%	Yes
Guadeloupe (1)		N/A	No NUPES candidate (Note: NUPES did not invest a candidate in any of Guadeloupe's constituencies.)	-	-	-
Guadeloupe (2)		N/A	No NUPES candidate	-	-	-
Guadeloupe (3)		N/A	No NUPES candidate	-	-	-
Guadeloupe (4)		N/A	No NUPES candidate (Note: Élie Califer, candidate for the Plural Left elected in the first round, claims to be a member of NUPES but was not listed on any official lists of NUPES candidates.)	-	-	-
Guyane (1)	-	N/A	No NUPES candidate (Note: NUPES did not invest a candidate in either of French Guiana's constituencies.)	-	-	-
Guyane (2)	-	N/A	No NUPES candidate	-	-	-
Réunion (1)		Parti socialiste	Philippe Naillet (incumbent)	33.47%	60.68%	Yes
Réunion (2)		Pour La Réunion	Karine Lebon (incumbent)	42.89%	69.40%	Yes
Réunion (3)		La France insoumise	Alex Chaussalet	16.57%	N/A	No
Réunion (4)		La France Insoumise	Emeline K/Bidi	36.11%	61.33%	Yes
Réunion (5)		La France Insoumise; Rézistans Égalité 974	Jean-Hugues Ratenon (incumbent)	36.38%	62.81%	Yes
Réunion (6)		Divers gauche	Frédéric Maillot	23.88%	52.99%	Yes
Réunion (7)		La France Insoumise	Perceval Gaillard	20.82%	51.24%	Yes
Saint-Pierre-et-Miquelon (1)		La France Insoumise	Olivier Gaston	29.59%	49.66%	No
Mayotte (1)		Pôle écologiste – Divers gauche	Yasmina Aouny	8.54%	N/A	No
Mayotte (2)		Pôle écologiste – Divers gauche	Ali Djaroudi	4.94%	N/A	No
Saint Barthélemy and Saint-Martin (1)		N/A	No NUPES candidate	-	-	-
Wallis and Futuna (1)		N/A	No NUPES candidate	-	-	-
French Polynesia (1)		Tavini Huiraatira	Temata'i Le Gayic	20.10%	50.88%	Yes
French Polynesia (2)		Tavini Huiraatira	Steve Chailloux	28.78%	58.90%	Yes
French Polynesia (3)		Tavini Huiraatira	Moetai Brotherson (incumbent)	34.26%	62.90%	Yes
New Caledonia (1)		N/A	No NUPES candidate (Note: NUPES did not invest a candidate in either of New Caledonia's constituencies.)	-	-	-
New Caledonia (2)		N/A	No NUPES candidate	-	-	-
French Overseas Citizens (1)		La France insoumise	Florence Roger	33.43%	44.37%	No
French Overseas Citizens (2)		La France insoumise	Christian Rodriguez	28.20%	42.58%	No
French Overseas Citizens (3)		Europe Écologie Les Verts	Charlotte Minvielle	31.46%	44.20%	No
French Overseas Citizens (4)		Parti socialiste	Cécilia Gondard	32.47%	44.85%	No
French Overseas Citizens (5)		Europe Écologie Les Verts	Renaud Le Berre	27.89%	42.74%	No
French Overseas Citizens (6)		La France insoumise	Magali Mangin	20.28%	35.03%	No
French Overseas Citizens (7)		La France insoumise	Asma Rharmaoui-Claquin	26.06%	39.79%	No
French Overseas Citizens (8)		La France insoumise	Isabelle Rivolet	18.84%	N/A	No
French Overseas Citizens (9)		Génération.s	Karim Ben Cheïkh	39.99%	54.07%	Yes
French Overseas Citizens (10)		La France insoumise	Chantal Moussa	22.54%	36.42%	No
French Overseas Citizens (11)		Parti communiste français	Dominique Vidal	24.79%	38.27%	No

=== Dissident candidates ===
A number of candidates, mostly from the PS, announced their intention to stand for election even against a NUPES-backed candidate. Xavier Perrin, a PS candidate in Loire-Atlantique's 8th constituency, said he would remain a candidate against Matthias Tavel of La France Insoumise and NUPES. The four PS candidates in Dordogne also announced they would remain in the campaign despite the appointment of non-PS NUPES candidates in their constituencies. Michèle Picard, the PCF candidate in Rhône's 14th constituency, declared that she would continue her candidacy despite the appointment of another NUPES candidate, Taha Bouhafs. After a PS dissident entered the same race, Bouhafs withdrew, and Picard hoped to become the official NUPES candidate. Picard eventually withdrew from the race and supported the alternative LFI candidate. Lamia El Aaraje, the PS incumbent in Paris's 15th constituency, also announced that she was proceeding with her candidacy despite the appointment of NUPES candidate Danielle Simonnet. PS incumbent Sylvie Tolmont stood in Sarthe's 4th constituency.

As of 10 June, there were six EELV dissident candidates, 62 PS dissident candidates—including two PS dissidents in the same constituency—and 11 PCF dissident candidates running against NUPES-endorsed candidates. There were also four LFI dissidents running against NUPES candidates, including incumbent Muriel Ressiguier. Overall, the dissident candidates, especially from the PS, performed poorly in the first round of the election; only 15 dissident candidates, of the over 70 running, qualified for the second round, mainly from rural constituencies and overseas.

Patrick Mennucci, member of the PS minority current Debout socialiste and an opponent of the NUPES accord, said that the result proved that "if the PS had led its game out of NUPES, it would have had at least as many deputies, and perhaps more voters, those who could not bring themselves to vote [LFI]. All this, without being in the hands of LFI." Despite criticism of Mélenchon on the evening of the first round, Delga announced her support for NUPES candidates in second-round elections where dissident candidates were not present. In response to Delga, Narassiguin said the result of the first round marked "the failure of those who had campaigned on the theme 'NUPES is not my left'. They are seen as dividers." Philippe Doucet, a NUPES opponent within the PS, said that "the dynamics of [NUPES] are strong", that dissidents "did not play much", and the legislative elections "have become totally presidential". He added that he feared the second round would become an "anti-Mélenchon referendum", which in his view would harm PS candidates.

== Ideology and platform ==
The coalition has been characterised as leftist. The participants share several proposals, including the increase in the minimum wage after tax to €1,500 per month, the return to retirement at 60, the freezing of the prices of basic necessities, ecological development, and the establishment of a Sixth Republic (France being in its Fifth Republic). The coalition aims to obtain a majority in the National Assembly in order to impose cohabitation on President Emmanuel Macron and to have Jean-Luc Mélenchon appointed as prime minister. Some PS members regarded participation in the European Union as a "red line" and a compromise was reached, with the coalition embracing a "common goal" of changing the European Union from a "liberal and productivist" project to one "in the service of ... ecology and solidarity".

Members of the coalition have pledged to jointly support 95% of the programme's proposals once in the parliament, while for the remaining 5%, particularly on the nuclear issue, they are given independence. 170 economists signed a letter in support of the union's economic programme.

== Electoral history ==
=== Legislative elections ===
National Assembly
Election year	Leader	First round		Second round		Seats	Role in government
Election year	Leader	Votes	%	Votes	%	Seats	Role in government
2022	Jean-Luc Mélenchon	5,857,364	25.7	6,556,198	31.6	131 / 577	Opposition

== Reactions ==
While the French Left hailed the negotiations as historic, it was not without criticism for the coalition's perceived Euroscepticism and an alleged break from the Third Way positions of the presidency of François Hollande. Libération criticised the coalition for its perceived Euroscepticism, calling such positions "a historical mistake" and arguing that "the Left must proclaim loud and clear its commitment to the European Union". L'Humanité praised the coalition as "a historical rally".

According to an Elabe survey commissioned by BFM TV, 84% of left-leaning people supported NUPES. A number of French economists, such as Julia Cagé, Bernard Friot, and Thomas Piketty, also reacted favorably to the union and its economic programme, and published a column in support on Le Journal du Dimanche.

=== PS majority and social-democratic left ===
Many PS mayors have supported NUPES and called for the PS to join the alliance. Nantes mayor Johanna Rolland attributed the failure of the PS and the left, including La France Insoumise (LFI), to reach the second round in the 2022 French presidential election to the PS's failure to form a union with LFI. Among other PS mayors, Nathalie Appéré (Rennes), Benoît Arrivé (Cherbourg-en-Cotentin), Olivier Bianchi (Clermont-Ferrand), Mathieu Klein (Nancy), Benoît Payan (Marseille), Nicolas Mayer-Rossignol (Rouen), and Cédric Van Styvendael (Villeurbanne) published a forum expressing their support for NUPES while reaffirming a "deep attachment to the idea" of European integration. Lille mayor Martine Aubry called on the PS to join NUPES, whilst stating that it does not "correspond in all respects to [her] deep convictions". Such support for a union with LFI was accused by the right wing of the PS to have gone against the economic positions of François Hollande, the PS former president of France, and Bernard Cazeneuve, the PS former prime minister of France. During the party's National Council on 5 May, the agreement was ratified and the PS joined NUPES. At the event, many PS personalities approved the union, notably Christophe Clergeau, Corinne Narassiguin, and Laurence Rossignol. Olivier Faure, the PS First-Secretary, welcomed the accord.

André Laignel, the vice-president of the Association of Mayors of France, claimed that the traditional centre-left parties (PS and EELV) represent greater local support than their results in the 2022 presidential election showed. He encouraged a union between the PS and other forces of the left, stating that "it is clear that if the left is not united, it is going to be defeated". 2007 presidential candidate Ségolène Royal said she supported NUPES, acknowledging LFI's hegemony on the left; she criticised the disunity of the left at the time of the presidential election, arguing that it was a "lack of responsibility", and called for a tactical vote for Mélenchon. Stéphane Troussel, the PS president of the Departmental Council of Seine-Saint-Denis, condemned disunity and called for the PS to join NUPES; he said that not finding an agreement would be a mistake. 1995 presidential candidate Lionel Jospin said he supported NUPES, but wished the nomination in the 15th arrondissement of Paris to go to the outgoing PS deputy Lamia El Aaraje.

Journalist and Place Publique politician Raphaël Glucksmann announced his support for NUPES, arguing that he wanted to avoid a majority of President Emmanuel Macron's La République En Marche! (LREM), which formed Ensemble Citoyens, and of the National Rally (RN). While noting the disagreements with LFI, he said he would do "everything so that the maximum number of solidarity, humanist, and environmentalist voices can be heard from this summer in the Assembly". New Deal withdrew all of its candidates and declared its support for NUPES.

=== PS minority and opposition ===
According to Le Monde, disapproval and dissension to join NUPES have represented a minority in the PS, and are due to political figures from previous currents of the party, in particular those close to Hollande, commonly called the "Elephants of the Socialist Party"; centrist dissent was driven by regional success against LFI and primarily represented by Carole Delga, the president of Occitania, and Anne Hidalgo, the PS mayor of Paris and 2022 presidential candidate. The press often called the opponents to the agreement the "new slingers", an expression taken up by Stéphane Le Foll, who stated that if the PS "continues to be what it is today, I will leave". He said that he does not believe in a victory for NUPES at the 2022 French legislative election; for him, it is "a fable, ... a decoy", claiming that by negotiating with LFI, the PS is "turning its back on its entire history".

At the start of negotiations with the PS, François Hollande evoked the risk of the erasure of the PS, saying that the agreement was not acceptable and that it "calls into question the very principles which are the foundations of socialist commitment". Mélenchon responded by saying that "while the train of history is passing, he remains at the track". Hollande called any union of the PS and LFI "unacceptable", leading Mélenchon to call Hollande a "total has-been". Speaking to Hollande on a TV plateau, TV host Patrick Cohen contested Holland's claims, reminding him that the PS's historical positions, under François Mitterrand and Lionel Jospin, were always marked by a line of rupture and challenge to the European treaties, stating that NUPES does not "break with the tradition of the PS... but turns its back on François Hollande's five-year term".

Approximately 1.000 members of the Socialist Party called for Olivier Faure to end negotiations. Anne Hidalgo lobbied against the union and called for a union excluding Mélenchon. Former prime minister Bernard Cazeneuve announced his resignation from the party on 3 May 2022 due to the negotiations. In the wake of the PS joining the union, Carole Delga claimed that she would support "independent socialists" who ran against non-PS NUPES candidates. As part of the NUPES accord, the PS received six seats out of the 49 in Occitania, which Delga believed was not a "fair representation" for the party in the region.

In an open letter, Guillaume Lacroix of the centrist Radical Party of the Left announced that it would not join the coalition, while denouncing the negotiations, claiming that this event marked "the death of the social-democratic left". The Movement of Progressives, formerly part of the Ecologist Pole, was also opposed to the agreement, stating: "negotiating with FI constitute an intolerable betrayal by irresponsible apparatchiks".

=== Extra-parliamentary left ===
The far-leftist New Anticapitalist Party reacted negatively to the PS's potential inclusion in the union, stating that it does not believe the PS is a force of social change; the party failed to negotiate an agreement with NUPES and ran its own candidates separately, whilst supporting the union's more left leaning candidates. Opposition also came from the Trotskyist party Lutte Ouvrière, which announced that the party would run its own candidates separate from NUPES, and accused the union of reformism.

=== Presidential majority ===
François Bayrou commented that this agreement was "an extremely sad event", citing the pact's perceived Euroscepticism, which according to him would lead to "the end of Europe", and Mélenchon's desire to leave NATO. LREM deputies, in particular Aurore Bergé and Sacha Houlié, were critical of NUPES. LREM members seek to discredit NUPES by highlighting the heterogeneity of their ideological positions. While hoping that LFI could serve as a foil for pro-European voters who could then mobilize for LREM, they regretted the union, considering its "undeniable power in the first round", and recalled that they had benefited from the left's disunity in certain constituencies in the 2017 French legislative election. Stanislas Guerini, general delegate of Renaissance and Ensemble Citoyens of the presidential majority, made an appeal to PS members opposed to the union, asking them to "join us".

After the first round, having criticized Mélenchon for calling on voters not to vote for Marine Le Pen (instead of a full-endorsement of Macron) in the 2022 French presidential election, the presidential majority faced a choice in votes between left-wing and far-right candidates. Party officials said they would decide on a "case-by-case basis". Élisabeth Borne, Prime Minister of France, said: "Our position is not a single vote for the RN". At the same time, she expressed support only for NUPES candidates who, according to her, respect republican values.

== See also ==
- Popular Front (France)
- Republican Front (France)
- Programme commun
- Union of the Left (France)
- Greens and Left Alliance, political alliance in Italy inspired by NUPES
- People's Union (Italy), political alliance in Italy inspired by NUPES
