= Christian Girard =

French politician (born 1952)

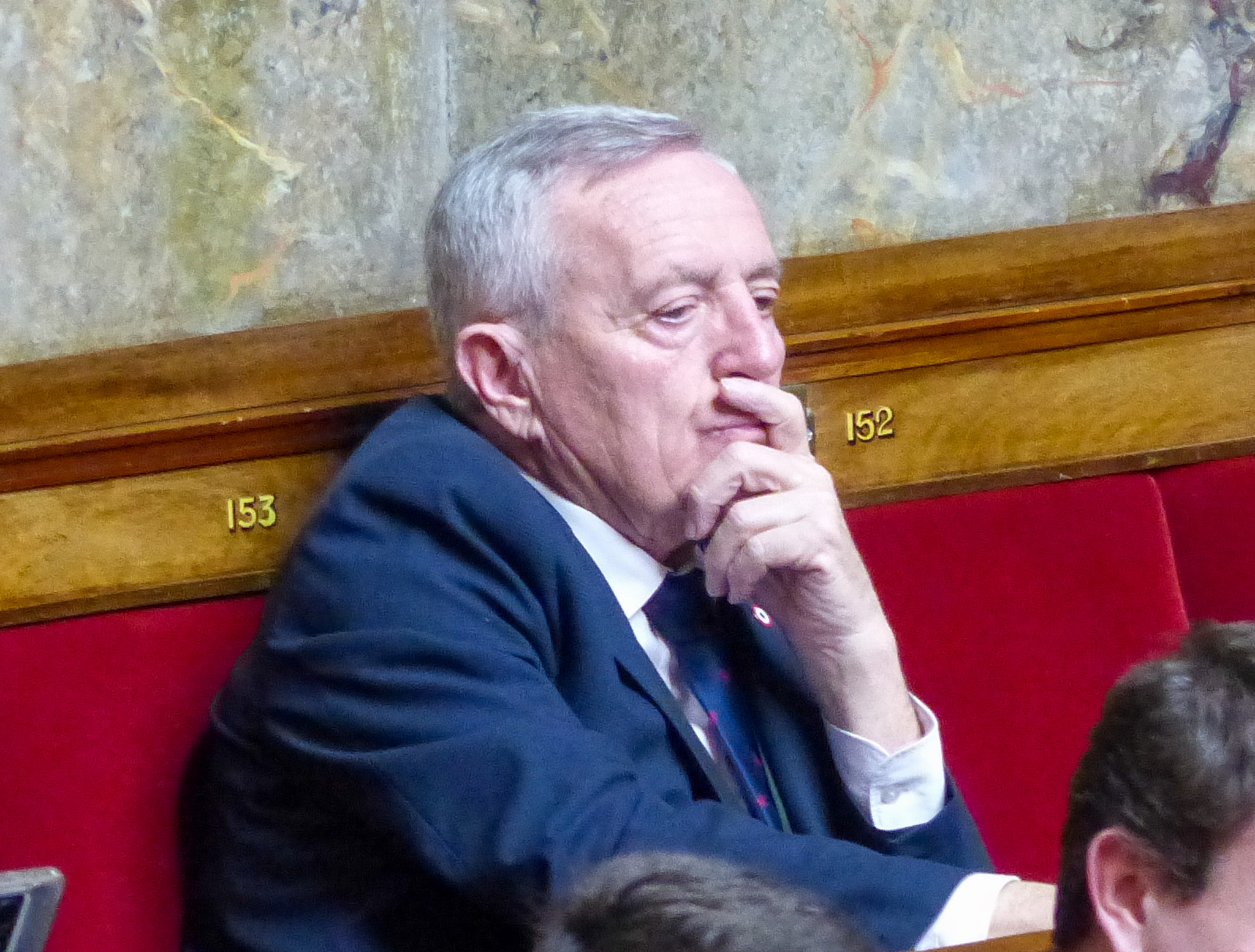
- Girard in 2026

Member of the National Assembly for Alpes-de-Haute-Provence's 1st constituency
- Incumbent
- Assumed office 22 June 2022
- Preceded by: Delphine Bagarry

Member of the Regional Council of Provence-Alpes-Côte d'Azur
- Incumbent
- Assumed office 1 July 2021
- President: Renaud Muselier

Personal details
- Born: 7 May 1952 (age 73) Manosque, France
- Party: National Rally
- Other political affiliations: UMP

Christian Girard (French pronunciation: [kʁistjɑ̃ ʒiʁaʁ]; born 7 May 1952) is a French politician who has represented the 1st constituency of the Alpes-de-Haute-Provence department in the National Assembly since 2022. A member of the National Rally (RN), he has also held a seat in the Regional Council of Provence-Alpes-Côte d'Azur since 2021. In Parliament, Girard sits on the Committee on National Defence and the Armed Forces.

In the 2017 legislative election, he ran for the National Assembly in Alpes-de-Haute-Provence's 2nd constituency, placing third. In 2021, Girard, who has been departmental party leader since 2018, unsuccessfully ran for the Departmental Council of Alpes-de-Haute-Provence in the canton of Manosque-1.

== See also ==
- List of deputies of the 16th National Assembly of France
- List of deputies from Alpes-de-Haute-Provence
