= Aurélien Taché =

French politician

Member of the National Assembly for Val-d'Oise's 10th constituency
- Incumbent
- Assumed office 21 June 2017
- Preceded by: Dominique Lefebvre

Personal details
- Born: 26 May 1984 (age 42) Niort, France
- Party: LFI (since 2024)
- Other political affiliations: PS (2002–2017); LREM (2017–2020); ND (2020–2022); EÉLV (2022–2024)
- Education: University of Limoges

Aurélien Taché (French pronunciation: [oʁeljɛ̃ taʃe]; born 26 May 1984) is a French politician who was elected to the French National Assembly on 18 June 2017, representing the department of Val-d'Oise. He was elected in 2017 as a member of La République En Marche! (LREM) but left the party in 2020, and joined the short-lived Ecology Democracy Solidarity group, then The New Democrats. In 2022, he was re-elected as a New Democrat, as part of the NUPES group.

== Political career ==
In parliament, Taché serves on the Committee on Social Affairs, where was his parliamentary group's coordinator from 2017 until 2018, and the Finance Committee. In addition to his committee assignments, he is part of the French-Tunisian Parliamentary Friendship Group and the French-Ukrainian Parliamentary Friendship Group.

Led by Taché, Hugues Renson and Matthieu Orphelin, around 20 members of the LREM parliamentary group established a sub-group in late 2018 with a "wish to express a humanist, social and ecological sensibility and to better raise citizens' concerns"; the initiative was widely interpreted as the launch of a left-wing faction within the group. In May 2020, he joined seven lawmakers in leaving LREM to join the new Ecology, Democracy, Solidarity group, depriving the president of an outright majority and raising pressure for more left-wing policies. and joined the Ecology Democracy Solidarity group. By June, he and five other ex-LREM deputies announced establishment of #Nous Demain, a "humanist, ecologist and feminist" political movement. He then joined The New Democrats.

== Political positions ==
Taché was considered a close ally of President Emmanuel Macron.

In May 2018, Taché co-sponsored an initiative in favour of a bioethics law extending to homosexual and single women free access to fertility treatments such as in vitro fertilisation (IVF) under France's national health insurance; it was one of Macron's campaign promises and marked the president's first major social reform of his five-year term.

In early 2018, Taché was one of several LREM members who joined an informal parliamentary working group on Islam set up by Florent Boudié in order to contribute to the government's bill aimed at better organising and supervising the financing of the Muslim faith in France. In 2019, he was one of five members of the LREM parliamentary group who joined a cross-party initiative to legalize the distribution and use of cannabis.

Ahead of the Green movement's primaries in 2021, Taché endorsed Éric Piolle as the movement's candidate for the French presidential election in 2022.

In 2022, he was re-elected as a New Democrat, as part of the NUPES group.

== Controversy ==
In October 2019, Taché publicly criticized his fellow LREM member and Minister of Education Jean-Michel Blanquer in an interview with Le Point over the latter's opposition to a woman's right to wear a hijab when accompanying school children. As a consequence, Blanquer issued a complaint against Taché at the LREM leadership and asked for a sanctions to be imposed on him.

In April 2021, Taché was denied access to the international zone of Charles de Gaulle Airport when he wanted to meet a group of Algerian nationals who had been stranded at the airport for a month and a half because of the COVID-19 pandemic.

In December 2022, Taché was criticised for interrupting a play about former president François Mitterrand.

== See also ==
- 2017 French legislative election
