= Dominique Lefebvre =

French politician

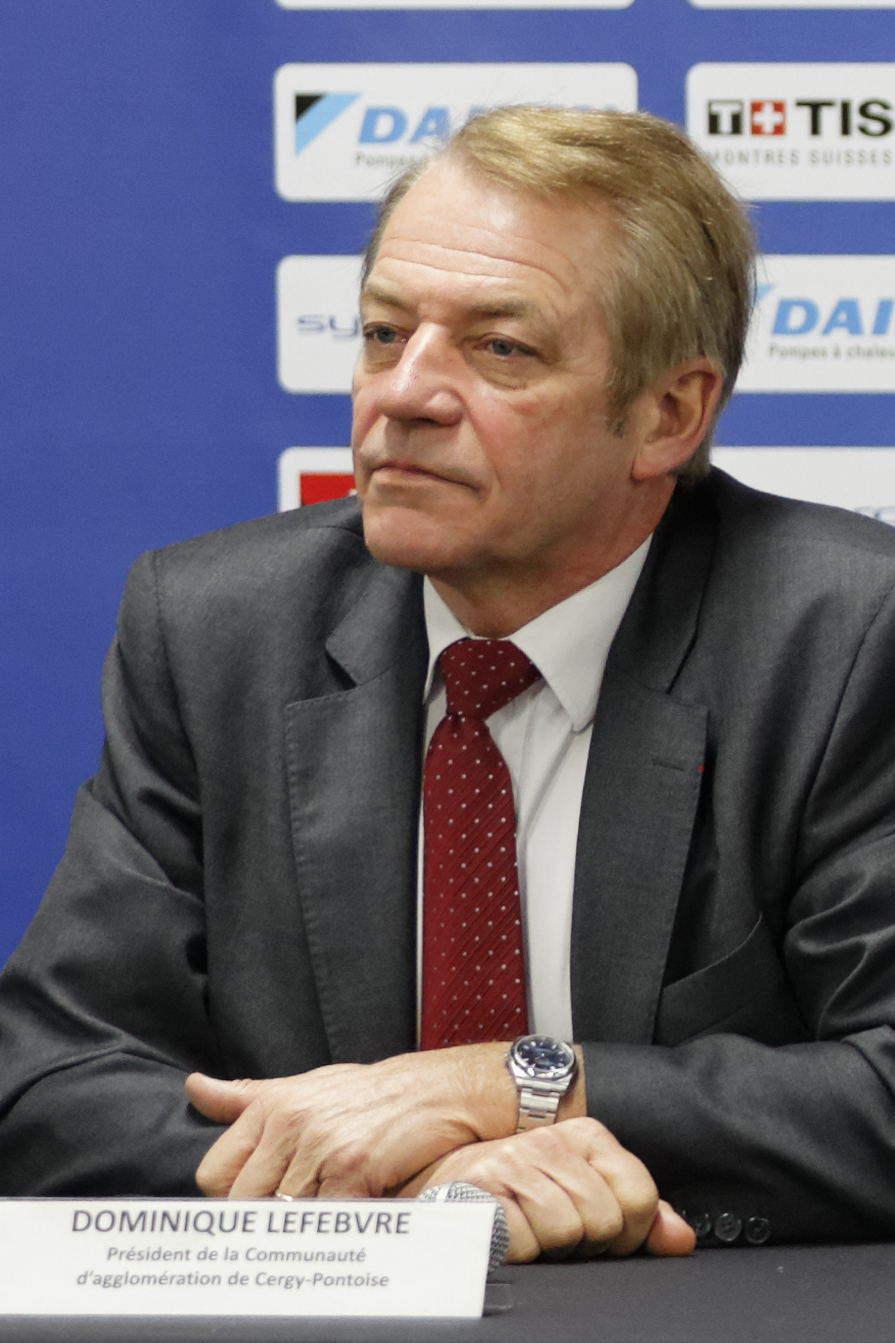
- Dominique Lefebvre in February 2014
- Parliamentary group: Socialist

Deputy for Val-d'Oise's 10th constituency in the National Assembly of France
- In office 2012–2017
- Preceded by: new constituency
- Succeeded by: Aurélien Taché

Personal details
- Born: May 7, 1956 (age 70) Roubaix (Nord)
- Party: Socialist
- Education: École nationale d'administration

Dominique Lefebvre is a French politician. He was the first deputy for Val-d'Oise's 10th constituency, which was established in the 2010 redistricting of French legislative constituencies. He served from 2012 until 2017.
