= Jean-Louis Bianco =

French politician (born 1943)

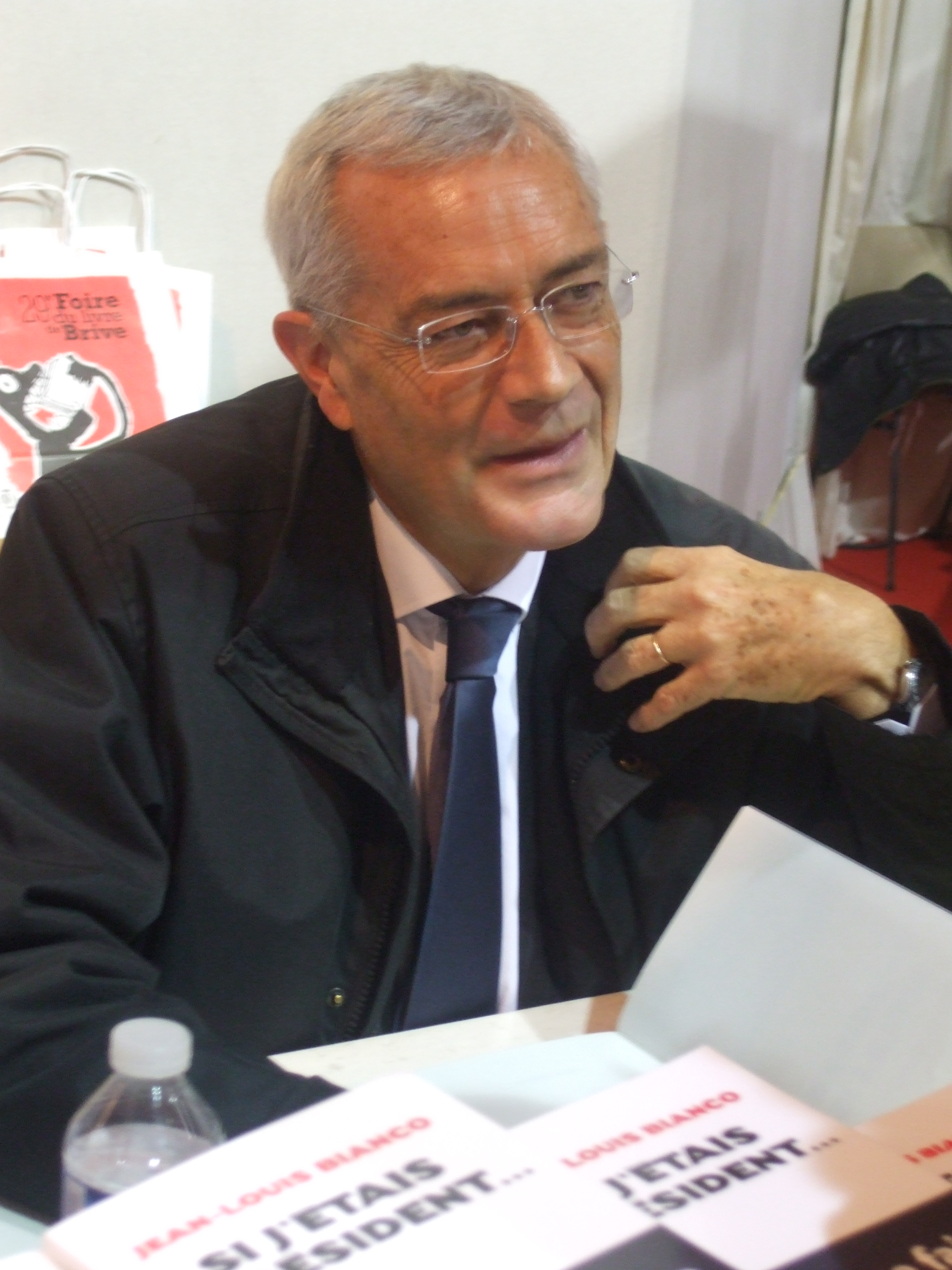
- Bianco at the 2010 Brive-la-Gaillarde Book Fair

President of the General Council of Alpes-de-Haute-Provence
- In office 27 March 1998 – 1 October 2012
- Preceded by: Pierre Rinaldi
- Succeeded by: Gilbert Sauvan

Member of the National Assembly for Alpes-de-Haute-Provence's 1st constituency
- In office 12 June 1997 – 19 June 2012
- Preceded by: Francis Galizi
- Succeeded by: Gilbert Sauvan

Mayor of Digne-les-Bains
- In office 21 June 1995 – 18 March 2001
- Preceded by: Pierre Rinaldi
- Succeeded by: Serge Gloaguen

Minister of Equipment, Transport and Housing
- In office 4 April 1992 – 29 March 1993
- Prime Minister: Pierre Bérégovoy
- Preceded by: Paul Quilès
- Succeeded by: Bernard Bosson (Equipment and Transport); Hervé de Charette (Housing)

Minister of Social Affairs and Integration
- In office 17 May 1991 – 2 April 1992
- Prime Minister: Édith Cresson
- Preceded by: Claude Évin
- Succeeded by: René Teulade

Chief of Staff to the President of France
- In office 29 June 1982 – 15 May 1991
- President: François Mitterrand
- Preceded by: Pierre Bérégovoy
- Succeeded by: Hubert Védrine

Personal details
- Born: 12 January 1943 (age 83) Neuilly-sur-Seine, France
- Party: Socialist Party
- Education: Lycée Janson-de-Sailly
- Alma mater: Sciences Po; Mines ParisTech; École nationale d'administration

Jean-Louis Bianco (born 12 January 1943) is a French politician and civil servant who served as Minister of Social Affairs and Integration from 1991 to 1992 and Minister of Equipment, Transport and Housing from 1992 to 1993 under President François Mitterrand. A member of the Socialist Party (PS), he was later elected to the National Assembly in 1997, where he represented the 1st constituency of Alpes-de-Haute-Provence for three terms. Bianco also held a number of local elective mandates at the municipal, departmental and regional level from 1992 to 2012.

== Early career ==
Bianco is of Italian descent through his father who fled Italian Fascism. An alumnus of the École nationale d'administration, he joined the Conseil d'État in 1971 with the rank of auditor. In 1978 he was his appointed master of requests. In 1994, he was made a councillor. Bianco also served as president of the National Forests Office (ONF) from 1985 to 1991.

== Political career ==
Appointed chargé de mission at the Élysée in 1981, Bianco became President François Mitterrand's chief of staff in 1982, a role he retained until 1991, when he was named Minister of Social Affairs and Integration under Prime Minister Édith Cresson. In 1992, he was named Minister of Equipment, Transport and Housing under Prime Minister Pierre Bérégovoy. He left the position following the 1993 legislative election, as the right led by Jacques Chirac regained a parliamentary majority in the National Assembly.

As a member of the Socialist Party, he represented the 1st constituency of the Alpes-de-Haute-Provence department from 1997 to 2012. In Parliament, he sat with the Socialist, radical, citizen and miscellaneous left group.

== See also ==
- National Forests Office (France)
