= Émilie Cariou =

French politician (born 1971)

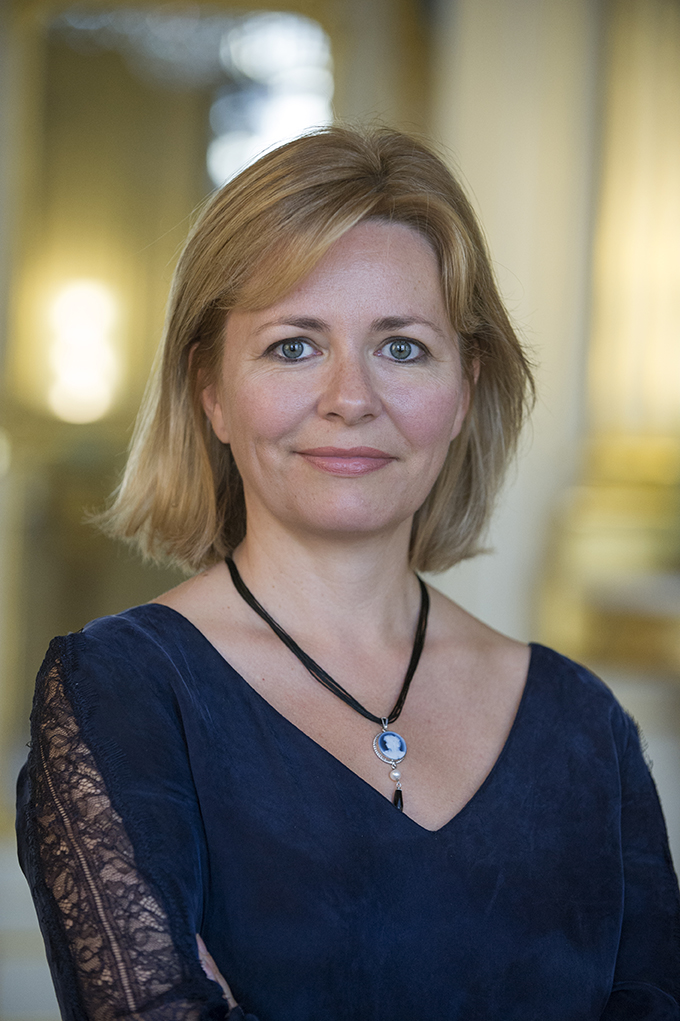

Member of the National Assembly for Meuse's 2nd constituency
- In office 2017–2022
- Preceded by: Jean-Louis Dumont

Personal details
- Born: 14 October 1971 (age 54) Verdun, France
- Party: Socialist (2011-??), La République En Marche! (??-2020), Ecology Democracy Solidarity (2020), The New Democrats (2020 onwards)

Émilie Cariou (French pronunciation: [emili kaʁju]; born 14 October 1971) is a French politician who served as a member of the French National Assembly for Meuse's 2nd constituency from 2017 to 2022. She was elected as a member of La République En Marche!, but left the party and in May 2020, she was one of the 17 initial members who formed the short-lived Ecology Democracy Solidarity group. Later in 2020, she joined some of these deputies in starting The New Democrats.

== Early career ==
Cariou spent most of her career at the Ministry of Economy and Finance, known as Bercy. At Bercy, she took part in the tax audit operations of major French industrial and banking groups within the National and International Audits Department (DVNI), then joined the Tax Legislation Department.

In 2011, Cariou joined Arnaud Montebourg's campaign for the Socialist Party's primaries ahead of the 2012 presidential elections, advising him on tax policy.

Following the 2012 elections, Cariou joined the cabinet of Fleur Pellerin, then Minister Delegate in charge of Small and Medium Enterprises, Innovation and the Digital Economy in the government of Prime Minister Manuel Valls; in this capacity, she advised the minister on the taxation of the Big Tech. Shortly afterwards, Cariou followed Fleur Pellerin to the Ministry of Culture and Communication, where she was in charge of copyright issues within the European Union. She retained her position when Audrey Azoulay was appointed Minister, with a mission extended to France's international partnerships.

In May 2014, Cariou became deputy director responsible for budget and financing at the National Centre for Cinema and the Moving Image (CNC).

== Political career ==
In parliament, Cariou served as member of the Finance Committee. In 2019, she succeeded Bénédicte Peyrol as her parliamentary group's coordinator on the committee. In addition to her committee assignments, she was a member of the Parliamentary Office for the Evaluation of Scientific and Technological Choices (OPECST).

In 2018, Cariou served as the parliament's rapporteur on reforming procedures for prosecuting tax offences.

In July 2019, Cariou announced her candidacy to succeed Carole Bureau-Bonnard as vice-president of the National Assembly; in an internal vote, she lost against Laëtitia Saint-Paul.

In May 2020, Cariou joined seven lawmakers in leaving the LREM parliamentary group to join the new Ecology, Democracy, Solidarity (EDS) group, depriving the president of an outright majority and raising pressure for more left-wing policies. By June, she and five other ex-LREM deputies announced the establishment of #Nous Demain, a "humanist, ecologist and feminist" political movement.

Later in 2020, she joined some of these deputies in starting The New Democrats.

== Political positions ==
In late 2017, Cariou was among those who campaigned, in light of the abolition of the solidarity tax on wealth (ISF), for an increase in the taxation of "external signs of wealth" (yachts, precious objects, sports cars).

In July 2019, Cariou voted in favor of the French ratification of the European Union’s Comprehensive Economic and Trade Agreement (CETA) with Canada.

== See also ==
- 2017 French legislative election
