= Delphine Bagarry =

French politician

Member of the National Assembly for Alpes-de-Haute-Provence's 1st constituency
- In office 21 June 2017 – 21 June 2022
- Preceded by: Gilbert Sauvan
- Succeeded by: Christian Girard

Personal details
- Born: 9 January 1970 (age 56) Lyon, France
- Party: La République En Marche! (2016-2020), Ecology Democracy Solidarity (2020), The New Democrats (2020 onwards)
- Profession: Physician

Delphine Bagarry (born 9 January 1970) is a French emergency physician and politician who was the National Assembly deputy for Alpes-de-Haute-Provence's 1st constituency from 2017 to 2022.

== Political career ==
Having previously been affiliated with the Socialist Party, Bagarry joined LREM in 2016.

In parliament, Bagarry served on the Committee on Sustainable Development and Spatial Planning. In addition to her committee assignments, she was part of the French-Vanuatu Parliamentary Friendship Group.

In 2018, Bagarry joined other co-signatories around Sébastien Nadot in officially filing a request for a commission of inquiry into the legality of French weapons sales to the Saudi-led coalition fighting in Yemen, days before an official visit of Saudi Crown Prince Mohammed bin Salman to Paris. In 2019, she was one of five members of the LREM parliamentary group who joined a cross-party initiative to legalize the distribution and use of cannabis.

In March 2020, Bagarry left LREM after Prime Minister Edouard Philippe announced he would push through a controversial pensions bill by executive decree. In May 2020, she was one of the 17 initial members of the short-lived Ecology Democracy Solidarity group. By June 2020, Bagarry and five other ex-LREM deputies announced the establishment of #Nous Demain, a "humanist, ecologist and feminist" political movement. In December 2020 she joined The New Democrats.

In the 2022 French legislative election, Bagarry stood as a NUPES candidate. She lost her seat in the second round to Christian Girard from the National Rally.

== See also ==
- 2017 French legislative election
