= Christophe Priou =

French politician

Christophe Priou (French pronunciation: [kʁistɔf pʁiju]; born 2 May 1958 in Nantes) is a French politician of The Republicans who served as a member of the National Assembly of France from 2002 until 2017, representing the Loire-Atlantique department.

In the Republicans’ 2016 presidential primaries, Priou endorsed François Fillon as the party's candidate for the office of President of France.
