= The New Democrats =

Political party in France

New Democrats Les Nouveaux Démocrates
- Abbreviation: LND
- Founded: 6 December 2020
- Dissolved: 16 October 2022
- Split from: La République En Marche!
- Merged into: The Ecologists
- Membership: 600
- Ideology: Social liberalism Environmentalism
- Political position: Centre-left

Website
- lesnouveaux-democrates.fr

The New Democrats (French: Les Nouveaux Démocrates, pronounced [le nuvo demɔkʁat]; LND) was a centre-left social liberal French political party that held pro-European views founded 16 December 2020 by parliamentarians elected in 2017 under the label of La République en Marche!. It was co-chaired by MPs Aurélien Taché and Émilie Cariou.

They had one MP sit in the National Assembly as NUPES in the Ecologist Pole.

== Members ==
- Aurélien Taché
- Émilie Cariou
- Guillaume Chiche
- Delphine Bagarry
- Sandrine Josso
- Fiona Lazaar

== Foundation ==
=== Ecology Democracy Solidarity parliamentary group ===
The idea of a dissident group of deputies from La République En Marche! was floated several times in the first few years of the 15th legislature, but a group didn't materialise. At the beginning of April 2020, in the context of the Covid-19 pandemic, the launch by 58 deputies, a senator and an MEP of a collaborative platform to develop a post-crisis plan, called The day after (French: Le jour d'après) was reported as the prelude to a split in the presidential majority in the Assembly from a new parliamentary group from its left wing and environmentalist, coordinated by the deputies Aurélien Taché, Paula Forteza and Matthieu Orphelin.

On 8 May 2020 Les Échos revealed a split project called Ecology Democracy Solidarity. Several deputies were dissuaded from joining the group by pressure from LREM. The Ecology Democracy Solidarity group was officially tabled on 19 May 2020 by seventeen parliamentarians. Among them, seven came directly from the majority group, nine had previously left or were excluded, and only one, Delphine Batho, was not a member.

=== Formation of New Democrats ===
In June 2020, the foundation of a #NousDemain "us tomorrow" party was announced by seven members of the Ecology Democracy Solidarity group (Delphine Bagarry, Émilie Cariou, Guillaume Chiche, Paula Forteza, Albane Gaillot, Hubert Julien-Laferrière and Aurélien Taché) and about twenty other personalities (including Sandrine Josso, a Member of Parliament who is not a member of the group), with an official launch scheduled for Autumn. This meant the EDS group no longer had a sufficient number of deputies in the assembly, so it was no longer listed in the assembly and its remaining members listed as independents (french, non-inscrits).

=== Ecological Pole ===
LND was part of the Ecologist Pole and NUPES for the 2022 French legislative election. Delphine Bagarry, the party's only Member of Parliament lost her seat to Christian Girard from the National Rally. On October 23, 2022, Taché announced that the party would be merging with Europe Ecology – The Greens.

== See also ==
- Ecology Democracy Solidarity
- La République En Marche!
