= Ecology Democracy Solidarity =

Parliamentary group in France

Ecology Democracy Solidarity group Groupe Écologie Democratie Solidarité
- Chamber: National Assembly
- Legislature(s): 15th (Fifth Republic)
- Foundation: 19 May 2020
- Dissolution: 17 October 2020
- Member parties: Ecology Generation; Movement of Progressives
- President: Paula Forteza; Matthieu Orphelin
- Vice presidents: Delphine Batho; Cédric Villani
- Ideology: Environmentalism
- Website: ecologie-democratie-solidarite.fr

Ecology Democracy Solidarity (French: Écologie Démocratie Solidarité) was a centre-left parliamentary group in the National Assembly of France. It was formed in May 2020 by members of La République En Marche!, a liberal parliamentary group. After losing three members in the span of two months, the group was forcibly dissolved in October 2020 because it didn’t have enough members. It then became The New Democrats.

== History ==
On 8 May 2020, Ecology Democracy Solidarity was announced as a new parliamentary group, planned to launch on 1 June 2020. At the time, it was said to have 58 members, but the anticipated number fell to 20 after intense pressure on potential defectors to stay in the La République En Marche group.

The group was officially formed on 19 May 2020 with 17 deputies, seven of which directly defected from La République En Marche! whereas nine had previously left it or been expelled from it. Delphine Batho, president of Ecology Generation and first elected as a Socialist Party deputy, also joined the group. The party's co-presidents were announced as Paula Forteza and Matthieu Orphelin, with Cédric Villani and Delphine Batho serving as vice-presidents.

Although La République En Marche! held a 313 deputies and a majority in the National Assembly after the 2017 French legislative election, previous defections had reduced their numbers and the formation of Ecology Democracy Solidarity left La République En Marche! with 288 seats, one short of a majority, although the governing coalition still held a majority. The group said it would be "independent" and sit "neither in the majority nor in the opposition".

After the departure of Sabine Thillaye to MoDem and Martine Wonner to the Liberties and Territories (LT) group, membership was down to 15 deputies, the minimum number for a National Assembly group. Jennifer de Temmerman announced her departure for LT on 16 October 2020. With insufficient deputies, the group was dissolved on 17 October 2020, and the remaining members were de facto independents (French: 'non-inscrits').

The New Democrats was founded in December 2020.

== Policy ==
The group launched with a 15-point manifesto, covering several green issues and inequality. Policies included a €5bn of funding for local authorities to use on green or social projects, tax reform and the possible restoration of France's wealth tax, a universal basic income, protection of animal rights, a constitutional commitment to climate preservation and biodiversity, compulsory paternity leave and the "reshoring" of industries in France and Europe.

== Historical membership ==
Year	Seats	Change	Notes
2020	17 / 577	Steady	
2020	16 / 577	▼1	
2020	15 / 577	▼1	

== Members ==
The group's members were:

- Delphine Bagarry
- Delphine Batho
- Émilie Cariou
- Annie Chapelier
- Guillaume Chiche
- Yolaine de Courson
- Paula Forteza
- Albane Gaillot
- Hubert Julien-Laferrière
- Sébastien Nadot
- Matthieu Orphelin
- Aurélien Taché
- Jennifer de Temmerman
- Sabine Thillaye
- Frédérique Tuffnell
- Cédric Villani
- Martine Wonner
