= Results of the 2024 French legislative election in Val-d'Oise =

Following the first round of the 2024 French legislative election on 30 June 2024, runoff elections in each constituency where no candidate received a vote share greater than 50 percent were scheduled for 7 July. Candidates permitted to stand in the runoff elections needed to either come in first or second place in the first round or achieve more than 12.5 percent of the votes of the entire electorate (as opposed to 12.5 percent of the vote share due to low turnout).

== Val-d'Oise ==
=== 1st constituency ===
Candidate	Party or alliance		First round		Second round	
Candidate	Party or alliance		Votes	%	Votes	%
Anne Sicard	National Rally		18,823	33.65	21,025	37.51
Maximillien Jules-Arthur	New Popular Front	La France Insoumise	17,230	30.80	20,534	36.63
Emilie Chandler	Ensemble	Renaissance	14,244	25.46	14,494	25.86
Michel Richard	The Republicans		3,468	6.20		
Barbara Géhan	Far-left	Lutte Ouvrière	826	1.48		
Lionel Lessaint	Sovereigntist right	Debout la France	755	1.35		
Laure de Garils	Reconquête		574	1.03		
Sami Lah	Independent		21	0.04		
Ethel Soussi	Far-left	Independent	0	0.00		
Total			55,941	100.00	56,053	100.00
Valid votes			55,941	97.33	56,053	97.11
Invalid votes			386	0.67	340	0.59
Blank votes			1,147	2.00	1,326	2.30
Total votes			57,474	100.00	57,719	100.00
Registered voters/turnout			84,016	68.41	84,034	68.69

=== 2nd constituency ===
Candidate	Party or alliance		First round		Second round	
Candidate	Party or alliance		Votes	%	Votes	%
Ayda Hadizadeh	New Popular Front	Socialist Party	17,221	33.47	28,342	59.51
Nadejda Remy	National Rally		15,544	30.21	19,281	40.49
Guillaume Vuilletet	Ensemble	Renaissance	13,044	25.35		
Frédéric Pain	The Republicans		3,214	6.25		
Brahim Oubairouk	Independent		818	1.59		
Alvin Ivanaj	Independent		621	1.21		
Philippe Chanzy	Reconquête		529	1.03		
Eric Cassan	Far-left	Lutte Ouvrière	456	0.89		
Danièle Lessaint	Sovereigntist right	Independent	6	0.01		
Stéphane Gaultier	Far-left	Independent	0	0.00		
Total			51,453	100.00	47,623	100.00
Valid votes			51,453	97.65	47,623	91.61
Invalid votes			370	0.70	790	1.52
Blank votes			866	1.64	3,573	6.87
Total votes			52,689	100.00	51,986	100.00
Registered voters/turnout			78,781	66.88	78,796	65.98

=== 3rd constituency ===
Candidate	Party or alliance		First round		Second round	
Candidate	Party or alliance		Votes	%	Votes	%
Emmanuel Maurel	New Popular Front	Republican and Socialist Left	22,742	35.63	36,489	62.54
Nadejda Remy	National Rally		17,608	27.59	21,860	37.46
Cécile Rilhac	Ensemble	Renaissance	15,013	23.52		
Laetitia Vincent	The Republicans		4,816	7.55		
Samira Herbal	Ecologists	Independent	1,290	2.02		
Laetitia Guébin	Independent		1,046	1.64		
Alexandre Simonnot	Reconquête		837	1.31		
Juan Munoz	Far-left	Lutte Ouvrière	468	0.73		
Daniel Blaser	Far-left	Independent	7	0.01		
Samira Belmokhtar	Miscellaneous left	Independent	0	0.00		
Total			63,827	100.00	58,349	100.00
Valid votes			63,827	98.00	58,349	91.33
Invalid votes			374	0.57	997	1.56
Blank votes			930	1.43	4,539	7.10
Total votes			65,131	100.00	63,885	100.00
Registered voters/turnout			96,306	67.63	96,317	66.33

=== 4th constituency ===
Candidate	Party or alliance		First round		Second round	
Candidate	Party or alliance		Votes	%	Votes	%
Karine Lacouture	New Popular Front	La France Insoumise	17,498	34.65	20,008	44.61
Cécile Rilhac	Ensemble	Renaissance	14,084	27.89	24,840	55.39
Sébastien Meurant	Union of the far right	The Republicans	13,238	26.22		
Inthone Rodsphon	The Republicans		3,003	5.95		
Grégory Berthault	Ecologists	Independent	2,132	4.22		
Marie-Françoise L'hommedet	Far-left	Lutte Ouvrière	485	0.96		
Robin Durand	Independent		52	0.10		
Antonin Martin	Far-left	Independent	0	0.00		
Total			50,492	100.00	44,848	100.00
Valid votes			50,492	98.08	44,848	92.45
Invalid votes			262	0.51	880	1.81
Blank votes			728	1.41	2,780	5.73
Total votes			51,482	100.00	48,508	100.00
Registered voters/turnout			76,262	67.51	76,259	63.61

=== 5th constituency ===
Candidate	Party or alliance		Votes	%
Paul Vannier	New Popular Front	La France Insoumise	23,308	56.01
Quentin Hoarau	National Rally		7,784	18.70
Fatima Liliyaje	Ensemble	Renaissance	5,389	12.95
Boualem Meziane	The Republicans		3,170	7.62
Dominique Mariette	Far-left	Lutte Ouvrière	558	1.34
Dominique Lesueur	Ecologists	Independent	555	1.33
Gilbert Pham	Union of Democrats and Independents (Note: Dissident who ran without the support of Ensemble)		412	0.99
Thès Baleur	Independent	Miscellaneous right	251	0.60
Jean-Baptiste Poiaghi	Far-left	New Anticapitalist Party (Note: Dissident who ran without the support of the New Popular Front)	189	0.45
Total			41,616	100.00
Valid votes			41,616	97.75
Invalid votes			329	0.77
Blank votes			631	1.48
Total votes			42,576	100.00
Registered voters/turnout			70,843	60.10

=== 6th constituency ===
Candidate	Party or alliance		First round		Second round	
Candidate	Party or alliance		Votes	%	Votes	%
Gabrielle Cathala	New Popular Front	La France Insoumise	18,603	37.63	21,326	43.64
Estelle Folest	Ensemble	Democratic Movement	12,745	25.78	16,149	33.05
Annika Bruna	National Rally		10,911	22.07	11,389	23.31
Inthone Rodsphon	The Republicans		3,737	7.56		
Loïc Eléloué-Valmar	Regionalists	Ecologists	1,049	2.12		
Emmanuel Mikael	Miscellaneous centre	Independent	910	1.84		
Jean-Bernard Lasmarrigues	Reconquête		683	1.38		
Christophe Celestin	Miscellaneous centre	Independent	427	0.86		
Agnès Reinmann	Far-left	Lutte Ouvrière	370	0.75		
Marine Dageville	Far-left	New Anticapitalist Party (Note: Dissident who ran without the support of the New Popular Front)	0	0.00		
Total			49,435	100.00	48,864	100.00
Valid votes			49,435	98.24	48,864	98.07
Invalid votes			260	0.52	223	0.45
Blank votes			626	1.24	738	1.48
Total votes			50,321	100.00	49,825	100.00
Registered voters/turnout			75,753	66.43	75,779	65.75

=== 7th constituency ===
Candidate	Party or alliance		First round		Second round	
Candidate	Party or alliance		Votes	%	Votes	%
Gabrielle Cathala	New Popular Front	Socialist Party	16,797	37.94	24,713	60.57
David Quentin	National Rally		12,065	27.25	16,088	39.43
Dominique Da Silva	Ensemble	Renaissance	10,241	23.13		
Jean-Pierre Yalcin	The Republicans		3,891	8.79		
Virginie Vieville	Reconquête		696	1.57		
Valérie Suarez	Far-left	Lutte Ouvrière	578	1.31		
Marie-Christine Chastaing	Sovereigntist right	Independent	3	0.01		
Didier Arnal	Independent	Miscellaneous left	0	0.00		
Aurélien Gavois	Far-left	New Anticapitalist Party (Note: Dissident who ran without the support of the New Popular Front)	0	0.00		
Linda Uzan	Independent	Miscellaneous right	0	0.00		
Total			44,271	100.00	40,801	100.00
Valid votes			44,271	97.78	40,801	92.57
Invalid votes			294	0.65	603	1.37
Blank votes			712	1.57	2,674	6.07
Total votes			45,277	100.00	44,078	100.00
Registered voters/turnout			68,539	66.06	68,578	64.27

=== 8th constituency ===
Candidate	Party or alliance		Votes	%
Carlos Martens Bilongo	New Popular Front	La France Insoumise	17,386	58.27
David Quentin	National Rally		5,840	19.57
Ramzi Zinaoui	Ensemble	Union of Democrats and Independents	3,293	11.04
Patrick Angrevier	Miscellaneous right	Independent	1,961	6.57
Luisa Varela	Reconquête		503	1.69
Malika Kherfi	Miscellaneous centre	Independent	451	1.51
Rémi Gajdos	Far-left	Lutte Ouvrière	404	1.35
Jean-Baptiste Tondu	Far-left	New Anticapitalist Party (Note: Dissident who ran without the support of the New Popular Front)	0	0.00
Total			29,838	100.00
Valid votes			29,838	95.66
Invalid votes			762	2.44
Blank votes			593	1.90
Total votes			31,193	100.00
Registered voters/turnout			55,766	55.94

=== 9th constituency ===
Candidate	Party or alliance		First round		Second round	
Candidate	Party or alliance		Votes	%	Votes	%
Arnaud Le Gall	New Popular Front	La France Insoumise	17,157	40.73	23,918	60.27
Agnès Marion	National Rally		12,872	30.56	15,764	39.73
Elisa Demir	Ensemble	Renaissance	6,149	14.60		
Anthony Arciero	The Republicans		4,789	11.37		
Danièle Hanryon	Far-left	Lutte Ouvrière	621	1.47		
David Said	Reconquête		381	0.90		
Nsimba Wassa	Independent		157	0.37		
Mohamed Najib	Independent	Miscellaneous left	0	0.00		
Vanessa Ronchini	Far-left	New Anticapitalist Party (Note: Dissident who ran without the support of the New Popular Front)	0	0.00		
Total			42,126	100.00	39,682	100.00
Valid votes			42,126	97.59	39,682	92.32
Invalid votes			331	0.77	740	1.72
Blank votes			711	1.65	2,560	5.96
Total votes			43,168	100.00	42,982	100.00
Registered voters/turnout			71,614	60.28	71,644	59.99

=== 10th constituency ===
Candidate	Party or alliance		First round		Second round	
Candidate	Party or alliance		Votes	%	Votes	%
Aurélien Taché	New Popular Front	La France Insoumise	18,306	43.13	26,852	69.62
Lisbeth Macé	National Rally		9,667	22.78	11,716	30.38
Sonia Krimi	Ensemble	Renaissance	8,129	19.15		
Edwina Etoré-Manika	The Republicans		4,249	10.01		
Albert Saint-Jean	Union of Democrats and Independents (Note: Dissident who ran without the support of Ensemble)		1,107	2.61		
Christophe Flaux	Far-left	Lutte Ouvrière	489	1.15		
Souade de la Faye	Sovereigntist right	Independent	488	1.15		
Jean Caillot	Far-left	Independent	7	0.02		
Total			42,442	100.00	38,568	100.00
Valid votes			42,442	97.38	38,568	90.22
Invalid votes			237	0.54	599	1.40
Blank votes			906	2.08	3,583	8.38
Total votes			43,585	100.00	42,750	100.00
Registered voters/turnout			66,773	65.27	66,806	63.99
