= Bunel =

Bunel is a surname. Notable people with this surname include:

- François Bunel the Younger (fl. 1550), French painter
- Hugh Bunel (fl. 1077–1099), Norman warrior
- Jacob Bunel (1558–1614), French painter
- Joseph Bunel (fl. 1790s), a representative of the Haitian government
- Lucien Bunel, later known as Père Jacques (1900–1945), French priest and friar
- Marie Bunel (born 1961), French actress
- Marion Bunel (born 2004), French cyclist
- Paul Bunel (1882–1918), Norman photographer
- Pierre-Henri Bunel (born 1952), French intelligence officer and writer

== See also ==
- Buñuel (disambiguation)
