= Alain Richard =

French politician (born 1945)

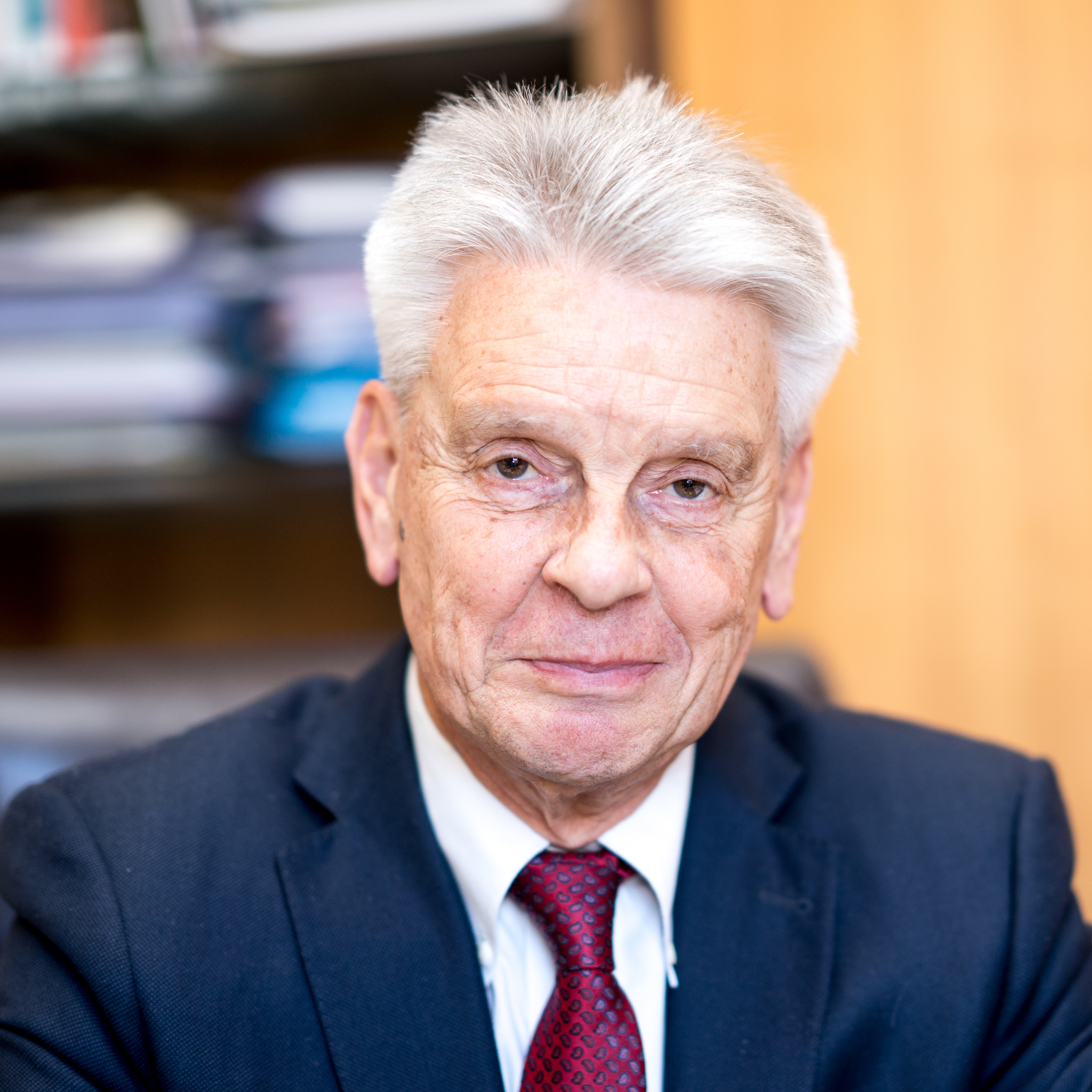
- Richard in 2018

Minister of Defence
- In office 3 June 1997 – 7 May 2002
- Prime Minister: Lionel Jospin
- Preceded by: Charles Millon
- Succeeded by: Michèle Alliot-Marie

Senator for Val-d'Oise
- In office 1 October 2011 – 2 October 2023
- In office 2 October 1995 – 4 July 1997

Member of the National Assembly for Val-d'Oise
- In office 3 April 1978 – 1 April 1993
- Preceded by: Michel Poniatowski
- Succeeded by: Christian Gourmelen
- Constituency: 1st (1978–1986); At-large (1986–1988); 2nd (1988–1997)

Mayor of Saint-Ouen-l'Aumône
- In office 19 December 2002 – 19 October 2017
- Preceded by: Andrée Salgues
- Succeeded by: Laurent Linquette
- In office 20 March 1977 – 4 July 1997
- Preceded by: Armand Lecomte
- Succeeded by: Jean-Louis Linquette

Personal details
- Born: Alain Louis Jacques Richard; 29 August 1945 (age 80) Paris, France
- Party: Unified Socialist Party (1962–1974); Socialist Party (1974–2017); Renaissance (2017–present)
- Education: Lycée Henri-IV
- Alma mater: Sciences Po; École nationale d'administration

Alain Louis Jacques Richard (French: [alɛ̃ ʁiʃaʁ]; born 29 August 1945) is a French politician who served as Minister of Defence from 1997 to 2002. A former member of the Socialist Party (PS), he joined La République En Marche! (LREM, later renamed Renaissance, RE) in 2017.

A member of the National Assembly for Val-d'Oise from 1978 to 1993, Richard was elected to the Senate in 1995 before he was appointed as Minister of Defence in the government of Prime Minister Lionel Jospin. He returned to the Senate in 2011, holding a seat until 2023.

== Early life and education ==
Richard received his Baccalauréat at the Lycée Henri-IV. He is an alumnus of Sciences Po and the École nationale d'administration (ÉNA).

== Political career ==
=== Early career ===
Richard was first elected as Mayor of Saint-Ouen-l'Aumône in 1977. In 1981, he was selected to be one of the first young leaders of the French-American Foundation.

A member of the Socialist Party (PS), Richard was elected to the National Assembly in the 1978 election. During his time in Parliament, he focused on the national budget.

=== Minister of Defence, 1997–2002 ===
Elected to the Senate in the 1995 election, Richard was appointed Minister of Defence in the government of Prime Minister Lionel Jospin two years later by President Jacques Chirac. During his time in office, he was in charge of implementing a plan that Chirac set in motion in 1996 to reduce the French Armed Forces' establishment across Africa to 350,000 uniformed personnel, from 500,000, by 2002. Notably, he closed a key military base in the north of the Central African Republic and reduced forces at a second, in Bangui, in 1997. Also under his leadership, the government completed the destruction of its stock of land mines in accordance with the 1997 Ottawa Convention.

Richard also oversaw the transition resulting from France's 1996 decision to suspend peacetime military conscription and move to an all-volunteer professional army; President Chirac formally announced the end of compulsory military service in 2001.

Dismissing doubts about France's support for NATO in Kosovo after French officer Pierre-Henri Bunel was charged with passing bombing plans to Serbia, Richard and Foreign Minister Hubert Védrine offered in 1998 to lead the NATO-led Kosovo Force (KFOR).

In January 2001, Richard made a submission about the Mitterrand–Pasqua affair – a controversial arms-trafficking case against Jean-Christophe Mitterrand, son of François Mitterrand – several weeks after magistrates had started criminal proceedings about the deal handled by Pierre Falcone's Paris-based company, Brenco International.

Seen as an ally of Jospin, Richard left office when Jean-Pierre Raffarin became Prime Minister following the 2002 election.

=== Return to the Senate, 2011–2023 ===
Richard went back to his initial position as Mayor of Saint-Ouen-l'Aumône, before regaining a seat in the Senate in the 2011 election. In the Socialist Party's 2011 primaries, he endorsed Martine Aubry as the party's candidate for the 2012 presidential election.

In the Senate, Richard held one of its vice presidencies from 2022 to 2023, under the leadership of its president Gérard Larcher. He was a member of the Committee on Legal Affairs. In addition to his committee assignments, Richard chaired the Senate's Taiwan friendship group. In this capacity, he visited Taiwan in 2015, 2018, 2021, and 2023, including meetings with President Tsai Ing-wen.

Richard was reelected to a second full term in the Senate in 2017, this time as a member of the liberal La République En Marche! (LREM), the party founded by Emmanuel Macron in 2016. He ran again for reelection in 2023 but was defeated by two votes. As of his departure from the Senate, he remains a municipal councillor of Saint-Ouen-l'Aumône.

== Honours ==
- Knight of the Legion of Honour (2023)
- Republic of China: Order of Propitious Clouds with Special Grand Cordon (2021)

Political offices
Preceded by Charles Millon	Minister of Defence; 1997–2002	Succeeded by Michèle Alliot-Marie
