= Michel Bourgeois =

French politician (1940–2022)

Member of the National Assembly for Doubs's 2nd constituency
- In office 28 April 2001 – 18 June 2002
- Preceded by: Paulette Guinchard-Kunstler
- Succeeded by: Paulette Guinchard-Kunstler

Personal details
- Born: 2 April 1940; Besançon, France
- Died: 16 November 2022 (aged 82); Besançon, France
- Political party: Socialist Party

Michel Bourgeois (2 April 1940 – 16 November 2022) was a French politician of the Socialist Party. He represented Doubs's 2nd constituency in the National Assembly from 2001 to 2002.

Bourgeois died on 16 November 2022, at the age of 82.
