= Pernot =

Pernot (English: /pərˈnoʊ/, French: [pɛʁno]) is a French surname. Notable people with the surname include:

- Barne Pernot (born 1999), German footballer
- Georges Pernot (1879–1962), French lawyer and politician
- Hubert Pernot (1870–1946), French linguist, specializing in Modern Greek studies
- Jean-Pierre Pernot (born 1947), French politician

== See also ==
- Jean-Pierre Pernaut (born 1950), French news reader
