= Catholic League (French) =

Faction of the French Wars of Religion (1576–1595)

- Ligue catholique
- Flag of the League, ca. 1590
- Dates active: 1576–1577; 1584–1595
- Allegiance: Crown of France (de jure); Crown of Spain (de facto)
- Headquarters: Paris and Péronne
- Ideology: Anti-Protestantism; Counter-Reformation; Defense of the Catholic Church in France; Opposition to the Reformed Church of France
- Size: Unknown
- Wars: French Wars of Religion

The Catholic League of France (French: Ligue catholique), sometimes referred to by contemporary (and modern) Catholics as the Holy League (La Sainte Ligue), was a major participant in the French Wars of Religion. The League, founded and led by Henri I, Duke of Guise, intended the eradication of Protestantism from Catholic France, as well as the replacement of the French King Henry III, who had acquiesced to Protestant worship in the Edict of Beaulieu (1576). The League also fought against Henry of Navarre, the Protestant prince who became presumptive heir to the French throne in 1584.

Pope Sixtus V, Philip II of Spain, and the Jesuits were all supporters of this Catholic party.

== Origins ==
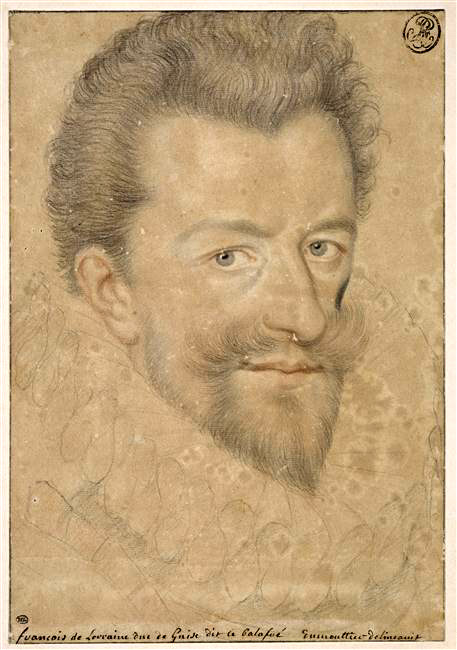
Henry, Duke of Guise, founder and leader of the Catholic League

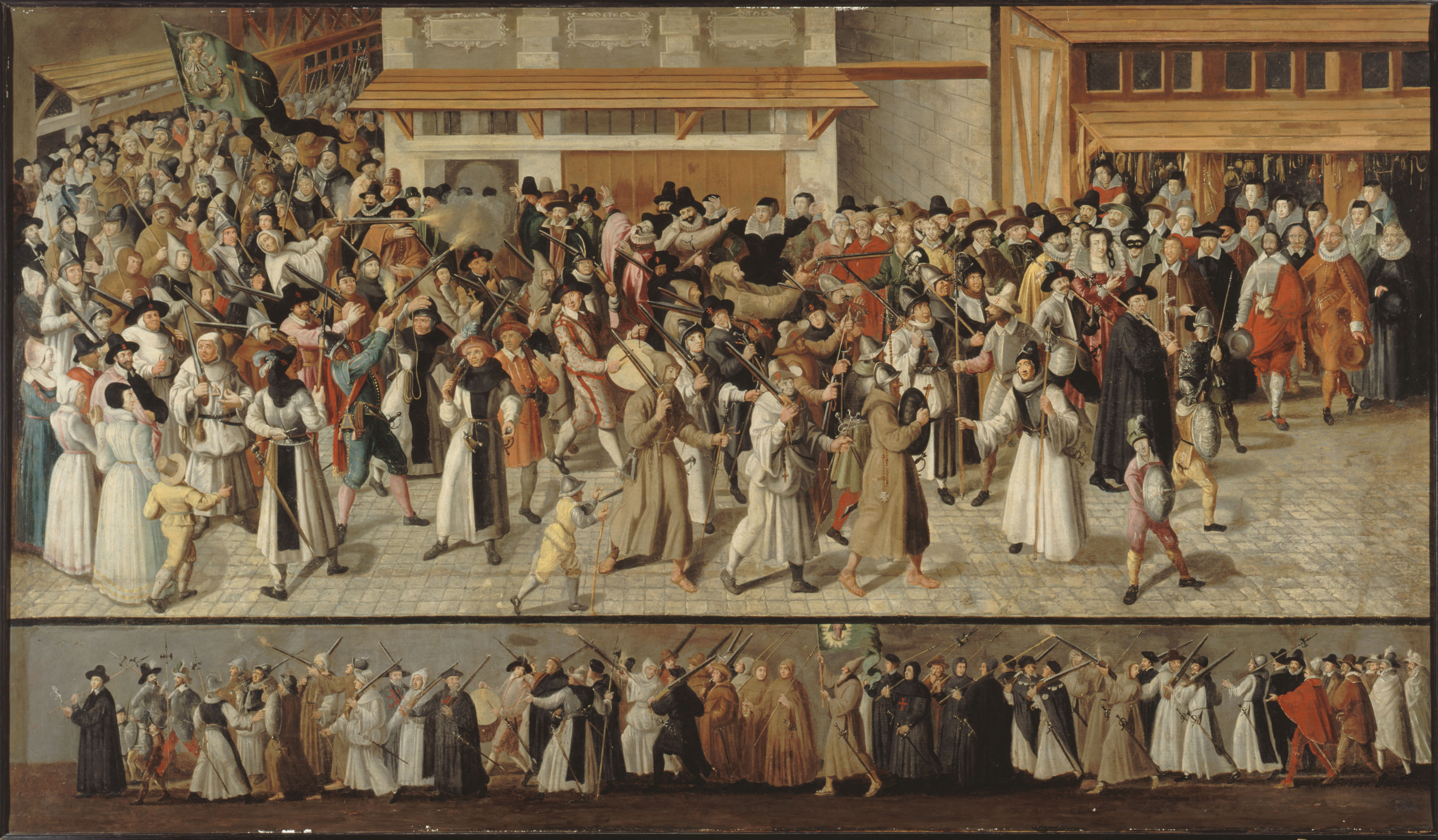
Procession de la Ligue dans l'Ile de la Cité by François II Bunel (1522–1599). Musée Carnavalet.

Local confraternities were initially established by French Catholics to counter the Edict of Beaulieu in 1576. King Henry III placed himself at the head of these associations as a counter-balance to the ultra-Catholic League of Peronne. Following the repudiation of that edict by the Estates General, most of the local leagues were disbanded.

In June 1584, the illness and death of Henry III's heir François, Duke of Anjou made the Protestant Henry of Navarre the new heir presumptive under Salic law. Faced with the prospect of a Protestant king, Catholic nobles gathered at Nancy in December 1584, and the League drew up a treaty with Philip II's ambassadors at Joinville. Following this agreement, the Catholic confraternities and leagues were united as the Catholic League under the leadership of Henry I, Duke of Guise.

The Catholic League aimed to preempt any seizure of power by the Huguenots, who made up nearly half of the French nobility, and to protect French Catholics' right to worship. The Catholic League's cause was fueled by the doctrine Extra Ecclesiam nulla salus. It feared that the House of Valois would weaken the Catholic position by attempting to appease the Huguenots.

The League was also inspired by the writings of the English Catholic refugee Richard Verstegan, who published accounts of the suffering of English, Welsh, and Irish Catholic Martyrs under the Protestant monarchy of England. In 1588, Verstegan was briefly imprisoned by Henri III at the insistence of the English ambassador Sir Francis Walsingham, but soon released at the insistence of the Catholic League and the Papal Nuncio.

By this time "the League in Paris had fallen from its first ideals into mere partisanship", and the Duke of Guise increasingly used it not only to defend the Catholic cause, but as a political tool in an attempt to usurp the French throne.

Catholic Leaguers saw their fight against Calvinism (the primary branch of Protestantism in France) as a Crusade against heresy and to defend French Catholics from Elizabethan-style persecution. The League's pamphleteers blamed any natural disaster as God's way of punishing France for tolerating heretics.

Both the League and the hardline Calvinists scorned Henry III's attempts to mediate peaceful coexistence between Catholics and Protestants. The League also opposed the pragmatic French jurists and intellectuals known as Politiques, who recoiled from the murderous sectarian loathing and sought a strong monarchy to rise above religious differences.

== History ==
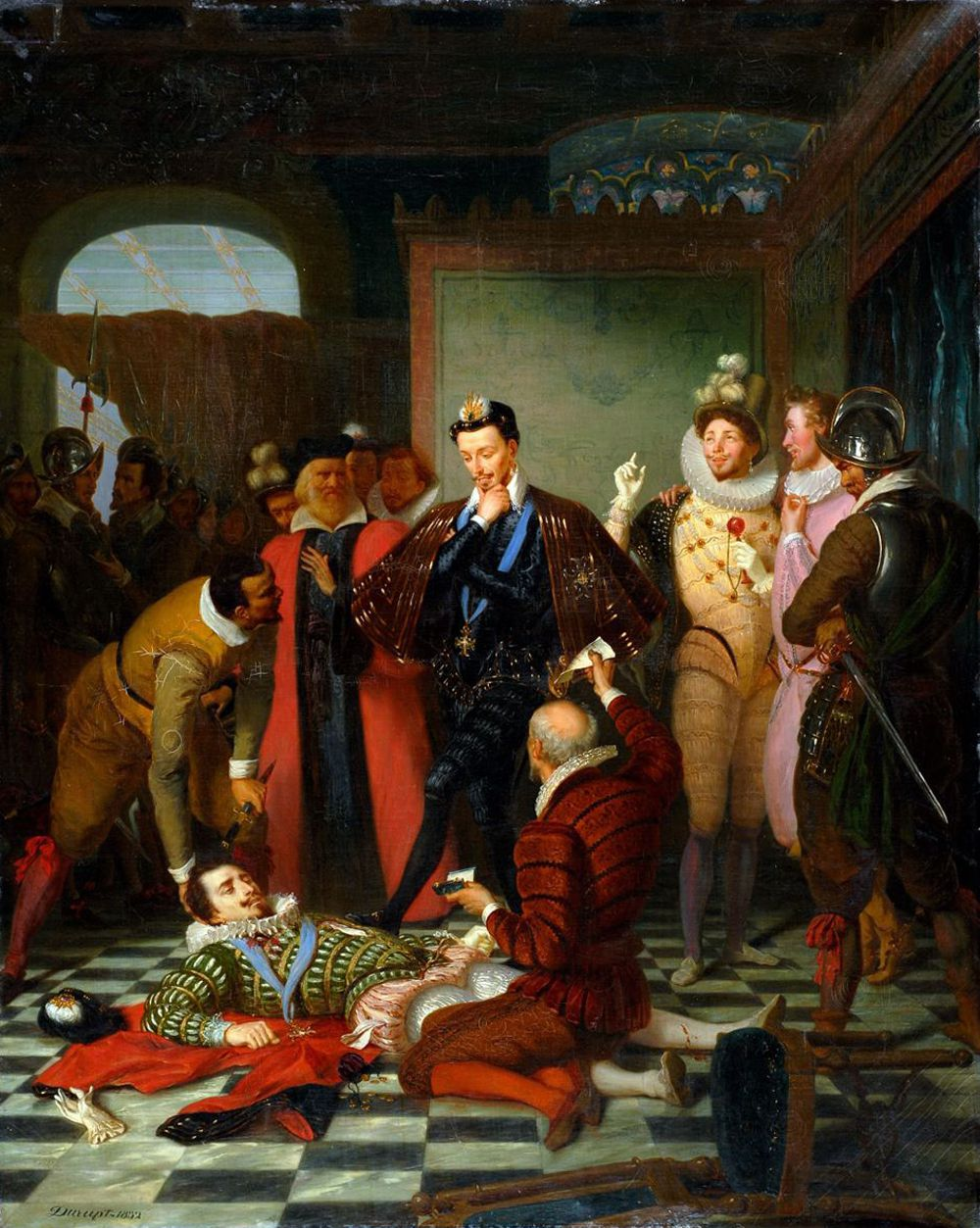
Assassination of the Duke of Guise, leader of the Catholic League, by King Henry III, in 1588.

The League immediately began to exert pressure on King Henry III and his heir Henry of Navarre. Faced with this mounting opposition, the King canceled the Peace of La Rochelle, re-criminalizing Protestantism and beginning a new chapter in the French Wars of Religion. However, Henry III also feared the growing power of the Duke of Guise, the head of the Catholic League. On the Day of the Barricades, Henry III was forced to flee Paris, leaving Guise as de facto ruler of France. To recover the King's position, on 23 December 1588 royal guardsmen assassinated the Duke and his brother Louis II, while the Duke's son Charles of Lorraine was imprisoned in the Bastille.

This move did little to consolidate the King's power and enraged both the surviving Guises and their followers. The King again fled Paris to join Henry of Navarre, and began building an army to besiege the capital.

On 1 August 1589, as the two Henrys sat before the city preparing for their final assault, Jacques Clément, a Dominican lay brother with ties to the League and enraged by the killing of the Duke, infiltrated the King's entourage dressed as a priest, and assassinated him. As he lay dying, the King begged Henry of Navarre to convert to Catholicism, calling it the only way to prevent further bloodshed. The King's death threw the army into disarray and Henry of Navarre was forced to lift the siege.

Although Henry of Navarre was now the legitimate King of France, the League's armies forced him to retreat south. Using arms and military advisors provided by Queen Elizabeth I of England, he achieved several military victories. However, he was unable to overcome the superior forces of the League, which commanded the loyalty of most Frenchmen and had the support of Philip II of Spain. On 21 November 1589 the League attempted to declare the Cardinal of Bourbon, Henry's uncle, as king Charles X of France. However, the Cardinal was under guard by Henry's men, and he refused to usurp the throne from his nephew; he died in May 1590.

The Catholic jurist and poet Jean de La Ceppède, a Politique supporter of Henry of Navarre, was arrested in 1589 when Aix-en-Provence fell to the League's armies. After a failed attempt to escape disguised as a shoemaker, he was released on the orders of an admirer who was a senior member of the League.

In the estates general of 1593, the League was unable even to unite behind a single candidate for the French throne, splitting between several candidates including the Spanish princess Isabella. The League's position was further weakened, but they still securely held Paris. The stalemate was finally ended when Henry of Navarre was received into the Catholic Church on 25 July 1593, and was welcomed into Paris as King Henry IV on 27 February 1594.

The Catholic League, now lacking the threat of a Calvinist king, continued to disintegrate. The last remaining senior leader of the League was Philippe Emmanuel, Duke of Mercœur, who, with Spanish backing, was also fighting to restore the political independence of the Duchy of Brittany under his own rule.

With reinforcements sent from England, King Henry at last marched against the Duke of Mercœur in person, but instead received his submission, as the last remaining military leader of the Catholic League, at Angers on 20 March 1598. King Henry IV then assured his dynasty's future inheritance of Brittany by arranging the marriage of his illegitimate son, César Duc de Vendôme, to Mercœur's daughter Francoise. In April 1598, the King issued the Edict of Nantes, granting religious toleration and limited autonomy to the Huguenots, while retaining the Catholic Church in France as the Established Church of the realm, and finally ended the civil war.

== Assessment ==
Historian Mack Holt argues that historians have sometimes overemphasised the political role of the League at the expense of its religious and devotional character:

What is the final judgement on the Catholic League? It would be a mistake to treat it, as so many historians have, as nothing more than a body motivated purely by partisan politics or social tensions. While political and social pressures were doubtless present, and even significant in the case of the Sixteen in Paris, to focus on these factors exclusively overlooks a very different face of the League. For all its political and internecine wrangling, the League was still very much a Holy Union. Its religious role was significant, as the League was the conduit between the Tridentine spirituality of the Catholic Reformation and the seventeenth century devots. Often overlooked is the emphasis the League placed on the internal and spiritual renewal of the earthly city. Moving beyond the communal religion of the later Middle Ages, the League focused on internalizing faith as a cleansing and purifying agent. New religious orders and confraternities were founded in League towns, and the gulf separating laity and clergy was often bridged as clerics joined aldermen in the Hotel de Ville where both became the epitome of goodly magistrates. To overlook the religious side of the League is to overlook the one bond that did keep the Holy Union holy as well as united.

== Sources ==
- Baumgartner, Frederic J. (1976). Radical Reactionaries: The Political Thought of the French Catholic League. Librairie Droz.
- Carroll, Warren H. (2004). The Cleaving of Christendom:A History of Christendom. Vol. 4. Christendom Press.
- Desan, Philippe (2019). Montaigne: A Life. Princeton University Press.
- Holt, Mack P. (1995). The French Wars of Religion, 1562–1629. Cambridge University Press.
- Knecht, Robert Jean (1989). The French Wars of Religion, 1559–1598. Longman.
- Lamal, Nina (2016). "Promoting the Catholic Cause on the Italian Peninsula: Printed Avvisi on the Dutch Revolt and the French Wars of Religion, 1562–1600". In Raymond, Joad; Moxham, Noah (eds.). News Networks in Early Modern Europe. Brill. pp. 675–694.
- Leonardo, Dalia M. (2002). ""Cut off this rotten member": The Rhetoric of Heresy, Sin, and Disease in the Ideology of the French Catholic League". The Catholic Historical Review. 88.2, (April) (2): 247–262. doi:10.1353/cat.2002.0087. S2CID 159741600.
- Scoville, Warren Candler (1960). The Persecution of Huguenots and French Economic Development, 1680–1720. Yale University Press.
- Carroll, Stuart (1998). Noble Power during the French Wars of Religion. Cambridge University Press.
- Penzi, Marco (January 2014). "From Frenchman to Crusader: the political and military itinerary of Philippe Emmanuel Duke of Mercoeur". Academia.edu.
