= Nathalie Élimas =

French politician (born 1973)

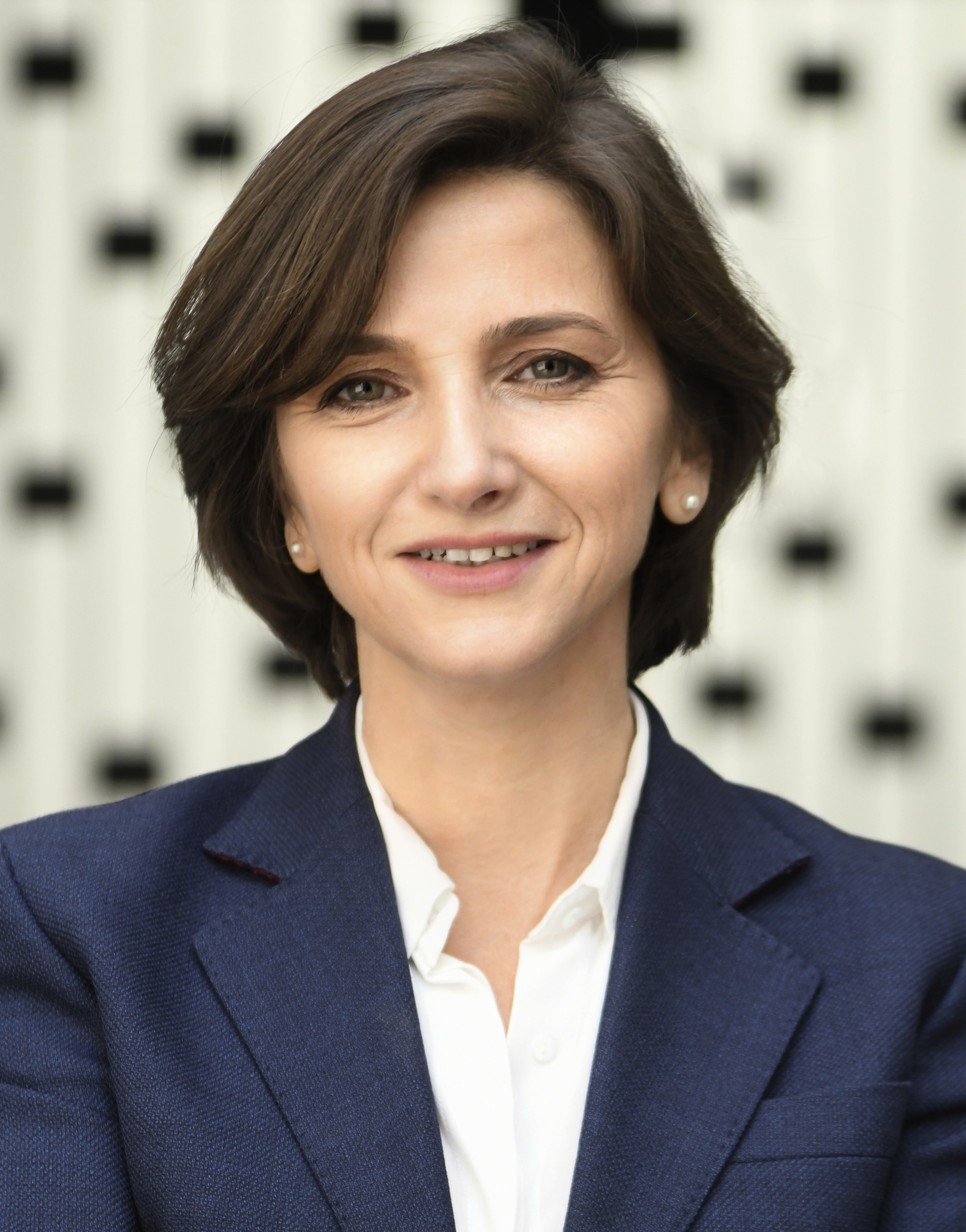
- Nathalie Élimas in 2019

Secretary of State for Priority Education
- In office 26 July 2020 – 5 March 2022
- President: Emmanuel Macron
- Prime Minister: Jean Castex

Member of the National Assembly for Val-d'Oise's 6th constituency
- In office 21 June 2017 – 26 August 2020
- Preceded by: François Scellier
- Succeeded by: David Corceiro

Personal details
- Born: 5 June 1973 (age 53) Beauvais, France
- Party: MoDem
- Spouse: Yann Élimas
- Children: 4
- Education: Paris Nanterre University

Nathalie Élimas (born 5 June 1973) is a French politician of the Democratic Movement (MoDem) who served as State Secretary for Priority Education at the Ministry of National Education in the government of Prime Minister Jean Castex from 2020 to 2022. She was previously a member of the National Assembly from 2017 until 2020, representing Val-d'Oise's 6th constituency.

== Political career ==
Élimas first became involved in politics during the 2007 French presidential election, during which she supported MoDem candidate François Bayrou.

In the 2015 French regional elections, Élimas was elected to the Regional Council of Île-de-France, as part of the electoral list led by Valérie Pécresse.

In parliament, Élimas served on the Committee on Social Affairs from 2017 until 2020.

On 26 July 2020 Élimas was appointed Secretary of State for Priority Education to the Minister of National Education, Youth and Sports Jean-Michel Blanquer. She left the government on 5 March 2022 following an administrative enquiry, after being accused of moral harassment by employees in her cabinet. She returned to Parliament.

She stood in the 2022 French legislative election as a miscellaneous centre candidate but lost her seat in the first round.

== Political positions ==
In July 2019, Élimas voted in favor of the French ratification of the European Union’s Comprehensive Economic and Trade Agreement (CETA) with Canada.

== Legal proceedings ==
On 10 March 2022, following an administrative inquiry opened in January, the General Inspectorate of Education, Sport and Research referred the case to the judiciary. Former ministerial staff members of Nathalie Élimas made accusations of workplace harassment.

On 17 March, the Paris public prosecutor opened a preliminary inquiry to verify the allegations of moral harassment that the former Secretary of State allegedly inflicted upon her subordinates. The police investigation was entrusted to the Brigade for the Repression of Delinquency Against Persons of the Paris Regional Judicial Police. In response, the former government member publicly announced that she had filed a complaint on 12 March for malicious denunciation. On 3 April 2025, the prosecution requested a ten-month suspended prison sentence, a 10,000 euro fine, and a three-year period of ineligibility for moral harassment against her staff.

On 16 June 2025, she was sentenced to a ten-month suspended prison sentence, a three-year ineligibility period, and a 5,000 euro fine for moral harassment. The court recognized a pattern of "harassing and abusive management" toward five of her former staff members—four women and one man—based on "unfounded reproaches," "contradictory injunctions," "humiliations," "denigration," "infantilization," and the spreading of "rumors."
