= Val-d'Oise's 2nd constituency =

French legislative constituency

2nd constituency of Val-d'Oise
- inline Constituency of the National Assembly of France

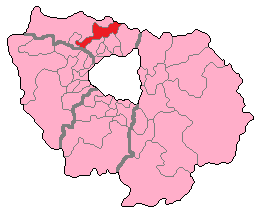
- Val-d'Oise's 2nd Constituency shown within Île-de-France
- Deputy: Guillaume Vuilletet; RE
- Department: Val-d'Oise
- Cantons: Cergy-Sud - l'Hautil (part) - l'Isle-Adam - canton de Saint-Ouen-l'Aumône - Viarmes
- Registered voters: 76,534

The 2nd constituency of Val-d'Oise is a French legislative constituency in the Val-d'Oise département. It is currently represented by Guillaume Vuilletet of La République En Marche! (LREM).

== Description ==
The 2nd constituency of Val d'Oise runs as a thin strip of territory across the centre of the department from north to south and encompasses one canton from Cergy part of the Cergy-Pontoise new town.

Since 1988 the seat has swung between left and right in line with national trends, however at the 2012 elections it was held by the UMP thus defying this pattern.

In the 2010 redistricting of French legislative constituencies, the department of Val-d'Oise was granted an additional seat, the 10th constituency. This was created by taking two cantons from the 2nd constituency.

== Historic Representation ==
Election	Member	Party
1967	Jacques Richard	UDR
1968	Jacques Richard	UDR
1973	Claude Weber	PCF
1978	Jean-Pierre Delalande	RPR
1981	Jean-Pierre Le Coadic	PS
1986	Proportional representation – no election by constituency	
1988	Alain Richard	PS
1993	Christian Gourmelen	UDF
1997	Dominique Gillot	PS
1999	Jean-Pierre Pernot	PS
2002	Axel Poniatowski	UMP
2007	Axel Poniatowski	UMP
2012	Axel Poniatowski	UMP
2017	Guillaume Vuilletet	LREM
2022	Guillaume Vuilletet	RE

== Election results ==
=== 2024 ===
Candidate	Party	Alliance	First round			Second round		
Candidate	Party	Alliance	Votes	%	+/–	Votes	%	+/–
Ayda Hadizadeh	PS	NFP	17,221	33.47	+4.19	28,342	59.51	+12.76
Nadejda Remy	RN		15,544	30.21	+12.13	19,281	40.49	N/A
Guillaume Vuilletet	RE	ENS	13,044	25.35	-3.44	WITHDREW		
Frédéric Pain	LR		3,214	6.25	-2.43			
Brahim Oubairouk	DIV		818	1.59	-1.32			
Alvin Ivanaj	DIV		621	1.21	N/A			
Philippe Chanzy	REC		529	1.03	-4.25			
Éric Cassan	LO		456	0.89	+0.09			
Danièle Lessaint	DIV		6	0.01	N/A			
Stephane Gaultier	DIV		0	0.00	N/A			
Valid votes			51,453	97.65	-0.53	47,623	91.61	+1.02
Blank votes			866	1.64	+0.23	3,573	6.87	+1.62
Null votes			370	0.70	+0.30	790	1.52	-0.60
Turnout			52,689	66.88	+20.47	51,986	65.98	+20.69
Abstentions			26,092	33.12	-20.47	26,810	34.02	-20.69
Registered voters			78,781			78,796		
Source: Ministry of the Interior, Le Monde
Result						PS GAIN FROM RE		

=== 2022 ===
Legislative Election 2022: Val-d'Oise's 2nd constituency
Party	Candidate	Votes	%	±%
LREM (Ensemble)	Guillaume Vuilletet	10,252	28.79	-6.67
LFI (NUPÉS)	Sylvie Geoffroy-Martin	9,652	27.10	+2.72
RN	Nadejda Remy	6,439	18.08	+6.85
LR (UDC)	Frédéric Pain	3,092	8.68	−15.77
REC	Philippe Chanzy	1,882	5.28	N/A
DVE	Brahim Oubairouk	1,036	2.91	N/A
DVG	Mireille Dombrowski	775	2.18	N/A
Others	N/A	2,484		
Turnout		36,270	46.41	−1.95
2nd round result
LREM (Ensemble)	Guillaume Vuilletet	17,462	53.25	+2.29
LFI (NUPÉS)	Sylvie Geoffroy-Martin	15,333	46.75	N/A
Turnout		32,795	45.29	+4.16
LREM hold				

=== 2017 ===
Candidate	Label	First round		Second round	
Candidate	Label	Votes	%	Votes	%
Guillaume Vuilletet	REM	12,921	35.46	14,539	50.96
Axel Poniatowski	LR	8,909	24.45	13,992	49.04
Sylvie Geoffroy-Martin	FI	4,685	12.86		
Stéphane Capdet	FN	4,091	11.23		
Ayda Hadizadeh	PS	2,010	5.52		
Marc Denis	ECO	1,515	4.16		
Jean-Michel Ruiz	PCF	670	1.84		
Philippe Vinet	DLF	462	1.27		
Christophe Hayes	DIV	288	0.79		
Philippe Moulines	EXD	259	0.71		
Cecilia Carvajal Delgado	DIV	250	0.69		
Abdel-Basett Neftia	EXG	211	0.58		
Mokhtar Mamlouk	DVG	69	0.19		
Naima Abbassi	ECO	68	0.19		
Yavuz Ozdemir	DIV	35	0.10		
Votes		36,443	100.00	28,531	100.00
Valid votes		36,443	98.46	28,531	90.65
Blank votes		426	1.15	2,280	7.24
Null votes		144	0.39	663	2.11
Turnout		37,013	48.36	31,474	41.13
Abstentions		39,521	51.64	45,048	58.87
Registered voters		76,534		76,522	
Source: Ministry of the Interior

=== 2012 ===
Legislative Election 2012: Val-d'Oise's 2nd constituency
Party	Candidate	Votes	%	±%
UMP	Axel Poniatowski	15,947	37.97	
EELV	Guillaume Vuilletet	15,209	36.21	
FN	David Chevrier	5,474	13.03	
FG	Isabbelle Duchet	2,816	6.71	
DVG	Jean-Pierre Pernot	1,177	2.80	
Others	N/A	1,375		
Turnout		41,998	57.16	
2nd round result
UMP	Axel Poniatowski	20,863	50.86	
EELV	Guillaume Vuilletet	20,155	49.14	
Turnout		41,018	55.83	
UMP hold				

=== 2007 ===
Legislative Election 2007: Val-d'Oise's 2nd constituency
Party	Candidate	Votes	%	±%
UMP	Axel Poniatowski	30,018	45.42	
PS	Dominique Lefebvre	18,533	28.04	
MoDem	M Barek Marir	5,277	7.98	
LV	Rose-Marie Saint-Germes Akar	2,529	3.83	
FN	Jean-Pierre Emie	2,407	3.64	
PCF	Moussa Diarra	2,026	3.07	
Far left	Bruno Jacquin	1,962	2.97	
Others	N/A	3,341		
Turnout		67,128	58.41	
2nd round result
UMP	Axel Poniatowski	33,270	53.08	
PS	Dominique Lefebvre	29,408	46.92	
Turnout		64,396	56.03	
UMP hold				

=== 2002 ===
Legislative Election 2002: Val-d'Oise's 2nd constituency
Party	Candidate	Votes	%	±%
UMP	Axel Poniatowski	25,443	40.77	
PS	Dominique Gillot	20,664	33.11	
FN	Jean-Pierre Emie	7,105	11.38	
LV	Sylvain De Smet	1,771	2.84	
PCF	Laurent Dumond	1,590	2.55	
Others	N/A	5,840		
Turnout		64,303	65.01	
2nd round result
UMP	Axel Poniatowski	31,163	53.08	
PS	Dominique Gillot	27,546	46.92	
Turnout		60,330	60.99	
UMP gain from PS				

=== 1997 ===
Legislative Election 1997: Val-d'Oise's 2nd constituency
Party	Candidate	Votes	%	±%
UDF	Régis Humbert	16,109	26.83	
PS	Dominique Gillot	12,607	21.00	
FN	Jean-Pierre Emié	10,275	17.12	
DVG	Isabelle Massin	7,927	13.20	
PCF	Laurent Dumont	3,426	5.71	
LV	Marc Denis	1,894	3.15	
LO	Christian Brison	1,564	2.61	
DVD	Jean-Michel Bertrand	1,372	2.29	
Others	N/A	4,860		
Turnout		62,380	67.02	
2nd round result
PS	Dominique Gillot	32,362	51.84	
UDF	Régis Humbert	30,063	48.16	
Turnout		65,814	70.48	
PS gain from UDF				

== Sources ==
Official results of French elections from 2002: "Résultats électoraux officiels en France" (in French).
