= Jacques Grosperrin =

French politician

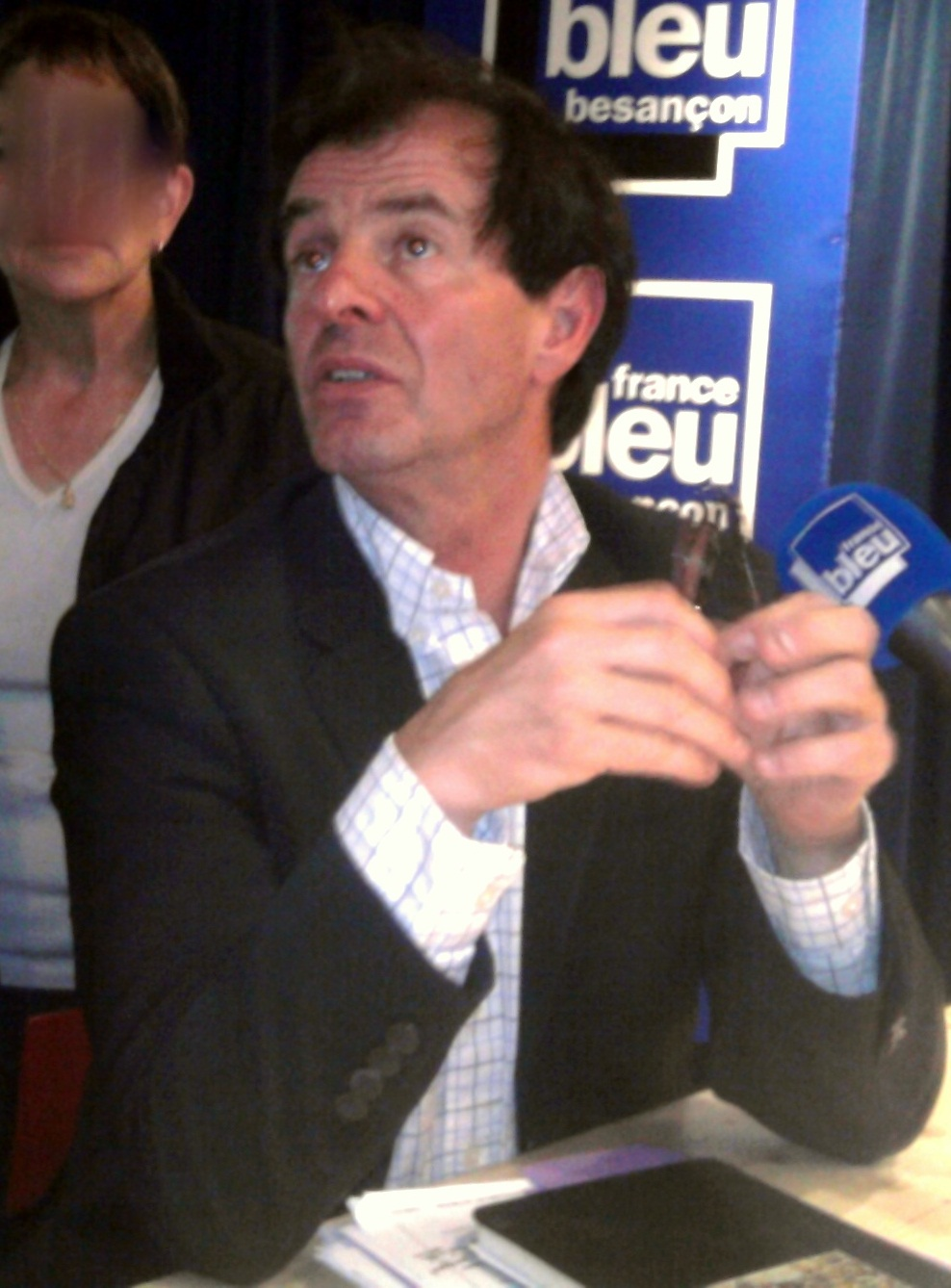
- Jacques Grosperrin in 2012

Member of the French Senate for Doubs
- Incumbent
- Assumed office 1 October 2014

Member of the National Assembly for Doubs's 2nd constituency
- In office 20 June 2007 – 20 June 2012
- Preceded by: Paulette Guinchard-Kunstler
- Succeeded by: Éric Alauzet

Personal details
- Born: 17 October 1955 (age 70) Baden-Baden, Germany
- Party: The Republicans
- Education: Lumière University Lyon 2

Jacques Grosperrin (born 17 October 1955) is a French politician of The Republicans who has been a member of the Senate since the 2014 elections, representing the Doubs department. Previously he served as a member of the National Assembly of France from 2007 until 2012.

== Political positions ==
In the Republicans’ 2016 presidential primaries, Grosperrin endorsed Jean-François Copé as the party's candidate for the office of President of France.

== Other activities ==
- École nationale d'administration (ENA), Member of the Board of Directors (since 2019)
