= Jean-Pierre Pernot =

French politician (1947–2025)

Member of the National Assembly for Val-d'Oise's 2nd constituency
- In office 29 August 1999 – 18 June 2002
- Preceded by: Dominique Gillot
- Succeeded by: Axel Poniatowski

Personal details
- Born: 25 June 1947 Clichy, France
- Died: 2 June 2025 (aged 77) Ennery, France
- Party: Socialist Party

Jean-Pierre Pernot (French: [ʒɑ̃pjɛʁ pɛʁno]; 25 June 1947 – 2 June 2025) was a French politician.

== Life and career ==
Pernot was born in Clichy-sous-Bois on 25 June 1947. He was first elected mayor of Méry-sur-Oise in 1995, while affiliated with the Socialist Party. Pernot later joined the Citizen and Republican Movement. The Constitutional Council froze Pernot's campaign accounts in a 2013 ruling, rendering him unable to run in the 2014 election. He served in the National Assembly as a Socialist Party member representing Val-d'Oise's 2nd constituency from 1999 to 2002, replacing Dominique Gillot, who accepted an appointment as health minister.

Pernot supported the 2017 campaign of presidential candidate Emmanuel Macron.

Pernot died at a rehabilitation centre in Ennery, Val-d'Oise, on 2 June 2025, at the age of 77. He had suffered a stroke in 2014, which left him much weakened in his later years.
