= Emma Fourreau =

French politician (born 1999)

Emma Fourreau MEP
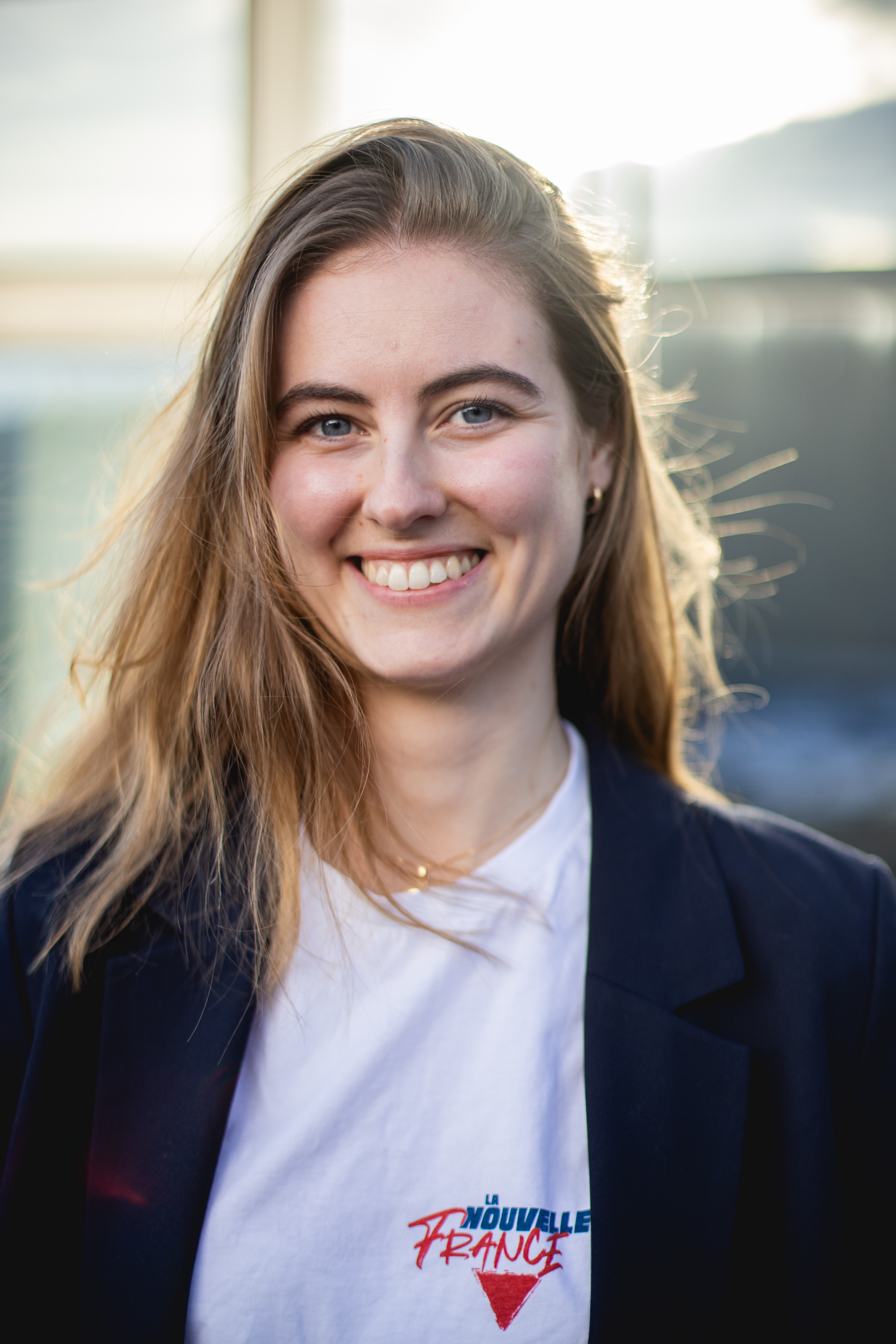
- Fourreau in 2025

Member of the European Parliament for France
- Incumbent
- Assumed office 16 July 2024
- Parliamentary group: The Left

Personal details
- Born: 1 October 1999 (age 27) Pontault-Combault, Île-de-France, France
- Party: La France Insoumise (since 2016)
- Education: Sciences Po Rennes

Emma Fourreau (French pronunciation: [ema fuʁo]; born 1 October 1999) is a French politician for La France Insoumise (LFI).

== Early life and education ==
Fourreau was born in 1999 in Pontault-Combault to a French father and a Swedish mother, both working as officials. She attended Lycée Malherbe in Caen, earning her Baccalauréat Littéraire with a mention très bien in 2017. She then studied at Sciences Po Rennes.

== Political career ==
Fourreau was elected as an Member of the European Parliament (MEP) in the 2024 European elections. She was elected from the France constituency on the ballot of La France Insoumise–PG–GES–REV–Péyi-A–PLR. Fourreau sits with The Left parliamentary group. She is the youngest person to have been elected a MEP for France.

As of 2025, she is part of the Committee on Fisheries, promoting measures against overfishing and a transition to eco-social fishing; of the Committee on the Environment, Public Health and Food Safety; of the Delegation for relations with the Mashreq countries; and of the Delegation to the Parliamentary Assembly of the Union for the Mediterranean.

== Activism and legal issues ==
Committed to the protection of marine ecosystems, Fourreau is the founder of Sang Océan, an organization opposing, among other things, the trade of shark fins. As a MEP, she called for the liberation of Canadian environmental activist Paul Watson of Sea Shepherd when he was detained in Denmark.

In July 2025, Fourreau, alongside fellow LFI member and French MP Gabrielle Cathala and other activists, was on board the Gaza Freedom Flotilla, seeking to break Israel's blockade of the Gaza Strip. Between 26 and 27 July, the IDF seized the ship, towed it to the Port of Ashdod, and detained the activists on board, vowing to deport them to their respective countries. Along with most of the detainees, she refused to sign deportation papers, and went on a hunger strike to protest Israel's illegal arrest of the crew and its starvation of Palestinians in Gaza; Cathala was expelled instead. On 29 July, Fourreau was transferred to the airport for deportation.

On 13 August 2025, Fourreau was briefly detained and interrogated by the judicial police of Caen for "apology of terrorism". She was questioned about the phrase "long live his fight" (que vive son combat), which she had used the previous month in a tweet celebrating the release of Lebanese pro-Palestinian militant Georges Ibrahim Abdallah (a convicted terrorist). Fourreau, receiving solidarity from other LFI members, denounced the incident as an act of "political repression", contrasting the authorities' response to her tweet with their inaction over "dozens of tweets which actually constitute apology of the genocide taking place in Gaza".
