= David Corceiro =

French politician (born 1977)

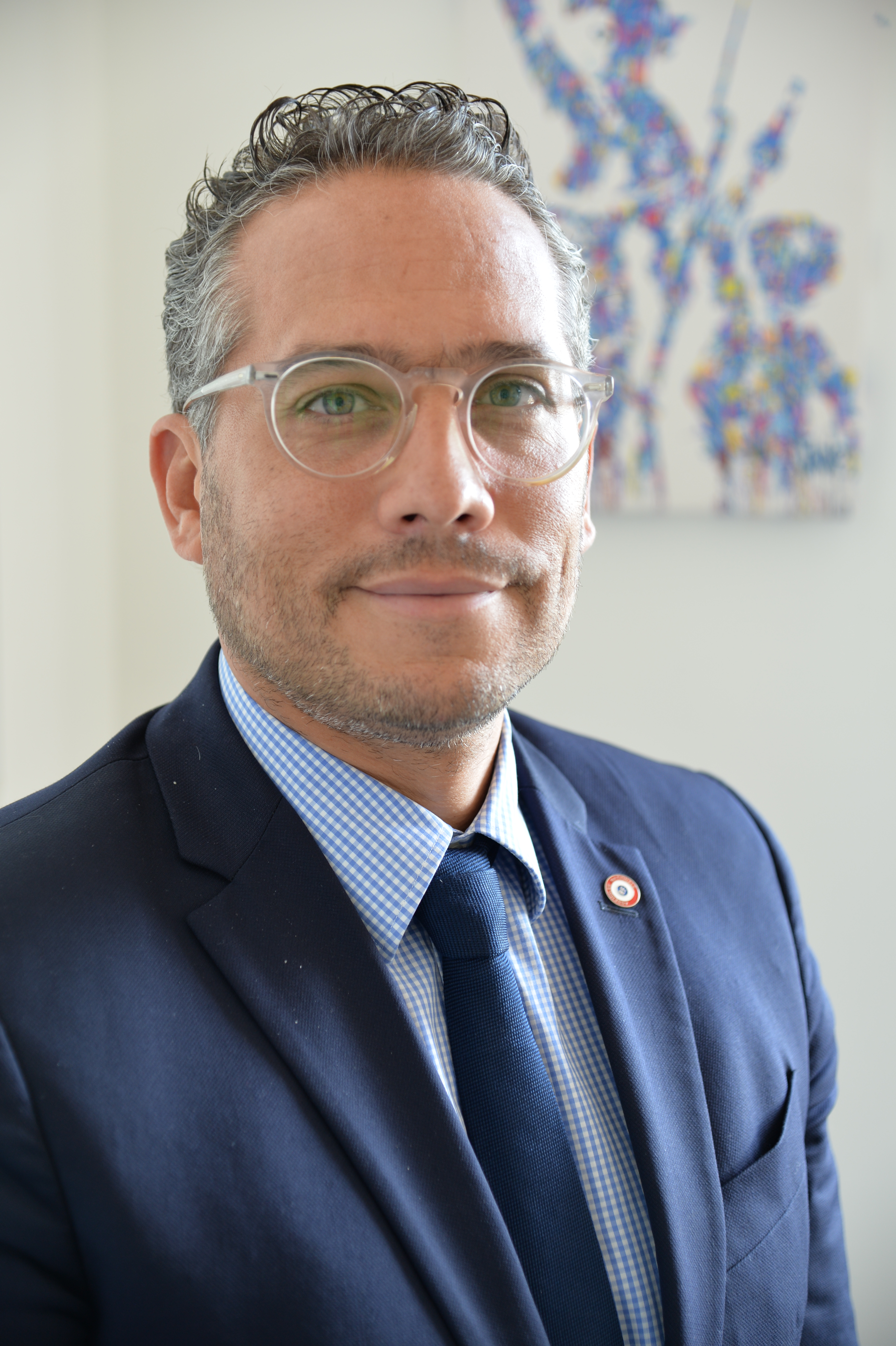

Member of the National Assembly for Val-d'Oise's 6th constituency
- In office 27 August 2020 – 2022
- Preceded by: Nathalie Élimas
- Succeeded by: Estelle Folest

Personal details
- Born: 3 August 1977 (age 48) Saint-Denis, Seine-Saint-Denis, France
- Party: MoDem

David Corceiro (born 3 August 1977) is a French politician who was Member of Parliament for Val-d'Oise's 6th constituency from 2020 to 2022.

== See also ==
- List of deputies of the 15th National Assembly of France
