= Éric Alauzet =

French politician (born 1958)

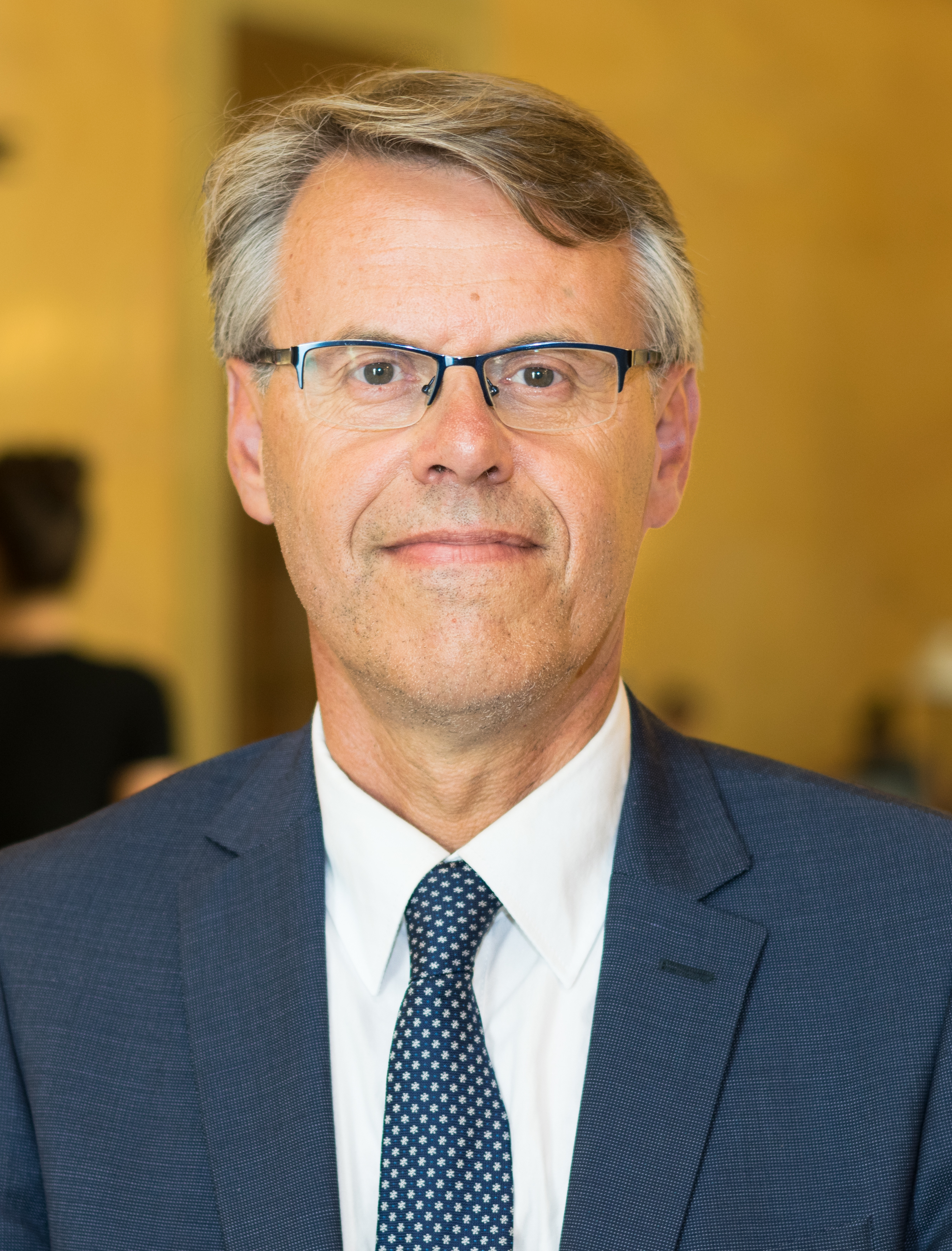

Member of the National Assembly for Doubs's 2nd constituency
- In office 20 June 2012 – 9 june 2024
- Preceded by: Jacques Grosperrin

Personal details
- Born: 7 June 1958 (age 67) Nancy, France
- Party: LV (1988–2010); EELV (2010–2017); RE (since 2017); TDP (2020–2022)

Éric Alauzet (born 7 June 1958) is a French politician of Renaissance (RE) who has been serving as a member of the National Assembly from the 2012 to 2024, representing the 2nd constituency of the department of Doubs.

== Political career ==
During his first term in the National Assembly from 2012 until 2017, Alauzet served on the Finance Committee. On 19 May 2016, together with five other MPs, he left the Green Group, causing its dissolution, and joined the Socialists' parliamentary group.

In the Socialist Party's primaries ahead of the 2017 presidential elections, Alauzet endorsed François de Rugy, even though his party had already nominated Yannick Jadot as its official candidate. Once Benoît Hamon was selected as the Socialist Party's candidate, however, he decided to support Emmanuel Macron instead.

Following the 2017 legislative elections, Alauzet joined the Finance Committee again. In 2019 he moved to the Committee on Sustainable Development and Spatial Planning. In addition to his committee assignments, he is a member of the French-Chinese Parliamentary Friendship Group.

In 2020, Alauzet joined En commun (EC), a group within LREM led by Barbara Pompili.

He was re-elected in the 2022 election.

== Political positions ==
In October 2017, Alauzet joined forces with Blandine Brocard to call for a moratorium on the government's plans for extending vaccination requirements for young children.

In July 2019, Alauzet voted against the ratification of the Comprehensive Economic and Trade Agreement (CETA), arguing that it "does not make it possible to respond to current issues, first and foremost the climate and biodiversity."

== See also ==
- 2012 French legislative election
- 2017 French legislative election
- 2022 French legislative election
