= Val-d'Oise's 6th constituency =

Legislative constituency in Île-de-France, France

6th constituency of Val-d'Oise
- inline Constituency of the National Assembly of France

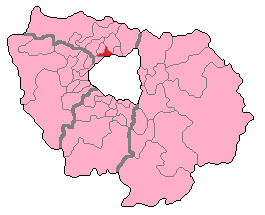
- Val-d'Oise's 6th Constituency shown within Île-de-France
- Deputy: Gabrielle Cathala; La France Insoumise
- Department: Val-d'Oise
- Cantons: Enghien-les-Bains - Saint-Gratien - Sannois - Soisy-sous-Montmorency
- Registered voters: 76,435

The 6th constituency of Val-d'Oise is a French legislative constituency in the Val-d'Oise département. It is currently represented by Gabrielle Cathala of La France Insoumise.

== Description ==
The 6th constituency of Val-d'Oise is one of a group of constituencies in the south the department which form part of the north western suburbs of the Paris Metropolitan Area.

Historically the constituency has elected conservatives but Christine Neracoulis of the PS came within 400 votes of capturing the seat at the 2012 elections.

== Historic representation ==
Election	Member	Party
1986	Proportional representation – no election by constituency	
1988	Jean-Pierre Delalande	RPR
1993	Jean-Pierre Delalande	RPR
1997	Jean-Pierre Delalande	RPR
2002	François Scellier	UMP
2007	François Scellier	UMP
2012	François Scellier	UMP
2017	Nathalie Élimas	MoDem
2020	David Corceiro	MoDem
2022	Nathalie Élimas	MoDem
2022	Estelle Folest	MoDem
2024	Gabrielle Cathala	LFI

== Election results ==
=== 2024 ===
Candidate	Party	Alliance	First round			Second round		
Candidate	Party	Alliance	Votes	%	+/–	Votes	%	+/–
Gabrielle Cathala	LFI	NFP	18,603	37.63	+7.79	21,326	43.64	-2.89
Estelle Folest	MoDem	ENS	12,745	25.78	+3.53	16,149	33.05	-20.42
Annika Bruna	RN		10,911	22.07	+10.17	11,389	23.31	N/A
Audrey Guilbaud	DVD		3,737	7.56	N/A			
Loïc Eléloué-Valmar	DVE		1,049	2.12	N/A			
Emmanuel Mikael	DVC		910	1.84	N/A			
Jean Bernard Lasmarrigues	REC		683	1.38	-4.46			
Christophe Celestin	DVC		427	0.86	N/A			
Agnès Reinmann	LO		370	0.75	-0.19			
Marine Dageville	NPA		0	0.00	N/A			
Valid votes			49,435	98.24	-0.21	48,864	98.07	+3.78
Blank votes			626	1.24	+0.12	738	1.48	-2.58
Null votes			260	0.52	+0.09	223	0.45	-1.20
Turnout			50,321	66.43	+21.16	49,825	65.75	+20.36
Abstentions			25,432	33.57	-21.16	25,954	34.25	-20.36
Registered voters			75,753			75,779		
Source: Ministry of the Interior, Le Monde
Result						LFI GAIN FROM MoDem		

=== 2022 ===
Legislative Election 2022: Val-d'Oise's 6th constituency
Party	Candidate	Votes	%	±%
LFI (NUPÉS)	Gabrielle Cathala	10,019	29.84	+7.73
MoDem (Ensemble)	Estelle Folest	7,470	22.25	-18.14
LR (UDC)	Nicolas Flament	4,125	12.29	−10.70
RN	Annika Bruna	3,994	11.90	+3.48
MoDem	Nathalie Élimas*	2,895	8.62	N/A
DVE	Samir Lassoued	1,979	5.89	N/A
REC	Anaïs Ferdel	1,961	5.84	N/A
DVE	Philippe Demarquez	816	2.43	N/A
EXG	Agnès Reinmann	317	0.94	N/A
Turnout		34,105	45.27	−0.44
2nd round result
MoDem (Ensemble)	Estelle Folest	17,245	53.47	-3.64
LFI (NUPÉS)	Gabrielle Cathala	15,006	46.53	N/A
Turnout		32,251	45.39	+6.66
MoDem hold				

* MoDem dissident

=== 2017 ===
Candidate	Label	First round		Second round	
Candidate	Label	Votes	%	Votes	%
Nathalie Élimas	MoDem	13,897	40.39	15,177	57.11
Luc Strehaiano	LR	7,910	22.99	11,396	42.89
Serge Grossvak	FI	4,135	12.02		
Jean-Michel Dubois	FN	2,896	8.42		
Guilaine Pestie	PS	1,493	4.34		
François Delcombre	ECO	1,278	3.71		
Leila Addou	PCF	702	2.04		
Alexandra Ferreira	DIV	523	1.52		
Dimitar Krastev	DLF	378	1.10		
Agnès Reinmann	EXG	259	0.75		
Léonard Diers	DIV	250	0.73		
Yohan Penel	DIV	221	0.64		
Anne Haimart	DVD	214	0.62		
Salim Meghiche	EXD	139	0.40		
Salim Drai	DVG	110	0.32		
Votes		34,405	100.00	26,573	100.00
Valid votes		34,405	98.48	26,573	89.76
Blank votes		375	1.07	1,581	5.34
Null votes		156	0.45	1,452	4.90
Turnout		34,936	45.71	29,606	38.73
Abstentions		41,499	54.29	46,832	61.27
Registered voters		76,435		76,438	
Source: Ministry of the Interior

=== 2012 ===
Legislative Election 2012: Val-d'Oise's 6th constituency
Party	Candidate	Votes	%	±%
PS	Christine Neracoulis	13,733	33.81	
UMP	François Scellier	10,331	25.44	
DVD	Luc Stregaiano	6,928	17.06	
FN	Michel Simonnot	4,174	10.28	
FG	Isabelle Volat	2,650	6.52	
EELV	François Delcombre	1,155	2.84	
MoDem	Nathalie Élimas	989	2.43	
Others	N/A	657		
Turnout		40,617	54.37	
2nd round result
UMP	François Scellier	19,572	50.49	
PS	Christine Neracoulis	19,195	49.51	
Turnout		38,767	51.89	
UMP hold				

=== 2007 ===
Legislative Election 2007: Val-d'Oise's 6th constituency
Party	Candidate	Votes	%	±%
UMP	François Scellier	20,254	48.78	
PS	Marie-Paule Georgelin	9,381	22.60	
MoDem	Haiba Ouaissi	4,294	10.34	
FN	Jean-Michel Dubois	2,000	4.82	
LV	François Delcombre	1,320	3.18	
PCF	Josiane Jeantils	1,112	2.68	
Far left	Irène Tine	860	2.07	
Others	N/A	2,297		
Turnout		41,972	57.86	
2nd round result
UMP	François Scellier	21,836	58.09	
PS	Marie-Paule Georgelin	15,752	41.91	
Turnout		38,642	53.27	
UMP hold				

=== 2002 ===
Legislative Election 2002: Val-d'Oise's 6th constituency
Party	Candidate	Votes	%	±%
UMP	François Scellier	14,849	36.76	
PS	Janine Haddad	8,839	21.88	
DVD	Yanick Paternotte	5,411	13.39	
FN	Jean-Michel Dubois	4,891	12.11	
LV	Francois Delcombre	1,508	3.73	
PCF	Josiane Jeantils	1,366	3.38	
Others	N/A	3,533		
Turnout		40,966	64.33	
2nd round result
UMP	François Scellier	22,000	61.26	
PS	Janine Haddad	13,910	38.74	
Turnout		37,175	58.38	
UMP hold				

=== 1997 ===
Legislative Election 1997: Val-d'Oise's 6th constituency
Party	Candidate	Votes	%	±%
RPR	Jean-Pierre Delalande	13,961	34.41	
PS	Delphine Marayrgue	9,317	22.96	
FN	Jean-Michel Dubois	7,480	18.43	
PCF	Josiane Jeantils	3,012	7.42	
LV	Jean-François Patingre	1,740	4.29	
DVD	Patrick Tharreau	1,255	3.09	
LO	Yves Cottençon	1,132	2.79	
GE	Jean-Louis Charbit	1,009	2.49	
Others	N/A	1,670		
Turnout		42,085	64.78	
2nd round result
RPR	Jean-Pierre Delalande	23,672	56.19	
PS	Delphine Marayrgue	18,458	43.81	
Turnout		44,518	68.51	
RPR hold				

== Sources ==
Official results of French elections from 2002: "Résultats électoraux officiels en France" (in French).
