= Paulette Guinchard-Kunstler =

French politician (1949–2021)

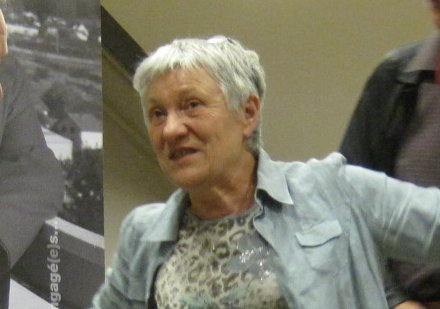
- Guinchard-Kunstler in 2012

Member of the National Assembly for Doubs's 2nd constituency
- In office 19 June 2002 – 19 June 2007
- Preceded by: Michel Bourgeois
- Succeeded by: Jacques Grosperrin
- In office 12 March 1997 – 28 March 2001
- Preceded by: Michel Jacquemin
- Succeeded by: Michel Bourgeois

Secretary of State for the Elderly
- In office 28 March 2001 – 6 May 2002
- President: Jacques Chirac
- Prime Minister: Lionel Jospin
- Preceded by: Dominique Gillot
- Succeeded by: Dominique Versini

Besançon Municipal Councillor
- In office 19 June 1995 – 18 February 2001

Regional Councillor for Franche-Comté
- In office 23 March 1989 – 21 June 1997

Deputy Mayor of Besançon
- In office 14 March 1983 – 19 June 1995

Personal details
- Born: 3 October 1949 Reugney, France
- Died: 4 March 2021 (aged 71) Bern, Switzerland
- Party: Socialist Party

Paulette Guinchard-Kunstler (3 October 1949 – 4 March 2021) was a French politician. She served on the National Assembly representing Doubs's 2nd constituency as a member of the Socialist Party.

== Biography ==
In 1983, Guinchard-Kunstler was appointed Deputy Mayor of Besançon by Robert Schwint, a position she held until 1995, when she was elected to the municipal council. In 1997, she was elected to the National Assembly, serving in Doubs's 2nd constituency. In 2001, she left the National Assembly following her appointment as Secretary of State for the Elderly by Prime Minister Lionel Jospin. That year, Robert Schwint announced his retirement as Mayor of Besançon. Guinchard-Kunstler's name was floated as a possibility, but Jean-Louis Fousseret obtained the Socialist Party nomination and eventually the seat.

In 2002, Guinchard-Kunstler returned to the National Assembly and became a vice president, alongside Hélène Mignon. On International Women's Day in 2005, she presided over the National Assembly and answered questions on television for one hour. In 2007, she became a part of the think tank Réformer, which was run by the Socialist Party. She decided not to seek reelection in the 2007 French legislative election.

In 2013, Guinchard-Kunstler became head of the Fondation de gérontologie. She then launched with Serge Guérin the Appel pour l'équité en faveur des aidants. The goal was to provide France's 10 million caregivers support and health protections. She achieved the rank of Officer of the Legion of Honour on 14 April 2017.

Paulette Guinchard-Kunstler died of assisted suicide in Switzerland on 4 March 2021 at the age of 71.
