= Ayda Hadizadeh =

French politician (born 1982)

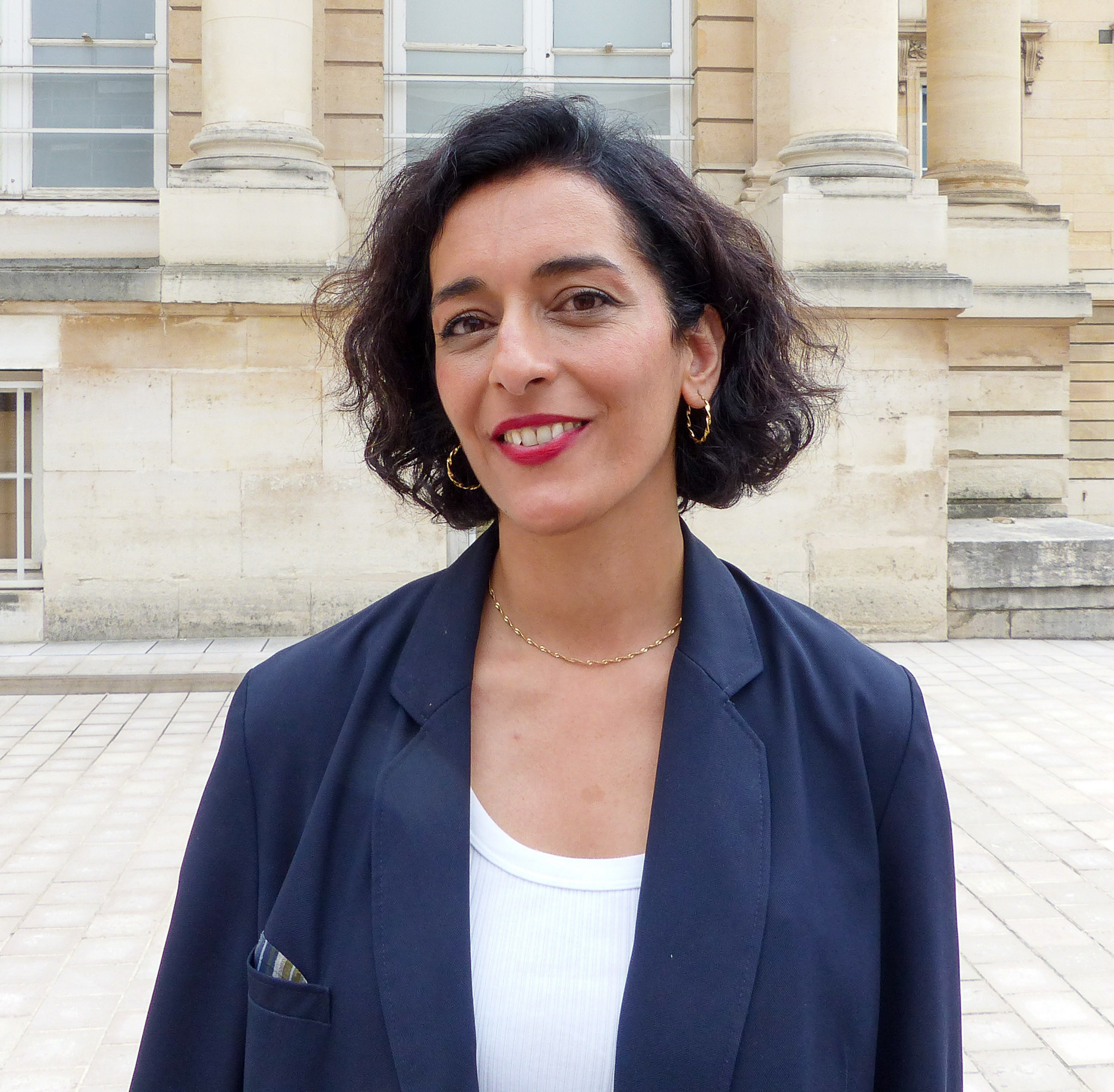
- Hadizadeh in 2024

Member of the French National Assembly for Val-d'Oise's 2nd constituency
- Incumbent
- Assumed office 18 July 2024
- Preceded by: Guillaume Vuilletet

Personal details
- Born: 12 February 1982 (age 44) Tehran, Iran
- Party: Socialist Party
- Other political affiliations: New Popular Front

Ayda Hadizadeh (born 12 February 1982) is a French politician of the Socialist Party. In the 2024 legislative election, she was elected member of the National Assembly for Val-d'Oise's 2nd constituency. She previously worked for the Direction générale de l'enseignement scolaire, and was a candidate for the constituency in the 2017 legislative election.
