= Axel Poniatowski =

French politician

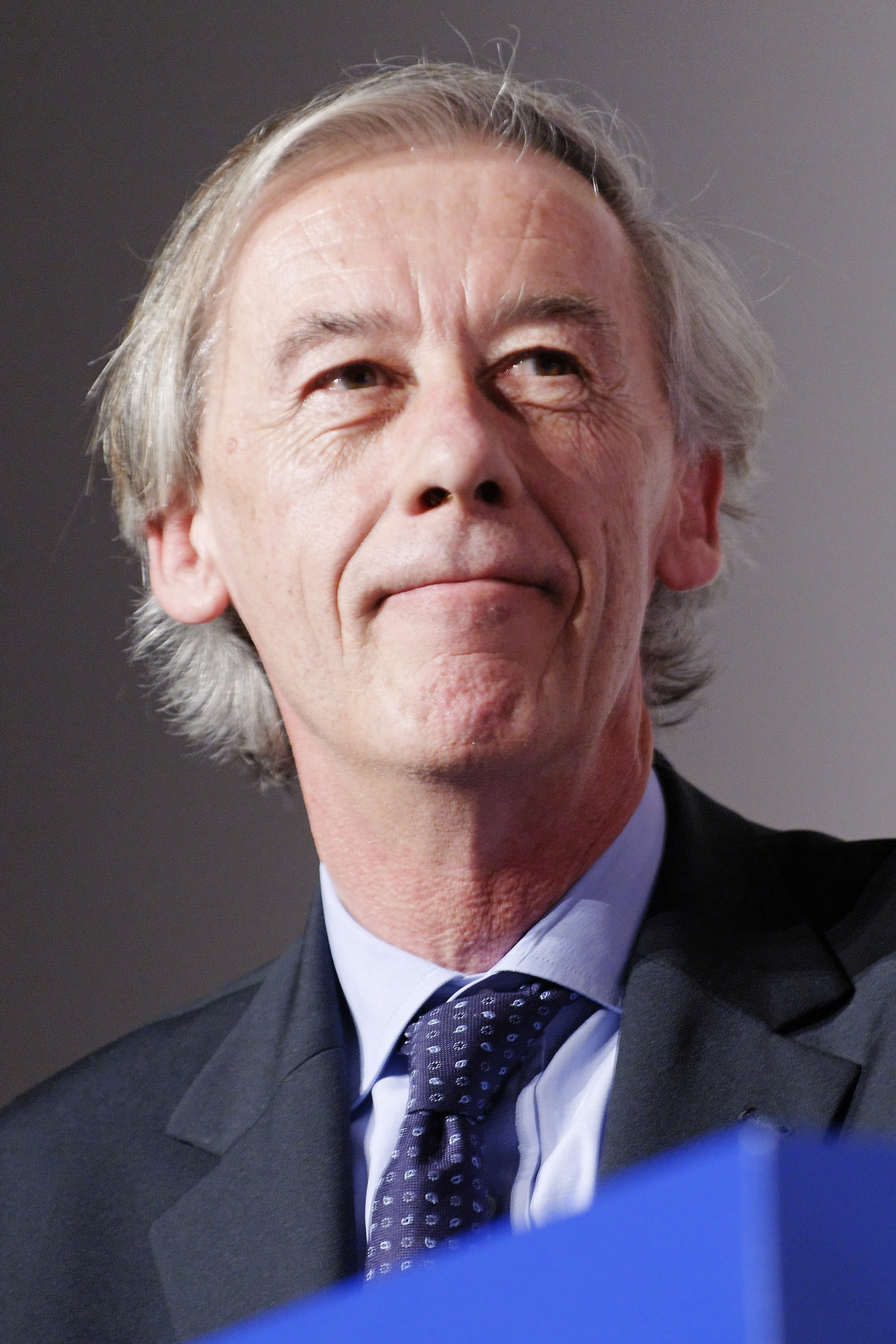

Member of the French National Assembly for Val-d'Oise's 2nd constituency
- In office 19 June 2002 – 20 June 2017
- Preceded by: Jean-Pierre Pernot
- Succeeded by: Guillaume Vuilletet

Mayor of L'Isle-Adam
- In office 2 February 1999 – September 2017
- Preceded by: Michel Poniatowski

Personal details
- Born: 3 August 1951 (age 75) Rabat, Morocco
- Party: The Republicans
- Education: ISG Business School

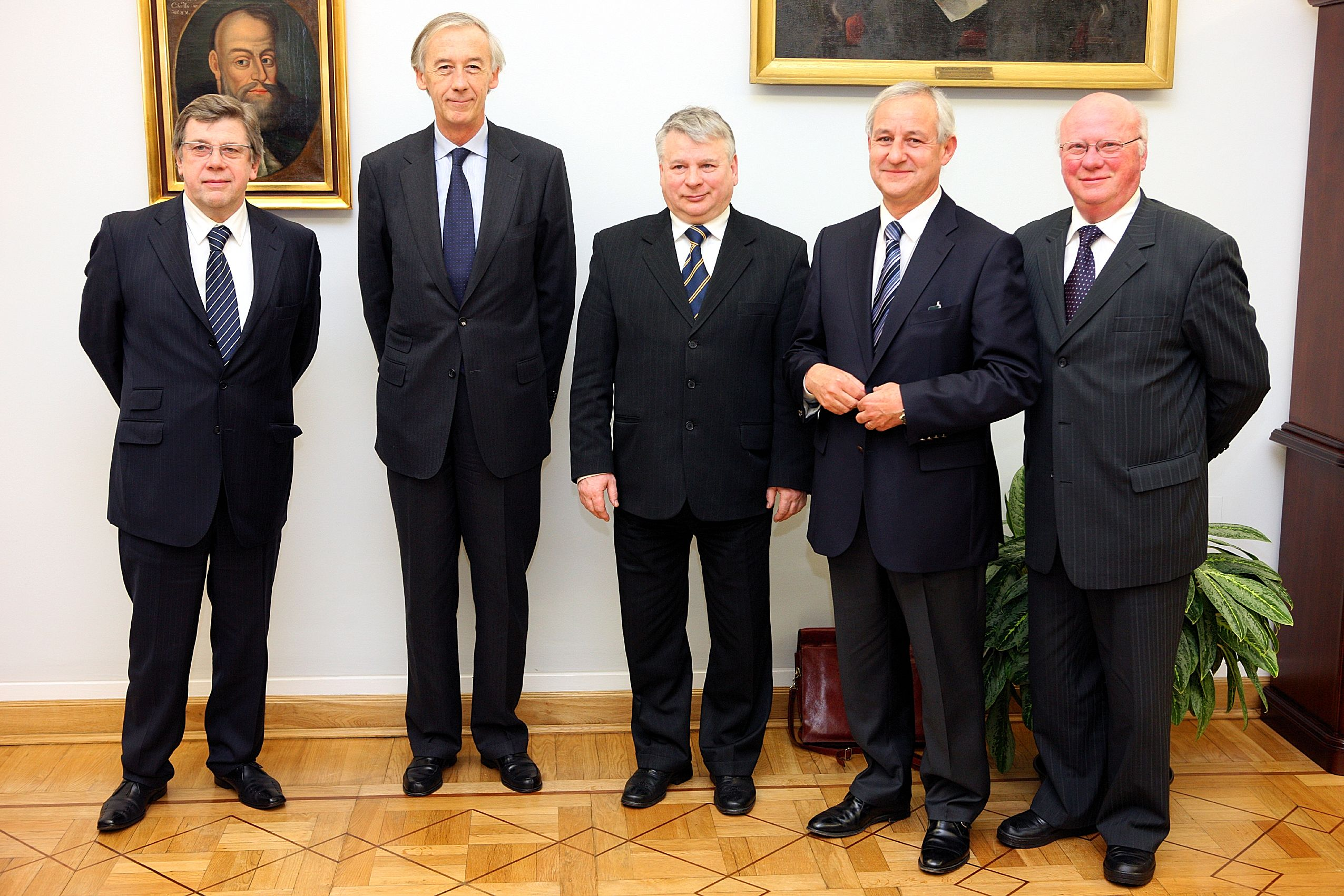
Poniatowski with a group of French MPs and Bogdan Borusewicz in the Polish Senate (2009)

Axel Poniatowski (born 3 August 1951) was a member of the National Assembly of France from 2002 to 2017. He represented Val-d'Oise's 2nd constituency, as a member of the Union for a Popular Movement.

== Biography ==
Prince Axel Poniatowski was born on 3 August 1951 in Rabat, Morocco. He grew up in Morocco and in the United States, following his father the diplomat Michel Poniatowski. Later, he also lived in the US for five more years, and in Saudi Arabia for three years. He was the mayor of Isle-Adam from 1999 to 2017. , and the Representative of Val d'Oise from 2002 to 2017. He served as the President of the foreign affairs commission in the French National Assembly. He was defeated in the 2017 election by Guillaume Vuilletet of La République En Marche! (LREM). He is a distant relative of the last king of Poland Stanisław II August and of Marshal Józef Poniatowski.

He worked in the private sector for 25 years. He speaks English, Spanish, and some Arabic. In 2008, he supported Barack Obama.

== See also ==
- Poniatowski family
