= Doubs's 2nd constituency =

Constituency of the National Assembly of France

2nd constituency of Doubs
- inline Constituency of the National Assembly of France

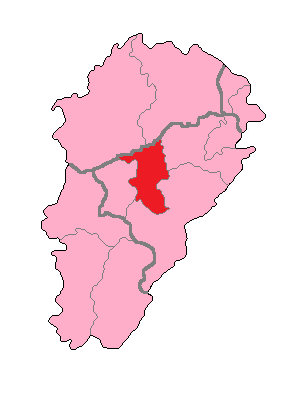
- The constituency shown within Franche-Comté
- Incumbent deputy: Dominique Voynet; LE
- Department: Doubs
- Cantons: Besançon Est, Besançon Nord-Est, Besançon Sud, Marchaux, Ornans, Roulans
- Registered voters: 78,394 (2017)

The 2nd constituency of Doubs (French: Deuxième circonscription du Doubs) is one of five electoral districts in the department of the same name, each of which returns one deputy to the French National Assembly in elections using the two-round system, with a run-off if no candidate receives more than 50% of the vote in the first round.

== Description ==
The constituency is made up of the six former cantons of Besançon Est, Besançon Nord-Est, Besançon Sud, Marchaux, Ornans, and Roulans.

At the time of the 1999 census (which was the basis for the most recent redrawing of constituency boundaries, carried out in 2010) the 2nd constituency had a total population of 105,622.

Since 1988 the seat has usually swung back-and-forth between left and right and was first won by Éric Alauzet of The Greens by the tiny margin of 108 votes in the 2012 election. Alauzet moved to La République En Marche! for the 2017 election.

== Historic representation ==
Election	Member	Party
1986	Proportional representation – no election by constituency	
1988	Michel Jacquemin	UDF
1997	Paulette Guinchard-Kunstler	PS
2007	Jacques Grosperrin	UMP
2012	Éric Alauzet	EELV
2017	Éric Alauzet	LREM
2022	Éric Alauzet	LREM
2024	Dominique Voynet	LE

== Election results ==
=== 2024 ===
Candidate	Party	Alliance	First round			Second round		
Candidate	Party	Alliance	Votes	%	+/–	Votes	%	+/–
Dominique Voynet	LE	NFP	19,160	34.15	+1.64	31,053	59.95	+12.20
Eric Fusis	RN		16,895	30.12	+12.63	20,749	40.05	new
Benoît Vuillemin	REN	Ensemble	15,026	26.79	-4.57	withdrew		
Daniel Roy	LR		4,215	7.52	-3.28			
Brigitte Vuitton	LO		788	1.41	-0.52			
Votes			56,084	100.00		51,802	100.00	
Valid votes			56,084	97.79	+0.56	51,802	90.19	-1.02
Blank votes			858	1.50	-0.47	4,253	7.40	+1.30
Null votes			408	0.71	-0.08	1,380	2.40	+0.29
Turnout			57,350	72.71	+20.32	57,435	72.80	+21.77
Abstentions			21,525	27.29	-20.32	21,459	27.20	-21.77
Registered voters			78,875			78,894		
Result			LE GAIN FROM RE					

=== 2022 ===
Legislative Election 2022: Doubs's 2nd constituency
Party	Candidate	Votes	%	±%
EELV (NUPÉS)	Stéphane Ravacley	13,112	32.51	+13.24
LREM (Ensemble)	Éric Alauzet	12,647	31.36	-11.07
RN	Eric Fusis	7,055	17.49	+6.17
LR (UDC)	Chafia Kaoulal	4,354	10.80	−10.18
REC	Barbara Carrau	1,472	3.65	N/A
Others	N/A	1,687	-	−
Turnout		40,327	52.39	+0.30
2nd round result
LREM (Ensemble)	Éric Alauzet	19,255	52.25	-9.94
EELV (NUPÉS)	Stéphane Ravacley	17,594	47.75	N/A
Turnout		36,849	51.03	+6.31
LREM hold				

=== 2017 ===
Candidate	Label	First round		Second round	
Candidate	Label	Votes	%	Votes	%
Éric Alauzet	ECO	16,894	42.43	19,672	62.19
Ludovic Fagaut	LR	8,353	20.98	11,960	37.81
Claire Arnoux	FI	4,950	12.43		
Julien Acard	FN	4,509	11.32		
Christophe Lime	PCF	2,725	6.84		
Alain François	ECO	737	1.85		
Jean-Claude Chomette	DLF	653	1.64		
Nadine de Maio	DIV	334	0.84		
Christine Latournerie	DIV	292	0.73		
Fabrice Delcambre	EXG	241	0.61		
José Da Cruz	DIV	131	0.33		
Votes		39,819	100.00	31,632	100.00
Valid votes		39,819	97.53	31,632	90.23
Blank votes		680	1.67	2,448	6.98
Null votes		327	0.80	979	2.79
Turnout		40,826	52.09	35,059	44.72
Abstentions		37,552	47.91	43,335	55.28
Registered voters		78,378		78,394	
Source: Ministry of the Interior

=== 2012 ===
2012 legislative election in Doubs's 2nd constituency
Candidate	Party	First round		Second round	
Candidate	Party	Votes	%	Votes	%
Jacques Grosperrin	UMP	17,179	36.84%	23,124	49.88%
Eric Alauzet	EELV	17,153	36.78%	23,232	50.12%
Valérie Moretto	FN	5,114	10.97%		
Annie Ménétrier	FG	3,709	7.95%		
Benoît Vuillemin		925	1.98%		
Philippe Gonon	MoDem	830	1.78%		
Elisabeth Gladstone	AEI	514	1.10%		
Jean-Claude Chomette	DLR	374	0.80%		
Julien Marcout	NPA	311	0.67%		
Brigitte Vuitton	LO	195	0.42%		
Johanna Clerc	SP	177	0.38%		
Jean-Pierre Joly	MPF	152	0.33%		
Valid votes		46,633	98.54%	46,356	97.15%
Spoilt and null votes		691	1.46%	1,361	2.85%
Votes cast / turnout		47,324	62.02%	47,717	62.53%
Abstentions		28,978	37.98%	28,588	37.47%
Registered voters		76,302	100.00%	76,305	100.00%

=== 2007 ===
Legislative Election 2007: Doubs's 2nd constituency
Party	Candidate	Votes	%	±%
UMP	Jacques Grosperrin	21,057	45.27	
PS	Marie-Guite Dufay	13,549	29.13	
MoDem	Odile Faivre-Petitjean	3,279	7.05	
LV	Sylvie Delorme	2,037	4.38	
FN	Josiane Oget	1,725	3.71	
PCF	Annie Memetrier	1,177	2.53	
EXG	François Portal	1,167	2.51	
Others	N/A	2,535	-	−
Turnout		47,123	62.51	
2nd round result
UMP	Jacques Grosperrin	24,416	52.68	
PS	Marie-Guite Dufay	21,934	47.32	
Turnout		47,654	63.22	
UMP gain from PS				

=== 2002 ===
Legislative Election 2002: Doubs's 2nd constituency
Party	Candidate	Votes	%	±%
PS	Paulette Guinchard-Kunstler	18,290	38.86	
UMP	Jean-Claude Duverget	17,085	36.30	
FN	Jean-Luc Bart	4,812	10.23	
LV	Eric Durand	1,331	2.83	
RPF	Jean-Claude Chomette	1,314	2.79	
Others	N/A	4,229	-	−
Turnout		47,963	68.59	
2nd round result
PS	Paulette Guinchard-Kunstler	23,414	52.56	
UMP	Jean-Claude Duverget	21,132	47.44	
Turnout		45,843	65.74	
PS hold				

=== 1997 ===
Legislative Election 1997: Doubs's 2nd constituency
Party	Candidate	Votes	%	±%
PS	Paulette Guinchard-Kunstler	12,199	27.95	
FD (UDF)	Michel Jacquemin	12,170	27.89	
FN	Sophie Montel	7,003	16.05	
PCF	Evelyne Ternant	2,301	5.27	
LV	Éric Alauzet	2,242	5.14	
LO	Marie-France Roche	1,420	3.25	
DIV	Jean-Claude Chomette	1,287	2.95	
LDI	Jean-Pierre Joly	1,275	2.92	
EXG	Sylvette Meyer	966	2.21	
DVE	Christophe Pomez	938	2.15	
MDR	Michel Helvas	927	2.12	
MEI	Serge Grass	912	2.09	
DIV	Jean-Marc La Garrec	0	0.00	
Turnout		46,107	69.29	
2nd round result
PS	Paulette Guinchard-Kunstler	24,573	51.78	
FD (UDF)	Michel Jacquemin	22,883	48.22	
Turnout		50,480	75.87	
PS gain from FD				

== Notes and references ==
Official results of French elections from 2002 taken from "Résultats électoraux officiels en France" (in French).
