= Gabrielle Cathala =

French politician (born 1992)

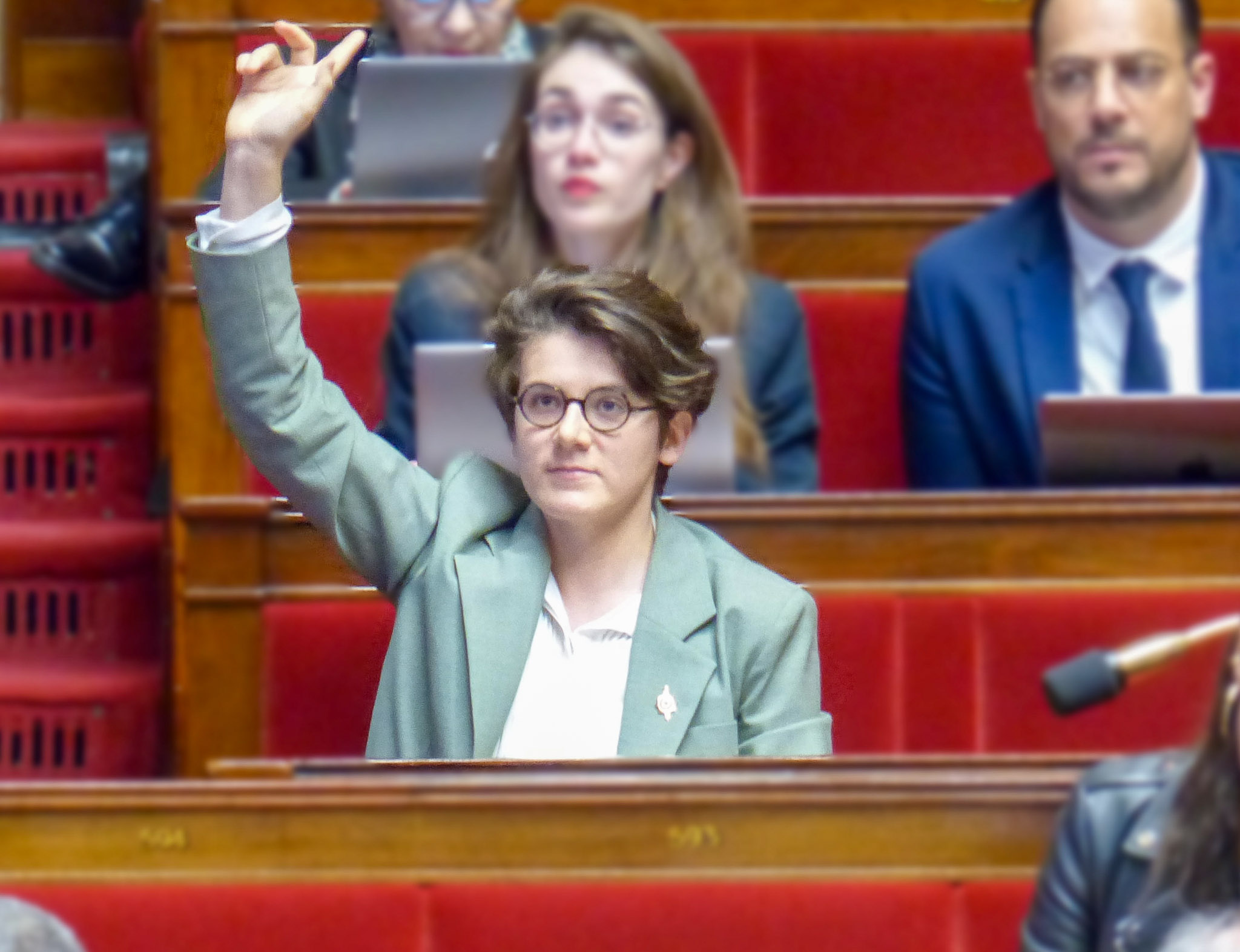
- Cathala in February 2025

Member of the National Assembly for Val-d'Oise's 6th constituency
- Incumbent
- Assumed office 18 July 2024
- Preceded by: Estelle Folest

Personal details
- Born: 14 May 1992 (age 34) Talence, France
- Party: La France Insoumise
- Other political affiliations: New Popular Front
- Education: Bordeaux Montesquieu University
- Profession: Jurist

Gabrielle Cathala (born 14 May 1992) is a French politician of La France Insoumise (LFI) who was elected member of the National Assembly for Val-d'Oise's 6th constituency in 2024. She was previously a candidate for the constituency in the 2022 legislative election.

In July 2025, Cathala, along with fellow LFI member and MEP Emma Fourreau and other activists, was on board the Gaza Freedom Flotilla, seeking to break Israel's blockade of the Gaza Strip. Between 26 and 27 July, the IDF seized the ship, towed it to the Port of Ashdod, and detained the activists on board, vowing to deport them to their respective countries. Cathala agreed to sign deportation papers and was set for immediate expulsion.
