= François Scellier =

French politician

François Scellier (born 7 May 1936 in Amiens, Somme) was a member of the National Assembly of France from 2002 to 2017, representing the 6th constituency of the Val-d'Oise department, as a member of the Radical Party.

== Biography ==
He was elected deputy on June 16, 2002, for the 12th legislature (2002-2007), in the Val-d'Oise's 6th constituency. A member of the Radical Party, he belongs to the Union for a Popular Movement group.

He was re-elected in 2007 and 2012. He was the oldest member of the National Assembly (France) at the start of the 14th legislative term and, as such, presided over the first session. He was behind two pieces of legislation adopted in 2009 concerning the housing sector: the Scellier Act and the Scellier BBC Act.

He supported Nicolas Sarkozy in the 2016 Republican presidential primary.

On November 8, 2007, François Scellier was found guilty of favoritism by the Pontoise Criminal Court. The court found that the former mayor of Saint-Gratien had violated the rules governing the awarding of two public contracts in 1996, including the extension of the Jean Zay school, but waived the sentence in light of the age of the case.
