= Buñuel (disambiguation) =

Buñuel may refer to:

== People ==
- Luis Buñuel (1900–1983), a Spanish-Mexican filmmaker
- Juan Luis Buñuel (1934–2017), a French-born filmmaker, son of the previous
- Diego Buñuel (born 1975), a French-American filmmaker, son of the previous

== Places ==
- Buñuel, a municipality in the province and autonomous community of Navarre, Spain

== Other ==
- Buñuel in the Labyrinth of the Turtles, a 2018 film about Luis Buñuel
