= Estelle Folest =

French politician (born 1976)

Member of the National Assembly for Val-d'Oise's 6th constituency
- In office 22 June 2022 – 9 June 2024
- Preceded by: David Corceiro
- Succeeded by: Gabrielle Cathala

Personal details
- Born: 17 June 1976 (age 49) Vitry-sur-Seine, France
- Party: MoDem

Estelle Folest (born 17 June 1976) is a French politician from the Democratic Movement who has been representing Val-d'Oise's 6th constituency in the National Assembly between 2022 and 2024.

== See also ==
- List of deputies of the 16th National Assembly of France
