= Christian Gourmelen =

French politician

Christian Gourmelen (born 1 August 1940) is a French politician.

Gourmelen was born in Sainte-Foy-la-Grande, France, on 1 August 1940. He served as mayor of Osny from 1971 to 2011. Gourmelen held a dual mandate as a member of the general council, representing the Canton of Cergy-Nord from 1982. For most of his career, he had been affiliated with the Republican Party and its successor, Liberal Democracy. However, Gourmelen announced in 2000 that he would not run for another term on the general council, due to disagreements with his party over previous monetary donations he had given the party and their financial support of his campaign. Gourmelen sat in the National Assembly between 1993 and 1997, representing Val-d'Oise's 2nd constituency.
