= Dominique Gillot =

French politician (born 1949)

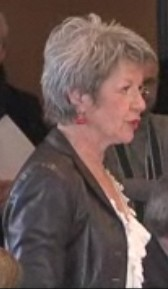

Secretary of State for Health and Social action
- In office 28 July 1999 – 7 February 2001
- President: Jacques Chirac
- Prime Minister: Lionel Jospin
- Succeeded by: Paulette Guinchard-Kunstler

Personal details
- Born: 11 July 1949 (age 77) Conflans-Sainte-Honorine, France
- Party: Socialist Party
- Profession: Teacher

Dominique Gillot (French: [dɔminik ʒilo]; born 11 July 1949) is a French politician. She is a member of the Socialist Party and was the French Minister of Health from 1999 to 2001, as well as a member of the 11th National Assembly from 1997 to 1999. In 2001, she was elected mayor of Éragny-sur-Oise. She was reelected in 2008, but lost her bid for a third term in March 2014 to her right-wing opponent. She held the office of Senator of the French Republic since 2011. She did not seek reelection to the Senate when her term ended in 2017.
