= François Bunel the Younger =

French historical painter

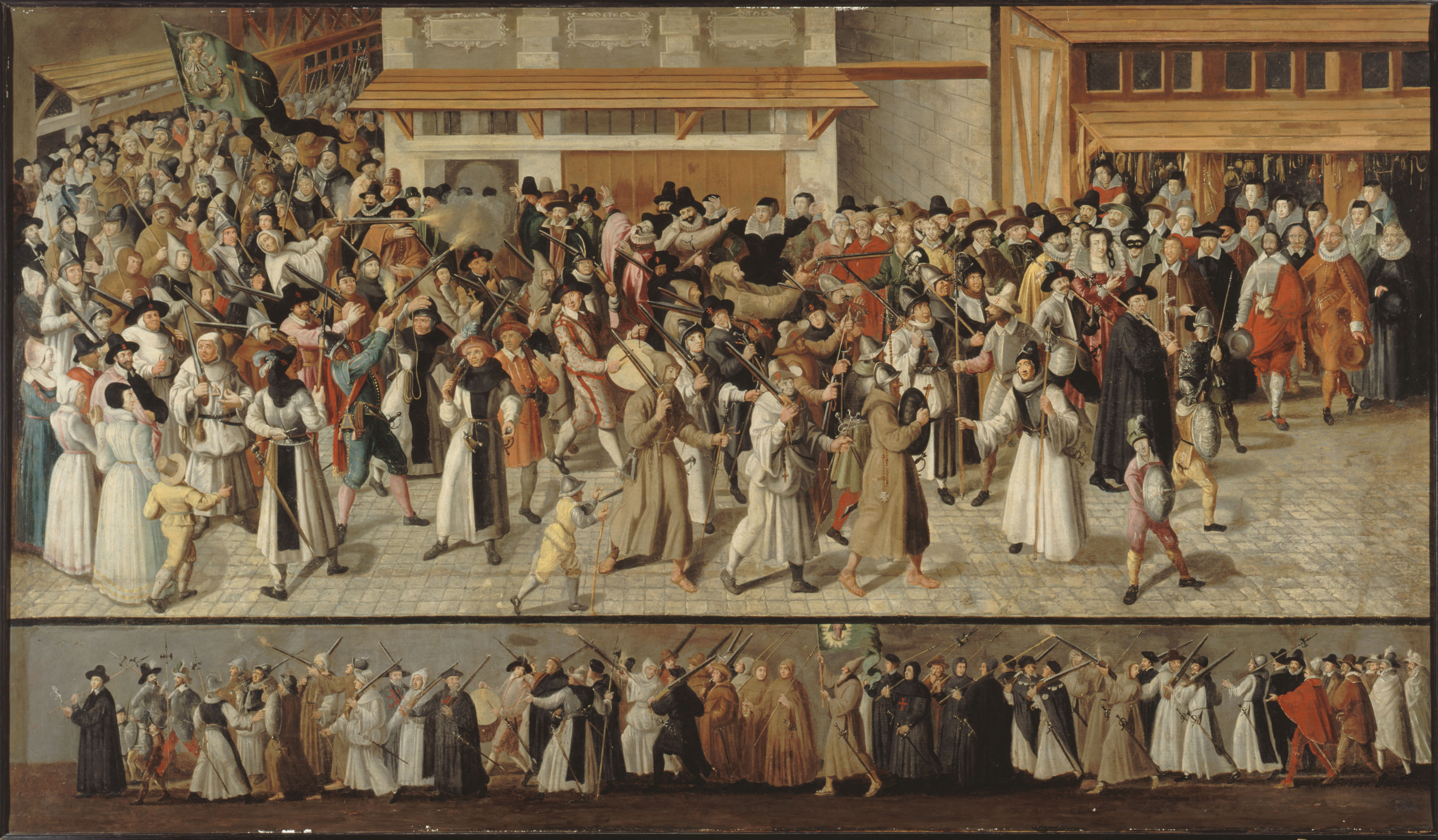
Procession of the League at the Île de la Cité, now at the Carnavalet Museum.

François Bunel, a French historical painter, flourished at Blois in 1550. He was a distinguished artist, who painted many religious subjects for churches.
