= Guillaume Vuilletet =

French politician

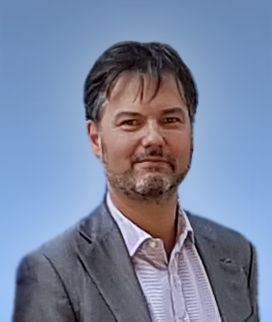

Vice-president of the La République En Marche group in the National Assembly
- In office 29 September 2020 – 9 June 2024
- President: Christophe Castaner

Member of the National Assembly for Val-d'Oise's 2nd constituency
- In office 21 June 2017 – 9 June 2024
- Preceded by: Axel Poniatowski

Secretary-General of the Ecologist Party
- Incumbent
- Assumed office 2 September 2015
- President: François de Rugy
- Preceded by: Office established

Deputy Mayor of Méry-sur-Oise
- In office March 2008 – March 2014

Regional Councillor of Île-de-France
- In office 28 March 2004 – 18 December 2015
- President: Jean-Paul Huchon

Personal details
- Born: 20 July 1967 (age 59) Beauvais, France
- Party: La République En Marche!
- Other political affiliations: Citizen and Republican Movement (until 2010); Europe Ecology – The Greens (2010–2015); Ecologist Party (2015–present)
- Education: Panthéon-Sorbonne University
- Profession: Independent consultant

Guillaume Vuilletet (born 20 July 1967) is a French politician who served as Member of the National Assembly for Val-d'Oise's 2nd constituency from 2017 to 2024. He is a member of La République En Marche! (LREM) and previously served on the Regional Council of Île-de-France.

Vuilletet was a member of Europe Ecology – The Greens (EELV) from 2010 to 2015 before co-founding the Ecologist Party with François de Rugy. He is currently the party's secretary-general and, along with de Rugy, endorsed Emmanuel Macron in the 2017 French presidential election.

Vuilletet was nominated by LREM in the 2017 French legislative elections in Val-d'Oise and was elected deputy for the department's 2nd constituency.

== Professional career ==
From 2009 to 2017, Vuilletet worked as an independent consultant specializing in territorial development, particularly in terms of housing issues.

== Political career ==
Vuilletet began his life in politics in 1988, working as a parliamentary assistant until 1993. From 1995 to 1999, he was the director of the cabinet of the mayor of Le Kremlin-Bicêtre. Vuilletet then served as parliamentary adviser to Minister of the Interior Jean-Pierre Chevènement as well as the deputy director of Chevènement's 2002 French presidential campaign. It was in the former position that Vuilletet participated in the introduction of many bills in the National Assembly, such as the RESEDA law on the entry of foreigners to France on 11 May 1998 and the right to asylum as well as the law on the reform of intercommunality on 12 June 1999.

As a member of the public relations department of the Economic and Social Committee from October 2003 to October 2005, Vuilletet was the rapporteur for a committee study entitled "International Comparison of International Student Entry Policies: What Finalities? What Methods?".

From April 2004 to December 2015, Vuilletet served as a regional councillor of Île-de-France, sitting on the culture and communications technology, international relations, European affairs and territorial development committees. He was subsequently elected president of the Regional Agency of the Territories and the Information Society in Île-de-France (ARTESI-Île-de-France), serving from October 2008 to March 2010 and participating in several parliamentary conferences on digital technology in France and territorial development.

Vuilletet was also vice-president of the Hubertine Auclair Centre (Centre Hubertine Auclair), an Île-de-France organization dedicated to gender equality. He additionally held the position of vice-president of the regional tourism committee of Île-de-France.

After completing his tenure on the regional council, Vuilletet became the deputy mayor of Méry-sur-Oise from March 2008 to March 2014, in which position he was responsible for urban planning, tourism and commerce. He joined Europe Ecology – The Greens (EELV) in 2010, but left in 2015 to co-found the Ecologist Party with François de Rugy as part of the Union of Democrats and Ecologists (UDE). Vuilletet served as the secretary-general of the new party.

Vuilletet and de Rugy endorsed Emmanuel Macron in the 2017 French presidential election. In the concurrent 2017 French legislative elections, Vuilletet was nominated by Macron's La République En Marche! in Val-d'Oise's 2nd constituency, which consists of parts of Cergy and the Pays de France. On 18 June 2017, he was elected deputy, defeating incumbent Axel Poniatowski.

=== Parliamentary offices ===
In parliament, Vuilletet served as a member of the Office of the National Assembly, presided over by de Rugy; the Office of the Committee on Constitutional Laws, Legislation and the General Administration of the Republic, presided over by Yaël Braun-Pivet; and the Law Committee. He was also part of the French-Chinese Parliamentary Friendship Group, the German-Portuguese Parliamentary Friendship Group and the overseas delegation of the National Assembly.

In September 2020, Vuilletet became the vice-president of whip coordination of the La République En Marche group, led by Christophe Castaner.

== Later career ==
In 2025, Vuilletet was appointed special adviser to President Emmanuel Macron.

== Personal life ==
On 9 March 2020, during the COVID-19 pandemic, Vuilletet said in a Twitter post that he had tested positive for COVID-19.

== Political offices ==
=== National ===
- Member of the National Assembly for Val-d'Oise's 2nd constituency since 19 June 2017
- Member of the Office of the National Assembly since 29 June 2017
- Member of the Office of the Law Committee since 29 June 2017

=== Regional and local ===
- Regional councillor of Île-de-France from April 2004 to December 2015
- Deputy mayor of Méry-sur-Oise from March 2008 to March 2014, responsible for urban planning, tourism and commerce

=== Other ===
- Secretary-general of the Ecologist Party since 2015
