= Pierre-Henri Bunel =

French artillery and intelligence officer

Pierre-Henri Bunel (born 1952) is a former French artillery and intelligence officer. He became publicly known after having leaked sensitive NATO documents during the Kosovo war, for which he served a jail sentence in 2001–2002. He later worked in construction and as a writer on NATO war crimes and Islamic extremism.

== Career ==
After graduating from the prestigious military academy of Saint-Cyr, he entered the French Army in 1972 and obtained the rank of major. During the Gulf War, he was an aide to General Michel Roquejeoffre and was an explosive expert serving with General Schwarzkopf. He was decorated by Schwarzkopf along with three other Frenchmen. Prior to his arrest, he had been recommended as the head of the French military intelligence. He participated in French and NATO operations in Somalia, Iraq, Rwanda, Bosnia and Yugoslavia. General Rideau, whom Bunel served under in Bosnia, called Bunel a man of "great culture", and "an intelligence officer of outstanding quality".

== Yugoslav Wars ==
At the time of the Kosovo War, Bunel was a major and chief of staff of the French representation at the NATO military committee at Brussels. At the end of 1998 he was arrested by French police upon flagging by US intelligence, accused of leaking sensitive documents to the Yugoslav side. He admitted to having passed documents indicating future aerial strikes against FR Yugoslavia between July and October 1998 to Yugoslav colonel Jovan Milanović. At first, he insisted he had acted to avoid a humanitarian disaster, his lawyer then claimed that he had been following orders from the DPSD. He said "I am not a traitor... I was asked to tell a Serb intelligence officer that the only way for Milosevic to avoid massive bombardments was to pull out of Kosovo". Other NATO countries suspected that the leak was authorized by his superiors. French officers had earlier leaked military information to the Serb leadership in the Bosnian War. After the prosecutor declared his claims as "unbelievable", he changed his story and said he acted on his own, and the prosecution took it further and claimed he was mentally unstable. He received no money or other compensation from the Serbians.

On 15 December 2001 he was found guilty of treason, sentenced to five years in prison by the Tribunal militaire aux armées. He was condemned and demoted in rank and sentenced to five years in prison. Three years were suspended, he was freed from La Santé Prison in spring 2002.

French general Guy le Pichon believed "he wanted to show the Serbs that matters were serious". In 2013, he received the Serbian Medal for Bravery. In interviews with Serbian newspaper Novosti in 2024, Bunel said he felt no remorse. He views the NATO bombings of Serbia as a war crime, against the Geneva Convention as it also targeted civilians, and that Kosovo was stolen from Serbia.

== Writer ==
In 2001 he authored a book on NATO war crimes and another book on Islamic extremism. In 2002, he collaborated in the book by Thierry Meyssan, Le Pentagate, for which he wrote chapter 4 titled The effect of a shaped charge, which disputes the official version of the attack on the Pentagon in 2001 and alleges that the attack was made by a missile.

He has also translated into French the works of David Ray Griffin, a philosopher of religion and philosophy, who contests the official version of the September 11 attacks.

== Works ==
- Crimes de guerre à l'OTAN, Éditions n°1, 2000; complété et réédité chez Carnot, en 2001.
- Mes services secrets : Souvenirs d'un agent de l'ombre, Flammarion, 2001.
- Menaces islamistes, Carnot, 2001.
- Proche-Orient : Une guerre mondiale, Carnot, 2004.
- Le Cederom Montsegur Roman cryptographique, éditions ACE, 2004.

== Sources ==
- Čvorović, Goran (24 March 2024). "СРБИМА БИХ ОПЕТ ПОМАГАО! Пјер Анри Бинел, мајор који је открио НАТО планове". Belgrade: Novosti.
- Frum, David; Perle, Richard (2003). An End to Evil: How to Win the War on Terror. Random House Publishing Group. ISBN 978-1-58836-360-2.
- Dubois, Francis; Stuart, Paul (21 December 2001). "France: Former intelligence officer Bunel jailed". WSWS.
- Jean Chichizola, "Pierre-Henri Bunel, l'espion français dans les Balkans" Le Figaro 14 October 2007
- "French major jailed as Serb spy" BBC News. 12 December 2001
- Stephen Jessel, "French officer 'spied for Serbs'", BBC News. November 2, 1998
- "French Nato spy faces treason trial" BBC News. 19 October 2001
