= Canton of Châteauneuf-sur-Sarthe =

Coordinates: 47°41′35″N 0°33′41″W

The Canton of Châteauneuf-sur-Sarthe is a former French canton located in the Maine-et-Loire département of France, in the arrondissement of Segré. It had 13,267 inhabitants (2012). It was disbanded following the French canton reorganisation which came into effect in March 2015. It consisted of 15 communes, which joined the canton of Tiercé in 2015.

The canton comprised the following communes:

- Châteauneuf-sur-Sarthe
- Brissarthe
- Champigné
- Champteussé-sur-Baconne
- Chemiré-sur-Sarthe
- Chenillé-Changé
- Cherré
- Contigné
- Juvardeil
- Marigné
- Miré
- Querré
- Sceaux-d'Anjou
- Sœurdres
- Thorigné-d'Anjou

== See also ==
- Cantons of the Maine-et-Loire department
- Communes of the Maine-et-Loire department
