= Maine-et-Loire's 1st constituency =

Constituency of the National Assembly of France

1st constituency of Maine-et-Loire
- inline Constituency of the National Assembly of France

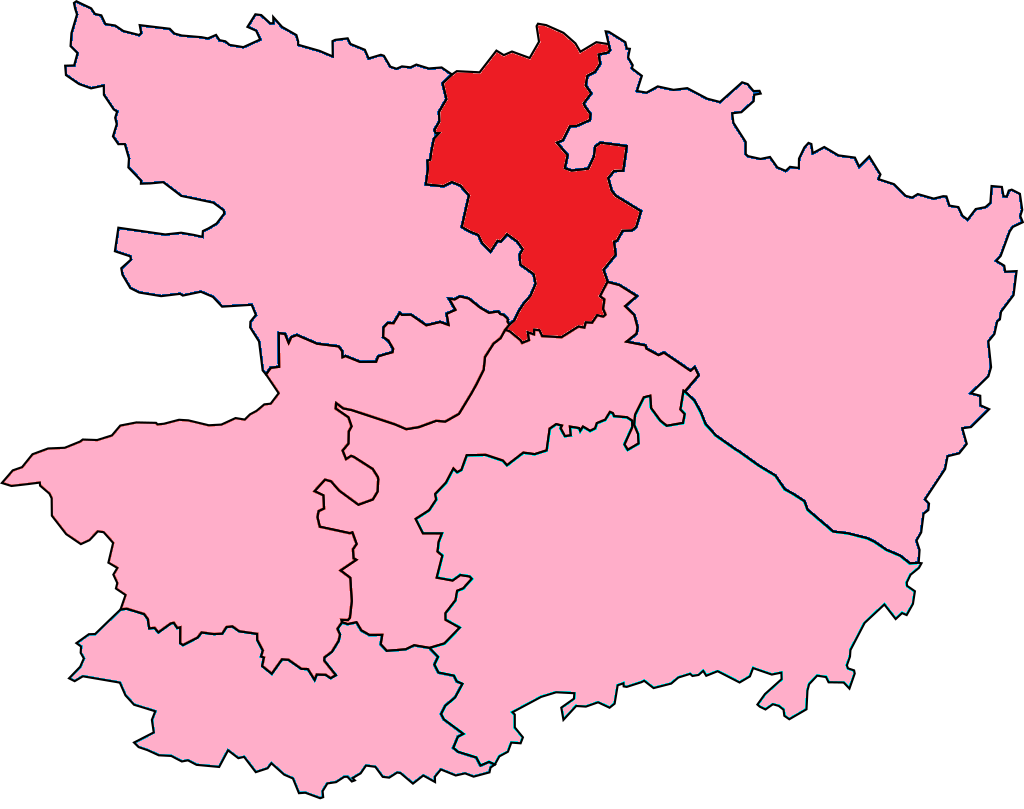
- Maine-et-Loire's 1st Constituency shown within Maine-et-Loire
- Deputy: François Gernigon; H
- Department: Maine-et-Loire
- Cantons: Angers Centre, Angers Est, Angers Nord-Est, Châteauneuf-sur-Sarthe, Tiercé
- Registered voters: 84090

The 1st constituency of Maine-et-Loire (French: Première circonscription de Maine-et-Loire) is a French legislative constituency in the Maine-et-Loire département. Like the other 576 French constituencies, it elects one MP using a two round electoral system.

== Description ==
The 1st Constituency of Maine-et-Loire is situated in the north of the department. It includes the central and some northern portions of the city of Angers along with the more rural cantons of Châteauneuf-sur-Sarthe and Tiercé.

The seat had been a stronghold of the centre right UDR and its successor parties the RPR and the UMP. However, in 2012 the seat was captured by the Socialist Party before falling into the hands of Emmanuel Macron's La République En Marche! in 2017. In 2020, the deputy, Matthieu Orphelin, was one of the LREM deputies who left to form Ecology Democracy Solidarity.

== Assembly members ==
Election	Member	Party
1988	Roselyne Bachelot-Narquin	RPR
1993	Roselyne Bachelot-Narquin	RPR
1997	Roselyne Bachelot-Narquin	RPR
2002	René Bouin	UMP
2007	Paul Jeanneteau	UMP
2012	Luc Belot	PS
2017	Matthieu Orphelin	LREM
2020	Matthieu Orphelin	EDS
2022	François Gernigon	H

== Election results ==
=== 2024 ===
Candidate	Party	Alliance	First round		Second round	
Candidate	Party	Alliance	Votes	%	Votes	%
François Gernigon	HOR	Ensemble	21,087	34.83	24,719	40.54
Elsa Richard	ECO	NPF	20,475	33.82	21,621	35.46
Hugo Louvigné	RN		13,995	23.12	14,629	23.99
Séverine Lécuyer	LR		3,736	6.17		
Marie-Louise Dupas	LO		642	1.06		
Roselyne Prunière	R!		432	0.71		
Anthony Gouas	NPA		173	0.29		
Valid votes			60,540	97.53	60,969	97.90
Blank votes			1,016	1.64	976	1.57
Null votes			518	0.83	330	0.53
Turnout			62,074	70.00	62,275	70.21
Abstentions			26601	30.00	26,424	29.79
Registered voters			88,675		88,699	
Result			HOR HOLD			

=== 2022 ===
Legislative Election 2022: Maine-et-Loire's 1st constituency
Party	Candidate	Votes	%	±%
HOR (Ensemble)	François Gernigon	15,381	34.90	-4.07
G.s (NUPÉS)	Arash Saeidi	13,163	29.87	+0.02
RN	Gabriel De Chabot	5,484	12.44	+5.02
LR (UDC)	Roch Brancour	4,508	10.23	−4.32
FGR	David Cayla	2,748	6.24	N/A
REC	Tristan Bovier-Lapierre	1,631	3.70	N/A
Others	N/A	1,157	2.63	
Turnout		44,072	51.14	−0.91
2nd round result
HOR (Ensemble)	François Gernigon	22,724	55.52	-8.81
G.s (NUPÉS)	Arash Saeidi	18,207	44.48	N/A
Turnout		40,931	49.50	+10.38
HOR gain from LREM				

=== 2017 ===
Legislative Election 2017: Maine-et-Loire's 1st constituency
Party	Candidate	Votes	%	±%
LREM	Matthieu Orphelin	17,058	38.97	N/A
LR	Caroline Fel	6,369	14.55	−21.20
PS	Luc Belot	5,971	13.64	−26.81
LFI	Manon Cantin	4,939	11.28	N/A
FN	Marie Baron	3,249	7.42	−1.15
EELV	Romain Laveau	2,159	4.93	+1.10
DIV	Valentin Rambault	914	2.09	N/A
Others	N/A	3,110		
Turnout		43,769	52.05	−5.81
2nd round result
LREM	Matthieu Orphelin	21.158	64.33	N/A
LR	Caroline Fel	11,734	35.67	−11.69
Turnout		32,892	39.12	−18.14
LREM gain from PS				

=== 2012 ===
Legislative Election 2012: Maine-et-Loire's 1st constituency
Party	Candidate	Votes	%	±%
PS	Luc Belot	18,940	40.45	
UMP	Paul Jeanneteau	16,738	35.75	
FN	Gaëtan Dirand	4,011	8.57	
FG	Isabelle Lelievre	1,797	3.84	
EELV	Jamila Delmotte	1,795	3.83	
AC	Louis-Marie Bachelot	1,645	3.51	
Others	N/A	1,897		
Turnout		46,823	57.86	
2nd round result
PS	Luc Belot	24,391	52.64	
UMP	Paul Jeanneteau	21,944	47.36	
Turnout		46,335	57.26	
PS gain from UMP				
