= Bachelot =

Bachelot (English: /bæˈʃloʊ/, French: [baʃlo]) is a surname. Notable people with the surname include:

- Alexis Bachelot, SS.CC., P.A., (1796–1837), Roman Catholic priest and the Prefect Apostolic of the Sandwich Islands (present Hawaii)
- François Bachelot (1940–2019), French physician and politician
- Jean Bachelot La Pylaie (1786–1856), French botanist, explorer and archaeologist
- Jean-François Bachelot (born 1977), retired professional tennis player from France
- Roselyne Bachelot (born 1946), French politician
