= René Bouin =

French politician (1937–2018)

Member of the National Assembly for Maine-et-Loire's 1st constituency
- In office 2002–2007
- Preceded by: Roselyne Bachelot
- Succeeded by: Roselyne Bachelot

Mayor of Chenillé-Changé
- In office 1977–2015

Personal details
- Born: 23 April 1937 Chenillé-Changé, France
- Died: 7 October 2018 (aged 81) France
- Party: UMP

René Bouin (23 April 1937 – 7 October 2018) was a French politician who served as a Deputy from 2002 to 2007, and as Mayor of Chenillé-Changé from 1977 to 2001. He was a member of the Union for a Popular Movement.
