= Cherré =

Cherré may refer to:

- Cherré (archaeological site), in the Sarthe department, France
- Cherré, Maine-et-Loire, a commune in the Maine-et-Loire department, France
- Cherré, Sarthe, a commune in the Sarthe department, France
