= Henri Lebasque =

French painter (1865–1937)

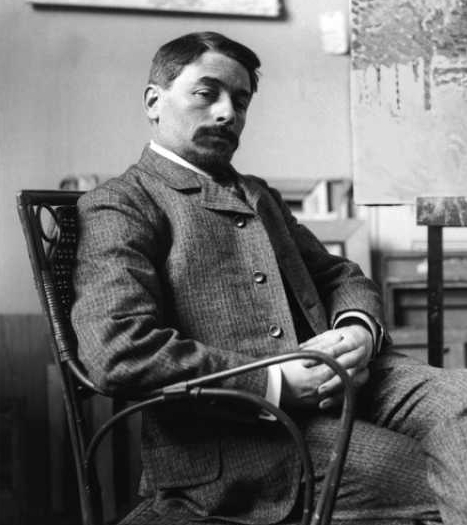
- Henri Lebasque, photo c.1900
- Born: 25 September 1865; Champigné, Maine-et-Loire, France
- Died: 7 August 1937 (aged 71); Le Cannet, Alpes-Maritimes, France
- Known for: Painter
- Movement: Post-Impressionism

Henri Lebasque (25 September 1865 – 7 August 1937) was a French Post-Impressionist painter. He was born at Champigné (Maine-et-Loire). His work is represented in French museums, notably Angers, Geneva (Petit Palais), Lille (Musée des Beaux-Arts), Nantes, and Paris (Musée d’Orsay).

== Education and artistic development ==
He started his education at the École régionale des beaux-arts d'Angers, and moved to Paris in 1886. There, Lebasque started studying under Léon Bonnat, and assisted Ferdinand Humbert with the decorative murals at the Panthéon. Around this time, Lebasque met Camille Pissarro and Auguste Renoir, who later would have a large impact on his work.

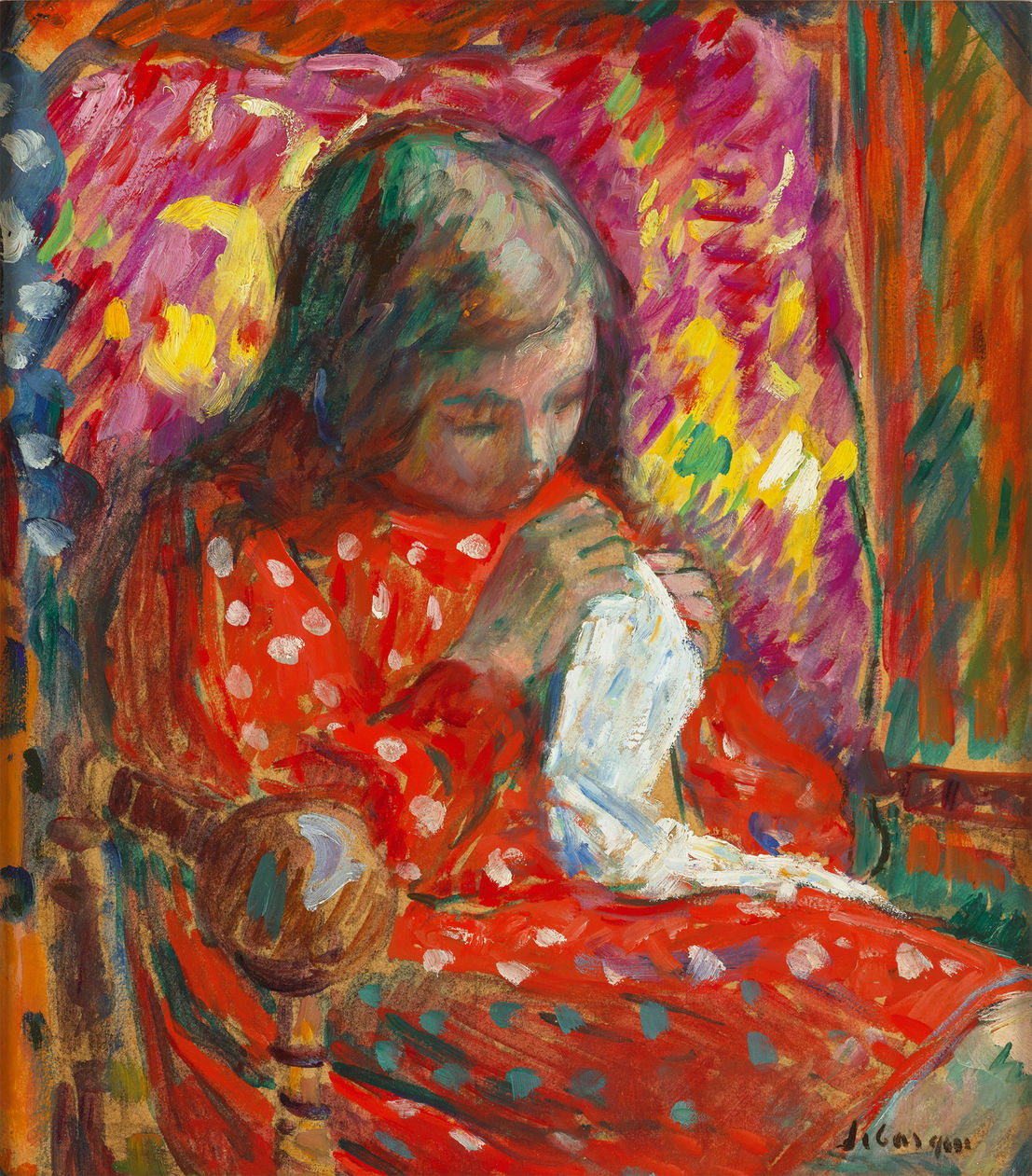
Henri Lebasque, Jeune fille cousant, ca. 1906

Lebasque's vision was coloured by his contact with younger painters, especially Édouard Vuillard and Pierre Bonnard, founders of Les Nabis, a group of Intimist painters that first favoured the calm and quietude of domestic subject matter. From his first acquaintance with Georges Seurat and Paul Signac, Lebasque learnt the significance of a colour theory which stressed the use of complementary colours in shading.

== Career ==
Lebasque was a founding member of the Salon d'Automne in 1903 with his friend Henri Matisse and exhibited at the Salon des Indépendants. Two years later, a group of artists exhibited there including Georges Rouault, André Derain, Henri Ottmann, Édouard Vuillard, and Matisse. Lebasque also became friends with artists such as Raoul Dufy, Louis Valtat, and Henri Manguin, the last of whom introduced Lebasque to the South of France.

His time in South of France would lead to a radical transformation in Lebasque's paintings, changing his colour palette forever. Other travels included the Vendée, Normandy, and Brittany.

Lebasque had some commercial success during his lifetime. He worked on the decorations at the theatre of the Champs-Elysées and of the Transatlantique sealiner.

Lebasque died at Cannet, Alpes Maritimes in 1937.

== Gallery of paintings ==
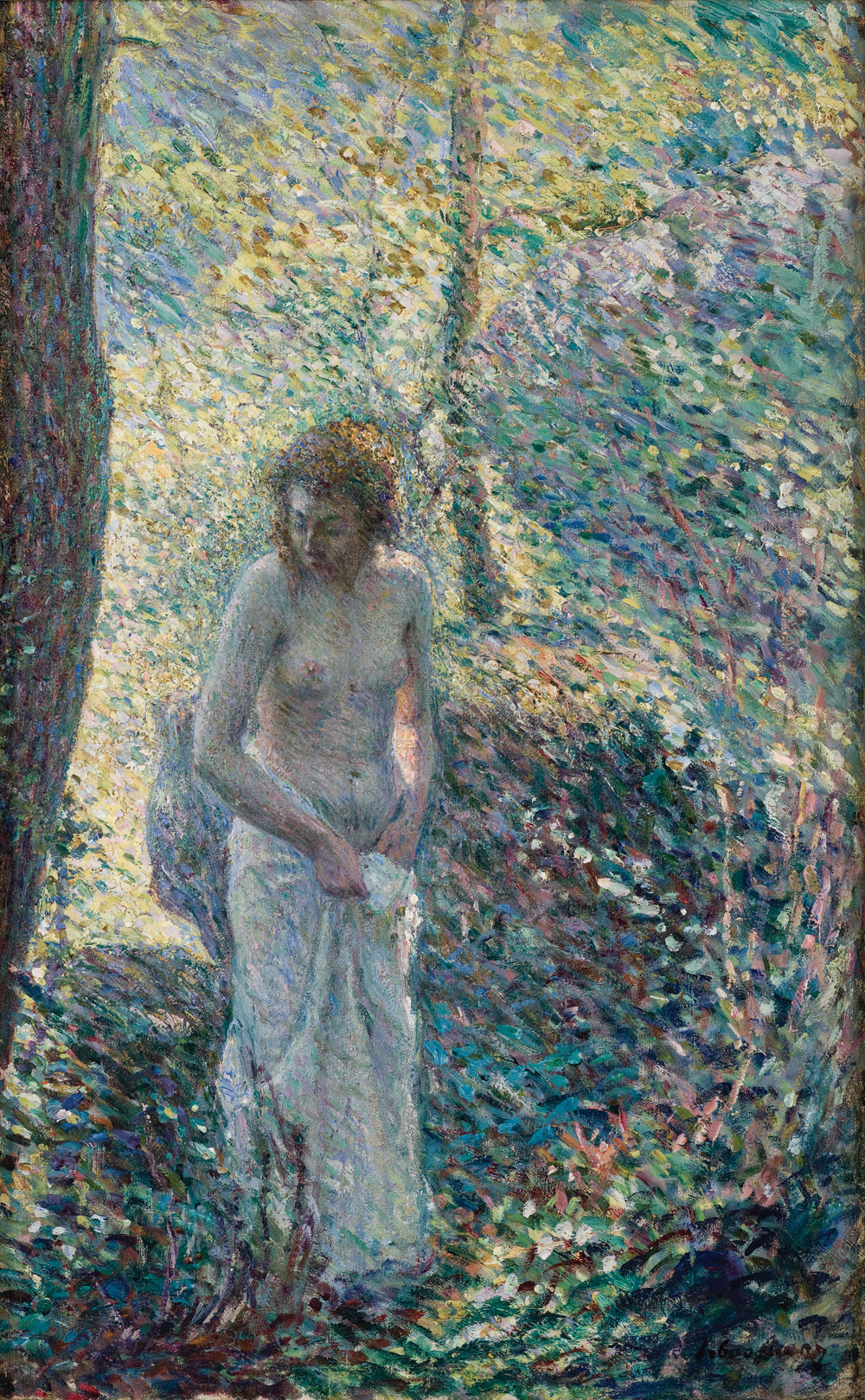
Una joven en el bosque, 1897; Museo de Arte de Ponce

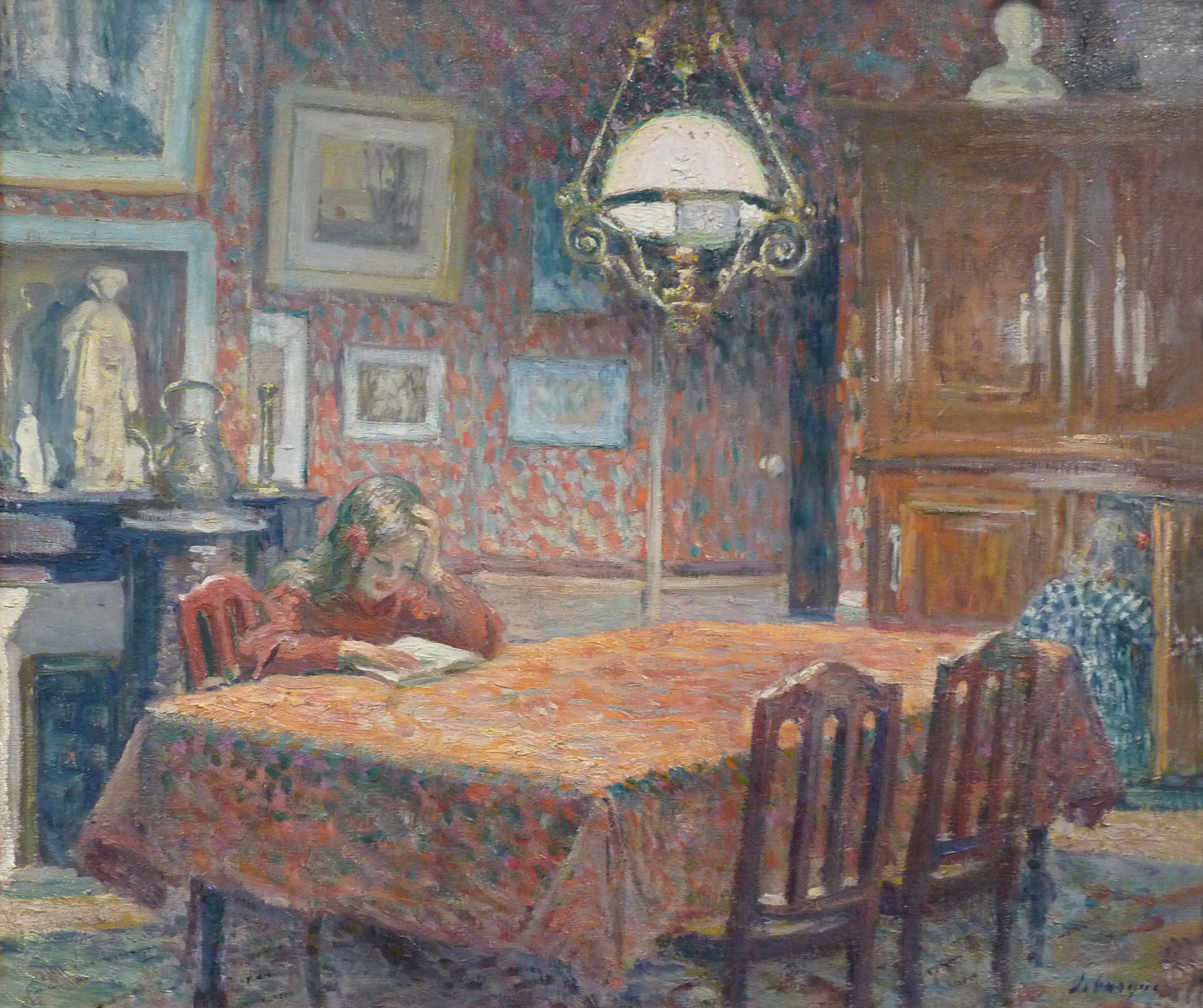
Sous la lampe, 1904; Museum of Fine Arts of Nancy

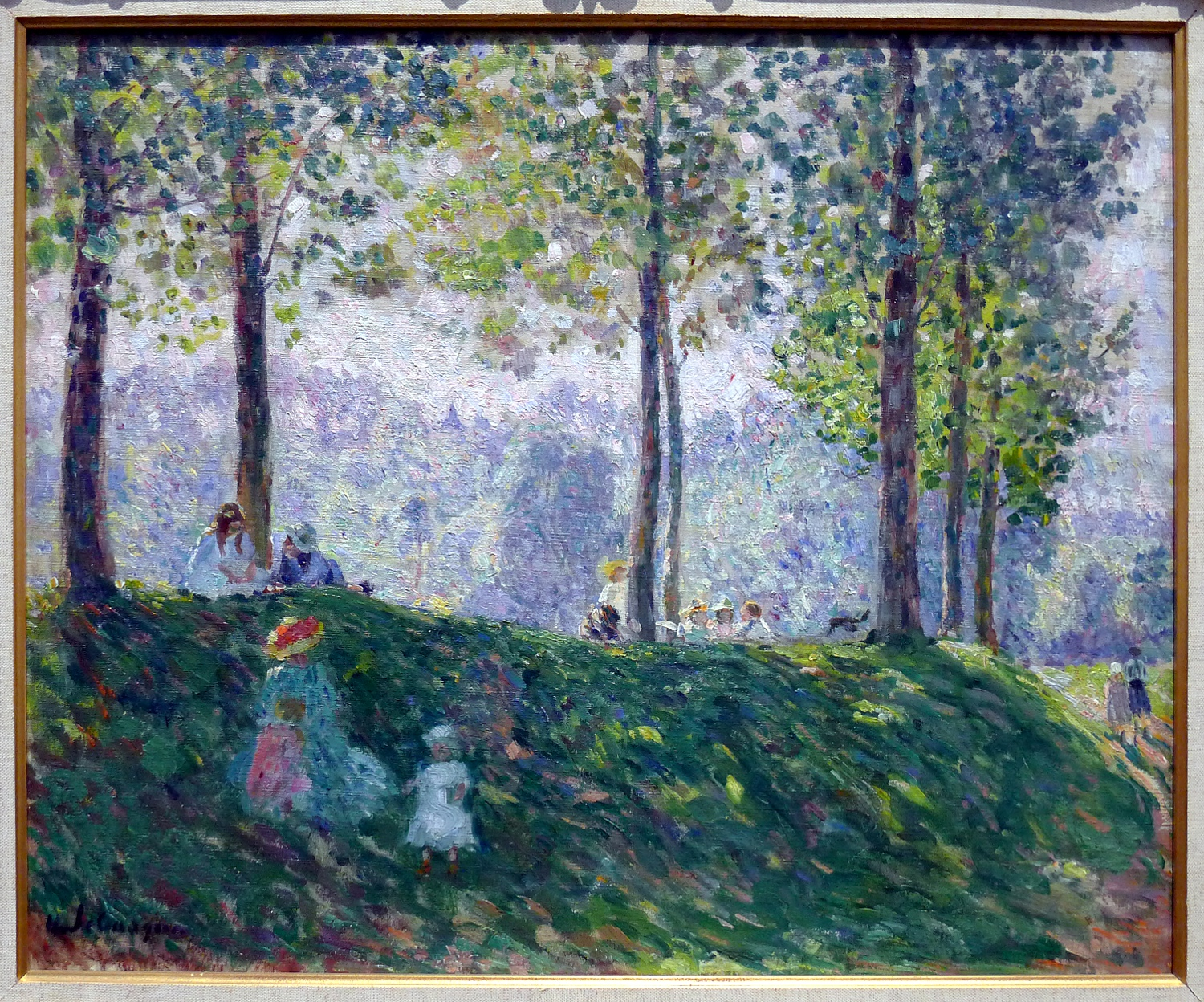
Une après-midi au parc, 1911, Wallraf-Richartz Museum.

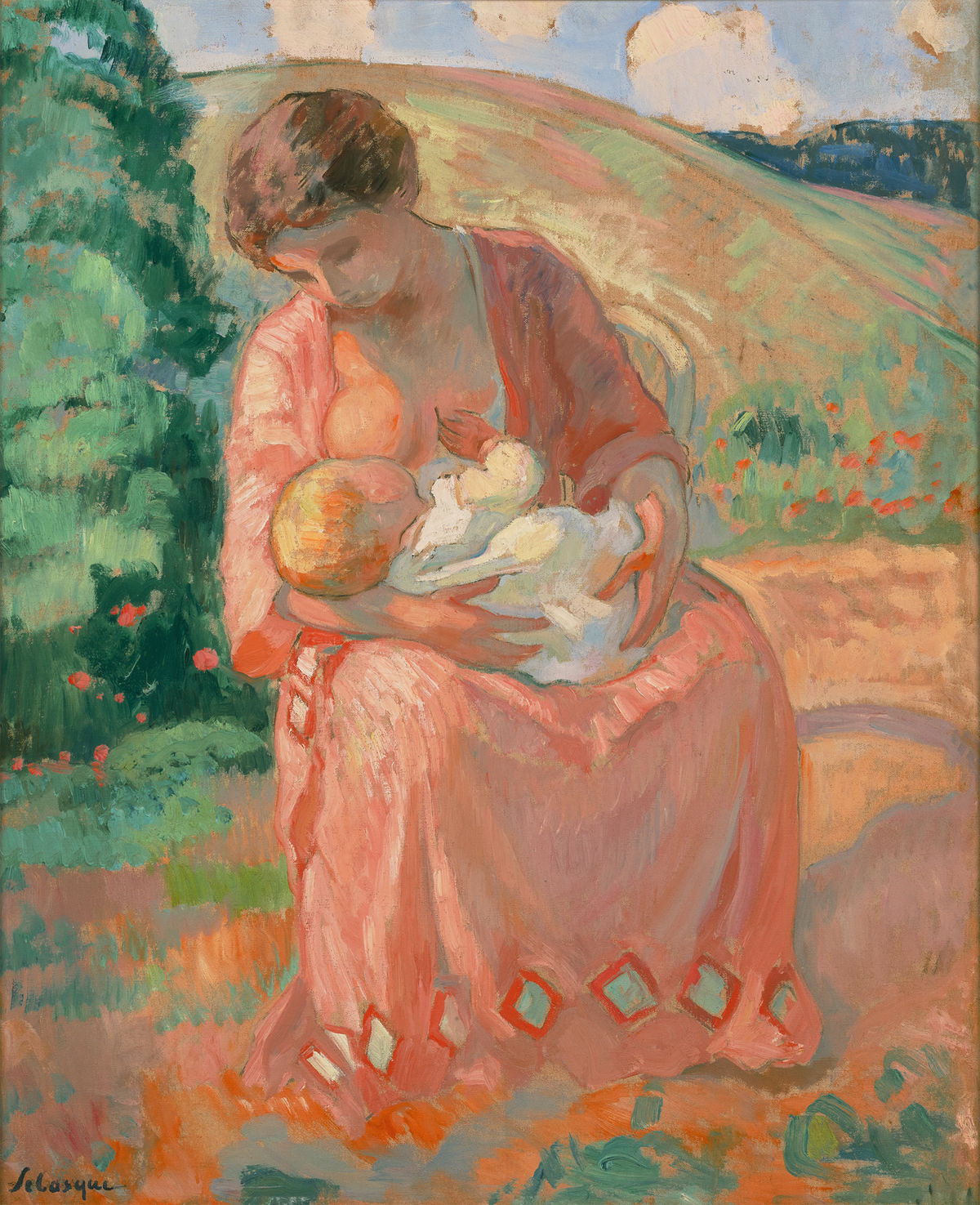
Maternité, 1912; Private collection.

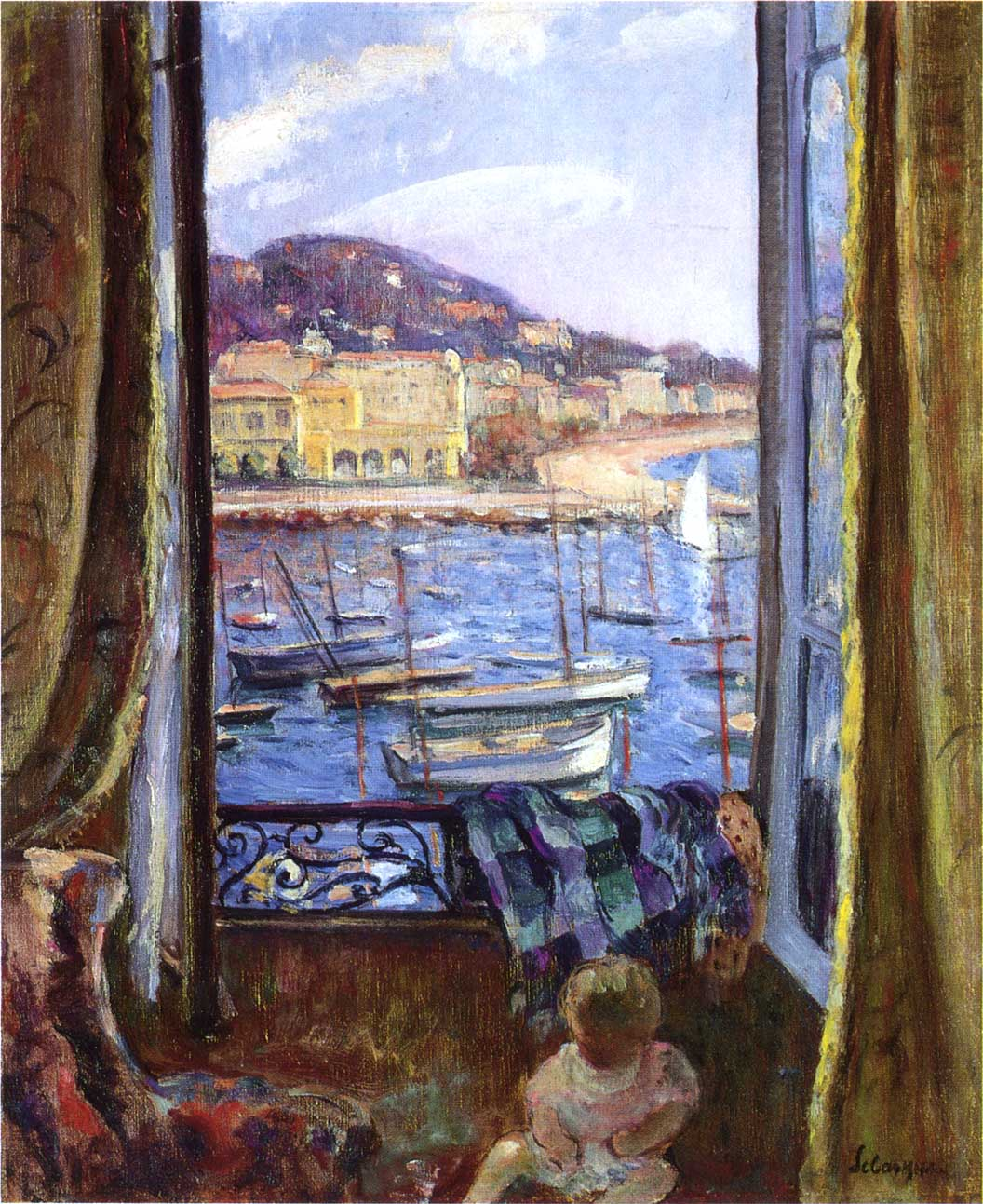
The Quay at St Pierre in Cannes

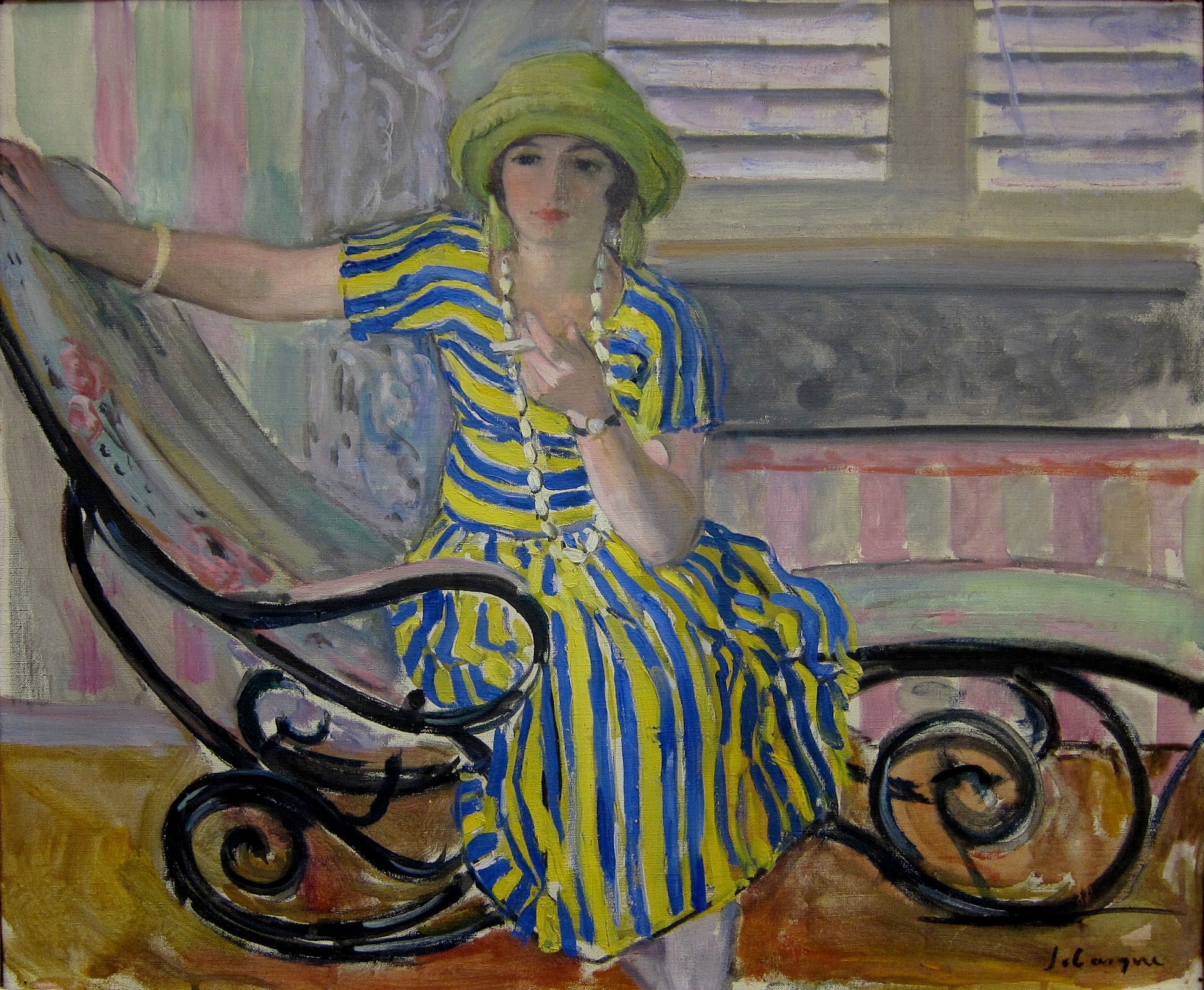
La cigarette, 1921; Musée d'Art et d'Industrie de Roubaix

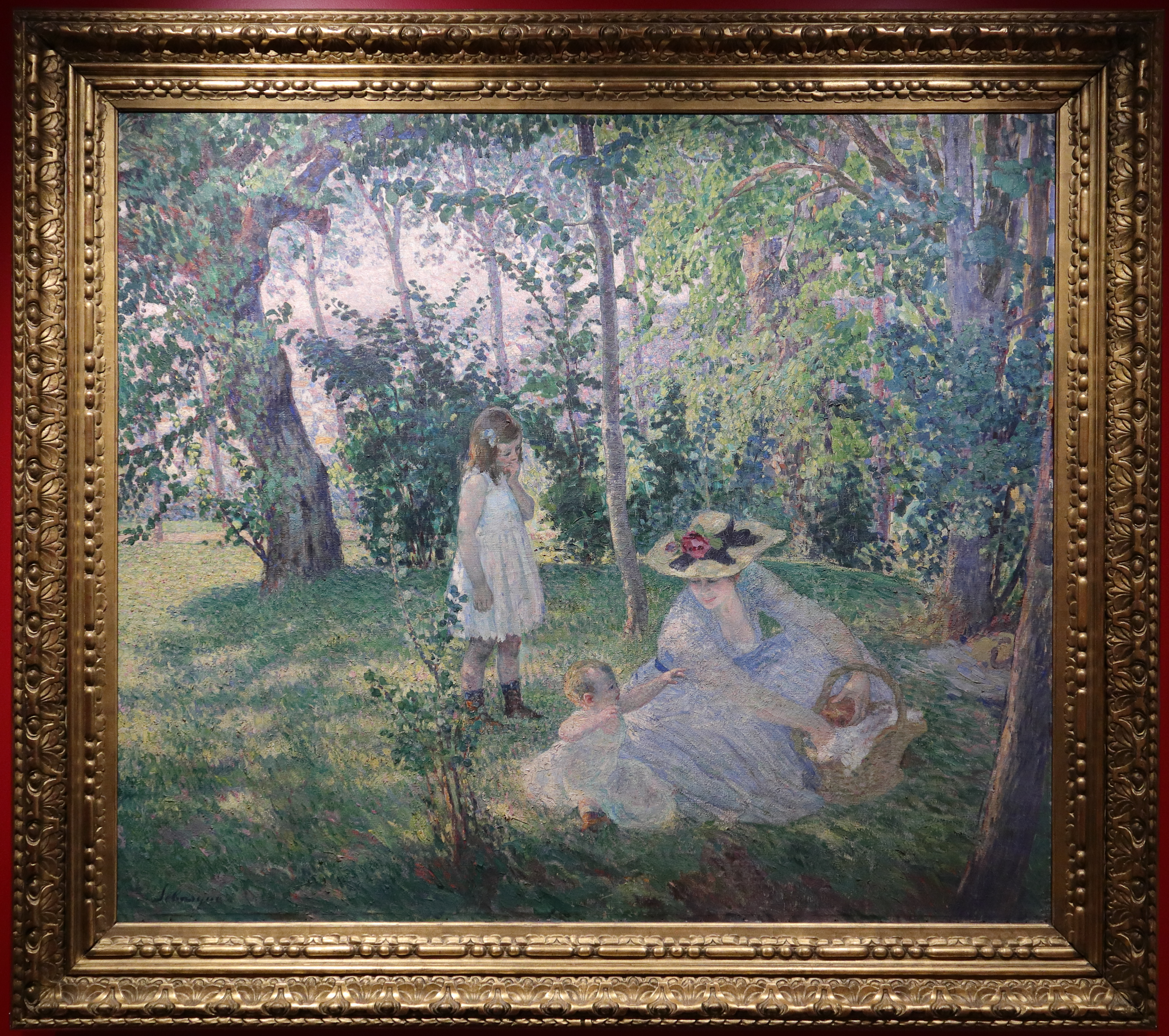
Le Goûter sur l'herbe (Tea on the Grass) (1903), Musée d'arts de Nantes
