= Jean Foyer =

French politician (1921–2008)

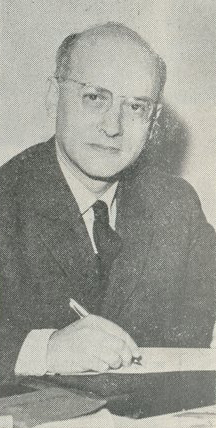

French Minister of Justice
- In office 15 April 1962 – 6 April 1967
- President: Charles de Gaulle
- Prime Minister: Georges Pompidou
- Preceded by: Bernard Chenot
- Succeeded by: Louis Joxe

Personal details
- Born: 21 April 1921 Contigné, France
- Died: 3 October 2008 (aged 87) Paris, France

Jean Foyer (21 April 1921, Contigné, Maine-et-Loire – 3 October 2008, Paris) was a French politician and minister. He studied law and became a law professor at the university. He wrote several books about French Civil law.

== Political career ==
Between 1962 and 1967, he was Minister of Justice, during this time he directed several important legal reforms on several subjects (family, ownership and business, nationality, etc.).

Between 1972 and 1973, he was Minister of Health.

Between 1959 and 1968, he was a member of the Union for the New Republic, then between 1968 and 1978 he was a member of the Union of Democrats for the Republic and finally from 1978 until 1988 he was a member of the Rally for the Republic.

Jean Foyer was known to be an outspoken defender of a very traditional conception of society and sexual morality, and in 1981, he led a fierce fight against the repeal of Article 331(2) of the Penal Code, an article inherited from the Vichy regime which maintained the age of consent for homosexual relations at eighteen years old (whereas it was fifteen years old for heterosexual relations). During the debate on 20 December 1981, he feared that the repeal of this law would favor the "lecherous old man who sodomizes a fifteen-year-old boy". He also asked: "Is the famous freedom that is being expoused just the right of the ogre to devour the little child?".

== Sources ==
- Sur les chemins du droit avec le Général : mémoires de ma vie politique – 1944–1988, with Sabine Jansen, Fayard, Paris, 2006
- Le nouveau Code de procédure civile, with Catherine Puigelier, Economica, Paris, 2006
- France, qu'ont-ils fait de ta liberté ?, François-Xavier de Guibert, Paris, 1999
- La papauté au XXe siècle (Singer-Polignac Foundation), Cerf, Paris 1999
- La Pensée unique : le vrai procès, with Michel Godet, Jean-Pierre Thiollet, Françoise Thom..., Economica—Jean-Marc Chardon & Denis Lensel Ed., Paris, 1998
- Histoire de la justice, Presses universitaires de France, Paris 1996
- La Ve République, Flammarion, Paris, 1995
- Le député dans la société française, Economica, Paris, 1991
- Titre et armes du prince Louis de Bourbon, Diffusion-Université-Culture, Paris; 1990
- Daumier au Palais de Justice, La Colombe, Paris, 1958
- Procédure civile, with Gérard Cornu, Presses universitaires de France, Paris, 1958 (first ed.)
