= François Gernigon =

French politician (born 1961)

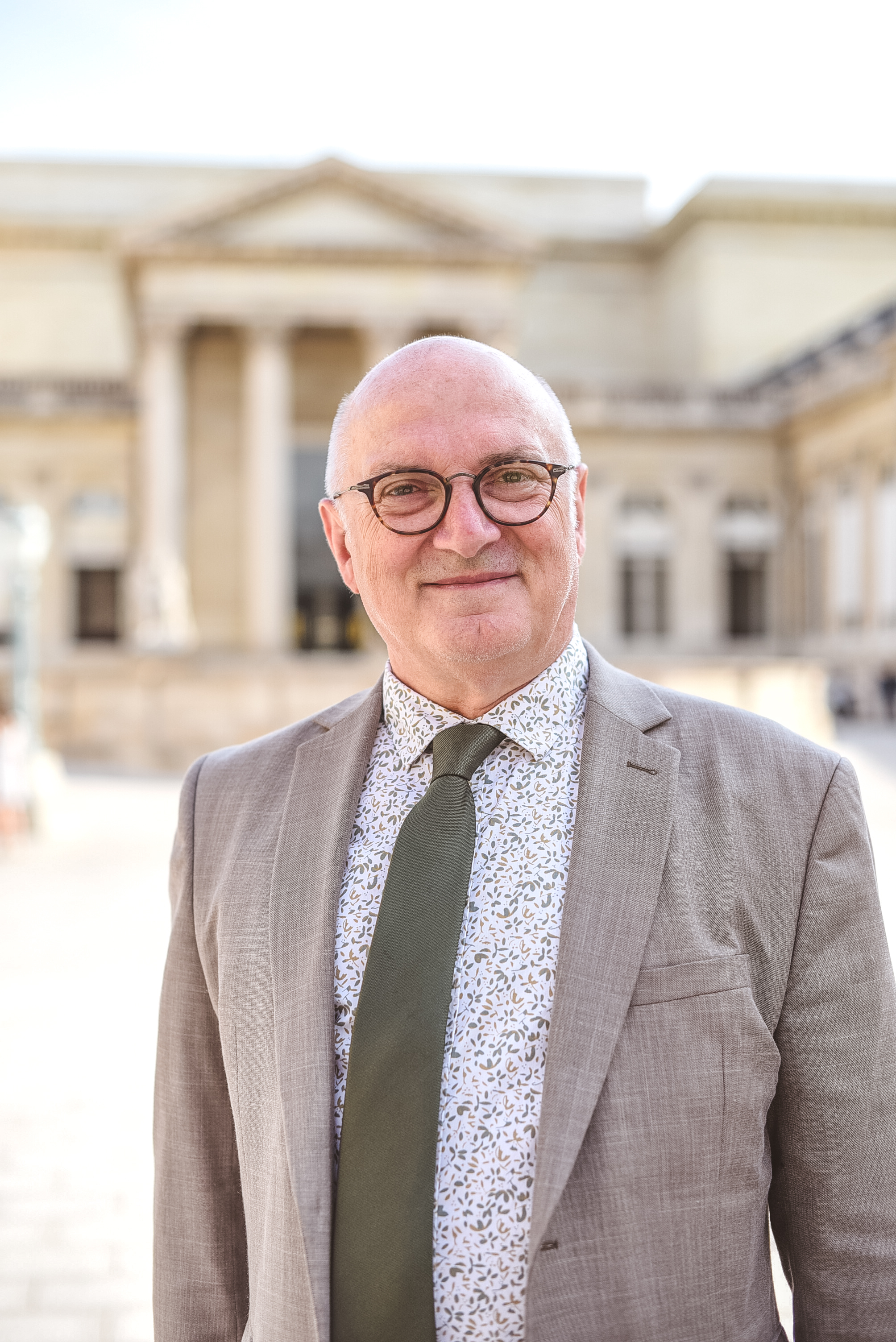
- François Gernigon in 2024

Member of the National Assembly for Maine-et-Loire's 1st constituency
- In office 22 June 2022 – 9 June 2024
- Preceded by: Matthieu Orphelin
- Succeeded by: to be elected

Personal details
- Born: 2 April 1961 (age 64) Angers, France
- Political party: Horizons

François Gernigon (born 2 April 1961) is a French politician. As a member of Horizons, he was elected member of parliament for Maine-et-Loire's 1st constituency in the 2022 French legislative election.

== See also ==
- List of deputies of the 16th National Assembly of France
