= Chenillé-Champteussé =

- Commune
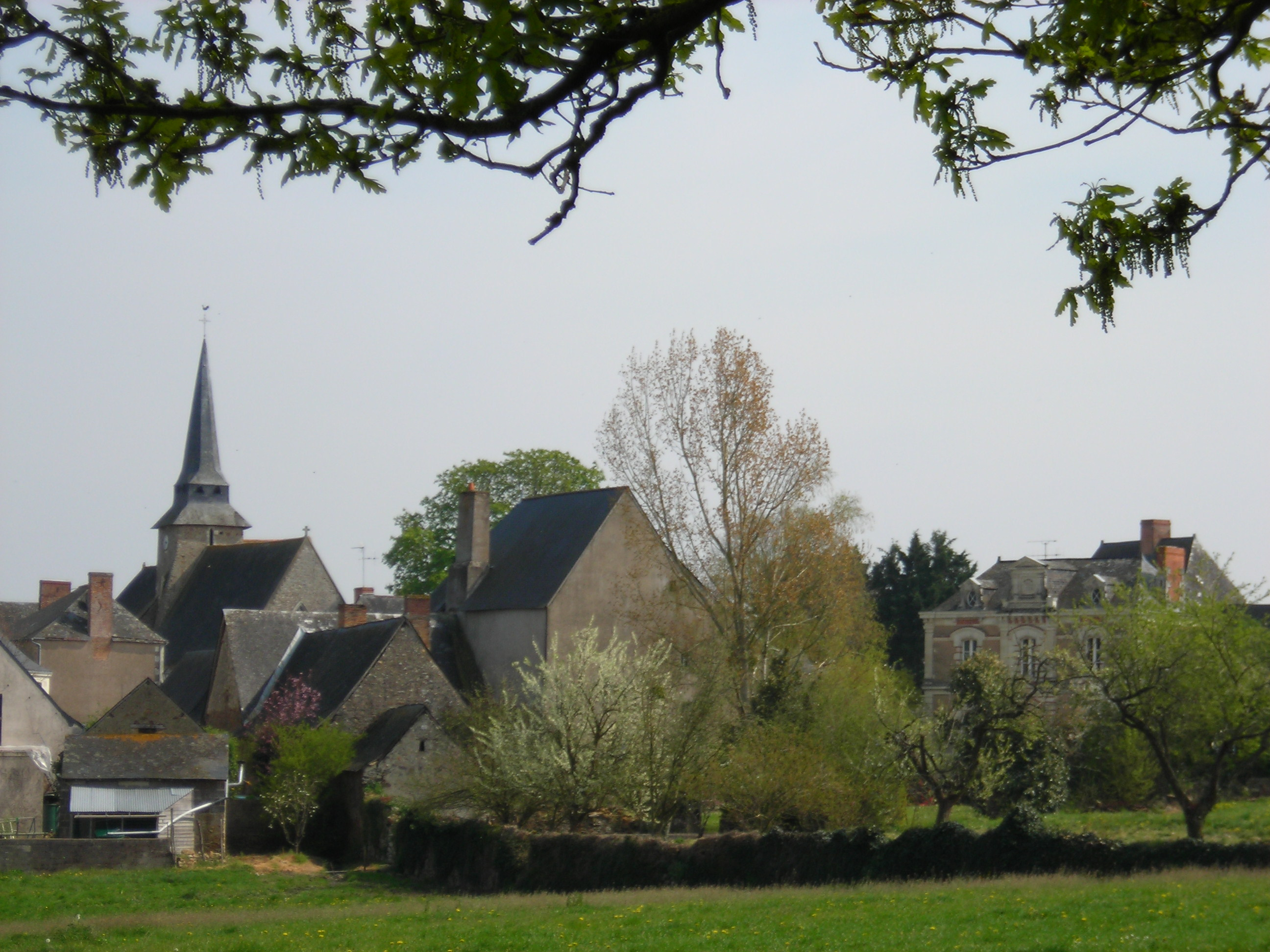
- A general view of Champteussé
- Location of Chenillé-Champteussé
- Location within France Location within Pays de la Loire
- Coordinates: 47°40′01″N 0°39′22″W
- Country: France
- Region: Pays de la Loire
- Department: Maine-et-Loire
- Arrondissement: Segré
- Canton: Tiercé

Government
  - Mayor (2020–2026): Guy Chesneau
- Area^{1}: 16.78 km^{2} (6.48 sq mi)
- Population (2023): 336
  - Density: 20.0/km^{2} (51.9/sq mi)
- Time zone: UTC+01:00 (CET)
  - Summer (DST): UTC+02:00 (CEST)
- INSEE/Postal code: 49067 /49220
- ^{1} French Land Register data, which excludes lakes, ponds, glaciers > 1 km^{2} (0.386 sq mi or 247 acres) and river estuaries.

Chenillé-Champteussé (French pronunciation: [ʃənije ʃɑ̃tøse]) is a commune in the Maine-et-Loire department of western France. The municipality was established on 1 January 2016 and consists of the former communes of Chenillé-Changé and Champteussé-sur-Baconne.

== See also ==
- Communes of the Maine-et-Loire department
