= Matthieu Orphelin =

French politician

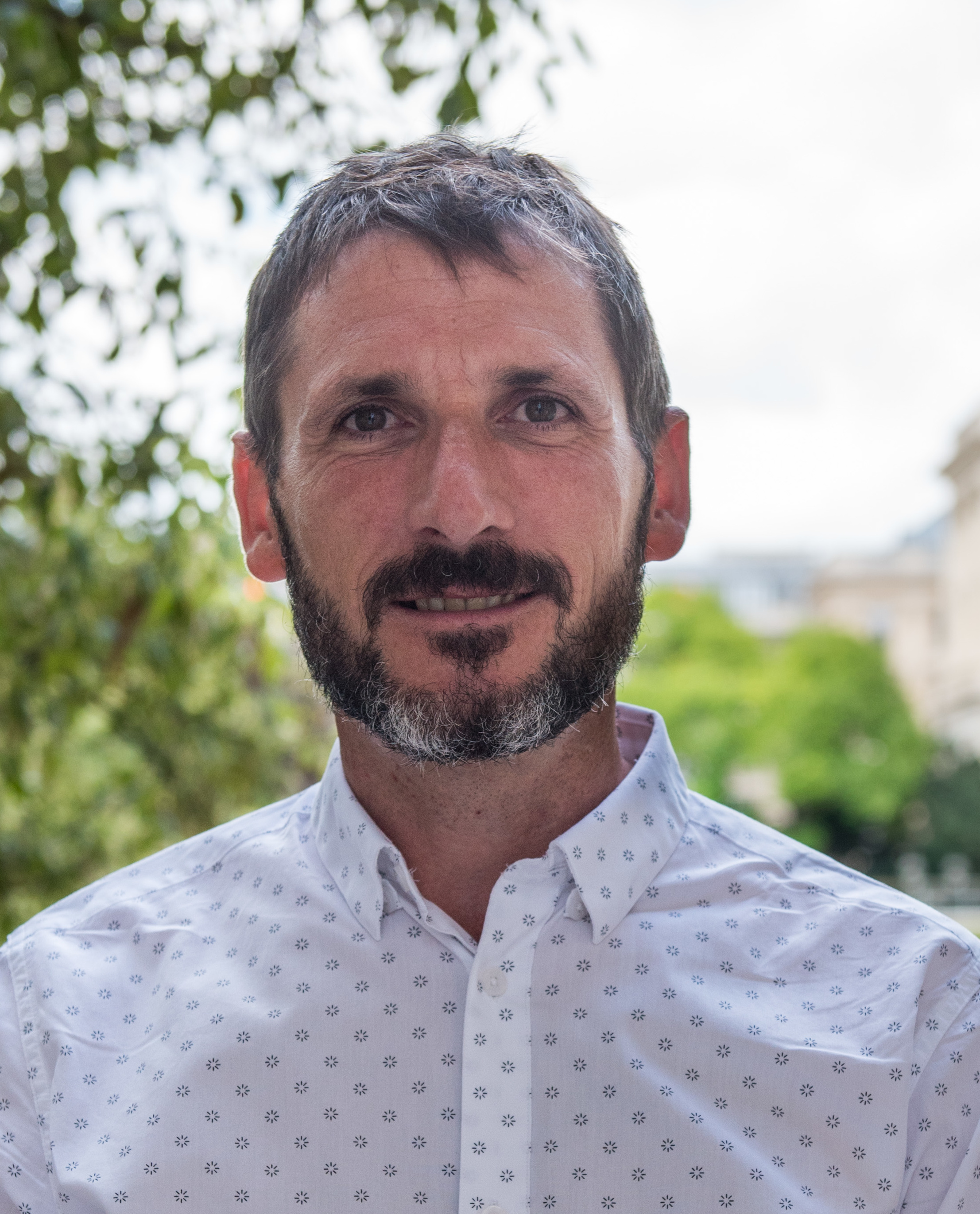
- Matthieu Orphelin in 2017

Member of the National Assembly for Maine-et-Loire's 1st constituency
- In office 20 June 2017 – 21 June 2022
- Preceded by: Luc Belot
- Succeeded by: François Gernigon

Vice-President of the Regional Council of Pays de la Loire
- In office 2010–2015
- President: Jacques Auxiette

Personal details
- Born: 3 December 1972 (age 53) Saint-Nazaire, France
- Party: La République En Marche!
- Education: École Centrale de Nantes
- Profession: Engineer

Matthieu Orphelin (French pronunciation: [matjø ɔʁfəlɛ̃]; born 3 December 1972) is a French politician who served as a member of the French National Assembly from 2017 to 2022, representing Maine-et-Loire.

== Early life and education ==
Orphelin is an engineer at the École centrale de Nantes, an environmental specialty, and a doctor of energy at the École des Mines de Paris. He is a specialist in energy policies and the fight against climate change and has also been involved in politics, where he is particularly involved in education, training and solidarity issues.

Orphelin spent most of his career at the Environment and Energy Management Agency (ADEME), where he was chief of the economy, evaluation and observation department and then director of research and development. prospective. He also acted as adviser to Michèle Pappalardo, then as chief of staff to Chantal Jouanno and Philippe Van de Maele.

From 2007 to 2010, Orphelin was part of the representatives of the State College in the groups of Grenelle de l'environnement and works in particular on the building plan and on the tax measures whose contribution energy climate. He also led work on energy poverty, the ecological transformation of the economy and training for the jobs of tomorrow.

== Political career ==
Top of Europe Ecology – The Greens for the 2010 regional elections in Maine-et-Loire, he is elected and appointed Vice President of the Regional council of Pays de la Loire, Chairman of the Education and Learning Commission.

During the 2011 Ecology Party presidential primary, for a presidential election 2012, he worked in Nicolas Hulot's campaign team.

=== Member of the National Assembly ===
Orphelin was elected to the French National Assembly on 18 June 2017, representing the 1st constituency of Maine-et-Loire.

In the National Assembly, Orphelin served on the Committee on Sustainable Development, Spatial and Regional Planning. He was also a member of Joint information mission on plant protection products. In addition to his committee assignments, he chaired the France-Vanuatu Friendship Group and served as secretary of the France-India Friendship Group.

In September 2018, Orphelin supported Barbara Pompili's candidacy for the presidency of the National Assembly. The following month, he launched a collective called "Accelerating the Ecological and Solidarity Transition!", which brought together more than 120 MPs from six of the seven parliamentary groups of the Assembly. Led by Orphelin, Aurélien Taché and Hugues Renson, a group of around 20 members of the LREM parliamentary group was established in late 2018 with a "wish to express a humanist, social and ecological sensibility and to better raise citizens' concerns"; the initiative was widely interpreted as the launch of a left-wing faction within the group.

Orphelin left the La République en marche group on 6 February 2019, explaining having "done everything possible [...] to carry high the ecology", without success, invoking in particular insufficient progress on the "climatic, ecological and criticizing "certain choices" of the government. He is close to the former Minister of Ecological and Solidary Transition Nicolas Hulot, who resigned in 2018 for the same reasons.

In May 2020 he became one of the two initial presidents of the Ecology Democracy Solidarity National Assembly group, which was mainly made up of defectors from LREM.

== Political positions ==
Ahead of the 2020 Paris municipal election, Orphelin endorsed Cédric Villani as candidate for mayor.

In July 2019, Orphelin voted against the French ratification of the European Union’s Comprehensive Economic and Trade Agreement (CETA) with Canada. Amid the COVID-19 pandemic in France, Orphelin backed a public petition calling on consumers to “not buy any gifts” from Amazon for the holidays in 2020.

Ahead of the Green movement's primaries in 2021, Orphelin endorsed Yannick Jadot as the movement's candidate for the French presidential election in 2022.

== See also ==
- 2017 French legislative election
