= François Bachelot =

French physician and politician (1940–2019)

Member of the National Assembly for Seine-Saint-Denis
- In office 2 April 1986 – 14 May 1988

Personal details
- Born: 19 April 1940 Le Mans, France
- Died: 14 June 2019 (aged 79) Saint-Cloud, France
- Party: National Front
- Spouse: Yann Piat
- Relatives: Roselyne Bachelot (sister-in-law)

François Bachelot (French pronunciation: [fʁɑ̃swa baʃlo]; April 19, 1940, in Le Mans – June 14, 2019, in Saint-Cloud) was a French physician and politician.

== Early life ==
François Bachelot was born on 19 April 1940 in Le Mans, in northern France.

== Career ==
=== Medical career ===
Bachelot began his career as a physician. He ran a cancer clinic in La Garenne-Colombes, a suburb of Paris in the Hauts-de-Seine. He practiced at the Saint-Cloud cancer center. He served as secretary-general of the Permanent Assembly of the chambers of liberal professions, between 1977 and 1983, before serving as president of the chamber of liberal professions of Hauts-de-Seine.

=== Political career ===
Bachelot first joined the RPR and in 1981, participated in the foundation of Solidarity and Defense of Freedoms (SDL), a movement resulting from the Civic Action Service, a counter to the Initiative and Freedom Movement (MIL), which included Alain Juppé, Jacques Toubon, Yvon Bourges and Jacques Médecin for the RPR, Alice Saunier-Seité and Jacques Dominati for the UDF, as well as other members of these parties from the far-right, who would go on to join the National Front.

Like many other economic and political notables (Bruno Chauvierre, Pascal Arrighi, Charles de Chambrun, Michel de Rostolan, Olivier d'Ormesson, Jean Roussel, Jacques Vaysse-Tempé, Pierre Descaves, Guy Le Jaouen), François Bachelot joined the National Front in the mid-1980s, and led the far-right list to the legislative elections of March 1986 in Seine-Saint-Denis, which obtained 14.52% of the vote and two deputies. He served as a member of the National Assembly from 1986 to 1988.

At the beginning of November 1987, François Bachelot replaced Olivier d'Ormesson - who resigned following Jean-Marie Le Pen's controversial gas chamber remarks - at the FN political office, allowing Bachelot to become secretary general of the party of the National Front.

During the presidential elections of 1988, he led the campaign of Jean-Marie Le Pen in Paris. During the legislative elections in June, he presented himself in the constituency of Aulnay-sous-Bois and obtained 16.6% of the votes cast in the first round, a high result for an FN candidate but insufficient to make it to the second round.

An ally of Jean-Marie Le Pen, he came up with the idea of sending patients with HIV/AIDS to "sidatoriums" to curtail a "generalised epidemic," which was widely repeated by Le Pen. He also suggested AIDS could be spread via perspiration and saliva. In a 1999 interview, he suggested all of this was what physicians believed at the time.
