= Les Hauts-d'Anjou =

- Commune
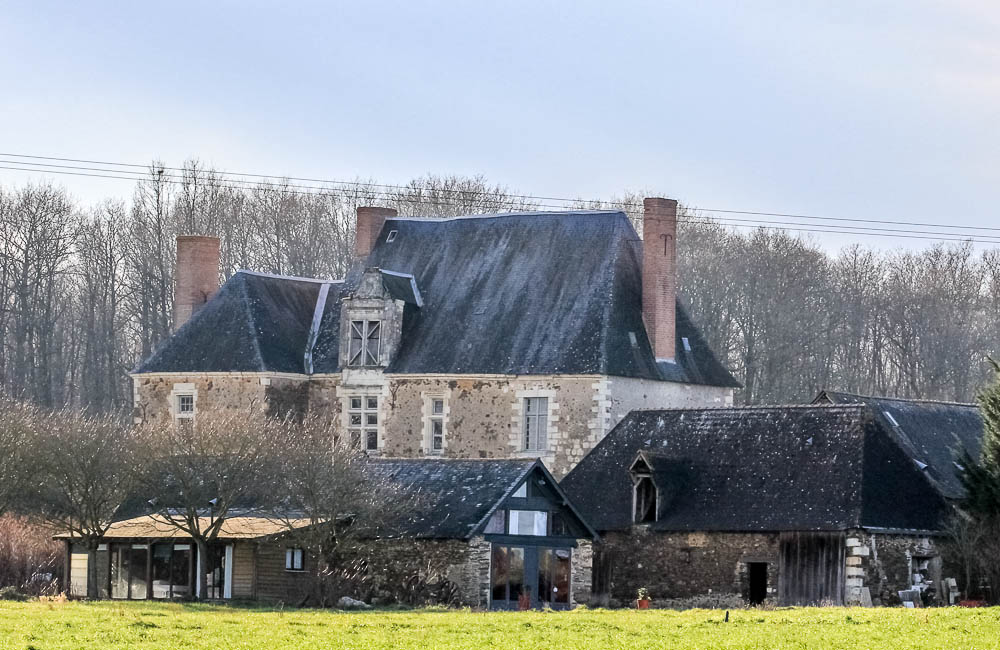
- Manoir de la Maldemeure in Champigné
- Location of Les Hauts-d'Anjou
- Location within France Location within Pays de la Loire
- Coordinates: 47°39′54″N 0°34′16″W
- Country: France
- Region: Pays de la Loire
- Department: Maine-et-Loire
- Arrondissement: Segré
- Canton: Tiercé
- Intercommunality: Vallées du Haut-Anjou
- Area^{1}: 143.36 km^{2} (55.35 sq mi)
- Population (2023): 8,751
  - Density: 61.04/km^{2} (158.1/sq mi)
- Time zone: UTC+01:00 (CET)
  - Summer (DST): UTC+02:00 (CEST)
- INSEE/Postal code: 49080 /49330
- ^{1} French Land Register data, which excludes lakes, ponds, glaciers > 1 km^{2} (0.386 sq mi or 247 acres) and river estuaries.

Les Hauts-d'Anjou (French pronunciation: [le o dɑ̃ʒu], literally The Heights of Anjou) is a commune in the Maine-et-Loire department of western France. The municipality was established on 15 December 2016 by merger of the former communes of Brissarthe, Contigné, Cherré, Champigné, Marigné, Sœurdres and Querré. On 1 January 2019, the former commune Châteauneuf-sur-Sarthe was merged into Les Hauts-d'Anjou.

== Population ==
The population data given in the table below refer to the commune in its geography as of January 2025.

Historical population
Year	Pop.	±% p.a.
1968	5,810	—
1975	6,013	+0.49%
1982	6,675	+1.50%
1990	6,355	−0.61%
1999	6,439	+0.15%
2007	7,864	+2.53%
2012	8,496	+1.56%
2017	8,759	+0.61%
2023	8,751	−0.02%
Source: INSEE

== See also ==
- Communes of the Maine-et-Loire department
