= Sœurdres =

- Part of Les Hauts-d'Anjou
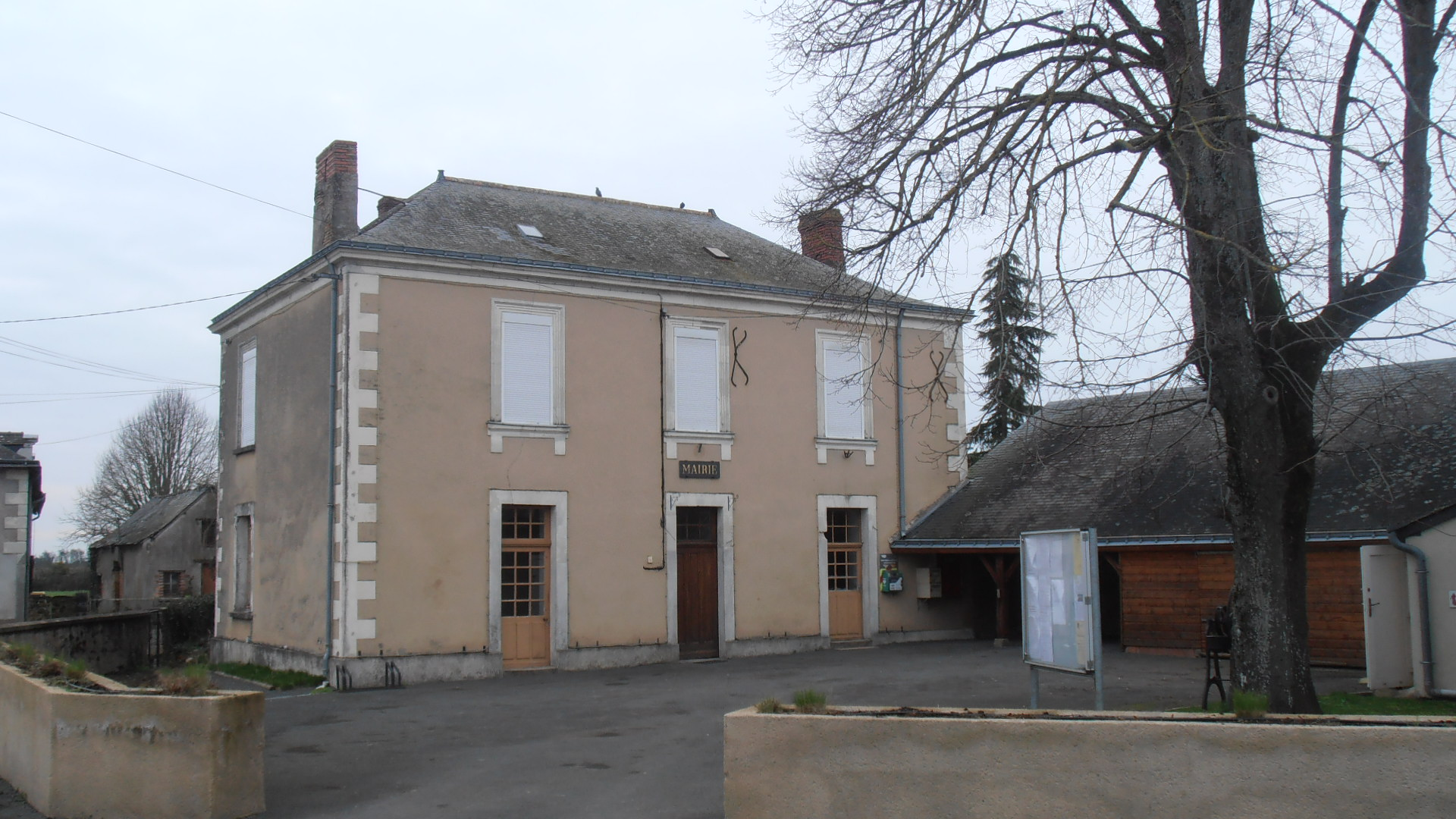
- Location of Sœurdres
- Location within France Location within Pays de la Loire
- Coordinates: 47°44′20″N 0°34′23″W
- Country: France
- Region: Pays de la Loire
- Department: Maine-et-Loire
- Arrondissement: Segré
- Canton: Tiercé
- Commune: Les Hauts-d'Anjou
- Area^{1}: 15.24 km^{2} (5.88 sq mi)
- Elevation: 65 m (213 ft)
- Highest elevation: 79 m (259 ft)
- Lowest elevation: 39 m (128 ft)
- Population (2022): 373
  - Density: 24.5/km^{2} (63.4/sq mi)
- Demonym(s): Soeurdréen, Soeurdréenne
- Time zone: UTC+01:00 (CET)
  - Summer (DST): UTC+02:00 (CEST)
- Postal code: 49330
- ^{1} French Land Register data, which excludes lakes, ponds, glaciers > 1 km^{2} (0.386 sq mi or 247 acres) and river estuaries.

Sœurdres (French pronunciation: [sœʁdʁ]) is a former commune in the Maine-et-Loire department in western France. On 15 December 2016, it was merged into the new commune Les Hauts-d'Anjou.

== See also ==
- Communes of the Maine-et-Loire department
