= Guy Le Jaouen =

French politician

- Born: 30 August 1933; Le Creusot, Saône-et-Loire, Burgundy, France
- Died: 3 December 2014 (aged 81)
- Occupation: Politician

Guy Le Jaouen (1933–2014) was a French politician.

== Early life ==
Guy Le Jaouen was born on 30 August 1933 in Le Creusot.

== Career ==
He joined the National Front, and served as a member of the National Assembly from 1986 to 1988, representing Loire. In 1988, however, he left the National Front and joined the Rally for the Republic party (RPR).

== Death ==
He died on 3 December 2014.
