= Paul Jeanneteau =

French politician

Paul Jeanneteau (born October 14, 1957 in Angers) is a member of the National Assembly of France. He represents the Maine-et-Loire department, and is a member of the Union for a Popular Movement.
