= Brissarthe =

- Part of Les Hauts-d'Anjou
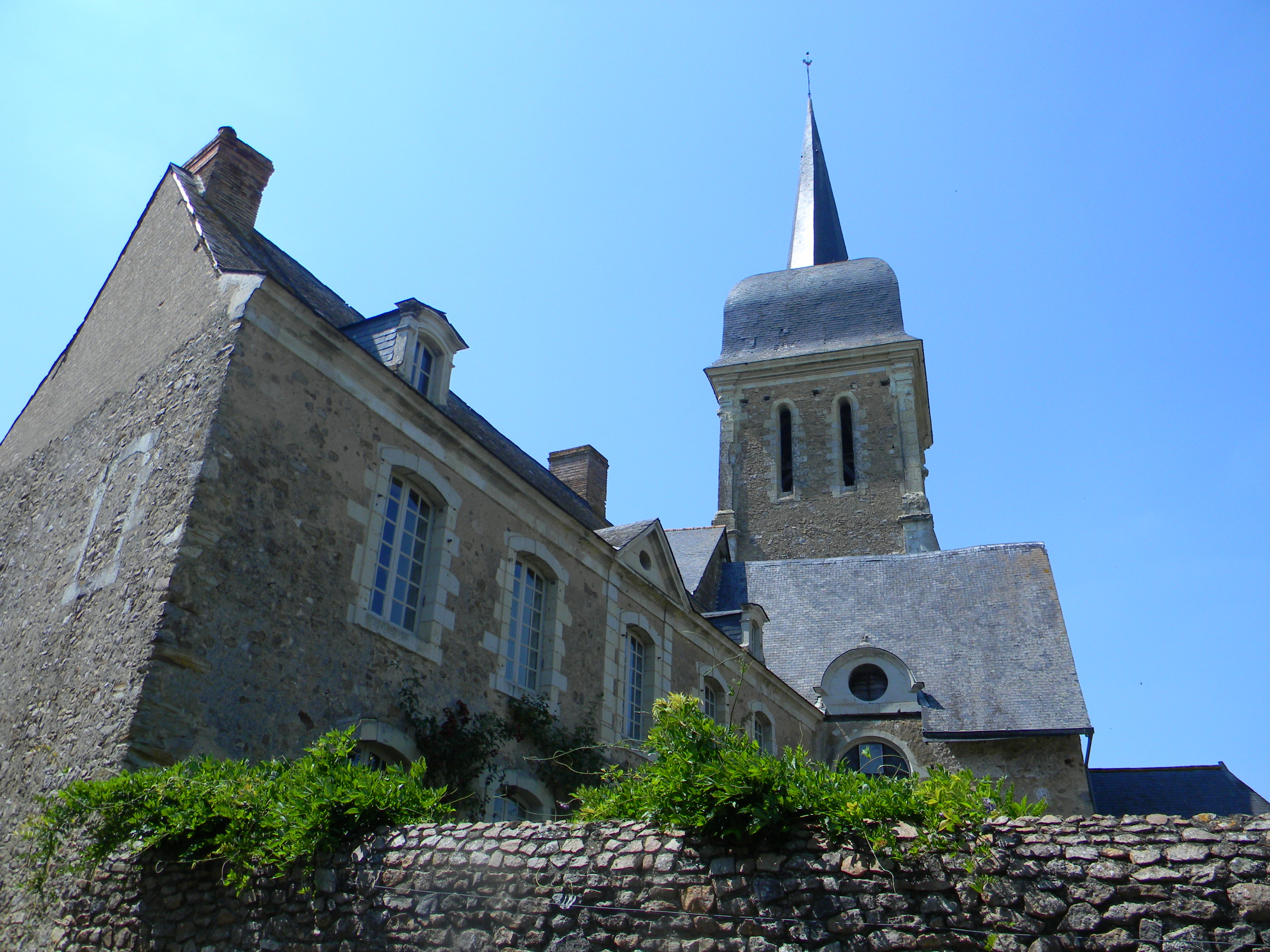
- The church in Brissarthe
- Location of Brissarthe
- Location within France Location within Pays de la Loire
- Coordinates: 47°42′06″N 0°26′57″W
- Country: France
- Region: Pays de la Loire
- Department: Maine-et-Loire
- Arrondissement: Segré
- Canton: Tiercé
- Commune: Les Hauts-d'Anjou
- Area^{1}: 16.99 km^{2} (6.56 sq mi)
- Elevation: 23 m (75 ft)
- Highest elevation: 78 m (256 ft)
- Lowest elevation: 17 m (56 ft)
- Population (2023): 623
  - Density: 36.7/km^{2} (95.0/sq mi)
- Time zone: UTC+01:00 (CET)
  - Summer (DST): UTC+02:00 (CEST)
- Postal code: 49330
- ^{1} French Land Register data, which excludes lakes, ponds, glaciers > 1 km^{2} (0.386 sq mi or 247 acres) and river estuaries.

Brissarthe (French pronunciation: [bʁisaʁt]) is a former commune in the Maine-et-Loire department in western France. On 15 December 2016, it was merged into the new commune Les Hauts-d'Anjou.

== See also ==
- Communes of the Maine-et-Loire department
