= Champteussé-sur-Baconne =

- Part of Chenillé-Champteussé
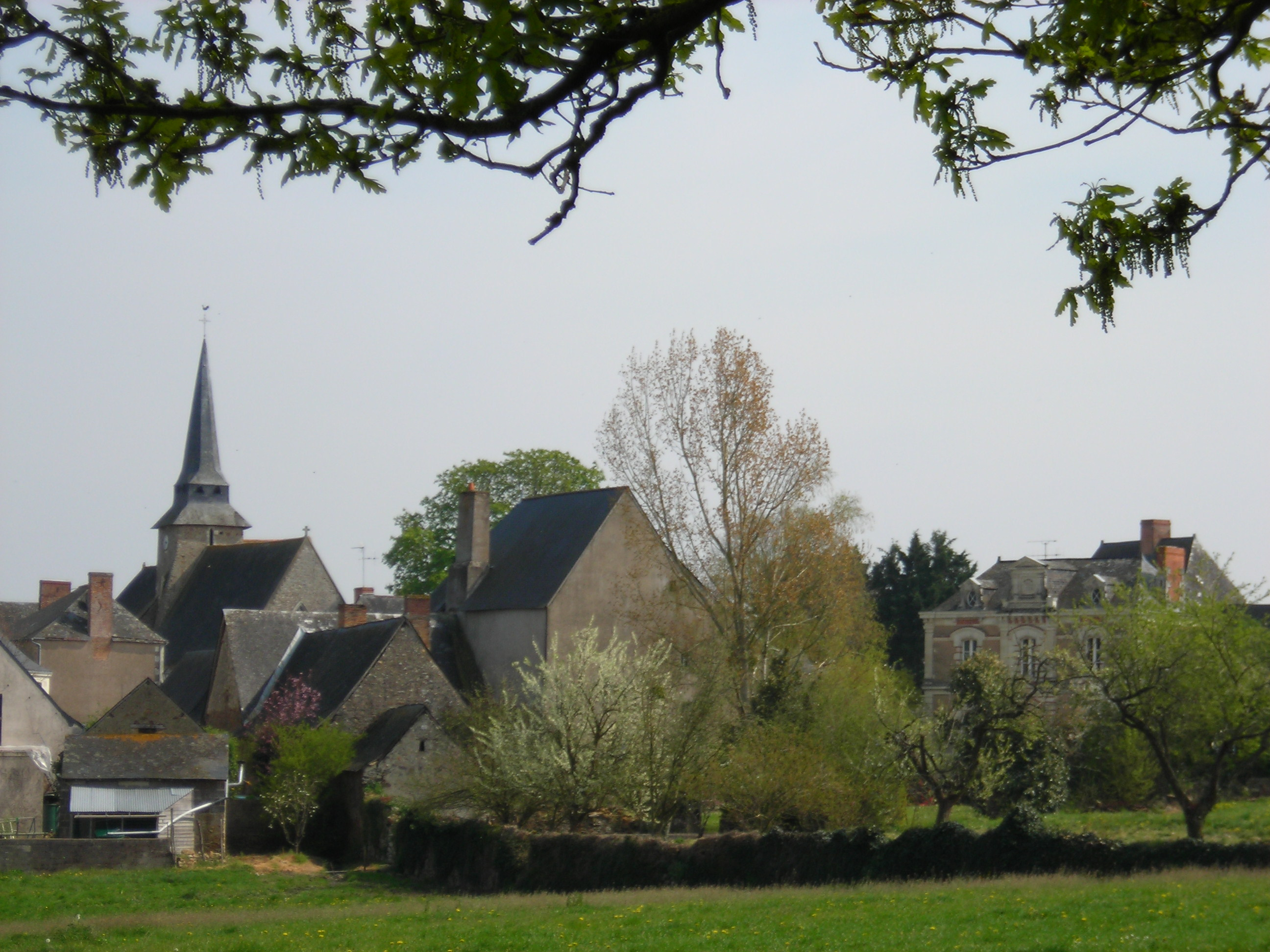

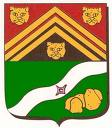
- Coat of arms
- Location of Champteussé-sur-Baconne
- Location within France Location within Pays de la Loire
- Coordinates: 47°40′07″N 0°39′14″W
- Country: France
- Region: Pays de la Loire
- Department: Maine-et-Loire
- Arrondissement: Segré
- Canton: Tiercé
- Commune: Chenillé-Champteussé
- Area^{1}: 11.48 km^{2} (4.43 sq mi)
- Elevation: 27 m (89 ft)
- Highest elevation: 77 m (253 ft)
- Lowest elevation: 24 m (79 ft)
- Population (2022): 207
  - Density: 18.0/km^{2} (46.7/sq mi)
- Demonym(s): Champteusséen, Champteusséenne
- Time zone: UTC+01:00 (CET)
  - Summer (DST): UTC+02:00 (CEST)
- Postal code: 49220
- ^{1} French Land Register data, which excludes lakes, ponds, glaciers > 1 km^{2} (0.386 sq mi or 247 acres) and river estuaries.

Champteussé-sur-Baconne (French pronunciation: [ʃɑ̃tøse syʁ bakɔn], before 1962: Champteussé) is a former commune in the Maine-et-Loire department of western France. On 1 January 2016, it was merged into the new commune of Chenillé-Champteussé.

== See also ==
- Communes of the Maine-et-Loire department
