= Marigné =

- Part of Les Hauts-d'Anjou
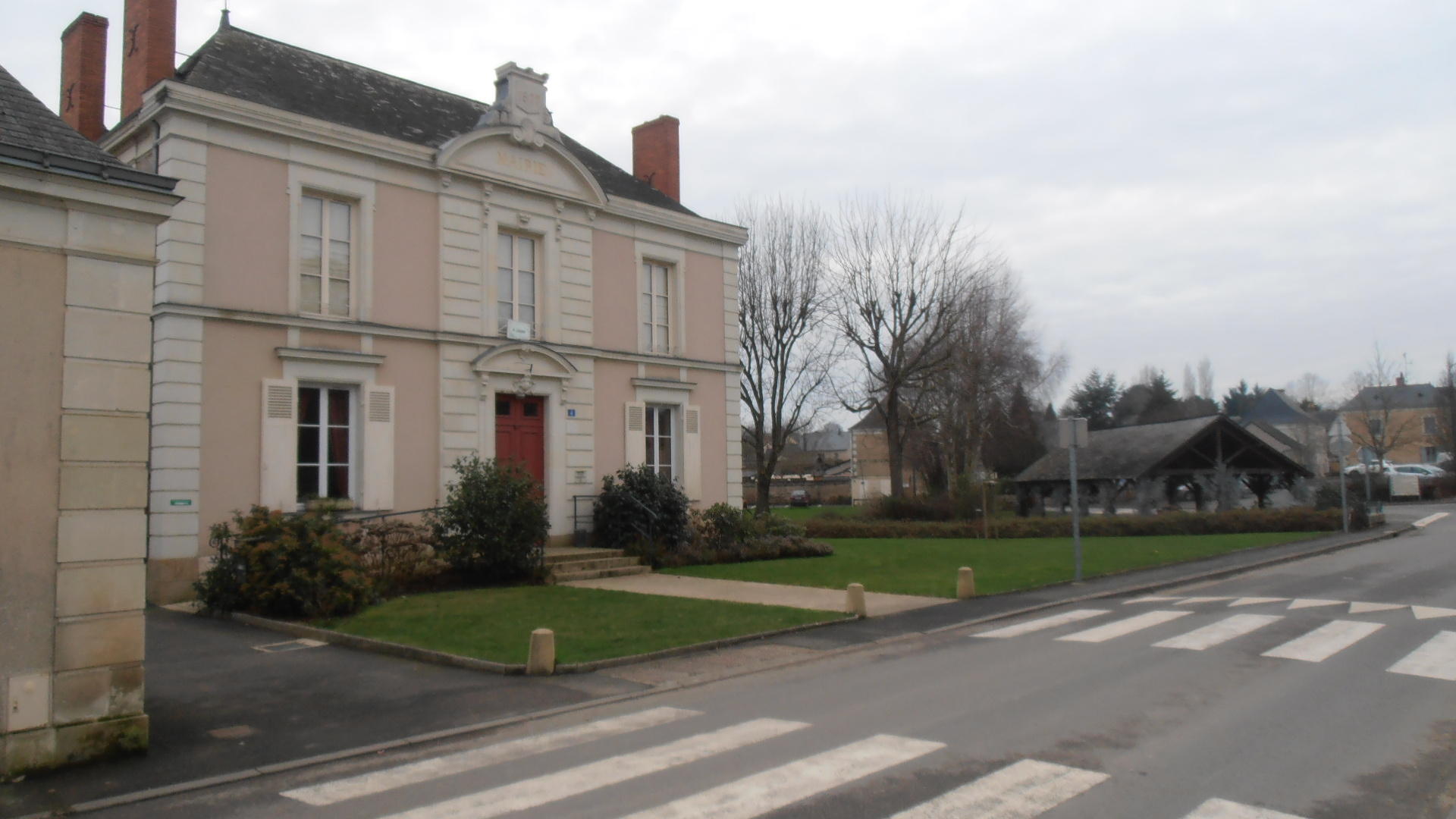
- Town hall
- Location of Marigné
- Location within France Location within Pays de la Loire
- Coordinates: 47°43′24″N 0°37′04″W
- Country: France
- Region: Pays de la Loire
- Department: Maine-et-Loire
- Arrondissement: Segré
- Canton: Tiercé
- Commune: Les Hauts-d'Anjou
- Area^{1}: 24.41 km^{2} (9.42 sq mi)
- Elevation: 55 m (180 ft)
- Highest elevation: 83 m (272 ft)
- Lowest elevation: 20 m (66 ft)
- Population (2022): 697
  - Density: 28.6/km^{2} (74.0/sq mi)
- Demonym(s): Marignéen, Marignéenne
- Time zone: UTC+01:00 (CET)
  - Summer (DST): UTC+02:00 (CEST)
- Postal code: 49330
- ^{1} French Land Register data, which excludes lakes, ponds, glaciers > 1 km^{2} (0.386 sq mi or 247 acres) and river estuaries.

Marigné (French pronunciation: [maʁiɲe]) is a former commune in the Maine-et-Loire department in western France. On 15 December 2016, it was merged into the new commune Les Hauts-d'Anjou.

== See also ==
- Communes of the Maine-et-Loire department
