= Roselyne Bachelot =

French politician (born 1946)

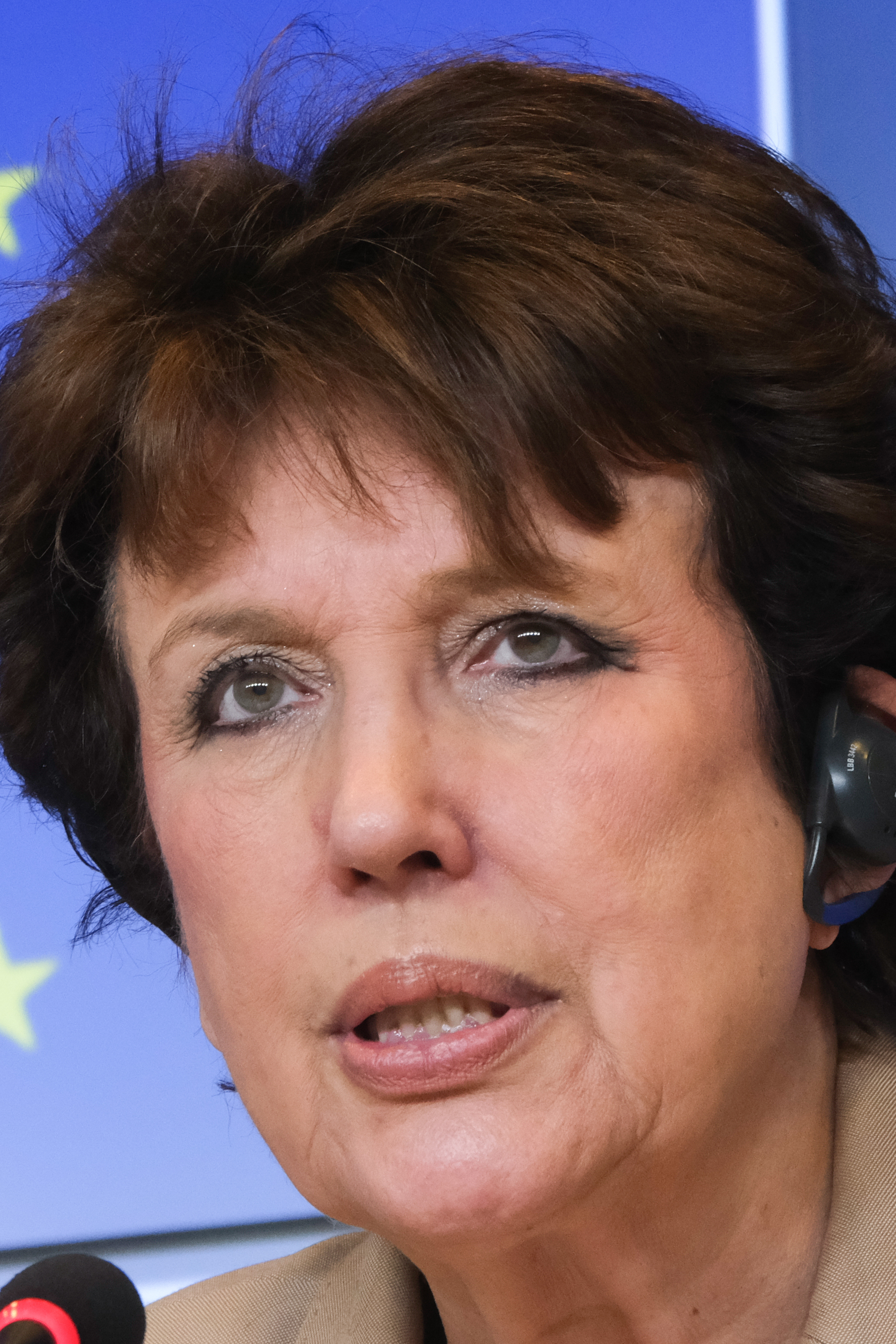
- Bachelot in 2022

Minister of Culture
- In office 6 July 2020 – 20 May 2022
- President: Emmanuel Macron
- Prime Minister: Jean Castex
- Preceded by: Franck Riester
- Succeeded by: Rima Abdul Malak

Minister of Solidarity and Social Cohesion
- In office 14 November 2010 – 16 May 2012
- President: Nicolas Sarkozy
- Prime Minister: François Fillon
- Preceded by: Eric Woerth
- Succeeded by: Marisol Touraine

Minister of Health and Sports
- In office 18 May 2007 – 13 November 2010
- President: Nicolas Sarkozy
- Prime Minister: François Fillon
- Preceded by: Philippe Bas
- Succeeded by: Xavier Bertrand

Minister of Ecology and Sustainable Development
- In office 6 May 2002 – 31 March 2004
- President: Jacques Chirac
- Prime Minister: Jean-Pierre Raffarin
- Preceded by: Yves Cochet
- Succeeded by: Serge Lepeltier

Member of the European Parliament
- In office 20 July 2004 – 17 May 2007
- Constituency: West France

Member of the National Assembly for Maine-et-Loire's 1st constituency
- In office 23 June 1988 – 7 June 2002
- Preceded by: Jean Narquin
- Succeeded by: René Bouin

Personal details
- Born: Roselyne Cora Marcelle Narquin; 24 December 1946 (age 79) Nevers, France
- Party: RPR (1982–2002); UMP (2002–2012)
- Spouse: Jacques Bachelot
- Parent: Jean Narquin (father)
- Education: University of Angers

Roselyne Cora Marcelle Bachelot-Narquin (French pronunciation: [ʁozlin baʃlo]; born 24 December 1946) is a French former politician who most recently served as Minister of Solidarity and Social Cohesion (2010–2012) in the third government of François Fillon and Minister of Culture (2020–2022) in the government of Jean Castex. She was a member of the Union for a Popular Movement (UMP), which was part of the European People's Party (EPP).

== Early life and education ==
Bachelot was born as Roselyne Narquin on 24 December 1946 in Nevers, France. Her father Jean Narquin, was a résistant and gaullist député, and her mother was Yvette Le Dû, a native from Gourin, both dentists. She has a brother, Jean-Yves Narquin, who ran for the European Parliament as a member of the National Front in 2015. Bachelot received a Doctorate in Pharmacy.

== Political career ==
=== Member of the French Parliament ===
From 1988 until 2002 and again in 2007, Bachelot was a member of the National Assembly, representing Maine-et-Loire's 1st constituency. During that time, she served on the Committee on Cultural Affairs.

=== Member of the European Parliament ===
From 2004 until 2007, Bachelot served as a Member of the European Parliament for the west of France. She was a member of the European Parliament's Committee on Employment and Social Affairs. She also was a substitute on the Committee on Industry, Research and Energy, a member of the Delegation for relations with the Palestinian Legislative Council, and a substitute for the Delegation for relations with Israel.

=== Career in government ===
From 2007 until 2010, Bachelot served as French Minister for Health and Sports. Since French ministers cannot be members of Parliament, she was forced to give up her seat in the European Parliament.

During her time in office, Bachelot implemented the planned prohibition on smoking in restaurants, bars, discos, casinos and other commercial pleasure enterprises in 2008. She notably issued a warning against excessive mobile phone use, especially by children. Also in 2008, she publicly endorsed legislation introduced by Valérie Boyer which would have made the promotion of extreme dieting a crime punishable by up to two years in prison and a fine of some $45,000; it passed the French lower house, but later failed in the Senate. She also encouraged the National Assembly of France to change the legal age to purchase alcohol in France from 16 to 18; the new law took effect in July 2009.

In 2009, Bachelot ordered 94 million vaccines from Sanofi Pasteur, GlaxoSmithKline, Novartis and Baxter International for the French Government at a cost of 869 million euros (and an option on 34 million additional vaccines in 2010) to fight against the H1N1 influenza virus; however, less than 10% of French population (about 6 million people) had been vaccinated by the end of the winter. She later canceled over half the flu vaccines ordered to combat the virus, in an effort to head off criticism after reserving too many shots.

In June 2010, Bachelot made headlines when she reduced some players of the France national football team to tears after the French players protested by refusing to practice in the 2010 FIFA World Cup. Domenech, head coach at the time, called the strike "an aberration, an imbecility, a stupidity without name" Monday. During a following meeting, Roselyne Bachelot said "It's your kids, our children, for whom perhaps you will no longer be heroes. It is the dreams of your partners, your friends, your fans that you have perhaps broken. You have tarnished the image of France."

In November 2010, Bachelot was appointed Minister of Social Affairs alongside Marie-Anne Montchamp and Claude Greff in the third François Fillon government. She was supposed to reform the public healthcare system for elderly people, but, due to the budgetary restrictions made necessary by the Great Recession, she had to abandon any reform project. After the victory of François Hollande at the French presidential election in 2012, she was replaced by Marisol Touraine. She announced that she would support former Prime Minister François Fillon for the Presidency of the Union for a Popular Movement.

== Later career ==
From 2012, Bachelot was a contributor in the French adaptation of The View alongside to former evening news anchor Laurence Ferrari and others.

In March 2016, Bachelot commented on Rafael Nadal's 2012–2013 injury stating: "On sait à peu près que la fameuse blessure de Rafael Nadal qui a entraîné sept mois d’arrêt de compétition est très certainement due à un contrôle positif." In response Nadal sued Bachelot over her comments in April 2016. The case was won by Nadal in November 2017 with Bachelot ordered to pay him 12,000 Euros.

In a 2016 op-ed published by Sunday newspaper Le Journal du Dimanche, Bachelot joined sixteen other high-profile women from across the political spectrum – including Élisabeth Guigou, Christine Lagarde, and Valérie Pécresse – in making a public vow to expose “all sexist remarks, inappropriate gestures and behaviour.”

On the eve of International Women's Day in 2018, Bachelot – alongside Marlène Schiappa and others – appeared in a performance of Eve Ensler's Vagina Monologues at the Bobino theater in Paris.

== Return to politics ==
On 6 July 2020, Bachelot was appointed Minister of Culture in the government of Prime Minister Jean Castex, under the presidency of Emmanuel Macron.

During her time in office, Bachelot oversaw efforts to stabilize the financial situation of museums, cinemas and theatres affected by public health measures amid the COVID-19 pandemic in France. She also worked on a 2021 agreement with Benin's President Patrice Talon on the return of 26 artworks seized by France in the 19th century from the Royal Palaces of Abomey. His ministry applies from 2022 massive cuts in funding for archaeology, in the order of -25% to -50% depending on the region.

== Other activities ==
- French Institute for International and Strategic Affairs (IRIS), Vice-President of the Board of Directors

== Political positions ==
Bachelot is a long-time supporter of same-sex marriage, and defied her party by speaking on the Assembly floor in favor of passing the PACs in 1999.

In 2005, Bachelot was one of the few prominent politicians who early and publicly defended Ségolène Royal's presidential bid – the first made by a woman in French history – ahead of the 2007 elections and denounced the sexist comments aimed at Royal.

In 2012, Bachelot successfully pleaded the case of two French feminist organizations – "Osez le féminisme!" ("Dare to be feminist!") and Les Chiennes de Garde (The Watchdogs) – with Prime Minister François Fillon who subsequently ordered the honorific "mademoiselle" – akin to "damsel" and the equivalent of "miss" – banished from official forms and registries across France.

== Personal life ==
Bachelot is married to Jacques Bachelot. Her brother-in-law, François Bachelot, served in the National Assembly from 1986 to 1988 as a member of the National Front.

On 20 March 2021, Roselyne Bachelot tested positive for COVID-19. On 24 March 2021, she was hospitalized but her condition was determined as "stable and not worrisome."

== Political career ==
Governmental functions

- Minister for Solidarity and Social Cohesion: 2010–2012.
- Minister of Health, Youth Affairs and Sports: 2007–2010.
- Minister of Environment, Ecology and Sustainable Development: 2002–2004.

Electoral mandates

European Parliament

- Member of European Parliament: 2004–2007 (Became minister in 2007, and reelected member of the National Assembly of France in 2007).

National Assembly of France

- Member of the National Assembly of France for Maine-et-Loire (1st constituency) : 1988–2002 (Became minister in 2002) / Reelected in 2007, but she became minister. Elected in 1988, reelected in 1993, 1997, 2002, 2007.

Regional Council

- Vice-president of the Regional Council of Pays de la Loire : 2001–2004.
- Regional councillor of Pays de la Loire: 1986–2007 (Resignation). Reelected in 1992, 1998, 2004.

General Council

- General councillor of Maine-et-Loire: 1982–1988.

== Radio ==
- Since 2014 : Les pieds dans le plat on Europe 1
- Since Fall 2015 : Les Grosses Têtes on RTL
