= Châteauneuf-sur-Sarthe =

- Part of Les Hauts-d'Anjou
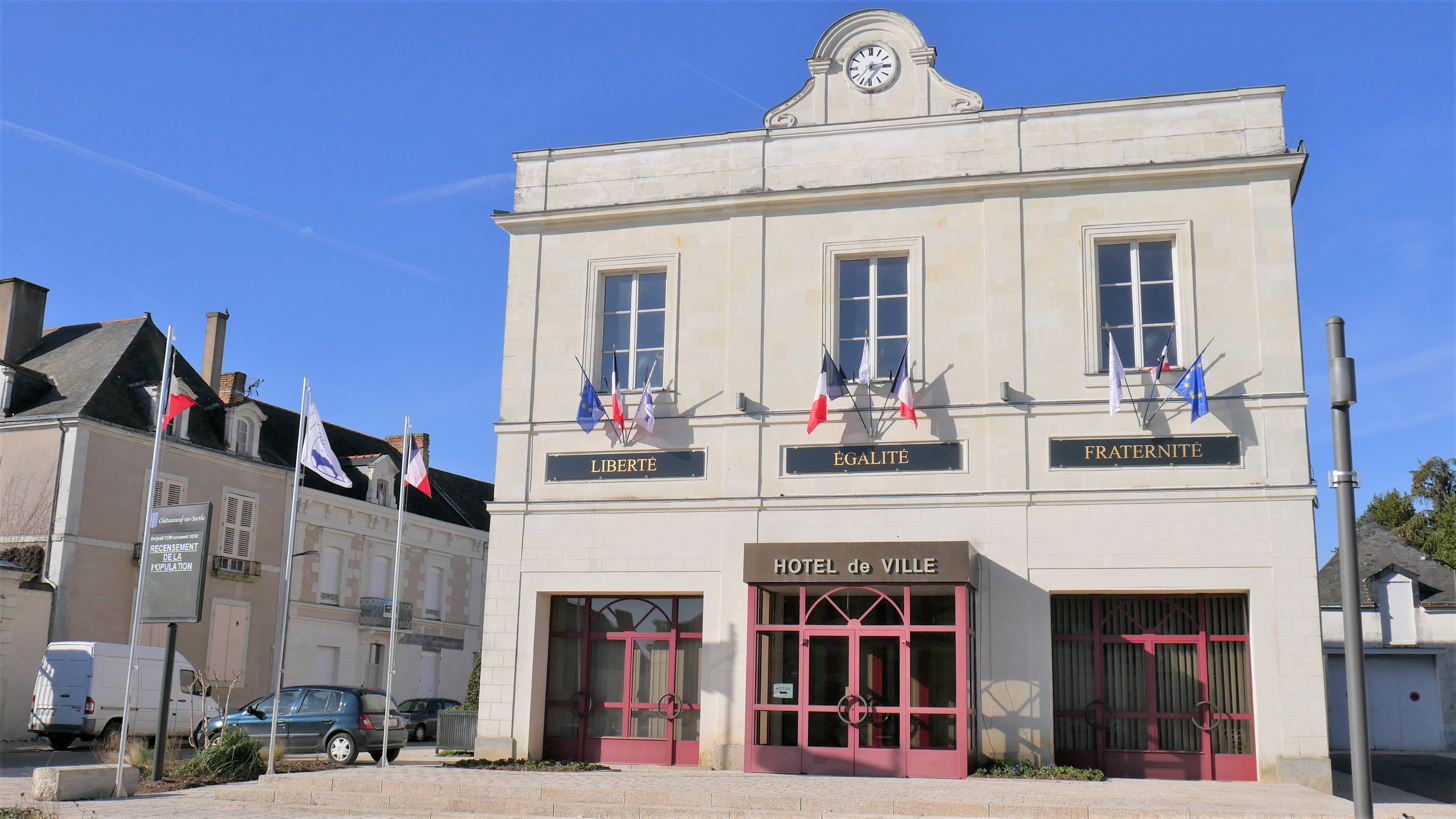
- The town hall in Châteauneuf-sur-Sarthe

- Coat of arms
- Location of Châteauneuf-sur-Sarthe
- Location within France Location within Pays de la Loire
- Coordinates: 47°40′54″N 0°29′14″W
- Country: France
- Region: Pays de la Loire
- Department: Maine-et-Loire
- Arrondissement: Segré
- Canton: Tiercé
- Commune: Les Hauts-d'Anjou
- Area^{1}: 14.39 km^{2} (5.56 sq mi)
- Elevation: 23 m (75 ft)
- Highest elevation: 72 m (236 ft)
- Lowest elevation: 16 m (52 ft)
- Population (2023): 3,084
  - Density: 214.3/km^{2} (555.1/sq mi)
- Demonym(s): Castelneuvien, Castelneuvienne
- Time zone: UTC+01:00 (CET)
  - Summer (DST): UTC+02:00 (CEST)
- Postal code: 49330
- Website: www.chateauneufsursarthe.fr
- ^{1} French Land Register data, which excludes lakes, ponds, glaciers > 1 km^{2} (0.386 sq mi or 247 acres) and river estuaries.

Châteauneuf-sur-Sarthe (French pronunciation: [ʃɑtonœf syʁ saʁt]) is a former commune in the Maine-et-Loire department of western France. On 1 January 2019, it was merged into the commune Les Hauts-d'Anjou. It is approximately 175 miles (280 km) from Paris. It had a population of 3,084 in 2023. The river Sarthe flows to the east of the town near where the Sarthe and river Mayenne join to form the river Maine.

Châteauneuf-sur-Sarthe is to the north of the Loire Valley, an area famous for its historic towns, wine-growing region and cultural landscape. The local areas is heavily farmed both for arable and pastoral uses.

Châteauneuf-sur-Sarthe has a bus stop but no train station, but the SNCF station in Etriché is 5 km away. By road the town is 19 km from exit 11 on the A11 with good links to Angers (20 miles) and Le Mans (50 miles) The nearest airports to are Angers, Le Mans, Nantes and Rennes; with the last two airports approximately 70 miles away.

== See also ==
- Communes of the Maine-et-Loire department
