= Cherré, Maine-et-Loire =

Cherré
- Part of Les Hauts-d'Anjou
- Coat of arms
- Location of Cherré
- Location within France Location within Pays de la Loire
- Coordinates: 47°42′41″N 0°33′43″W
- Country: France
- Region: Pays de la Loire
- Department: Maine-et-Loire
- Arrondissement: Segré
- Canton: Tiercé
- Commune: Les Hauts-d'Anjou
- Area^{1}: 13.91 km^{2} (5.37 sq mi)
- Elevation: 71 m (233 ft)
- Highest elevation: 74 m (243 ft)
- Lowest elevation: 35 m (115 ft)
- Population (2022): 551
  - Density: 39.6/km^{2} (103/sq mi)
- Demonym(s): Cheréen, Cheréenne
- Time zone: UTC+01:00 (CET)
  - Summer (DST): UTC+02:00 (CEST)
- Postal code: 49330
- ^{1} French Land Register data, which excludes lakes, ponds, glaciers > 1 km^{2} (0.386 sq mi or 247 acres) and river estuaries.

Cherré (French pronunciation: [ʃɛʁe]) is a former commune in the Maine-et-Loire department of western France. On 15 December 2016, it was merged into the new commune Les Hauts-d'Anjou.

== See also ==
- Communes of the Maine-et-Loire department
