= Chenillé-Changé =

Former commune in Pays de la Loire, France

- Part of Chenillé-Champteussé
- Location of Chenillé-Changé
- Location within France Location within Pays de la Loire
- Coordinates: 47°42′01″N 0°39′53″W
- Country: France
- Region: Pays de la Loire
- Department: Maine-et-Loire
- Arrondissement: Segré
- Canton: Tiercé
- Commune: Chenillé-Champteussé
- Area^{1}: 5.3 km^{2} (2.0 sq mi)
- Elevation: 23 m (75 ft)
- Highest elevation: 72 m (236 ft)
- Lowest elevation: 17 m (56 ft)
- Population (2022): 134
  - Density: 25/km^{2} (65/sq mi)
- Demonym(s): Chinilien, Chinilienne
- Time zone: UTC+01:00 (CET)
  - Summer (DST): UTC+02:00 (CEST)
- Postal code: 49220
- ^{1} French Land Register data, which excludes lakes, ponds, glaciers > 1 km^{2} (0.386 sq mi or 247 acres) and river estuaries.

Chenillé-Changé (French pronunciation: [ʃənije ʃɑ̃ʒe]) is a former commune in the Maine-et-Loire department of western France, located on the river Mayenne 27 km northwest of Angers. On 1 January 2016, it was merged into the new commune of Chenillé-Champteussé.

== See also ==
- Communes of the Maine-et-Loire department
