= Canton of Bar-le-Duc-Nord =

Former canton in Meuse, France

Coordinates: 48°45′44″N 5°07′47″E

- Former canton
- Location of the canton in the arrondissement of Bar-le-Duc
- Country: France
- Region: Grand Est
- Department: Meuse
- No. of communes: {{{nbcomm}}}
- Disbanded: 2015

Government
  - Representatives: Roland Corrier
- Population (2012): 11,907

The canton of Bar-le-Duc-Nord (French: Canton de Bar-le-Duc-Nord) is a former French canton located in the department of Meuse in the Lorraine region (now part of Grand Est). It is now part of the canton of Bar-le-Duc-1 and canton of Bar-le-Duc-2.

The last general councillor from this canton was Roland Corrier (PS), elected in 2004.

== Composition ==
The canton of Bar-le-Duc-Nord was made up of a fraction of the commune of Bar-le-Duc and 2 other communes and had 11,907 inhabitants (2012 census without double counts).

1. Bar-le-Duc (partly)
2. Fains-Véel
3. Longeville-en-Barrois
