= Results of the 2024 French legislative election in Meuse =

Following the first round of the 2024 French legislative election on 30 June 2024, runoff elections in each constituency where no candidate received a vote share greater than 50 percent were scheduled for 7 July. Candidates permitted to stand in the runoff elections needed to either come in first or second place in the first round or achieve more than 12.5 percent of the votes of the entire electorate (as opposed to 12.5 percent of the vote share due to low turnout).

== Meuse ==
=== 1st constituency ===
| Candidate | Party or alliance | | First round | | Second round | |
| Candidate | Party or alliance | | Votes | % | Votes | % |
|---|---|---|---|---|---|---|
| Maxime Amblard | National Rally | | 23,680 | 47.95 | 25,411 | 50.49 |
| Bertrand Pancher | Miscellaneous right | Independent | 16,901 | 34.22 | 24,918 | 49.51 |
| Olivier Guckert | New Popular Front | Socialist Party | 7,066 | 14.31 | | |
| Sylvie Mariage | Sovereigntist right | Debout la France | 708 | 1.43 | | |
| Grégoire Moutaux | Miscellaneous right | | 548 | 1.11 | | |
| Blaise Tymen | Far-left | Lutte Ouvrière | 481 | 0.97 | | |
| Total | | | 49,384 | 100.00 | 50,329 | 100.00 |
| Valid votes | | | 49,384 | 96.93 | 50,329 | 96.94 |
| Invalid votes | | | 630 | 1.24 | 474 | 0.91 |
| Blank votes | | | 932 | 1.83 | 1,117 | 2.15 |
| Total votes | | | 50,946 | 100.00 | 51,920 | 100.00 |
| Registered voters/turnout | | | 74,962 | 67.96 | 74,914 | 69.31 |

=== 2nd constituency ===
| Candidate | Party or alliance | | Votes | % |
|---|---|---|---|---|
| Florence Goulet | National Rally | | 19,011 | 50.63 |
| Jérôme Dumont | Miscellaneous right | Independent | 11,976 | 31.89 |
| Johan Laflotte | New Popular Front | Socialist Party | 5,391 | 14.36 |
| Valentine Lafue | Ecologists | | 742 | 1.98 |
| Pierre Nordemann | Far-left | Lutte Ouvrière | 431 | 1.15 |
| Total | | | 37,551 | 100.00 |
| Valid votes | | | 37,551 | 97.28 |
| Invalid votes | | | 357 | 0.92 |
| Blank votes | | | 691 | 1.79 |
| Total votes | | | 38,599 | 100.00 |
| Registered voters/turnout | | | 59,230 | 65.17 |
