= Meuse's 2nd constituency =

Constituency of the National Assembly of France

2nd constituency of Meuse
- inline Constituency of the National Assembly of France

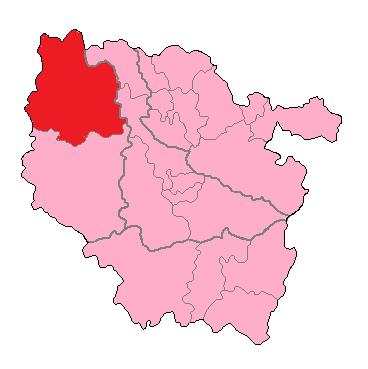
- Meuse's 2nd Constituency shown within Lorraine
- Deputy: Florence Goulet; RN
- Department: Meuse
- Cantons: Charny-sur-Meuse, Clermont-en-Argonne, Damvillers, Dun-sur-Meuse, Étain, Fresnes-en-Woëvre, Montfaucon, Montmédy, Souilly, Spincourt, Stenay, Varennes-en-Argonne, Verdun-Centre, Verdun-Est, Verdun-Ouest
- Registered voters: 61,296

The 2nd constituency of Meuse is a French legislative constituency in the Meuse département.

== Description ==
The 2nd constituency of Meuse covers the northern portion of the department. It includes the town of Verdun infamous for its role in the First World War.

From 1988 until 2017 the seat has been held by Jean-Louis Dumont, a former mayor of Verdun, of the Socialist Party. However, between 1993 and 1997 when it was held by Arsène Lux of the Gaullist RPR.

== Historic Representation ==
Election	Member	Party
1986	Proportional representation – no election by constituency	
1988	Jean-Louis Dumont	PS
1993	Arsène Lux	RPR
1997	Jean-Louis Dumont	PS
2002	Jean-Louis Dumont	PS
2007	Jean-Louis Dumont	PS
2012	Jean-Louis Dumont	PS
2017	Émilie Cariou	LREM
2020	Émilie Cariou	EDS
2020	Émilie Cariou	ND
2022	Florence Goulet	RN

== Election results ==
=== 2024 ===
Legislative Election 2024: Meuse's 2nd constituency
Party	Candidate	Votes	%	±%
RN	Florence Goulet	19,011	50.63	+17.95
DVD	Jérôme Dumont	11,976	31.89	N/A
PS (NFP)	Johan Laflotte	5,391	14.36	N/A
DVE	Valentine Lafue	742	1.98	−0.94
LO	Pierre Nordemann	431	1.15	N/A
Turnout				
Registered electors				
2nd round result
Turnout				
Registered electors				
RN hold		Swing		

=== 2022 ===
Legislative Election 2022: Meuse's 2nd constituency
Party	Candidate	Votes	%	±%
RN	Florence Goulet	8,695	32.68	+14.04
MoDem (Ensemble)	Anne Bois	5,101	19.17	-7.97
EELV (NUPÉS)	Johan Laflotte	4,318	16.23	−3.59
LR (UDC)	Jean-Marie Addenet	3,588	13.49	+1.29
DVG	Pascal Haros	1,822	6.85	N/A
DVE	Yves Dhyvert	778	2.92	+0.10
REC	Michel Menneson	676	2.54	N/A
DVC	Martin Gallic	658	2.47	N/A
Others	N/A	969	-	−
Turnout		26,605	45.72	−2.92
2nd round result
RN	Florence Goulet	13,269	53.50	+16.26
MoDem (Ensemble)	Anne Bois	11,534	46.50	−16.26
Turnout		24,803	45.05	+0.98
RN gain from LREM				

=== 2017 ===
Candidate	Label	First round		Second round	
Candidate	Label	Votes	%	Votes	%
Émilie Cariou	REM	7,777	27.10	14,969	62.76
Éric Vilain	FN	5,349	18.64	8,881	37.24
Jérôme Dumont	DVD	5,181	18.05		
Pierre Regent	LR	3,500	12.20		
Jean-Louis Dumont	PS	2,848	9.92		
Michaël Clément	FI	2,000	6.97		
François-Xavier Franceschini	PCF	842	2.93		
Yves Dhyvert	ECO	810	2.82		
Marcel Périn	EXG	257	0.90		
Maryse Vasseur	DIV	134	0.47		
Votes		28,698	100.00	23,850	100.00
Valid votes		28,698	97.87	23,850	89.78
Blank votes		462	1.58	2,025	7.62
Null votes		162	0.55	690	2.60
Turnout		29,322	48.64	26,565	44.07
Abstentions		30,957	51.36	33,709	55.93
Registered voters		60,279		60,274	
Source: Ministry of the Interior

=== 2012 ===
Legislative Election 2012: Meuse's 2nd constituency
Party	Candidate	Votes	%	±%
PS	Jean-Louis Dumont	12,581	35.86	
UMP	Claude Leonard	9,089	25.91	
FN	Gilbert Prot	5,821	16.59	
DVD	Julien Didry	4,865	13.87	
FG	Eric Bernardi	1,421	4.05	
EELV	Dominique Ronga	909	2.59	
Others	N/A	397		
Turnout		35,083	57.23	
2nd round result
PS	Jean-Louis Dumont	17,286	51.53	
UMP	Claude Leonard	16,257	48.47	
Turnout		33,543	54.72	
PS hold				

== Sources ==
- French Interior Ministry results website: "Résultats électoraux officiels en France" (in French).
