= Chardogne =

- Commune
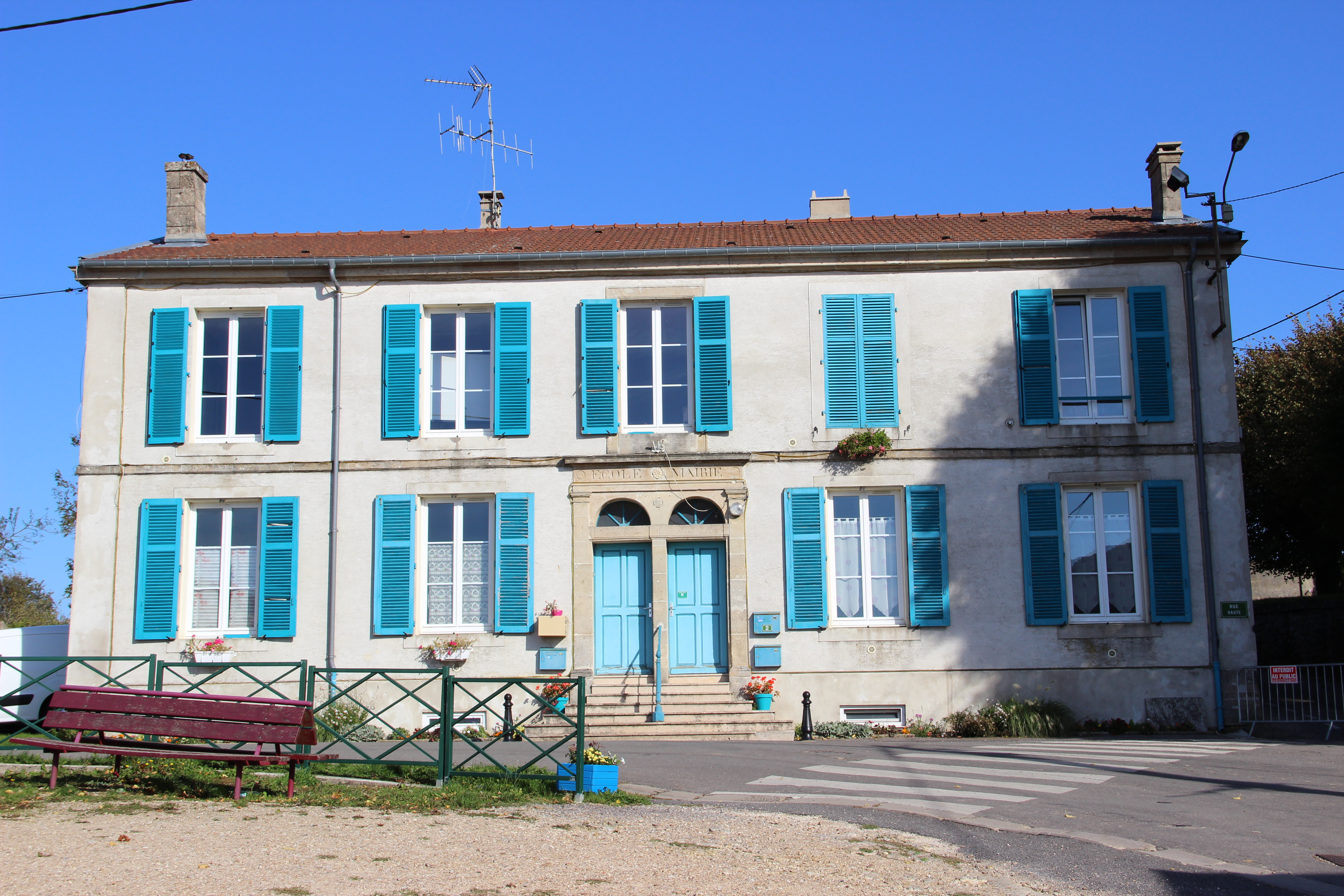
- The town hall in Chardogne

- Coat of arms
- Location of Chardogne
- Location within France Location within Grand Est
- Coordinates: 48°49′30″N 5°07′36″E
- Country: France
- Region: Grand Est
- Department: Meuse
- Arrondissement: Bar-le-Duc
- Canton: Bar-le-Duc-2
- Intercommunality: CA Bar-le-Duc - Sud Meuse

Government
  - Mayor (2020–2026): Benoît Hacquin
- Area^{1}: 12.82 km^{2} (4.95 sq mi)
- Elevation: 237 m (778 ft)
- Highest elevation: 273 m (896 ft)
- Lowest elevation: 179 m (587 ft)
- Population (2023): 305
  - Density: 23.8/km^{2} (61.6/sq mi)
- Time zone: UTC+01:00 (CET)
  - Summer (DST): UTC+02:00 (CEST)
- INSEE/Postal code: 55101 /55000
- ^{1} French Land Register data, which excludes lakes, ponds, glaciers > 1 km^{2} (0.386 sq mi or 247 acres) and river estuaries.

Chardogne (French pronunciation: [ʃaʁdɔɲ]) is a commune in the Meuse department in Grand Est in north-eastern France.

== See also ==
- Communes of the Meuse department
