= André Rougé =

French politician (born 1961)

André Rougé MEP
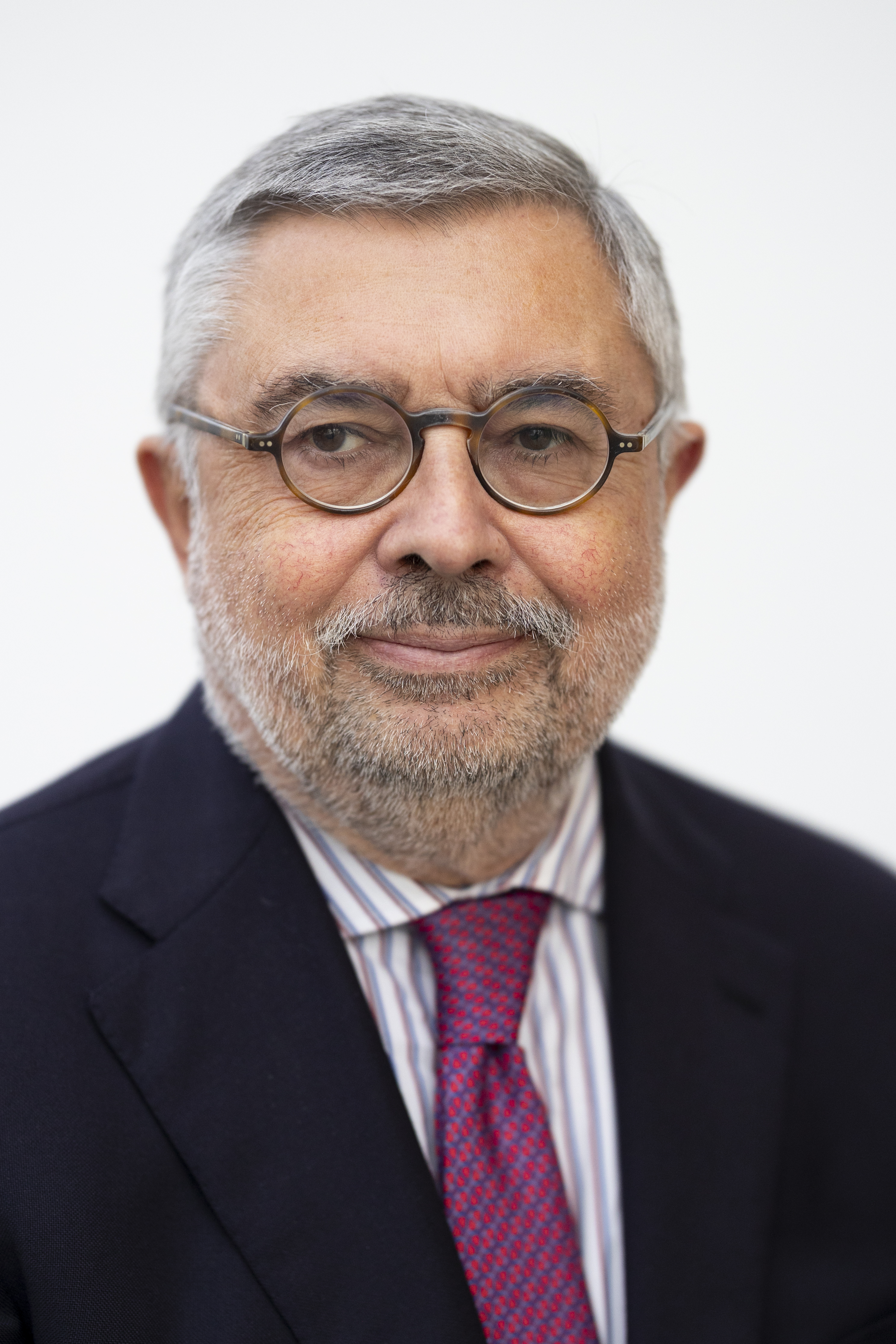

Member of the European Parliament for France
- Incumbent
- Assumed office 2 July 2019

Personal details
- Born: 23 December 1961 (age 64) Paris (France)
- Party: RPR (1980-2002); UMP (2002-2005); National Rally (since 2015)
- Spouse: Florence Goulet
- Education: Paris-Panthéon-Assas University; Ecole spéciale militaire de Saint-Cyr

André Rougé (born 23 December 1961) is a French politician who was elected as a Member of the European Parliament in 2019 and re-elected in 2024. Member of the National Rally, he is the party's national delegate for overseas France. He is also the founder and chairman of the influential think tank Les Horaces. According to Le Monde, he is a 'man in the shadow of Marine Le Pen's entourage'. He is seen as a likely minister in the event of an RN victory in France.

== Early life ==
=== Education ===
André Rougé studied law at the Paris-Panthéon-Assas University. He also received military training at the Ecole spéciale militaire de Saint-Cyr.

=== Military and reporter ===
For the next few years, he was a soldier in the 6th Marine Infantry Parachute Regiment. Then, until 1986, he was a journalist-reporter. He covered the Sandinista rebellion of Nicaragua with the Miskitos and the Comandante Cero, Edén Pastora.

=== Professional career ===
After having held the positions of director of external relations in the Bouygues group from 2002 to 2018, he is a consultant for companies.

== Political life ==
=== Rassemblement pour la République (RPR) ===
In 1986, he met Alain Peyrefitte (RPR), with whom he campaigned (for the legislative and regional elections) in Seine-et-Marne. Afterwards, Alain Peyrefitte recommended him to Michel Debré, former Primer Minister and MP for La Réunion, who recruited him as a parliamentary assistant.

Alain Juppé then employed him at the RPR as an overseas specialist. It was in this capacity that he joined the cabinet of the Minister for Overseas France, Dominique Perben, from which he resigned in December 1994 to become the coordinator of the overseas campaign of Jacques Chirac, candidate for the Presidency of the Republic who will win the election in 1995.

He then became chief of staff to Éric Raoult, Minister for Urban Affairs, and special adviser to Jean-Louis Debré, Minister for the Interior. At the request of the Prime Minister's office, he joined the office of Jean-Jacques de Peretti, Minister for Overseas France. During this period, he was a member of the RPR National Council.

Alongside his professional activities in the private sector, André Rougé retained his political responsibilities: general delegate for the Association of Friends of Jacques Chirac, chaired by Bernard Pons. In the 2001 municipal elections in La Rochelle, he headed the RPR list, which came 3rd.

=== Union pour un mouvement populaire (UMP) ===
When the UMP was formed in 2002, Alain Juppé appointed him national secretary for the party's overseas federations. In 2002, he set up the "Richelieu Network", which brings together all the contractual members of ministerial cabinets who are regularly received by serving ministers.

=== Rassemblement national (RN) ===
In 2015, he founded the think tank "Les Horaces", in reference to the Horatii, to help Marine Le Pen and the Rassemblement National come to power.

He was elected as an MEP in 21st place on the RN list for the 2019 European elections, led by Jordan Bardella. Since then, he has sat on the Committee on Regional Development (REGI) and joined the Delegation for relations with the Federative Republic of Brazil (D-Br) as a full member and the Delegation for relations with Mercosur (DMer) as a substitute.

André Rougé is opposed to the project of co-management of the scattered islands, with Madagascar, proposed by French President Emmanuel Macron.

Following the RN's success in the French overseas territories in these elections, Marine Le Pen appointed him RN national delegate for the overseas territories. André Rougé is also a member of the RN national bureau. According to Le Monde, he is a "good connoisseur of overseas political life" and is working on the overseas section of Marine Le Pen and Jordan Bardella's programme for the 2022 presidential election. According to Le Monde, he is a 'man in the shadow of Marine Le Pen's entourage'. He is seen as a likely minister in the event of an RN victory.

With 31% of the vote during the 2024 Europeans elections, the Rassemblement National sent 30 MEPs to the European Parliament. Rougé return to the European Parliament on 16 July 2024.

== Les Horaces ==
After the November 2015 Paris attacks, convinced that only Marine Le Pen is determined to fight effectively against Islamist terrorism, he created a think-tank called "Les Horaces". It is a group of senior officials, former members of ministerial cabinets, businessmen, leaders, and senior management profiles who put themselves at the service of the president of the National Rally. Les Horaces has played a leading role in shaping the policies of the far-right National Rally in France since the mid-2010s.

== Personal life ==
He was born in Paris.

André Rouget is married and the father of a boy. His wife Florence Goulet, daughter of the MP and Senator for l'Orne Daniel Goulet, is elected MP for the Meuse in 2022.
