= Pierre Pimpie =

French politician (born 1971)

Pierre Pimpie MEP
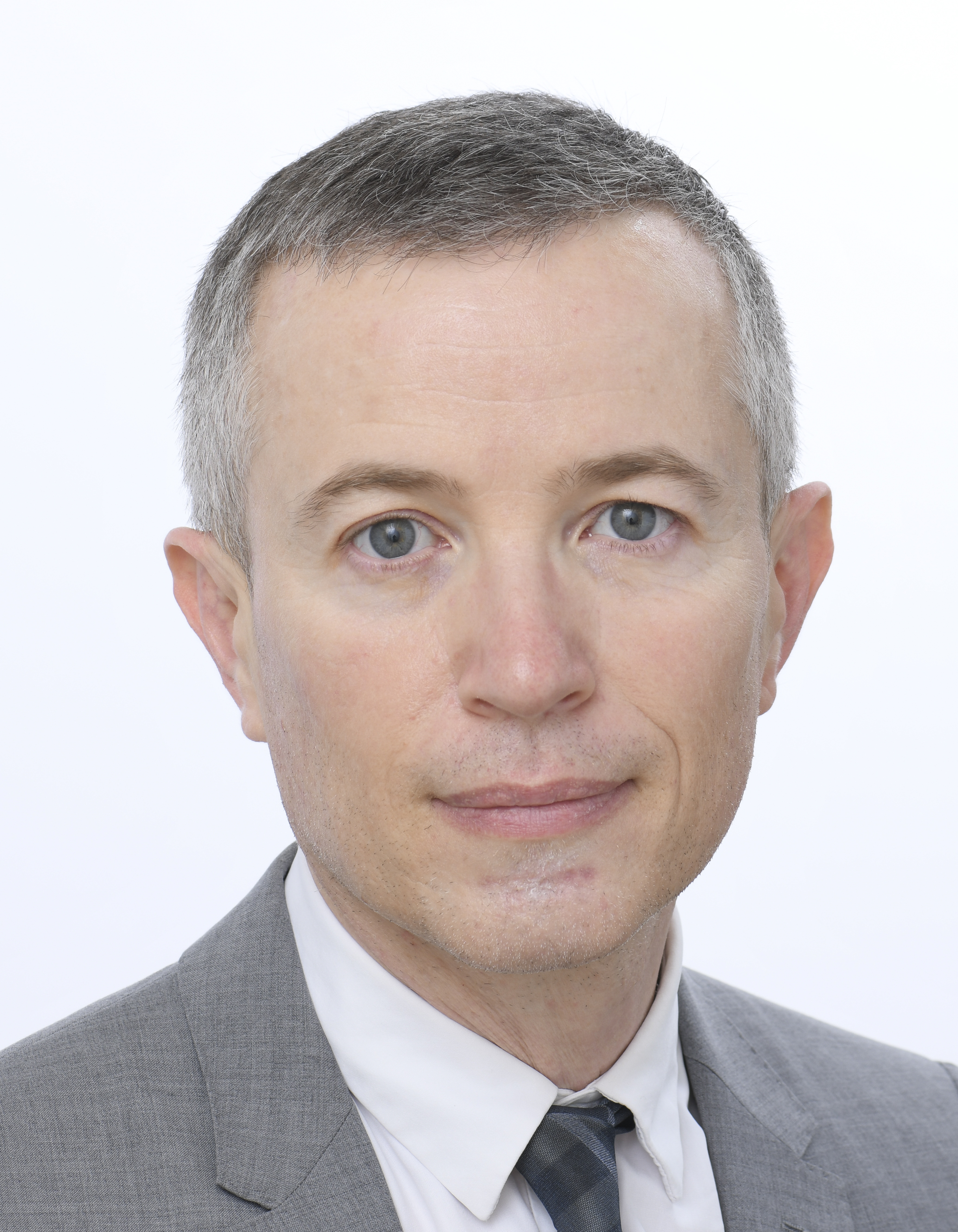
- Pimpie in 2024

Member of the European Parliament for the France
- Incumbent
- Assumed office 16 July 2024

Personal details
- Born: 10 September 1971 (age 54)
- Party: National Rally
- Other political affiliations: Patriots for Europe

Pierre Pimpie (born 10 September 1971) is a French politician of the National Rally who was elected member of the European Parliament in 2024. He has been a member of Les Horaces since 2021 and served as deputy director general of EPSF.
