= Behonne =

- Commune
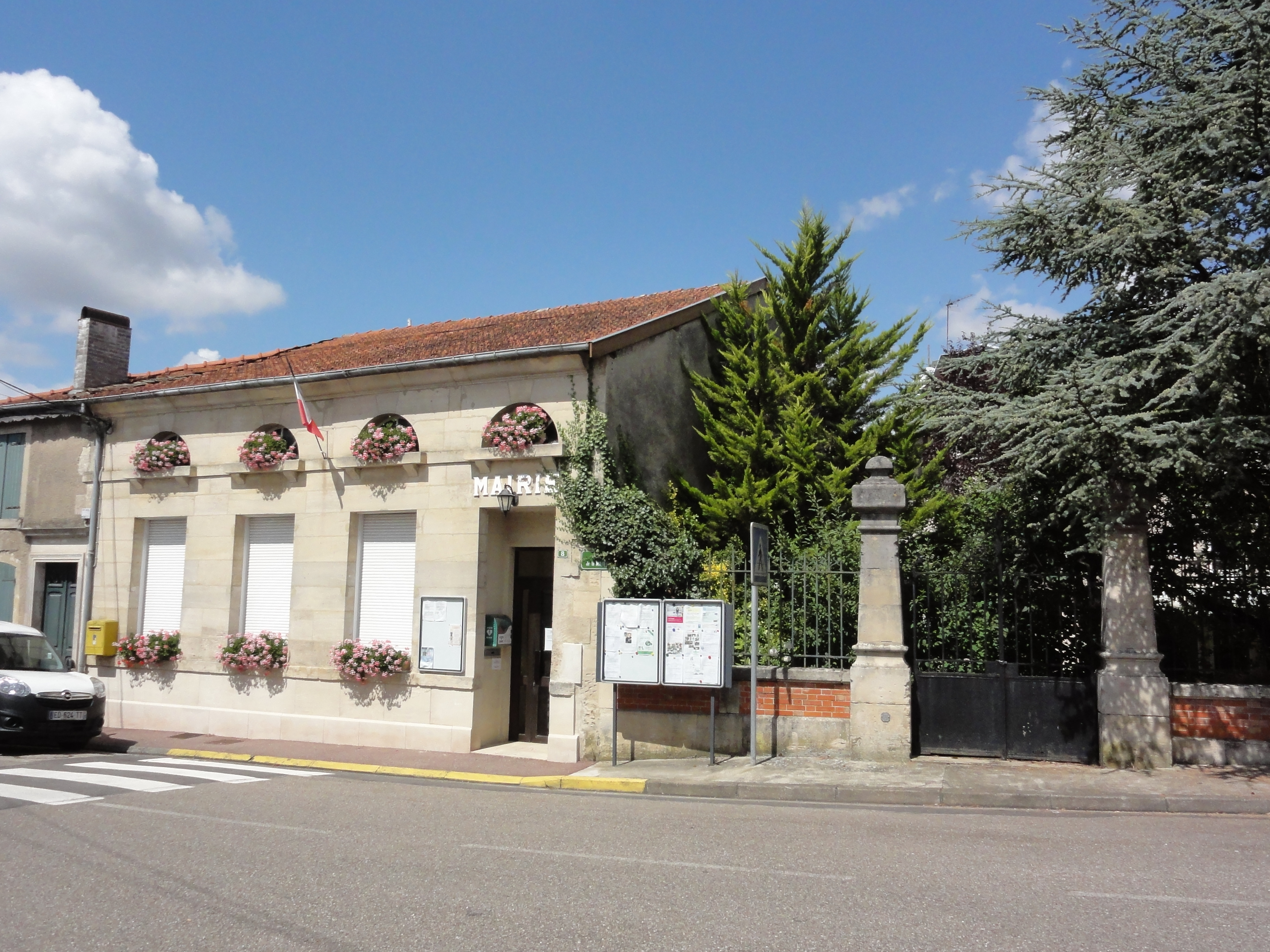
- The town hall in Behonne

- Coat of arms
- Location of Behonne
- Location within France Location within Grand Est
- Coordinates: 48°47′39″N 5°10′57″E
- Country: France
- Region: Grand Est
- Department: Meuse
- Arrondissement: Bar-le-Duc
- Canton: Bar-le-Duc-2
- Intercommunality: CA Bar-le-Duc - Sud Meuse

Government
  - Mayor (2020–2026): Jérôme Chardin
- Area^{1}: 9.17 km^{2} (3.54 sq mi)
- Elevation: 302 m (991 ft)
- Highest elevation: 303 m (994 ft)
- Lowest elevation: 190 m (620 ft)
- Population (2023): 595
  - Density: 64.9/km^{2} (168/sq mi)
- Time zone: UTC+01:00 (CET)
  - Summer (DST): UTC+02:00 (CEST)
- INSEE/Postal code: 55041 /55000
- ^{1} French Land Register data, which excludes lakes, ponds, glaciers > 1 km^{2} (0.386 sq mi or 247 acres) and river estuaries.

Behonne (French pronunciation: [bəˈɔn]) is a commune in the Meuse department in the Grand Est region in northeastern France.

== Climate ==
On average, Behonne experiences 50.6 days per year with a minimum temperature below 0 °C (32.0 °F), 1.3 days per year with a minimum temperature below −10 °C (14.0 °F), 9.1 days per year with a maximum temperature below 0 °C (32.0 °F), and 12.4 days per year with a maximum temperature above 30 °C (86.0 °F). The record high temperature was 40.4 °C (104.7 °F) on July 25, 2019, while the record low temperature was −16.4 °C (2.5 °F) on December 20, 2009.

Climate data for Behonne (1991–2020 normals, extremes 2007–present)
| Month | Jan | Feb | Mar | Apr | May | Jun | Jul | Aug | Sep | Oct | Nov | Dec | Year |
|---|---|---|---|---|---|---|---|---|---|---|---|---|---|
| Record high °C (°F) | 15.0 (59.0) | 21.4 (70.5) | 25.4 (77.7) | 27.4 (81.3) | 32.8 (91.0) | 36.3 (97.3) | 40.4 (104.7) | 37.2 (99.0) | 34.3 (93.7) | 28.2 (82.8) | 22.6 (72.7) | 16.4 (61.5) | 40.4 (104.7) |
| Mean daily maximum °C (°F) | 5.1 (41.2) | 6.4 (43.5) | 10.8 (51.4) | 15.7 (60.3) | 18.8 (65.8) | 22.5 (72.5) | 25.2 (77.4) | 24.6 (76.3) | 20.5 (68.9) | 15.0 (59.0) | 9.5 (49.1) | 6.2 (43.2) | 15.0 (59.1) |
| Daily mean °C (°F) | 2.9 (37.2) | 3.6 (38.5) | 6.8 (44.2) | 10.7 (51.3) | 13.7 (56.7) | 17.2 (63.0) | 19.7 (67.5) | 19.4 (66.9) | 15.6 (60.1) | 11.5 (52.7) | 7.0 (44.6) | 3.9 (39.0) | 11.0 (51.8) |
| Mean daily minimum °C (°F) | 0.6 (33.1) | 0.7 (33.3) | 2.9 (37.2) | 5.7 (42.3) | 8.6 (47.5) | 11.9 (53.4) | 14.1 (57.4) | 14.2 (57.6) | 10.7 (51.3) | 8.0 (46.4) | 4.4 (39.9) | 1.6 (34.9) | 7.0 (44.5) |
| Record low °C (°F) | −11.0 (12.2) | −14.2 (6.4) | −7.3 (18.9) | −4.4 (24.1) | −0.7 (30.7) | 3.5 (38.3) | 6.7 (44.1) | 4.5 (40.1) | 2.2 (36.0) | −3.2 (26.2) | −6.3 (20.7) | −16.4 (2.5) | −16.4 (2.5) |
| Average precipitation mm (inches) | 81.2 (3.20) | 71.2 (2.80) | 64.3 (2.53) | 50.2 (1.98) | 72.9 (2.87) | 64.0 (2.52) | 64.8 (2.55) | 68.5 (2.70) | 70.9 (2.79) | 71.1 (2.80) | 80.0 (3.15) | 96.6 (3.80) | 855.7 (33.69) |
| Average precipitation days (≥ 1.0 mm) | 13.7 | 11.9 | 10.8 | 8.5 | 11.5 | 10.0 | 9.2 | 9.1 | 7.8 | 10.8 | 12.9 | 14.5 | 130.7 |
Source: Meteociel

== Population ==
Historical population
| Year | Pop. | ±% p.a. |
|---|---|---|
| 1968 | 338 | — |
| 1975 | 337 | −0.04% |
| 1982 | 818 | +13.51% |
| 1990 | 848 | +0.45% |
| 1999 | 770 | −1.07% |
| 2007 | 694 | −1.29% |
| 2012 | 652 | −1.24% |
| 2017 | 609 | −1.36% |
| 2023 | 595 | −0.39% |
Source: INSEE

== See also ==
- Communes of the Meuse department
