= Vavincourt =

- Commune
- Coat of arms
- Location of Vavincourt
- Location within France Location within Grand Est
- Coordinates: 48°49′28″N 5°12′34″E
- Country: France
- Region: Grand Est
- Department: Meuse
- Arrondissement: Bar-le-Duc
- Canton: Bar-le-Duc-2
- Intercommunality: CA Bar-le-Duc - Sud Meuse

Government
  - Mayor (2020–2026): Jean-Luc Obara
- Area^{1}: 15.93 km^{2} (6.15 sq mi)
- Elevation: 252 m (827 ft)
- Highest elevation: 327 m (1,073 ft)
- Lowest elevation: 200 m (660 ft)
- Population (2023): 534
  - Density: 33.5/km^{2} (86.8/sq mi)
- Time zone: UTC+01:00 (CET)
  - Summer (DST): UTC+02:00 (CEST)
- INSEE/Postal code: 55541 /55000
- ^{1} French Land Register data, which excludes lakes, ponds, glaciers > 1 km^{2} (0.386 sq mi or 247 acres) and river estuaries.

Vavincourt (French pronunciation: [vavɛ̃kuʁ]) is a commune in the Meuse department in Grand Est in north-eastern France.

== See also ==
- Communes of the Meuse department
