= Alexandre Varaut =

French lawyer and politician (born 1966)

Alexandre Varaut MEP
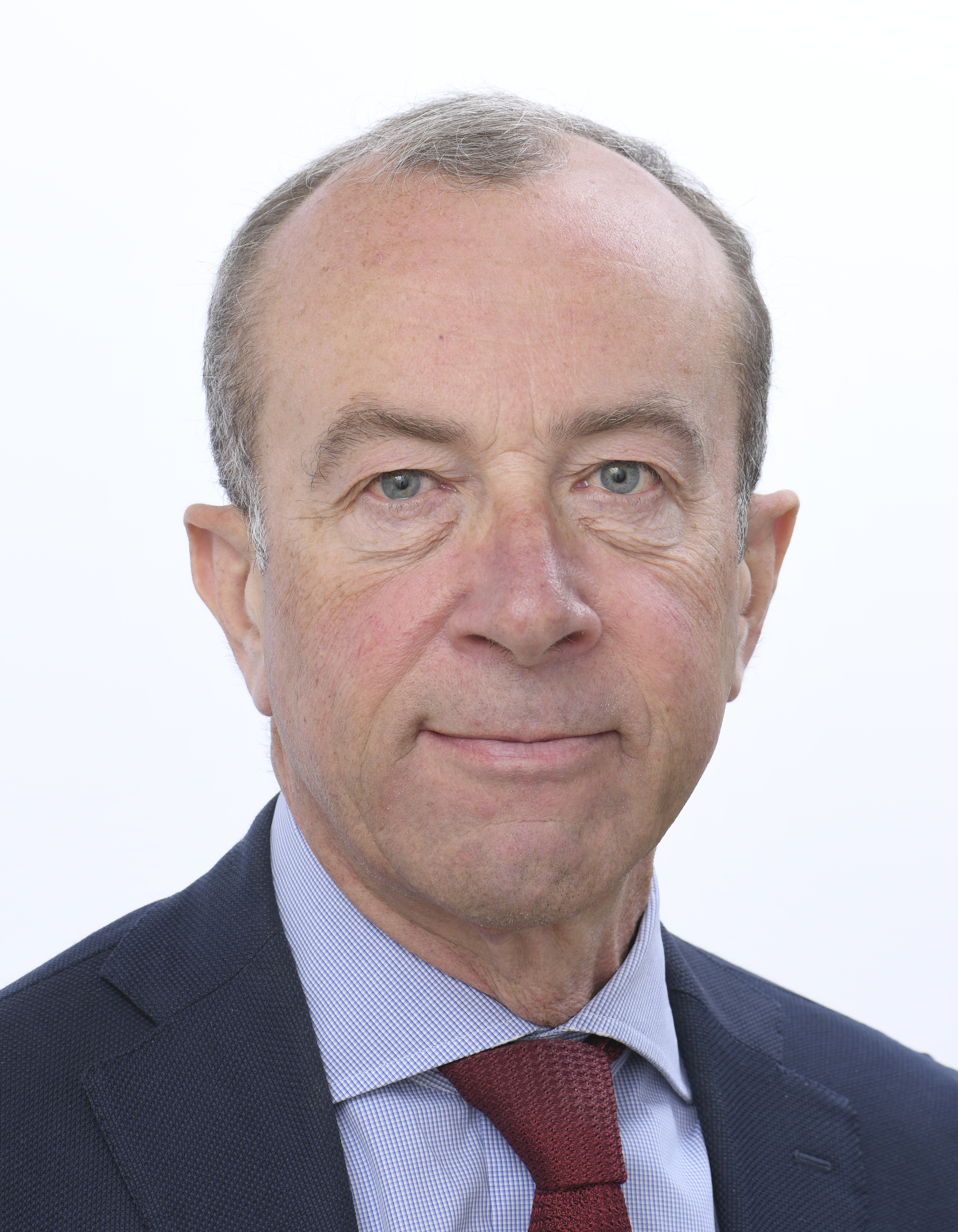
- Varaut in 2024

Member of the European Parliament for France
- Incumbent
- Assumed office 16 July 2024
- In office 17 December 1999 – 19 July 2004
- Preceded by: Philippe de Villiers

Personal details
- Born: 18 January 1966 (age 60) Neuilly-sur-Seine, France
- Party: Movement for France (1995–1999, 2000–2004); Rally for France (1999–2000); Union for a Popular Movement (2004–2015); National Rally (2021–present)
- Other political affiliations: Union for Europe of the Nations (1999–2001); Patriots for Europe (2024–present)
- Parent: Jean-Marc Varaut (father)
- Education: Panthéon-Assas University
- Occupation: Lawyer

Alexandre Varaut (French pronunciation: [alɛksɑ̃dʁ(ə) vaʁo]; born 18 January 1966) is a French lawyer and politician of the National Rally (RN) who was elected a member of the European Parliament (MEP) in 2024. He was previously an MEP from 1999 to 2004, representing the Rally for France (RPF) and Movement for France (MPF).

== Career ==
Varaut was born in the Parisian suburb of Neuilly-sur-Seine in 1966, as the son of lawyer Jean-Marc Varaut. Having been a fierce opponent of the Maastricht Treaty of 1992, he joined the Movement for France in 1995, shortly after the 1995 French presidential election.

He became a member of the European Parliament in 1999, after Philippe de Villiers resigned his seat. In 2004 he was a candidate for the Union for a Popular Movement in the French regional election in Île-de-France, and in the 2007 legislative election he contested Seine-Saint-Denis's 5th constituency. He was appointed national secretary of the Union for a Popular Movement in 2013, and held the position for 18 months.

Varaut has been described as "the National Rally's favourite lawyer." He has represented Marine Le Pen, David Rachline, Frédéric Chatillon, Guillaume Peltier and La Manif pour Tous, among others. In 2018 he became an advisor to Le Pen, as a member of Les Horaces. He joined the National Rally in 2021, and returned to the European Parliament in 2024.
