= Fains-Véel =

- Commune
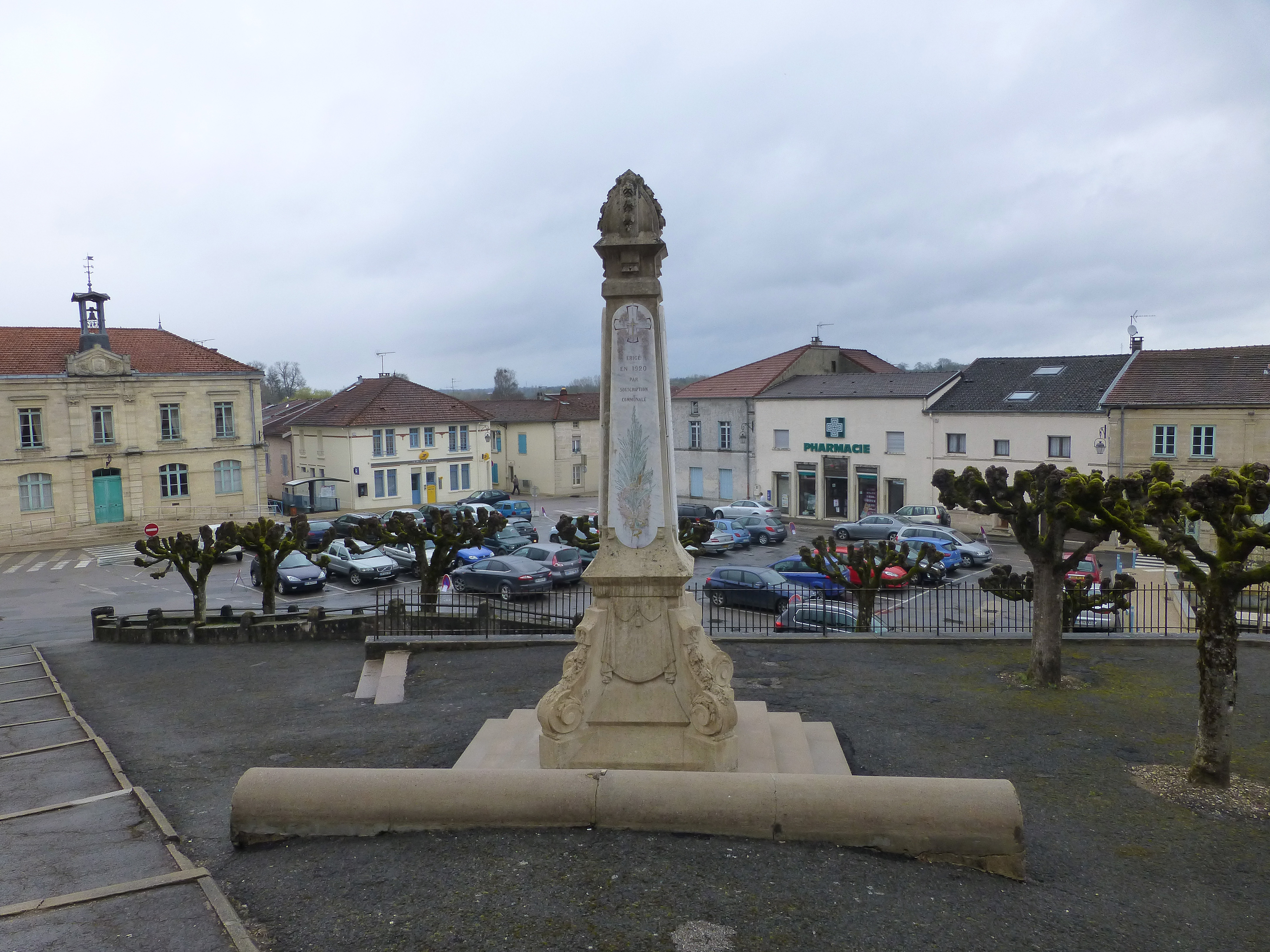
- The war memorial and town hall square in Fains-Véel

- Coat of arms
- Location of Fains-Véel
- Location within France Location within Grand Est
- Coordinates: 48°47′28″N 5°07′37″E
- Country: France
- Region: Grand Est
- Department: Meuse
- Arrondissement: Bar-le-Duc
- Canton: Bar-le-Duc-2
- Intercommunality: CA Bar-le-Duc - Sud Meuse

Government
  - Mayor (2020–2026): Gérard Abbas
- Area^{1}: 18.3 km^{2} (7.1 sq mi)
- Elevation: 177 m (581 ft)
- Highest elevation: 272 m (892 ft)
- Lowest elevation: 170 m (560 ft)
- Population (2023): 2,080
  - Density: 114/km^{2} (294/sq mi)
- Time zone: UTC+01:00 (CET)
  - Summer (DST): UTC+02:00 (CEST)
- INSEE/Postal code: 55186 /55000
- ^{1} French Land Register data, which excludes lakes, ponds, glaciers > 1 km^{2} (0.386 sq mi or 247 acres) and river estuaries.

Fains-Véel (French pronunciation: [fɛ̃ vɛl]) is a commune in the Meuse department in Grand Est in north-eastern France.

== Population ==
Historical population
Year	Pop.	±% p.a.
1968	2,606	—
1975	2,588	−0.10%
1982	2,513	−0.42%
1990	2,447	−0.33%
1999	2,290	−0.73%
2007	2,282	−0.04%
2012	2,224	−0.51%
2017	2,140	−0.77%
2023	2,080	−0.47%
Source: INSEE

== See also ==
- Communes of the Meuse department
