= Arrondissements of the Meuse department =

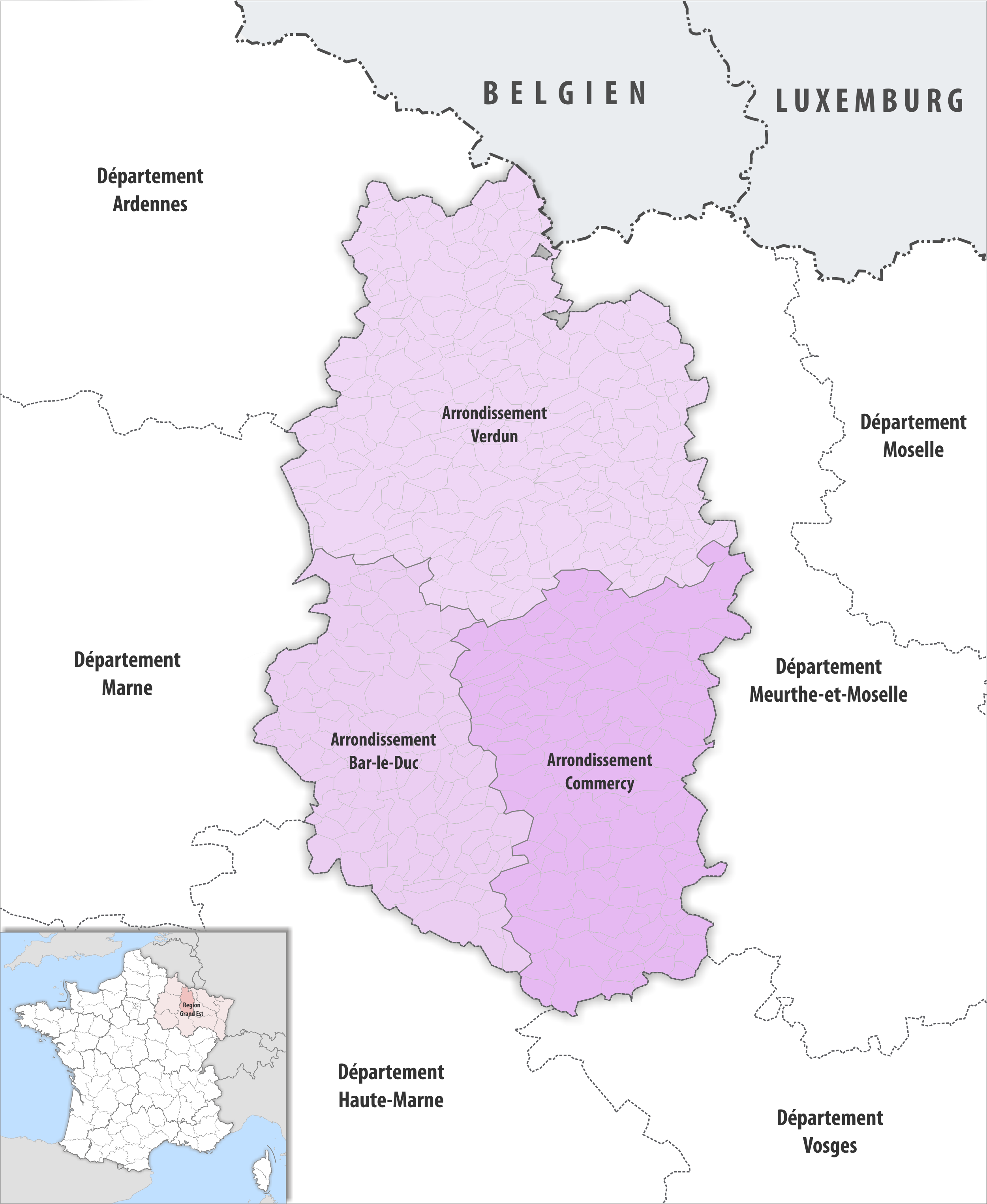
Map of arrondissements of the Meuse department.

The 3 arrondissements of the Meuse department are:

1. Arrondissement of Bar-le-Duc, (prefecture of the Meuse department: Bar-le-Duc) with 110 communes. The population of the arrondissement was 57,514 in 2021.
2. Arrondissement of Commercy, (subprefecture: Commercy) with 135 communes. The population of the arrondissement was 42,088 in 2021.
3. Arrondissement of Verdun, (subprefecture: Verdun) with 254 communes. The population of the arrondissement was 82,317 in 2021.

== History ==
In 1800 the arrondissements of Bar-le-Duc, Commercy, Montmédy and Verdun were established. The arrondissement of Montmédy was disbanded in 1926.
