= Departmental Council of Meuse =

Departmental legislature in France

The Departmental Council of Meuse (French: Conseil départemental de la Meuse) is the deliberative assembly of the Meuse department of France. Its headquarters are in Bar-le-Duc, capital of the department.

The departmental council consists of 34 departmental councilors, elected from the 17 cantons of Meuse for a six year term.

== President ==
The current president of the departmental council is Jérôme Dumont (DVD) since the 2021 elections, succeeding Claude Léonard.

== Vice-presidents ==
To support the president, 10 vice-presidents are appointed with the delegation of functions.

List of vice-presidents of the Meuse Departmental Council (as of 2021)
Order	Name	Party	Delegation
1st	Hélène Sigot-Lemoine	LR	Education, youth and culture
2nd	Gérard Abbas	DVD	Finances, general administration and affairs of the department
3rd	Jocelyne Antoine	DVD	Development and support of territories, cross-border, contracting and relations with the Region
4th	Serge Nahant	UDI	Roads, mobility and land development
5th	Marie-Christine Tonner	DVC	Childhood and family
6th	Stéphane Perrin	DVD	Integration, activity, employment, social and solidarity economy
7th	Isabelle Perin	SE	Tourism and sports
8th	Jean-Philippe Vautrin	DVD	Environment, ecological transition, agriculture and forestry
9th	Véronique Philippe	DVD	Autonomy
10th	Julien Didry	DVD	Attractiveness, innovation, digital and participatory democracy

== See also ==
- Meuse
- Departmental councils of France
