= Meuse's 1st constituency =

Constituency of the National Assembly of France

1st constituency of Meuse
- inline Constituency of the National Assembly of France

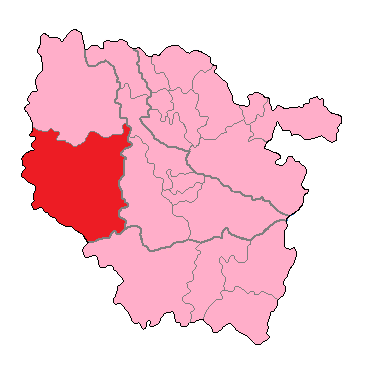
- Meuse's 1st Constituency shown within Lorraine
- Deputy: Bertrand Pancher; PRV
- Department: Meuse
- Cantons: Ancerville, Bar-le-Duc-Nord, Bar-le-Duc-Sud, Commercy, Gondrecourt-le-Château, Ligny-en-Barrois, Montiers-sur-Saulx, Pierrefitte-sur-Aire, Revigny-sur-Ornain, Saint-Mihiel, Seuil-d'Argonne, Vaubecourt, Vaucouleurs, Vavincourt, Vigneulles-lès-Hattonchâtel, Void-Vacon.
- Registered voters: 78,861

The 1st constituency of Meuse is a French legislative constituency in the Meuse département.

== Description ==
The 1st constituency of Meuse covers the southern portion of the department and includes the prefecture of Bar-le-Duc.

Since 1988 a variety of conservative parties have held the seat with the exception of 1997 when the seat was captured by François Dosé of the Socialist Party who subsequently held the seat at the 2002 French legislative election. Since 2007 Bertrand Pancher has been held the seat first for the Gaullist UMP before he swapped to the more centrist Radical Party and Union of Democrats and Independents.

== Historic Representation ==
Election	Member	Party
1986	Proportional representation – no election by constituency	
1988	Gérard Longuet	UDF
1993	André Droitcourt	UDF
1997	François Dosé	PS
2002	François Dosé	PS
2007	Bertrand Pancher	UMP
2012	Bertrand Pancher	PRV
2017	Bertrand Pancher	UDI
2022	Bertrand Pancher	PRV

== Election results ==
=== 2024 ===
Legislative Election 2024: Meuse's 1st constituency
Party	Candidate	Votes	%	±%
PS (NFP)	Olivier Guckert	7,066	14.31	−3.18
DVD	Bertrand Pancher	16,901	34.22	+4.03
LO	Blaise Tymen	481	0.97	N/A
DLF	Sylvie Mariage	708	1.43	N/A
DIV	Grégoire Moutaux	548	1.11	N/A
RN	Maxime Amblard	23,680	47.95	+17.52
Turnout		49,384	96.93	+48.40
Registered electors		74,962		
2nd round result
RN	Maxime Amblard	25,411	50.49	+2.54
DVD	Bertrand Pancher	24,918	49.51	+15.29
Turnout		50,329	96.94	−0.01
Registered electors		74,914		
RN gain from DVD				

=== 2022 ===
Legislative Election 2022: Meuse's 1st constituency
Party	Candidate	Votes	%	±%
RN	Brigitte Gaudineau	10,914	30.43	+10.25
PRV (UDC)	Bertrand Pancher	10,826	30.19	+2.37
PS (NUPÉS)	Olivier Guckert	6,272	17.49	+0.59
HOR (Ensemble)	Sandrine Raffner Kiefer	1,277	13.38	−14.06
REC	Arnaud Chapon	1,277	3.56	N/A
Others	N/A	1,778	-	−
Turnout		35,864	48.53	−1.61
2nd round result
PRV (UDC)	Bertrand Pancher	19,028	55.40	-2.85
RN	Brigitte Gaudineau	15,319	44.60	N/A
Turnout		34,347	48.08	+2.78
PRV gain from UDI				

=== 2017 ===
Candidate	Label	First round		Second round	
Candidate	Label	Votes	%	Votes	%
Bertrand Pancher	UDI	10,476	27.82	18,053	58.25
Diana André	REM	10,333	27.44	12,940	41.75
Corinne Kaufmann	FN	7,599	20.18		
Guy Jeannesson	FI	3,597	9.55		
Arnaud Mac Farlane	PS	1,616	4.29		
Jean-Marc Fleury	ECO	1,151	3.06		
Sylvie Frasez	DLF	860	2.28		
Gilles Latour	EXD	615	1.63		
Nathalie Thiébaut-Lamy	DIV	526	1.40		
Bruno Caille	REG	397	1.05		
Éric Finot	EXG	279	0.74		
Gilles Gobert	DIV	208	0.55		
Votes		37,657	100.00	30,993	100.00
Valid votes		37,657	97.17	30,993	88.52
Blank votes		820	2.12	2,751	7.86
Null votes		278	0.72	1,268	3.62
Turnout		38,755	50.14	35,012	45.30
Abstentions		38,539	49.86	42,271	54.70
Registered voters		77,294		77,283	
Source: Ministry of the Interior

=== 2012 ===
Legislative Election 2012: Meuse's 1st constituency
Party	Candidate	Votes	%	±%
PRV	Bertrand Pancher	17,489	37.31	
PS	Diana Andre	15,521	33.11	
FN	Dominique Bilde	9,179	19.58	
EELV	Jean-Marc Fleury	1,740	3.71	
FG	Mélanie Tsagouris	1,458	3.11	
Others	N/A	1,491		
Turnout		46,878	59.41	
2nd round result
PRV	Bertrand Pancher	24,667	54.68	
PS	Diana Andre	20,448	45.32	
Turnout		45,115	57.21	
PRV gain from UMP				

== Sources ==
Official results of French elections from 2002: "Résultats électoraux officiels en France" (in French).
