= Jean-Louis Dumont =

French politician

Jean-Louis Dumont (born 6 April 1944 in Jonville-en-Woëvre) is a member of the National Assembly of France. He represents the Meuse department, and is a member of the Socialiste, radical, citoyen et divers gauche.
