= Jean-Marc Varaut =

French lawyer (1933-2005)

- Born: 18 February 1933; Neuilly-sur-Seine, France
- Died: 26 May 2005 (aged 72); 15th arrondissement of Paris, France
- Occupation: Lawyer
- Children: Alexandre; Charles-Henri

Jean-Marc Varaut (French pronunciation: [ʒɑ̃maʁk vaʁo]; 18 February 1933 – 26 May 2005) was a French lawyer who was elected in 1996 a member of the Académie des Sciences Morales et Politiques.

He was the lawyer of Maurice Papon in his 1997–1998 trial, a member of Philippe Pétain's Vichy government who collaborated with the Nazis in the deportation of Jews in the Gironde department.

His son Alexandre Varaut is a Member of the European Parliament.

== Honours ==
- Knight of the Legion of Honour (1995)
