= Cantons of the Meuse department =

The following is a list of the 17 cantons of the Meuse department, in France, following the French canton reorganisation which came into effect in March 2015:

- Ancerville
- Bar-le-Duc-1
- Bar-le-Duc-2
- Belleville-sur-Meuse
- Bouligny
- Clermont-en-Argonne
- Commercy
- Dieue-sur-Meuse
- Étain
- Ligny-en-Barrois
- Montmédy
- Revigny-sur-Ornain
- Saint-Mihiel
- Stenay
- Vaucouleurs
- Verdun-1
- Verdun-2
