= Canton of Bar-le-Duc-2 =

Coordinates: 48.78°N 5.17°E

The canton of Bar-le-Duc-2 is an administrative division of the Meuse department, northeastern France. It was created at the French canton reorganisation which came into effect in March 2015. Its seat is in Bar-le-Duc.

It consists of the following communes:

1. Bar-le-Duc (partly)
2. Behonne
3. Chardogne
4. Fains-Véel
5. Vavincourt
