= Maxime Amblard =

French politician (born 1996)

Member of the French National Assembly for Meuse's 1st constituency
- Incumbent
- Assumed office 18 July 2024
- Preceded by: Bertrand Pancher

Personal details
- Born: 6 September 1996 (age 28); L'Isle-d'Espagnac, Charente
- Political party: National Rally

Maxime Amblard (born 6 September 1996) is a French engineer and politician of the National Rally. He was elected member of the National Assembly for Meuse's 1st constituency in 2024.

== Biography ==
Amblard was born in 1996 in Charente. He holds a degree in nuclear engineering from the École nationale supérieure de physique, électronique et matériaux which he completed in 2019 while working as an intern in the safety department at the Saint-Alban Nuclear Power Plant. In 2022, he published a book Abundance and Scarcity which addresses overreliance on fossil fuels and proposes nuclear energy as a solution. In an article published in 2024 for Le Journal du Dimanche Amblard criticised the government of Emmanuel Macron for weakening the French nuclear industry.

Amblard was also an activist in the French Democratic Confederation of Labour on behalf of Framatome but was reportedly excluded from it in July 2024 due to his support for the National Rally.

For the 2024 legislative elections, Amblard was selected to contest Meuse's 1st constituency for the National Rally and defeated outgoing deputy Bertrand Pancher.
