= Les Horaces (National Rally) =

Term in 21st-century French politics

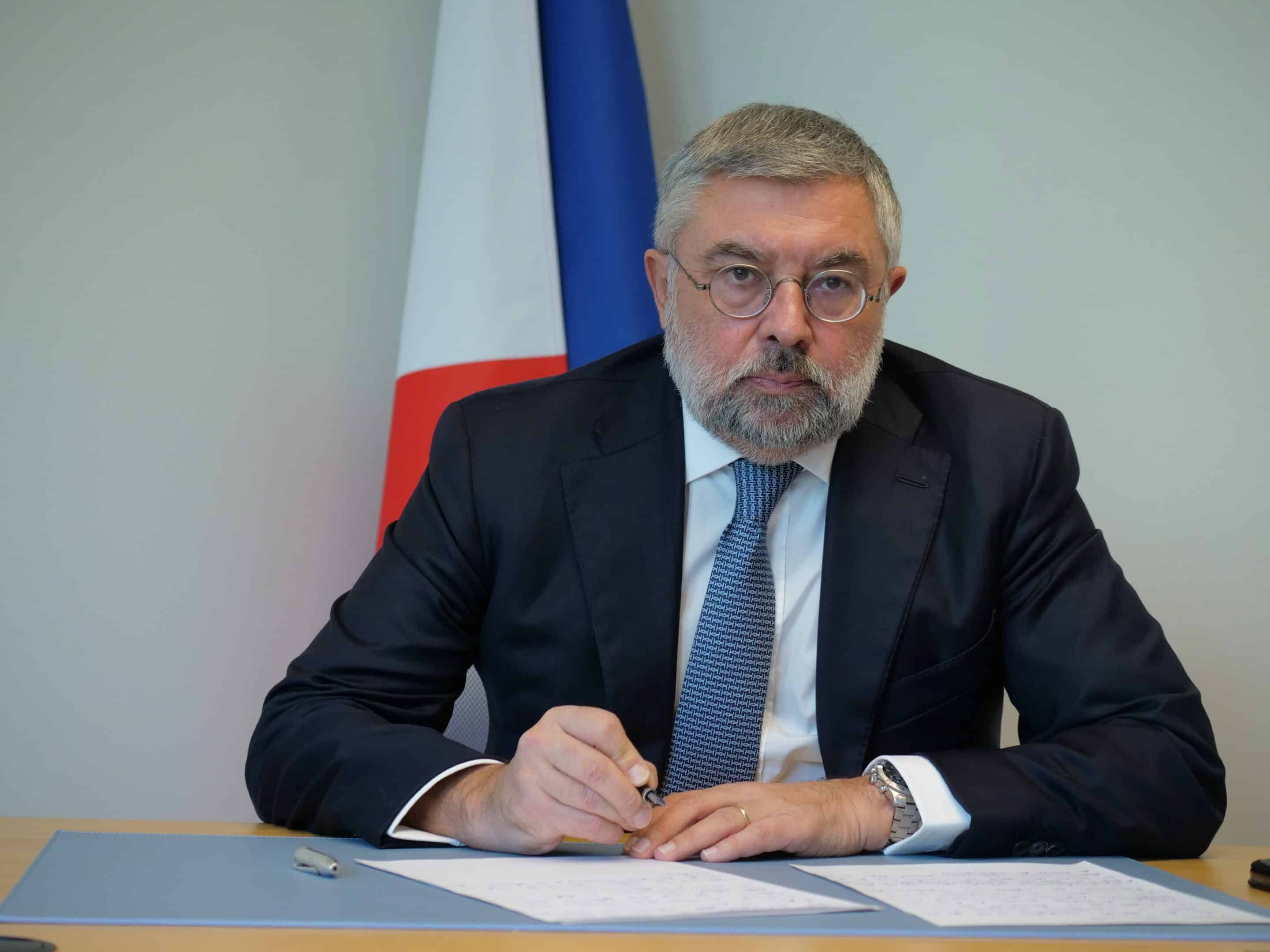
André Rougé in 2022, considered to be the leader of Les Horaces.

Les Horaces (French pronunciation: [lez‿ɔʁas]) refers to a political circle who have played a leading role in shaping the policies of the far-right National Rally in France since the mid-2010s.

== Activities ==
The circle was founded in 2015. Since then, the circle has prepared monthly briefings for National Rally leader Marine Le Pen. The circle aims to recruit senior civil servants and businessmen to the National Rally, to generate ideas for party policy, and to prepare the party for government.

== Members ==
The circle's membership is kept secret, but is considered to be led by member of the European Parliament André Rougé. In 2016, Jean Messiha was named a spokesperson for the circle.

A 2018 investigation by BuzzFeed News and Mediapart claimed that former Cour des Comptes and far-right think tank Carrefour de l'Horloge member Philippe Baccou as well as banker and Confédération des Petites et Moyennes Entreprises member Georges Tissié were members of the circle. In 2024, Libération published an investigation claiming to undercover other members of the circle. Radio France Internationale has named Jean-Paul Garraud as a member of the circle, principally working on judicial questions.

== Reception ==
Paul Quinio of Libération has described the circle as "a central piece of the far-right's strategy of dédiabolisation." Historian Andrew Hussey has described the circle as being largely composed of énarques, making it an "elite project that is ironically – or cynically, depending on how you look at it – driving Le Pen’s anti-elitist agenda."
