= Jérôme Dumont =

French politician (born 1977)

President of the Departmental Council of Meuse
- Incumbent
- Assumed office 1 July 2021
- Preceded by: Claude Léonard

Personal details
- Born: 15 March 1977 (age 49)
- Party: Independent
- Other political affiliations: Miscellaneous right

Jérôme Dumont (born 15 March 1977) is a French politician serving as president of the Departmental Council of Meuse since 2021. He was a candidate for the National Assembly in Meuse's 2nd constituency in the 2017 and 2024 legislative elections.
