= Florence Goulet =

French politician (born 1961)

Member of the National Assembly for Meuse's 2nd constituency
- Incumbent
- Assumed office 22 June 2022
- Preceded by: Émilie Cariou

Personal details
- Born: 30 June 1961 (age 65) Le Mêle-sur-Sarthe, Orne, France
- Party: National Rally (2021–present)
- Other political affiliations: Rally for the Republic (2001); Union for a Popular Movement (2001–2015); The Republicans (2015–2020)
- Spouse: André Rougé
- Relatives: Daniel Goulet (father)
- Occupation: Journalist

Florence Goulet (born 30 June 1961) is a French journalist and politician of the National Rally. Since 2022, she has represented Meuse's 2nd constituency in the National Assembly.

== Biography ==
Goulet was born and raised in Orne. She is the daughter of former deputy and senator Daniel Goulet who represented the department's constituency. Goulet trained as a journalist and reporter focusing on rural affairs before entering politics. She has also been a member of the French Alzheimer association. Her husband is MEP André Rougé.

Goulet was an activist for Rally for the Republic and its successor Union for a Popular Movement. She also worked as a parliamentary attaché for Henri Guaino and was a substitute for Philippe Senau, The Republicans candidate for the senatorial elections in Orne in 2017. She joined the National Rally in 2021 and worked as a campaign coordinator for Marine Le Pen. In 2022, she was elected to Meuse's 2nd constituency during the legislative elections held that year.
