= Meuse (department) =

Department of France

- Department
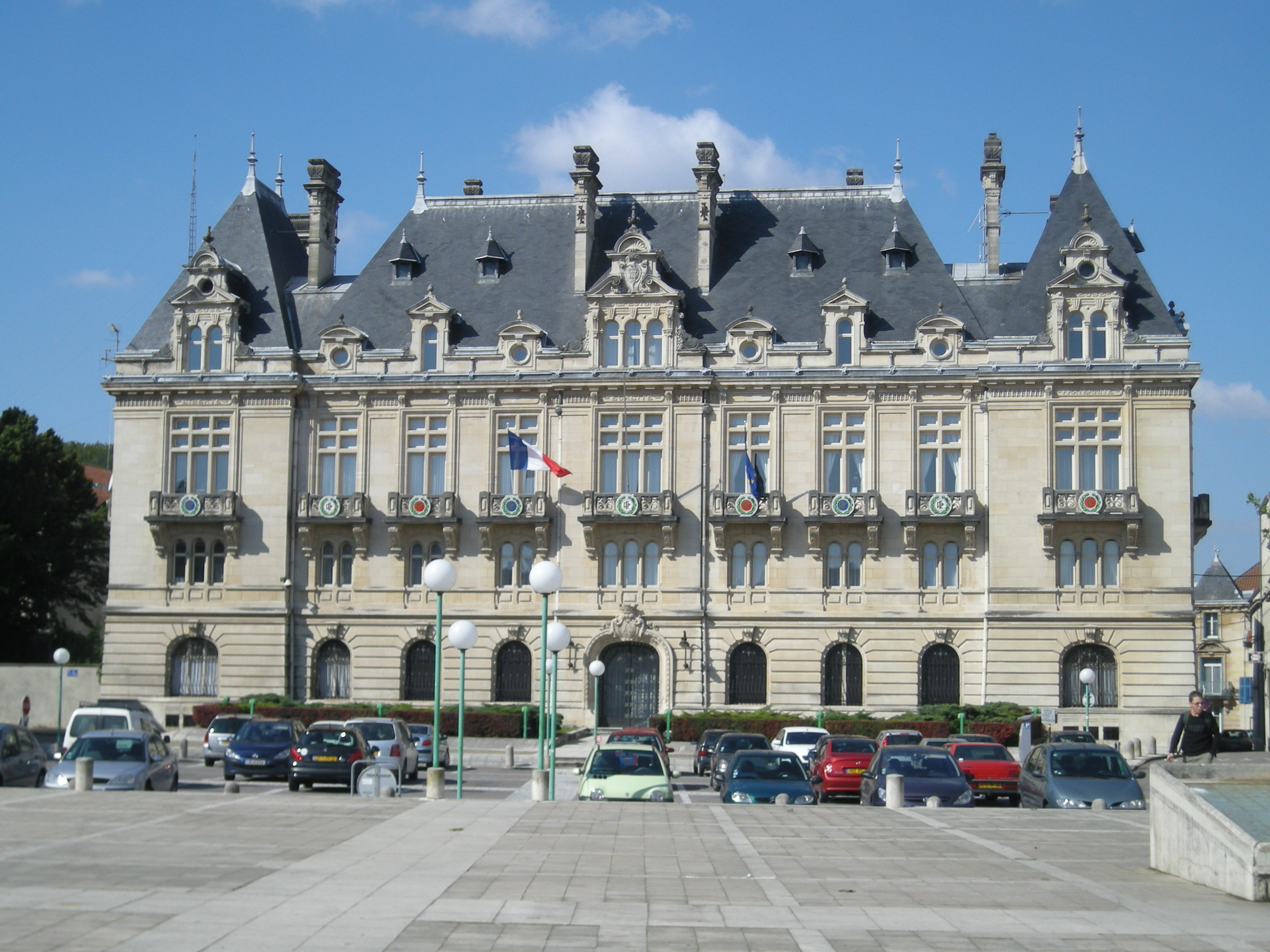
- Prefecture building of the Meuse department, in Bar-le-Duc

- Flag Coat of arms

- Location of Meuse in France
- Coordinates: 49°00′N 05°20′E
- Country: France
- Region: Grand Est
- Prefecture: Bar-le-Duc
- Subprefectures: Commercy; Verdun

Government
  - President of the Departmental Council: Jérôme Dumont (DCD)

Area^{1}
  - Total: 6,211 km^{2} (2,398 sq mi)

Population (2023)
  - Total: 180,290
  - Rank: 91st
  - Density: 29.03/km^{2} (75.18/sq mi)
- Demonym(s): Meusiens, Meusiennes
- Time zone: UTC+1 (CET)
  - Summer (DST): UTC+2 (CEST)
- ISO 3166 code: FR-55
- Department number: 55
- Largest city: Verdun
- Arrondissements: 3
- Constituency: 2
- Cantons: 17
- Intercommunality: 15
- Communes: 499
- ^1 French Land Register data, which exclude estuaries and lakes, ponds and glaciers larger than 1 km^{2}

Meuse (French pronunciation: [møz]) is a department in northeast France, named after the river Meuse. Meuse is part of the current region of Grand Est and is landlocked and borders by the French departments of Ardennes, Marne, Haute-Marne, Vosges, Meurthe-et-Moselle, and Belgium to the north. Parts of Meuse belong to the Parc naturel régional de Lorraine. It had a population of 180,290 in 2023.

Front lines in trench warfare during World War I ran varying courses through the department and it hosted an important battle/offensive in 1916 in and around Verdun. The six uninhabited communes of France (with a population of 0) are in Meuse, as testimony to the villages destroyed in the war. Their mayors are uniquely appointed by the prefect, and tasked with keeping their memory alive.

== History ==
Meuse is one of the original 83 departments created during the French Revolution on 4 March 1790, by order of the National Constituent Assembly. The new departments were to be uniformly administered and approximately equal to one another in size and population. The department was created from the former provinces of Barrois (area of Bar-le-Duc) and Three Bishoprics (area of Verdun).

From about 500 AD, the Franks controlled this part of northeastern France, and the Carolingian Empire was the last stage of their rule. The Carolingian territories were divided into three sections in 843 at the Treaty of Verdun, and the area that is now the department of Meuse became part of Middle Francia. The new ruler was Lothair I, and on his death in 855, his territory north of the Alps was passed to his second son Lothair II, after whom the hitherto nameless territory was called Lotharingia, which name eventually evolved into the modern Lorraine. Lothair II died without legitimate heirs and Lotharingia was divided into east and west parts. The king of East Francia, Louis the German, received the eastern part and Charles the Bald, king of West Francia, received the western part, which included Meuse, thus effectively establishing the medieval Kingdoms of Germany and France.

The Battle of Sedan was fought in the western part of the department during the Franco-Prussian War in 1870. It resulted in the capture of the Emperor Napoleon III and large numbers of his troops and effectively decided the war in favour of Prussia and its allies. The area was again a battleground in World War I when the Battle of Verdun was fought in 1916. In the Second World War it again saw action in another battle when the Germans sought to establish a base from which to capture the Meuse bridges and cross the river.

== Geography ==
Meuse is a department in northeastern France and is part of the region of Grand Est. The capital and largest town in the department is Bar-le-Duc, and other large towns are Commercy and Verdun. The northern edge of the department is on the border with Belgium, to the east lies the department of Meurthe-et-Moselle, to the south lies Vosges, to the southwest lies Haute-Marne, to the west lies Marne and to the northwest, Ardennes. The main rivers flowing through the department are the River Meuse, the Aire and the Chiers. A ridge running from south to north separates the watersheds of the Seine and the Rhine. These hills are called the Argonne and are clothed in oak forests. The area of the department is 2,408 mi^{2} (6,237 km^{2}).

The total land area of the department is 1,539,700 acres (623,100 ha), and of this, 830,000 acres (340,000 ha) are cultivated for arable crops, 120,000 acres (49,000 ha) are grassland, 440,000 acres (180,000 ha) are woods and forests and 35,000 acres (14,000 ha) are cultivated for the production of grapes. The principal crops grown are wheat, barley and oats, potatoes, oilseed rape, vegetables and fruit. Livestock is raised and timber is extracted from the forests. The main industries are brewing and the manufacture of glass and tiles. Lace-making is a traditional craft in the department.

Part of the department is in Lorraine Regional Natural Park, a stretch of pastoral countryside stretching eastward from Metz and Nancy and spanning three departments. The park has many natural habitats including calcareous grassland, forested valleys, wet meadows, ponds and streams. There are many Natura 2000 protected areas and it is an important resting area for migratory birds. Among the different habitats it includes a stretch of coast, the plain of Woëvre, the Lac de Madine, the Meuse valley and the Hague plateau. The total area of the park is 205,000 hectares (510,000 acres). It has a very short border with Belgium.

Since 2007 Meuse has been served by Meuse TGV station on the LGV Est between Paris and Strasbourg.

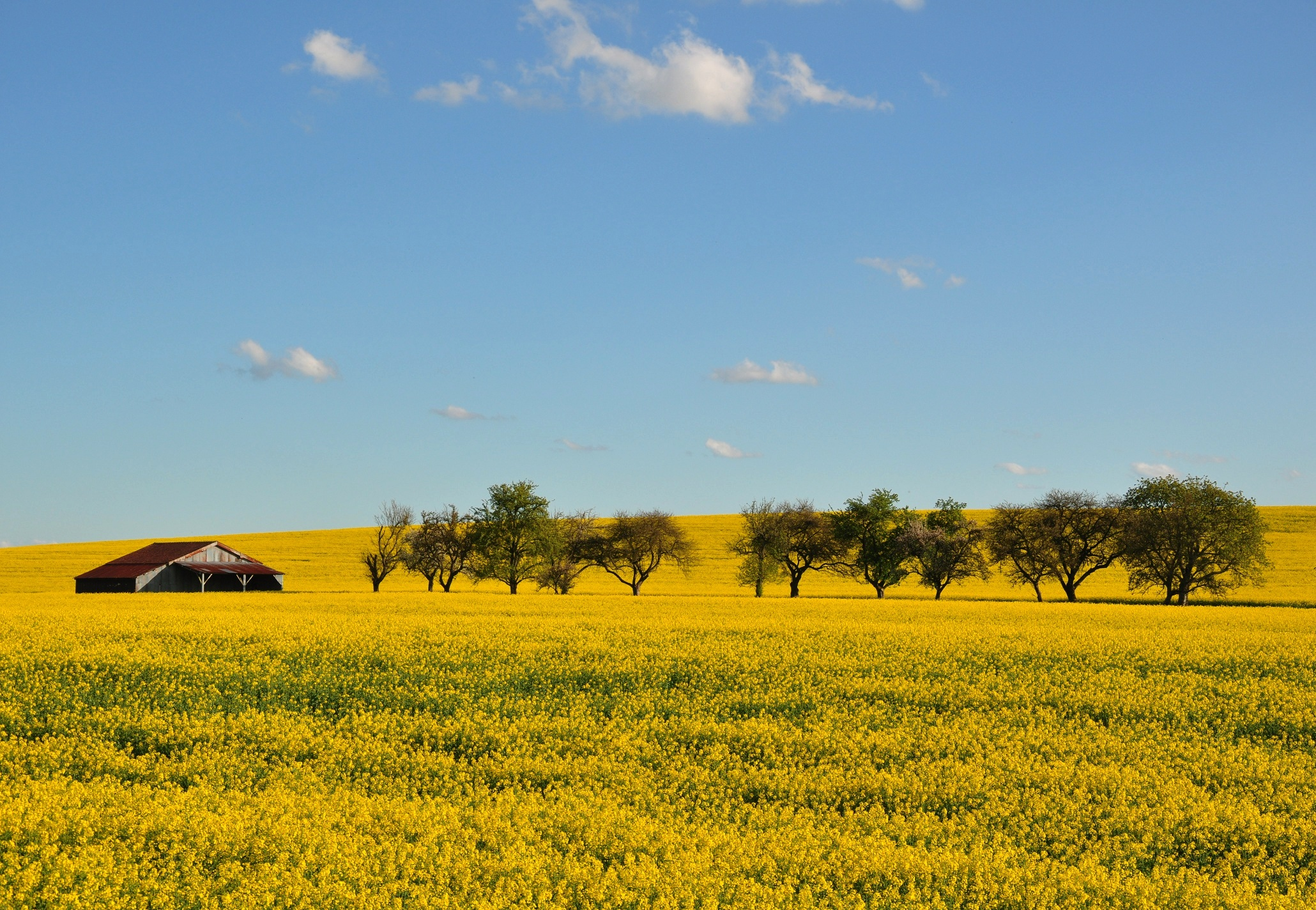
Spring in Meuse

== Demographics ==
Historical population

Year	Pop.	±% p.a.
1801	269,522	—
1806	284,703	+1.10%
1821	291,385	+0.15%
1831	314,588	+0.77%
1841	326,372	+0.37%
1851	328,657	+0.07%
1861	305,540	−0.73%
1872	284,725	−0.64%
1881	289,861	+0.20%
1891	292,253	+0.08%
1901	283,480	−0.30%
1911	277,955	−0.20%
1921	207,309	−2.89%
1931	215,819	+0.40%

Year	Pop.	±% p.a.
1936	216,934	+0.10%
1946	188,786	−1.38%
1954	207,106	+1.16%
1962	215,985	+0.53%
1968	209,372	−0.52%
1975	203,799	−0.38%
1982	199,983	−0.27%
1990	196,223	−0.24%
1999	192,198	−0.23%
2007	193,962	+0.11%
2012	192,800	−0.12%
2017	187,187	−0.59%
2023	180,290	−0.62%

Since the mid-19th century, the exodus of the countryside inhabitants to the cities has caused the population of rural France to fall. Meuse has no big cities to receive population and the total population of the department has thus decreased. It reached 328,657 inhabitants in 1851, with a population density of 52.9, but had fallen to 277,955 by 1911. Meuse experienced the greatest proportional population decline in French departments in just ten years, from 278,000 inhabitants in 1911 into just 207,000 in 1921.

The First World War dealt a heavy blow to the department, and by 1921, only 207,309 inhabitants were recorded. Many residents had fled, and entire villages that were on or near the front line in 1916 were destroyed. Meuse thus has several uninhabited communes because the villages were never rebuilt, and in fact are known as Morts pour la France ("Died for France"); the number of displaced persons from the villages varies from 131 to 718. Since the end of the Battle of Verdun in 1916, these communes have been unoccupied with an official population of zero; the villages are Beaumont-en-Verdunois, Bezonvaux, Cumières-le-Mort-Homme, Fleury-devant-Douaumont, Haumont-près-Samogneux and Louvemont-Côte-du-Poivre. In the later part of the 20th century the number of inhabitants in the department varied little but eventually fell below 200,000 inhabitants in the 1980s.

Because of its low population density Meuse is considered to fall within the empty diagonal.

=== Principal towns ===
The most populous commune is Verdun; the prefecture, Bar-le-Duc, is the second-most populous. As of 2023, there are 8 communes with more than 3,000 inhabitants:

Commune	Population (2023)
Verdun	16,890
Bar-le-Duc	14,607
Commercy	5,350
Saint-Mihiel	3,772
Ligny-en-Barrois	3,677
Étain	3,375
Thierville-sur-Meuse	3,172
Belleville-sur-Meuse	3,013

== Politics ==
The president of the Departmental Council of Meuse is Jérôme Dumont (DVD), first elected in 2021.

=== Presidential elections (2nd round) results since 1995 ===
Election	Winning candidate	Party	%	2nd place candidate	Party	%
2022	Emmanuel Macron	LREM	44.39	Marine Le Pen	RN	55.61
2017	Emmanuel Macron	LREM	51.62	Marine Le Pen	FN	48.38
2012	Nicolas Sarkozy	UMP	53.80	François Hollande	PS	46.20
2007	Nicolas Sarkozy	UMP	56.93	Ségolène Royal	PS	43.07
2002	Jacques Chirac	RPR	78.22	Jean-Marie Le Pen	FN	21.78
1995	Jacques Chirac	RPR	52.29	Lionel Jospin	PS	47.71

=== Representation in Paris ===
==== In the National Assembly ====
Constituency	Member	Party
Meuse's 1st	Maxime Amblard	RN
Meuse's 2nd	Florence Goulet	RN

==== In the Senate ====
Senator	Party	Since
Franck Menonville	UDI	2017
Jocelyne Antoine	DVD	2023

== Tourism ==
The European Beer Museum (Musée européen de la Bière) in Stenay, founded in 1986, is considered the largest of its kind on the continent.

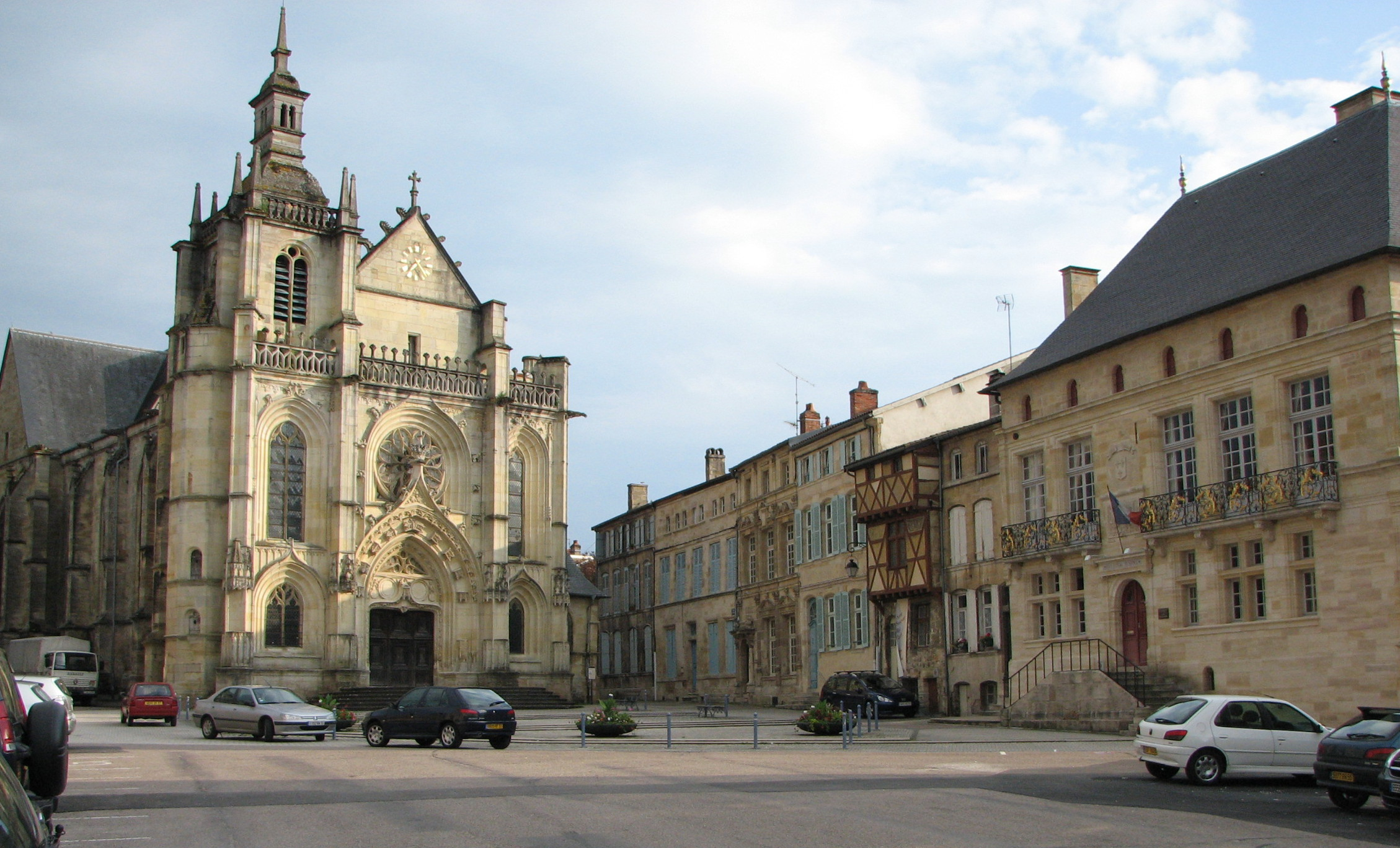
Bar-le-Duc

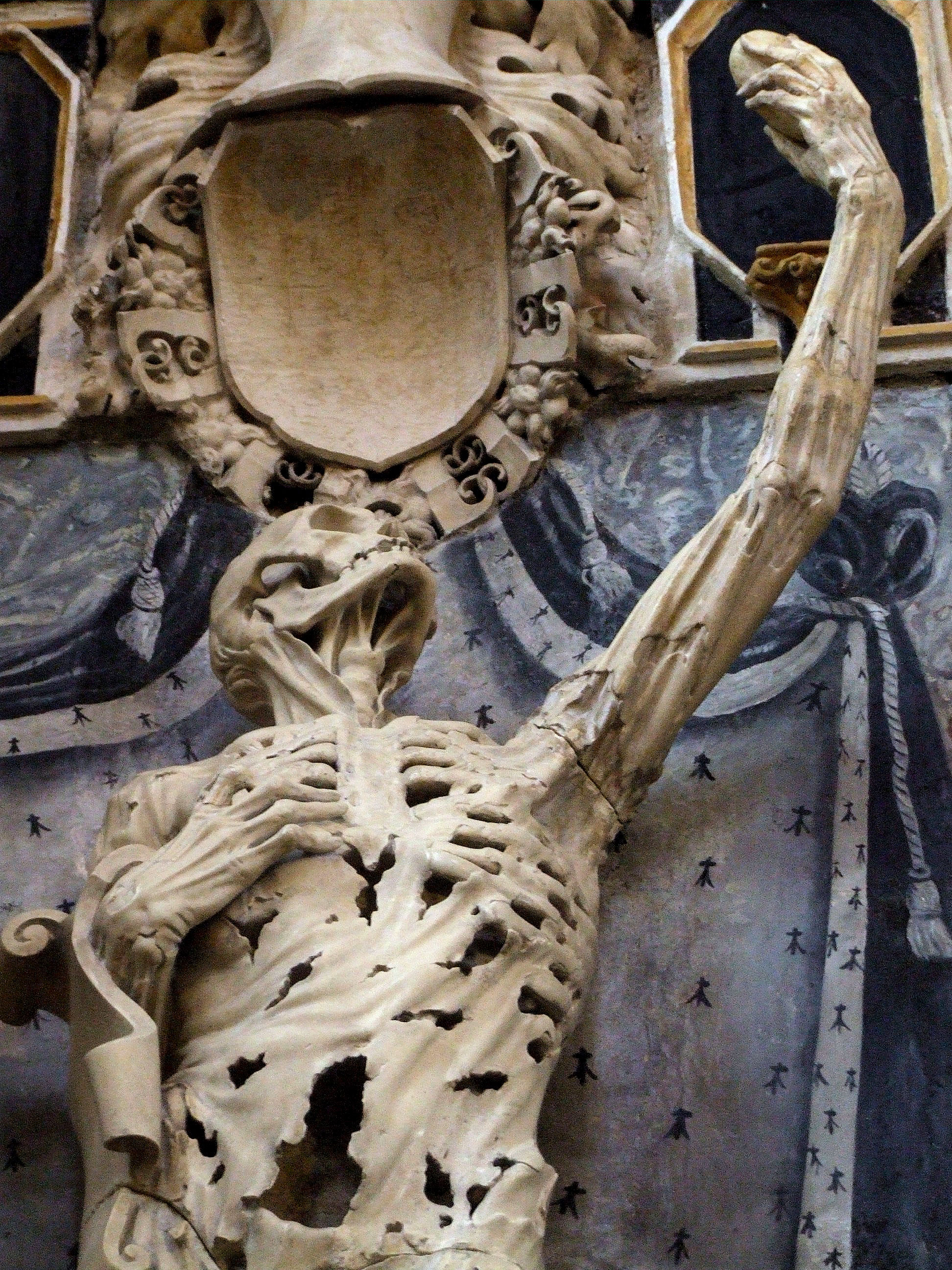
Le Transi de René de Chalon by Ligier Richier in Bar-le-Duc

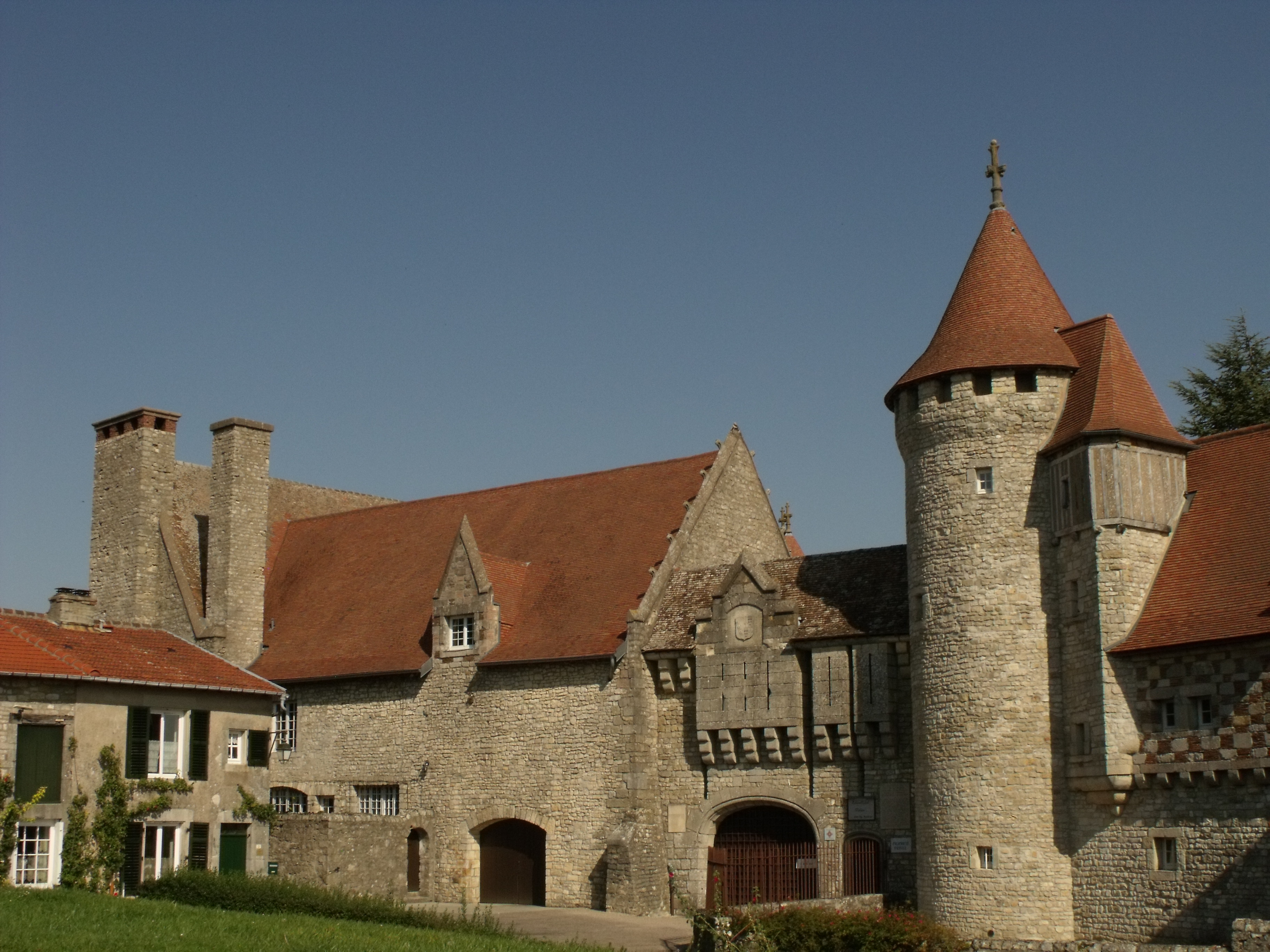
Château de Hattonchâtel

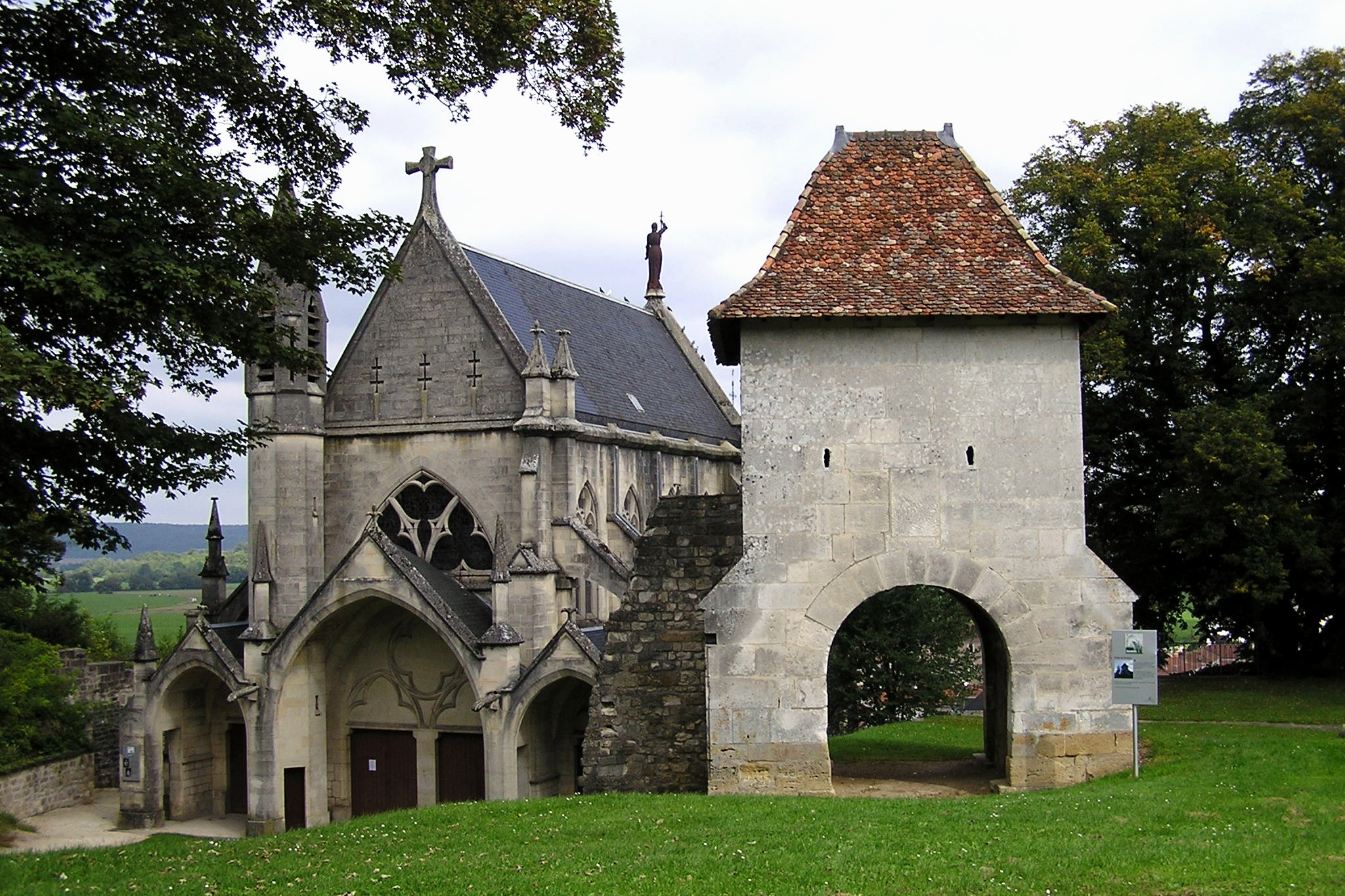
Chapel of Vaucouleurs

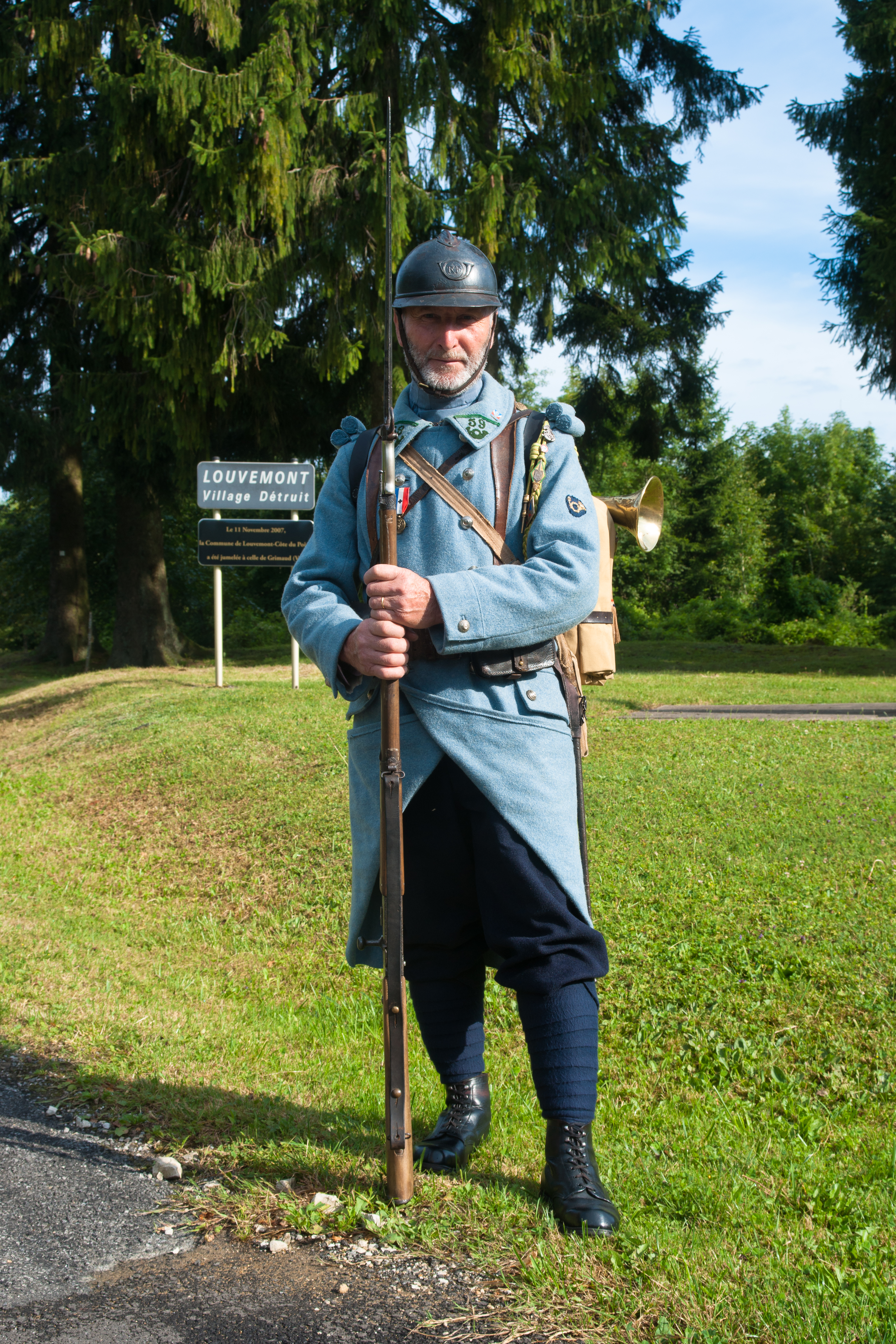
Historical reenactment near the Verdun battlefield

== See also ==
- Arrondissements of the Meuse department
- Cantons of the Meuse department
- Communes of the Meuse department
- Departmental Council of Meuse
- Zone rouge
