= 2024 French legislative election in Ardennes =

Following the first round of the 2024 French legislative election on 30 June 2024, runoff elections in each constituency where no candidate received a vote share greater than 50 percent were scheduled for 7 July. Candidates permitted to stand in the runoff elections needed to either come in first or second place in the first round or achieve more than 12.5 percent of the votes of the entire electorate (as opposed to 12.5 percent of the vote share due to low turnout).

== Ardennes ==
=== 1st constituency ===
Candidate	Party or alliance		First round		Second round	
Candidate	Party or alliance		Votes	%	Votes	%
Flavien Termet	National Rally		17,817	38.33	24,184	52.99
Lionel Vuibert	Ensemble	Renaissance	12,157	26.16	21,458	47.01
Damien Lerouge	New Popular Front	Socialist Party	8,127	17.48		
Christian Charvet	Far-right	Independent	4,257	9.16		
Sabine Misset	The Republicans		1,782	3.83		
Arnaud Rennesson	Independent		998	2.15		
Sonia D'Orgeville	Ecologists	Independent	956	2.06		
Nadia Octave	Far-left	Lutte Ouvrière	386	0.83		
Total			46,480	100.00	45,642	100.00
Valid votes			46,480	97.75	45,642	95.69
Invalid votes			411	0.86	533	1.12
Blank votes			660	1.39	1,524	3.20
Total votes			47,551	100.00	47,699	100.00
Registered voters/turnout			70,664	67.29	70,667	67.50

=== 2nd constituency ===
Candidate	Party or alliance		First round		Second round	
Candidate	Party or alliance		Votes	%	Votes	%
Pauline Mester	National Rally		15,097	40.83	16,280	35.63
Pierre Cordier	Miscellaneous right	The Republicans	11,147	30.15	29,415	64.37
Gilles Loyez	New Popular Front	La France Insoumise	6,688	18.09		
Philippe Mathot	Ensemble	Renaissance	3,467	9.38		
Mink Takawe	Far-left	Lutte Ouvrière	308	0.83		
Patrick Benyoucef	Far-left	Independent	264	0.71		
Total			36,971	100.00	45,695	100.00
Valid votes			36,971	98.41	45,695	97.48
Invalid votes			223	0.59	326	0.70
Blank votes			375	1.00	853	1.82
Total votes			37,569	100.00	46,874	100.00
Registered voters/turnout			60,281	62.32	60,275	77.77

=== 3rd constituency ===
Candidate	Party or alliance		First round		Second round	
Candidate	Party or alliance		Votes	%	Votes	%
Jean-Luc Warsmann	Miscellaneous right	Independent	15,362	43.56	19,506	54.44
Isabelle Roger	National Rally		15,296	43.38	16,321	45.56
Sophie Perrin	New Popular Front	La France Insoumise	4,139	11.74		
Laurie Augier	Far-left	Lutte Ouvrière	466	1.32		
Total			35,263	100.00	35,827	100.00
Valid votes			35,263	98.31	35,827	97.90
Invalid votes			258	0.72	250	0.68
Blank votes			349	0.97	519	1.42
Total votes			35,870	100.00	36,596	100.00
Registered voters/turnout			54,484	65.84	54,491	67.16
