= 2024 French legislative election in Eure =

Following the first round of the 2024 French legislative election on 30 June 2024, runoff elections in each constituency where no candidate received a vote share greater than 50 percent were scheduled for 7 July. Candidates permitted to stand in the runoff elections needed to either come in first or second place in the first round or achieve more than 12.5 percent of the votes of the entire electorate (as opposed to 12.5 percent of the vote share due to low turnout).

== Eure ==
=== 1st constituency ===
Candidate	Party or alliance		First round		Second round	
Candidate	Party or alliance		Votes	%	Votes	%
Christine Loir	National Rally		25,853	46.54	27,891	50.83
Julien Canin	Ensemble	Renaissance	15,837	28.51	26,984	49.17
Christine Le Bonté	New Popular Front	Socialist Party	11,991	21.58		
Anne Ducamp	Far-left	Lutte Ouvrière	1,009	1.82		
Jacques Thalmann	Reconquête		866	1.56		
Total			55,556	100.00	54,875	100.00
Valid votes			55,556	97.04	54,875	95.51
Invalid votes			473	0.83	568	0.99
Blank votes			1,220	2.13	2,010	3.50
Total votes			57,249	100.00	57,453	100.00
Registered voters/turnout			87,391	65.51	87,406	65.73

=== 2nd constituency ===
Candidate	Party or alliance		First round		Second round	
Candidate	Party or alliance		Votes	%	Votes	%
Katiana Levavasseur	National Rally		22,952	43.61	26,898	54.36
Timour Veyri	New Popular Front	Socialist Party	11,185	21.25	22,579	45.64
Isabelle Collin	Ensemble	Horizons	9,225	17.53		
Stéphanie Auger	Miscellaneous right	Independent	6,202	11.78		
Edouard Baude	Miscellaneous right	Horizons (Note: Dissident who ran without the backing of Ensemble)	1,658	3.15		
Mélanie Peyraud	Far-left	Lutte Ouvrière	614	1.17		
Laurence Brély	Reconquête		558	1.06		
Laure Anne Godard	Miscellaneous centre	Independent	242	0.46		
Total			52,636	100.00	49,477	100.00
Valid votes			52,636	97.35	49,477	91.92
Invalid votes			338	0.63	890	1.65
Blank votes			1,095	2.03	3,458	6.42
Total votes			54,069	100.00	53,825	100.00
Registered voters/turnout			79,112	68.34	79,125	68.03

=== 3rd constituency ===
Candidate	Party or alliance		First round		Second round	
Candidate	Party or alliance		Votes	%	Votes	%
Kévin Mauvieux	National Rally		28,012	48.88	31,417	56.80
Marie Tamarelle-Verhaeghe	Ensemble	Renaissance	12,238	21.35	23,891	43.20
Jean-Christophe Turpin	New Popular Front	La France Insoumise	9,147	15.96		
Thomas Elexhauser	Miscellaneous centre	Independent	6,259	10.92		
Marie-Noëlle Huard	Far-left	Lutte Ouvrière	963	1.68		
Didier Daric	Reconquête		691	1.21		
Total			57,310	100.00	55,308	100.00
Valid votes			57,310	97.36	55,308	94.16
Invalid votes			383	0.65	784	1.33
Blank votes			1,170	1.99	2,647	4.51
Total votes			58,863	100.00	58,739	100.00
Registered voters/turnout			85,635	68.74	85,653	68.58

=== 4th constituency ===
Candidate	Party or alliance		First round		Second round	
Candidate	Party or alliance		Votes	%	Votes	%
Patrice Pauper	National Rally		25,691	41.64	28,495	47.17
Philippe Brun	New Popular Front	Socialist Party	21,144	34.27	31,914	52.83
Anne Terlez	Ensemble	Democratic Movement	10,767	17.45		
Olivier Istin	Miscellaneous centre		2,868	4.65		
Christophe Solal	Far-left	Lutte Ouvrière	536	0.87		
Stacy Blondel	Reconquête		693	1.12		
Total			61,699	100.00	60,409	100.00
Valid votes			61,699	97.76	60,409	95.01
Invalid votes			349	0.55	654	1.03
Blank votes			1,065	1.69	2,516	3.96
Total votes			63,113	100.00	63,579	100.00
Registered voters/turnout			93,502	67.50	93,488	68.01

=== 5th constituency ===
Candidate	Party or alliance		First round		Second round	
Candidate	Party or alliance		Votes	%	Votes	%
Timothée Houssin	National Rally		26,603	45.26	29,338	51.14
Frédéric Duché	Ensemble	Horizons	14,333	24.39	28,033	48.86
Pierre-Yves Jourdain	New Popular Front	The Ecologists	12,506	21.28		
David Daverton	The Republicans		3,233	5.50		
Christian Mazure	Miscellaneous right	Independent	911	1.55		
Delphine Blitman	Far-left	Lutte Ouvrière	671	1.14		
Ludovic Beaujouan	Independent		517	0.88		
Colin Prévoteau du Clary	Sovereigntist right	Miscellaneous right	2	0.00		
Total			58,776	100.00	57,371	100.00
Valid votes			58,776	97.65	57,371	95.39
Invalid votes			357	0.59	625	1.04
Blank votes			1,060	1.76	2,145	3.57
Total votes			60,193	100.00	60,141	100.00
Registered voters/turnout			89,810	67.02	89,826	66.95
