= Bérengère Poletti =

French politician

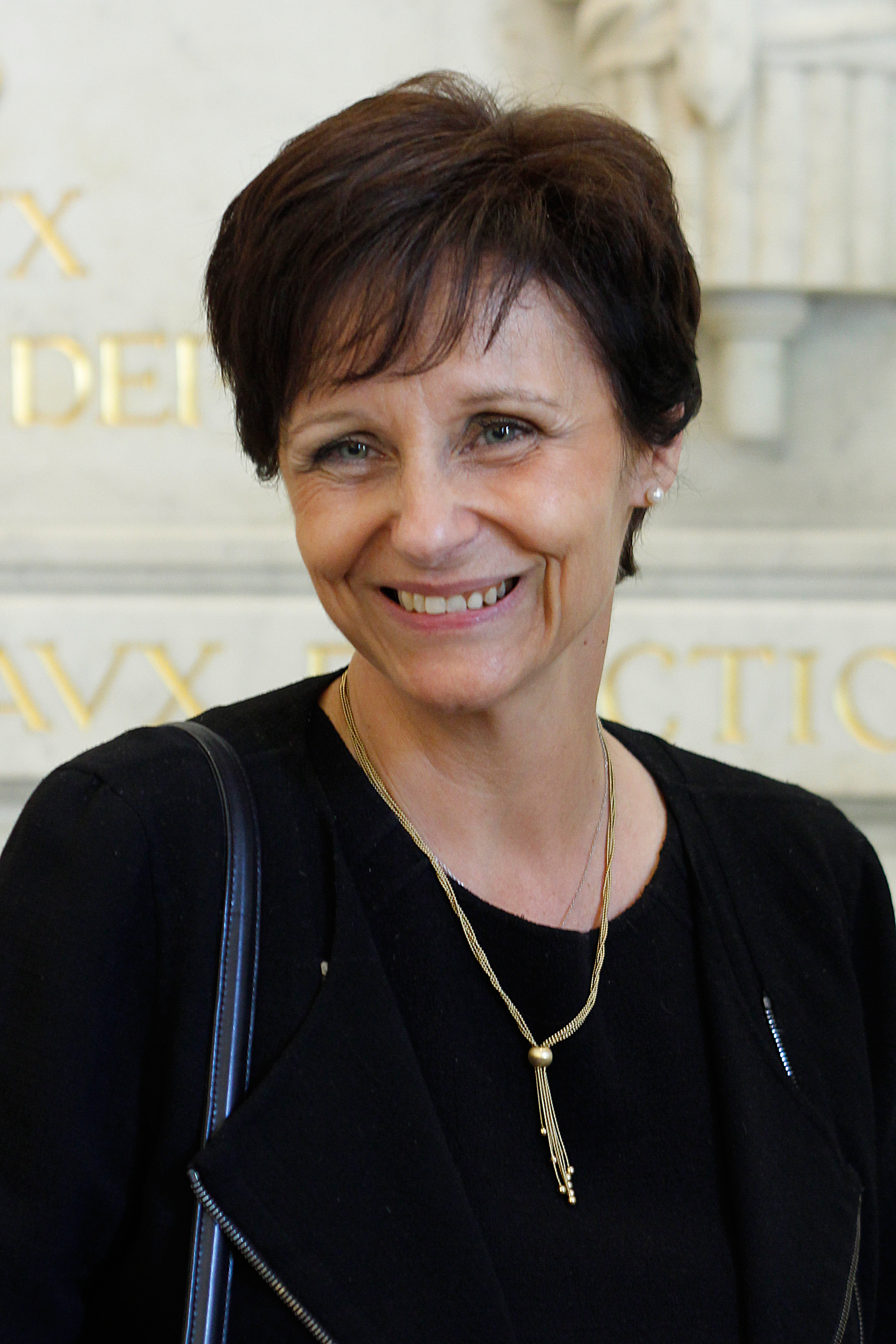

Member of the French National Assembly for Ardennes's 1st constituency
- In office 19 June 2002 – 19 June 2022
- Preceded by: Claudine Ledoux
- Succeeded by: Lionel Vuibert

Member of the Departmental council of Ardennes for Canton of Château-Porcien
- Incumbent
- Assumed office 29 March 2015

Member of the Regional council of Champagne-Ardenne
- In office 21 March 1998 – March 2015

Vice President of the Regional council of Champagne-Ardenne
- In office 21 March 1998 – 28 March 2004

Member of the Municipal council of Charleville-Mézières
- In office 19 September 1995 – 1 July 2002

Personal details
- Born: 14 October 1959 (age 66) Biencourt-sur-Orge, France
- Party: LR
- Education: University of Reims Champagne-Ardenne
- Occupation: Midwife

Bérengère Poletti (born 14 October 1959 in Biencourt-sur-Orge) is a French politician who served as a member of the National Assembly of France from 2002 to 2022, representing the 1st constituency of the Ardennes département, and is a member of the Republicans.

== Political career ==
=== Career in local politics ===
In 1995, Poletti entered politics by being elected municipal councillor (RPR) of Charleville-Mézières on the list of opposition led by Philippe Mathot (UDF-PR). She became regional councilor of Champagne-Ardenne in 2002 on the list led by Jean-Claude Étienne (RPR-UDF). She was vice-president of the regional council of Champagne-Ardenne between 1998 and 2004.

In 2008, as candidate in the municipal elections of Charleville-Mézières, Poletti lost in the second round, against Claudine Ledoux.

In March 2015, she was elected county councilor of Château-Porcien in tandem with Renaud Averly. She becomes the 8th vice-president of the Departmental council and resigns from her mandate of regional councilor.

On 8 January 2016 Poletti was appointed Secretary in charge of professional federations, of the Republicans. In September 2016, Poletti was named spokesperson of the Republicans.

=== Member of the National Assembly ===
Poletti was elected member of parliament on 16 June 2002, in the 1st constituency of the Ardennes. She is reelected with 59.58% of the votes in the second round in the same constituency on 17 June 2007 against the socialist candidate Claudine Ledoux. She has since been reelected on 17 June 2012 and on 18 June 2017.

In the 15th legislature of the French Fifth Republic, Polette served on the Committee on Foreign Affairs, where she was a secretary. She also chaired the France-Netherlands Parliamentary Friendship Group.

In addition to her committee assignments, Poletti was a member of the French delegation to the Parliamentary Assembly of the Council of Europe from 2017 to 2022. In this capacity, she served on the Committee on Social Affairs, Health and Sustainable Development and its Sub-Committee on Gender Equality.

On 1 March 2022, Poletti announced she would not be seeking re-election at the upcoming parliamentary election. She will retire after 20 years in Parliament.

== Other activities ==
- French Development Agency (AFD), Alternate Member of the Supervisory Board

== Political positions ==
In November 2011, Poletti filed a draft law allowing better access to contraception, especially for minors, and to voluntary termination of pregnancy. In 2014, she tabled a law proposal to strengthen the control of sick leave and reintroduce the day of absence in the public service; and she's writing a report on home-based jobs.

In the Republicans’ 2016 presidential primaries, Poletti endorsed Bruno Le Maire as the party's candidate for the office of President of France.

In July 2019, Poletti voted against the French ratification of the European Union’s Comprehensive Economic and Trade Agreement (CETA) with Canada.

Ahead of the 2022 presidential elections, Poletti publicly declared her support for Michel Barnier as the Republicans’ candidate.
