= Guy Lefrand =

French politician (born 1963)

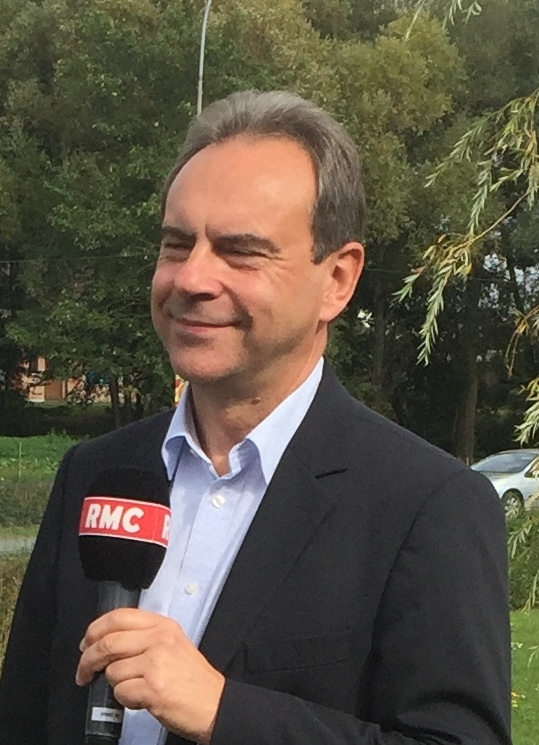
- Lefrand in 2017

Mayor of Évreux
- Incumbent
- Assumed office 5 April 2014
- Preceded by: Michel Champredon

Member of the National Assembly for Eure's 1st constituency
- In office 18 June 2017 – 20 June 2017
- Preceded by: Bruno Le Maire
- Succeeded by: Bruno Le Maire
- In office 13 January 2009 – 16 June 2012
- Preceded by: Bruno Le Maire
- Succeeded by: Bruno Le Maire

Personal details
- Born: Guy Georges Camille Lefrand; 11 March 1963 (age 63) Caen, France
- Party: Miscellaneous right (2024–present)
- Other political affiliations: Rally for the Republic (1997–2002); Union for a Popular Movement (2002–2015); The Republicans (2015–2024)
- Occupation: Physician

Guy Georges Camille Lefrand (French pronunciation: [ɡi ləfʁɑ̃]; born 11 March 1963) is a French politician who has served as Mayor of Évreux since 2014. He represented the 1st constituency of Eure in the National Assembly from 2009 to 2012, and again briefly in 2017, both times as Bruno Le Maire's substitute. He was a member of The Republicans (LR) until he left the party amid the 2024 The Republicans alliance crisis.

A physician by occupation, Lefrand started his political career in 2001 as Deputy Mayor of Évreux under Mayor Jean-Louis Debré, a position he held until 2008. Since 2016, he has also held one of the Regional Council of Normandy's vice presidencies under the presidency of Hervé Morin.
