= Ardennes's 2nd constituency =

Constituency of the National Assembly of France

2nd constituency of Ardennes
- inline Constituency of the National Assembly of France

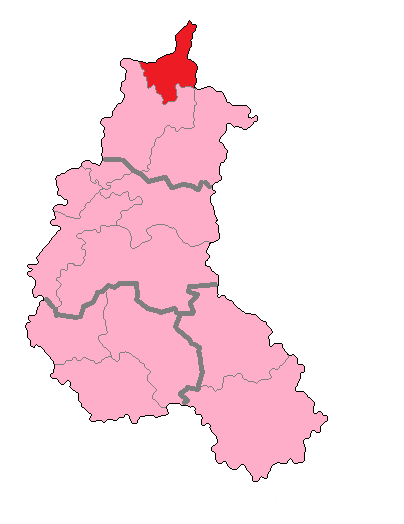
- Ardennes' 2nd Constituency shown within Champagne-Ardenne
- Deputy: Pierre Cordier; DVD
- Department: Ardennes
- Cantons: Charleville-La Houillère, Fumay, Givet, Mézières-Centre-Ouest, Monthermé, Nouzonville, Renwez, Revin, Rocroi
- Registered voters: 65,105

The 2nd constituency of the Ardennes is a French legislative constituency in the Ardennes département. As of 2024 it was represented by centre-right politician Pierre Cordier.

== Description ==
It is located in the northern corner of the Department at the Belgian border, and cuts the town of Charleville-Mézières in two, along with the Ardennes' 1st constituency.

== Deputies ==
Election	Member	Party
1958	Maurice Blin	MRP
1962	Jean Le Gall	UNR
1967	André Lebon	FGDS
1968	André Lebon	FGDS
1973	André Lebon	FGDS
1978	René Visse	PCF
1981	Gérard Istace	PS
1986	Proportional representation - no election by constituency	
1988	Gérard Istace	PS
1993	Philippe Mathot	UDF
1997	Philippe Vuilque	PS
2002	Philippe Vuilque	PS
2007	Philippe Vuilque	PS
2012	Christophe Leonard	PS
2017	Pierre Cordier	LR
2022	Pierre Cordier	DVD
2024	Pierre Cordier	LR

== Election results ==
=== 2024 ===
Candidate	Party	Alliance	First round		Second round	
Candidate	Party	Alliance	Votes	%	Votes	%
Pierre Cordier	LR		11,147	30.15	20,415	55.63
Pauline Mester	RN		15,097	40.83	16,280	44.37
Gilles Loyez	LFI	NPF	6,688	18.09		
Philippe Mathot	REN	Ensemble	3,467	9.38		
Mink Takawe	LO		308	0.83		
Patrick Benyoucef	DIV		264	0.71		
Valid votes			36,971	98.41	36,695	96.89
Blank votes			375	1.00	853	2.25
Null votes			223	0.59	326	0.86
Turnout			37,569	62.32	37,874	62.84
Abstentions			22,712	37.68	22,401	37.16
Registered voters			60,281		60,275	
Result			LR GAIN FROM DVD			

=== 2022 ===
Legislative Election 2022: Ardennes's 2nd constituency
Party	Candidate	Votes	%	±%
DVD (UDC)	Pierre Cordier	10,685	40.98	+15.12
RN	Baptiste Philippo	5,485	21.04	+1.59
LFI (NUPÉS)	Gilles Loyez	4,970	19.06	−10.31
LREM (Ensemble)	Polina Beddelem	3,309	12.69	−9.79
REC	Nadege Jacquemart	682	2.62	N/A
Others	N/A	940	3.61	
Turnout		26,071	43.55	−0.84
2nd round result
DVD (UDC)	Pierre Cordier	15,977	69.39	+8.34
RN	Baptiste Philippo	7,049	30.61	N/A
Turnout		23,026	40.22	+1.87
DVD gain from LR				

=== 2017 ===
Candidate	Label	First round		Second round	
Candidate	Label	Votes	%	Votes	%
Pierre Cordier	LR	7,212	25.86	13,371	61.05
Mario Iglesias	REM	6,269	22.48	8,530	38.95
Guillaume Luczka	FN	5,424	19.45		
Christophe Léonard	PS	4,612	16.54		
Michel Cartiaux	FI	2,971	10.65		
Igor Nivelet	PCF	609	2.18		
Jean Pierrard	ECO	397	1.42		
Mink Takawé	EXG	237	0.85		
Laurence Cahagne	DIV	154	0.55		
Votes		27,885	100.00	21,901	100.00
Valid votes		27,885	98.33	21,901	89.41
Blank votes		311	1.10	1,724	7.04
Null votes		163	0.57	870	3.55
Turnout		28,359	44.39	24,495	38.35
Abstentions		35,523	55.61	39,385	61.65
Registered voters		63,882		63,880	
Source: Ministry of the Interior

=== 2012 ===
Summary of the 10 June and 17 June 2012 French legislative in Ardennes’ 2nd Constituency election results
Candidate	Party		1st round		2nd round	
Candidate	Party		Votes	%	Votes	%
Christophe Leonard	Socialist Party	PS	10,586	30.41%	18,469	53.63%
Boris Ravignon	Union for a Popular Movement	UMP	10,373	29.80%	15,970	46.37%
Benoît Girand	National Front	FN	5,639	16.20%		
Philippe Vuilque	Miscellaneous Left	DVG	4,720	13.56%		
Michèle Leflon	Left Front	FG	1,913	5.50%		
Sylvain Baumel	The Greens	VEC	715	2.05%		
Alain Sutter	New Centre-Presidential Majority	NCE	376	1.08%		
Mink Takawe	Far Left	EXG	175	0.50%		
Jean Pierrard	Ecologist	ECO	158	0.45%		
Claire Combis	Radical Party	PRV	153	0.44%		
Total			34,808	100%	34,439	100%
Registered voters			64,802		65,105	
Blank/Void ballots			439	1.25%	1,025	2.89%
Turnout			35,247	54.39%	35,464	54.47%
Abstentions			29,555	45.61%	29,641	45.53%
Result					PS HOLD	

=== 2007 ===
Summary of the 10 June and 17 June 2007 French legislative in Ardennes’ 2nd Constituency election results
Candidate	Party		1st round		2nd round	
Candidate	Party		Votes	%	Votes	%
Philippe Vuilque	Socialist Party	PS	13,774	37.33%	20,363	51.48%
Boris Ravignon	Union for a Popular Movement	UMP	14,889	40.35%	19,192	48.52%
Florence Richard	Democratic Movement	MoDem	2,115	5.73%		
Roland Bataille	National Front	FN	1,993	5.40%		
Michèle Leflon	Communist	COM	1,320	3.58%		
Jean-Michel Fournaise	Far Left	EXG	654	1.77%		
Mezhoura Nait-Abdelaziz	The Greens	VEC	558	1.51%		
Gérard Baudoin	Far Left	EXG	416	1.13%		
Josée Tilquin	Movement for France	MPF	379	1.03%		
Joël Nouet	Far Left	EXG	300	0.81%		
Jean-Pierre Jadon	Far Right	EXD	258	0.70%		
Abderzake Chaouchi	Divers	DIV	245	0.66%		
Total			36,901	100%	39,555	100%
Registered voters			66,252		66,233	
Blank/Void ballots			533	1.42%	856	2.12%
Turnout			37,434	56.50%	40,411	61.01%
Abstentions			28,818	43.50%	25,822	38.99%
Result					PS HOLD	

=== 2002 ===
Legislative Election 2002: Ardennes's 2nd constituency
Party	Candidate	Votes	%	±%
PS	Philippe Vuilque	13,670	36.49	
UMP	Philippe Mathot	10,890	29.07	
FN	Roland Bataille	6,167	16.46	
UDF	Thérèse Girard	1,650	4.40	
PCF	Michèle Leflon	1,600	4.27	
DVG	Patrick Martin	805	2.15	
Others	N/A	2,677		
Turnout		38,155	59.47	
2nd round result
PS	Philippe Vuilque	18,838	53.18	
UMP	Philippe Mathot	16,583	46.82	
Turnout		36,771	57.32	
PS hold				

=== 1997 ===
Legislative Election 1997: Ardennes's 2nd constituency
Party	Candidate	Votes	%	±%
UDF	Philippe Mathot	10,703	25.93	
PS	Philippe Vuilque	10,596	25.67	
FN	Michel Dierckens	8,485	20.56	
PCF	René Visse	7,137	17.29	
LV	Thérésa Lorandeau	1,777	4.31	
LO	Jean-Pierre Bourriaud	828	2.01	
Others	N/A	1,750		
Turnout		42,619	68.13	
2nd round result
PS	Philippe Vuilque	22,173	49.68	
UDF	Philippe Mathot	15,925	35.68	
FN	Michel Dierckens	6,536	14.64	
Turnout		45,750	73.15	
PS gain from UDF				

== Sources ==
- French Interior Ministry results website: "Résultats électoraux officiels en France" (in French).
