= Gérard Istace =

French politician (1935–2022)

Member of the French National Assembly
- In office 12 June 1988 – 1 April 1993
- Preceded by: constituency established
- Succeeded by: Philippe Mathot
- Constituency: Ardennes's 2nd constituency
- In office 2 July 1981 – 1 April 1986
- Preceded by: René Visse
- Succeeded by: constituency abolished
- Constituency: Ardennes's 2nd constituency

Personal details
- Born: 26 July 1935 Nouzonville, France
- Died: 21 March 2022 (aged 86) Revin, France
- Party: PS

Gérard Istace (26 July 1935 – 21 March 2022) was a French politician.

A member of the Socialist Party, he served in the National Assembly from 1981 to 1986 and again from 1988 to 1993. He died in Revin on 21 March 2022 at the age of 86.

== Biography ==
A native of the Ardennes, Gérard Istace became involved in local public life in the early 1970s. A member of the Socialist Party (France), he was elected general councilor for the canton of Revin in 1974, a position he held until 1982. In 1977, he became mayor of Revin, an industrial town known for its metalworking and manufacturing industries, and remained in this position until 1994. During his terms in office, the municipality underwent urban development and the implementation of local social policies.

At the same time, he was elected representative of the Ardennes twice: in 1981, during the socialist wave following the election of François Mitterrand, then in 1988 after an interlude due to the proportional representation system of 1986. In the National Assembly, he sat with the Socialists and affiliated group and spoke on industrial and labor issues concerning his department.

After the end of his parliamentary terms, he remained involved in local community organizations and regional political life, particularly in structures linked to the labor and trade union history of the Ardennes.
