= Marc Vampa =

French politician

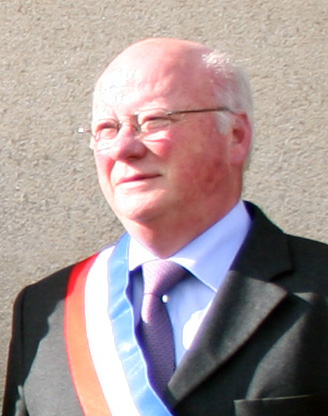
- Vampa in 2009

Mayor of Beaumesnil
- Incumbent
- Assumed office 19 March 2001

Member of the National Assembly for Eure's 3rd constituency
- In office 20 July 2007 – 14 December 2010
- Preceded by: Hervé Morin
- Succeeded by: Hervé Morin

Personal details
- Born: 8 June 1946 (age 79) Paris, France
- Party: The Centrists

Marc Vampa (born 8 June 1946) is a member of the National Assembly of France. He represents the Eure department, and is a member of the New Centre.

He is a former scientist and managed his own computer company, before becoming a trader in Bernay.

He became mayor of Beaumesnil, Eure in 2001, and General Councillor of the District of Beaumesnil since 1997.
