= Hervé Morin =

French politician

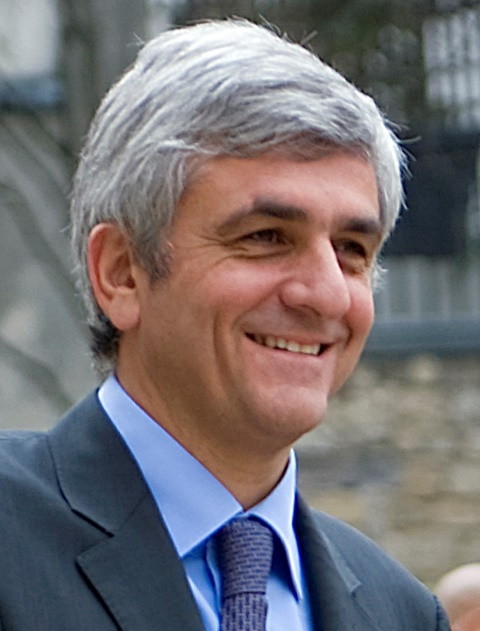
- Hervé Morin in 2010

President of Normandy
- Incumbent
- Assumed office 4 January 2016
- Preceded by: Laurent Beauvais (Lower Normandy); Nicolas Mayer-Rossignol (Upper Normandy)

Member of the National Assembly for Eure's 3rd constituency
- In office 14 December 2010 – 20 July 2016
- Preceded by: Marc Vampa
- Succeeded by: Marie Tamarelle-Verhaeghe
- In office 30 November 1998 – 19 July 2007
- Preceded by: Ladislas Poniatowski
- Succeeded by: Marc Vampa

Leader of The Centrists
- Incumbent
- Assumed office 29 May 2007
- Preceded by: Office established

Minister of Defence
- In office 18 May 2007 – 14 November 2010
- Prime Minister: François Fillon
- Preceded by: Michèle Alliot-Marie
- Succeeded by: Alain Juppé

Mayor of Épaignes
- In office 19 June 1995 – 4 January 2016
- Preceded by: Pierre Duboc
- Succeeded by: Marie-Paule Leblanc

Personal details
- Born: 17 August 1961 (age 65) Pont-Audemer, France
- Party: The Centrists (2007–present)
- Other political affiliations: UDF (before 2007)
- Education: University of Caen; Panthéon-Assas University; Sciences Po

Hervé Morin (French pronunciation: [ɛʁve mɔʁɛ̃]; born 17 August 1961) is a French politician of the Centrists who has been serving as the first President of the Regional Council of Normandy since January 2016. Under President Nicolas Sarkozy, he was the Minister of Defence.

== Political career ==
=== Member of the National Assembly ===
Morin was first elected as a representative to the French National Assembly on 16 June 2002, in the 3rd constituency of Eure, Normandy. He served as chairman of the Union for French Democracy (UDF) group in the National Assembly. After the UDF's candidate for the 2007 presidential election, François Bayrou, did not make it to the 2nd round, he hinted that he attempted to create an alliance with the Socialist Party and decided to found a new political party: the Democratic Movement (or MoDem). Consequently, Morin, who is of the center-right and an ally of the presidential election's winner, Nicolas Sarkozy, made it an organisation within the presidential majority in the National Assembly. It is now called New Centre and he is the leader.

After the creation of the UMP, Morin took the presidency of the UDF group at the National Assembly, from 2002 to 2007. When Morin joined the government as minister of Defence in July 2007, Marc Vampa of New Centre replaced him as representative.

=== Minister of Defence ===
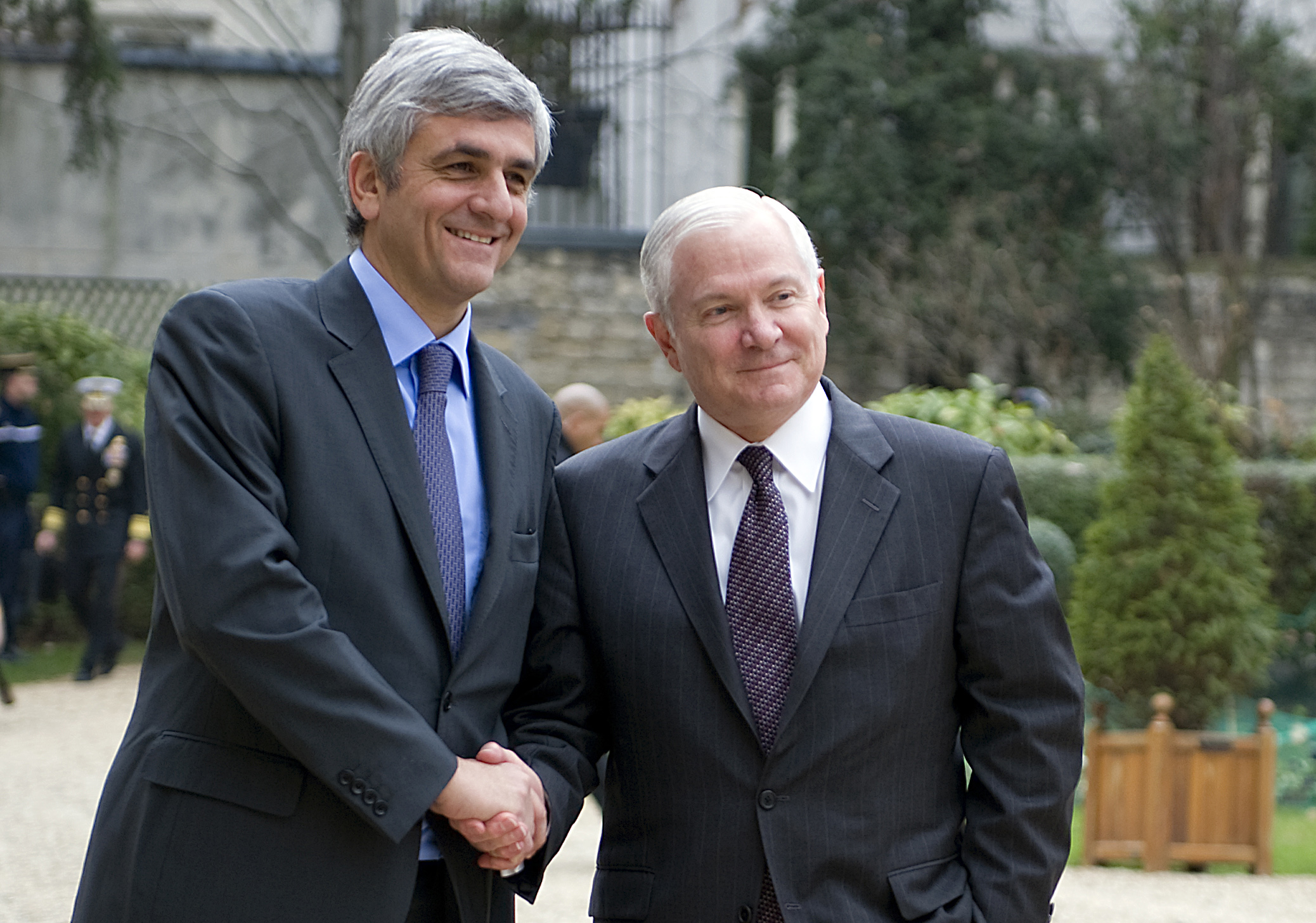
Morin with US Secretary of Defense Robert Gates in 2010

Following the Battle of N'Djamena in 2008, Morin flew to Chad in a show of support for President Idriss Deby, who had just survived an assault on the capital by rebels seeking to topple him. Over the course of 2009, he oversaw efforts to halve the number of troops deployed in Ivory Coast to 900.

In 2009, Morin rejected requests by U.S. President Barack Obama for reinforcements to Afghanistan, arguing the France had already deployed enough troops. He instead called on NATO partners to set specific timelines for achieving progress in Afghanistan in areas including security and governance.

After France had long refused to officially recognise a link between its testing of nuclear bombs in the Pacific Ocean and health complaints reported by both military and civilian staff involved in the tests, Morin announced in 2009 that the government would compensate victims of past nuclear tests and has earmarked an initial 10 million euros to do so.

When Pierre Siramy, a former deputy director of intelligence service DGSE Pierre Siramy published his memoirs in 2010, Morin filed a complaint against him, accusing him of violating secrecy rules and divulging the identities of operatives.

=== Later career ===
On 27 November 2011, Morin officially announced his intention to run for the 2012 French presidential election. At the time of the announcement, he had the support of about 20 deputies, senators and European parliamentarians, and polls saw him winning only between 1-2 percent of the vote. During his campaign he claimed to have been present at the allied invasion of Normandy (1944), although he was not born until 1961. On 16 February 2012, he withdrew his candidacy and gave support to Nicolas Sarkozy.

In 2013, Jean-Louis Borloo of the Union of Democrats and Independents (UDI) included Morin in his shadow cabinet; in this capacity, he served as opposition counterpart to Minister of Economic Affairs and Finance Pierre Moscovici.

In the Republicans' 2016 primaries, Morin endorsed Bruno Le Maire as the center-right parties joint candidate for the 2017 French presidential election; after Le Maire was eliminated in the first round, Morin supported François Fillon. Shortly after, he left the UDI.

Ahead of the 2022 presidential elections, Morin publicly declared his support for Valérie Pécresse as the Republicans’ candidate.

=== Overview ===
Governmental functions

Minister of Defence : 2007–2010

Electoral mandates

National Assembly of France

Member of the National Assembly of France for Eure (3rd constituency) : 1998–2007 (Became minister in 2007) / 2010–2016. Elected in 1998, reelected in 2002, 2007, 2012. Resignation in 2016.

General Council

General councillor of Eure : 1992–2004 / 2011-2014 (Resignation). Reelected in 1998 and 2011.

Regional Council

Regional councillor and President of Normandy, elected in Eure constituency : Since 2016.

Regional councillor of Haute-Normandie, elected in Eure constituency : 2004–2010.

Municipal Council

Mayor of Epaignes : 1995–2016. Reelected in 2001, 2008, 2014. Resignation in 2016.

Municipal councillor of Epaignes : Since 1989. Reelected in 1995, 2001, 2008, 2014.

Community of communes Council

President of the Communauté de communes of Canton de Cormeilles : Since 2001. Reelected in 2008, 2014.

Member of the Communauté de communes of Canton de Cormeilles : Since 2001. Reelected in 2008, 2014.

== Other activities ==
- Bpifrance, Member of the Supervisory Board (since 2016)

Political offices
Preceded by Michèle Alliot-Marie	Minister of Defence; 2007–2010	Succeeded by Alain Juppé as Minister of Defence and Veterans Affairs
