= Ladislas Poniatowski =

French politician

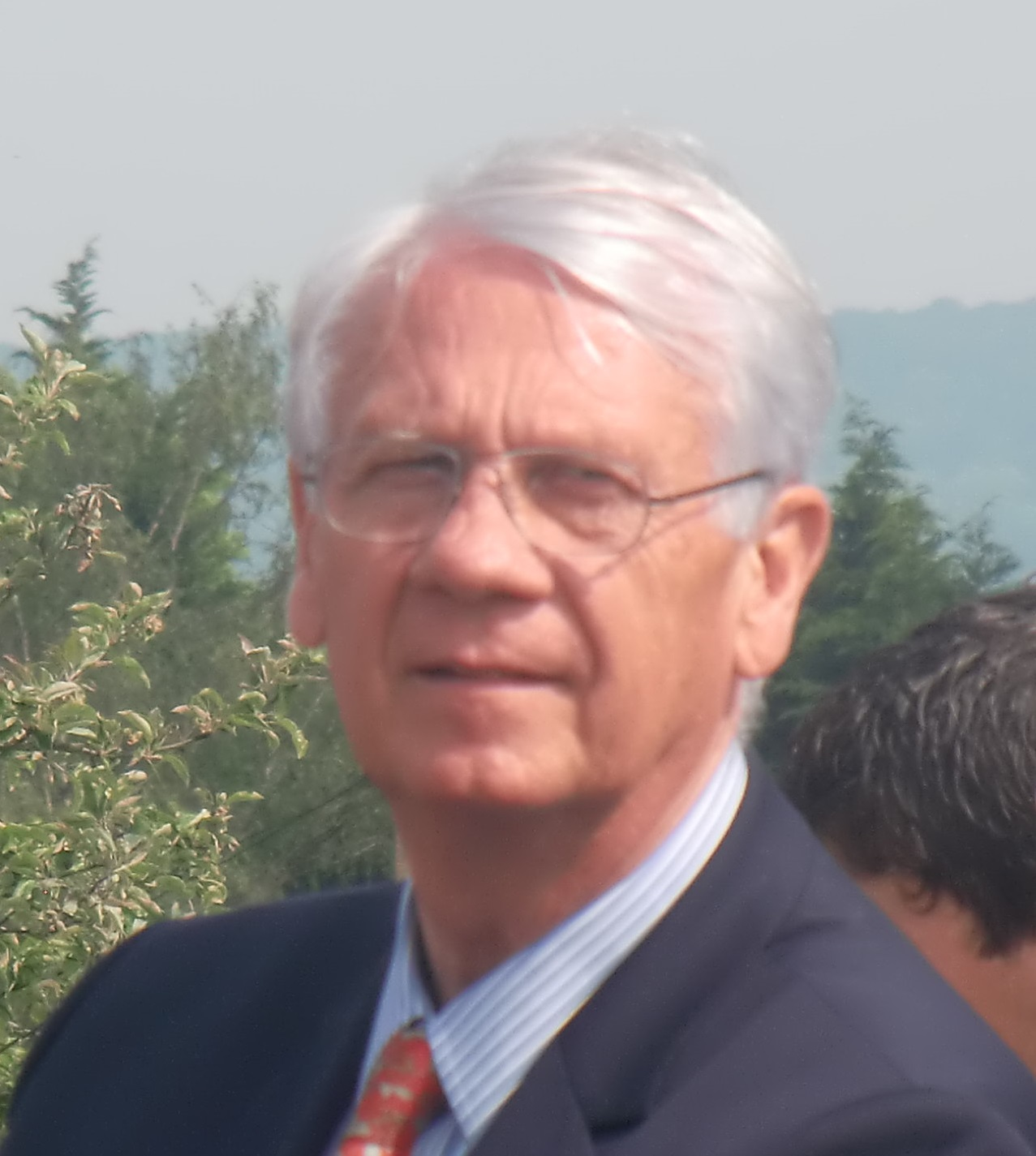
- Ladislas Poniatowski in 2011

Member of the French Senate for Eure
- In office 1 October 1998 – 30 September 2020

Member of the National Assembly
- In office 2 April 1986 – 27 September 1998
- Preceded by: multi-member proportional representation
- Succeeded by: Hervé Morin
- Constituency: Eure's 3rd constituency

Personal details
- Born: 10 November 1946 (age 79) Boulogne-Billancourt, France
- Party: UMP; The Republicans
- Relations: Axel Poniatowski (brother)

Ladislas Poniatowski (born 10 November 1946) is a French politician.

He served on the National Assembly for Eure's 3rd constituency from 1986 to 1998, when he was elected to the Senate, representing the Eure department. Poniatowski's tenure as a senator ended in 2020. As a deputy, Poniatowski was affiliated with the Union for French Democracy. He subsequently joined the Union for a Popular Movement, and later The Republicans. He is the son of Michel Poniatowski and older brother of Axel Poniatowski. Through his father, he is a distant relative of the last king of Poland Stanisław II August and of Marshal Józef Poniatowski.
