= Eure's 1st constituency =

Constituency of the National Assembly of France

1st constituency of Eure
- inline Constituency of the National Assembly of France

- map of constituency in department

- Location of Eure in France
- Deputy: Christine Loir; RN
- Department: Eure
- Cantons: Breteuil, Damville, Evreux Est, Evreux Sud, Nonancourt, Pacy-sur-Eure, Saint-André-de-l'Eure, Verneuil-sur-Avre

The 1st constituency of Eure is a French legislative constituency in Eure.

== Historic representation ==
Election	Member	Party
1958	Jean de Broglie	CNIP
1962	Jean de Broglie	RI
1967	Jean de Broglie	UDR
1968	Jean de Broglie	UDR
1973	Jean de Broglie	UDR
1978	Pierre Monfrais	UDF
1981	Luc Tinseau	PS
1986	Proportional representation - no election by constituency	
1988	Jean-Louis Debré	RPR
1993	Jean-Louis Debré	RPR
1995	Françoise Charpentier (Note: Substitute for Jean-Louis Debré, appointed to government)	RPR
1997	Jean-Louis Debré	RPR
2002	Jean-Louis Debré	UMP
2007	Françoise Charpentier (Note: Substitute for Jean-Louis Debré, appointed to government)	UMP
2007	Bruno Le Maire	UMP
2009	Guy Lefrand (Note: Substitute for Bruno Le Maire, appointed to government)	UMP
2012	Bruno Le Maire	UMP
2017	Bruno Le Maire	LREM
2017	Séverine Gipson (Note: Substitute for Bruno Le Maire, appointed Minister of the Economy and Finance)	LREM
2022	Christine Loir	RN
2024	Christine Loir	RN

== Election results ==
=== 2024 ===
Candidate	Party	Alliance	First round			Second round		
Candidate	Party	Alliance	Votes	%	+/–	Votes	%	+/–
Christine Loir	RN		25,853	46.54	+16.65	27,891	50.83	+0.06
Julien Canin	REN	Ensemble	15,837	28.51	+1.77	26,984	49.17	-0.06
Christine Le Bonté	PS	NFP	11,991	21.58	+2.36	withdrew		
Anne Ducamp	LO		1,009	1.82	+0.50			
Jacques Thalmann	REC		866	1.56	-2.83			
Votes			55,556	100.00		54,875	100.00	
Valid votes			55,556	97.04	-0.74	54,875	95.51	+3.22
Blank votes			1,220	2.13	+0.48	2,010	3.50	-2.53
Null votes			473	0.83	+0.26	568	0.99	-0.69
Turnout			57,249	65.51	+18.87	57,453	65.73	+19.92
Abstentions			30,142	34.49	-18.87	29,953	34.27	-19.92
Registered voters			87,391			87,406		
Result			RN HOLD					

=== 2022 ===
Legislative Election 2022: Eure's 1st constituency
Party	Candidate	Votes	%	±%
RN	Christine Loir	11,830	29.89	+7.80
LREM (Ensemble)	Séverine Gipson	10,583	26.74	-17.72
LFI (NUPÉS)	Christophe Ancelin	7,609	19.22	+1.46
LR (UDC)	Christophe Alory	3,219	8.13	+1.97
REC	Valérie Poirson	1,736	4.39	N/A
DVE	Véronique Allo	1,479	3.74	N/A
DVG	Anne Mansouret	826	2.09	N/A
Others	N/A	2,298	5.81	
Turnout		39,580	46.64	−1.35
2nd round result
RN	Christine Loir	18,629	50.77	+15.30
LREM (Ensemble)	Séverine Gipson	18,062	49.23	−15.30
Turnout		36,691	45.81	+3.55
RN gain from LREM				

=== 2017 ===
Candidate	Label	First round		Second round	
Candidate	Label	Votes	%	Votes	%
Bruno Le Maire	REM	17,967	44.46	21,398	64.53
Fabienne Delacour	FN	8,927	22.09	11,761	35.47
Michaël Després	FI	4,621	11.43		
Coumba Dioukhané	LR	2,489	6.16		
Laëtitia Sanchez	ECO	1,992	4.93		
Nicolas Miguet	DIV	1,041	2.58		
Véronique Allo	ECO	780	1.93		
Maryata Konté	PCF	566	1.40		
Michaële Le Goff	DIV	472	1.17		
Denis Panier	EXG	440	1.09		
Fataumata Niakate	DLF	405	1.00		
Remzi Sekerci	DIV	291	0.72		
Frédérique Manley	DIV	245	0.61		
Sid-Ali Ferrouk	DIV	122	0.30		
Patricia Saint-Georges	DVG	41	0.10		
Wilfried Paris	DIV	14	0.03		
Minatou Graibis	DIV	1	0.00		
Votes		40,414	100.00	33,159	100.00
Valid votes		40,414	97.45	33,159	90.81
Blank votes		772	1.86	2,511	6.88
Null votes		286	0.69	844	2.31
Turnout		41,472	47.99	36,514	42.26
Abstentions		44,944	52.01	49,892	57.74
Registered voters		86,416		86,406	
Source: Ministry of the Interior

=== 2012 ===
2012 legislative election in Eure's 1st constituency
Candidate	Party	First round		Second round	
Candidate	Party	Votes	%	Votes	%
Bruno Le Maire	UMP	19,906	41.35%	26,961	57.97%
Michel Champredon	PRG–PS	15,164	31.50%	19,544	42.03%
Nathalie Billard	FN	7,921	16.45%		
Sandrine Cocagne	FG	2,493	5.18%		
Driss Ettazaoui	MoDem	1,058	2.20%		
Jérôme Delenda	UDN	463	0.96%		
Corinne Roethlisberger	LO	348	0.72%		
Jean-André Delabarre	NPA	312	0.65%		
Jean Lemoine	CPNT	285	0.59%		
Michel Vimard	BI	190	0.39%		
Valid votes		48,140	98.58%	46,505	96.72%
Spoilt and null votes		693	1.42%	1,575	3.28%
Votes cast / turnout		48,833	57.20%	48,080	56.33%
Abstentions		36,538	42.80%	37,278	43.67%
Registered voters		85,371	100.00%	85,358	100.00%
