= Séverine Gipson =

French politician

Member of the National Assembly for Eure's 1st constituency
- In office 21 July 2017 – 21 June 2022
- Preceded by: Bruno Le Maire
- Succeeded by: Christine Loir

Mayor of Foucrainville
- In office 2014–2017
- Preceded by: Florence Godart
- Succeeded by: Roselyne Conte

Personal details
- Born: 13 December 1970 (age 55) Évreux, France
- Party: La République En Marche!

Séverine Gipson (born 13 December 1970) is a French politician of La République En Marche! (LREM) who served as a member of the National Assembly since 2017.

Gipson was a quality engineer at the National Prevention and Protection Center (CNPP). She later served as the independent Mayor of Foucrainville from 2014 to 2017.

In the 2017 French legislative election, Gipson was the substitute candidate for Bruno Le Maire for Eure's 1st constituency. She succeeded Le Maire on 22 July 2017 when he was appointed Minister of the Economy and Finance. She subsequently resigned as Mayor of Foucrainville and was replaced by her deputy, Roselyne Conte.

In Parliament, Gipson served on the Defence Committee. In addition to her committee assignments, she was a member of the French parliamentary friendship group with Austria, Indonesia, Iceland, Namibia and Slovakia.

She lost her seat to Christine Loir from National Rally in the 2022 French legislative election.
