= Philippe Vuilque =

French politician

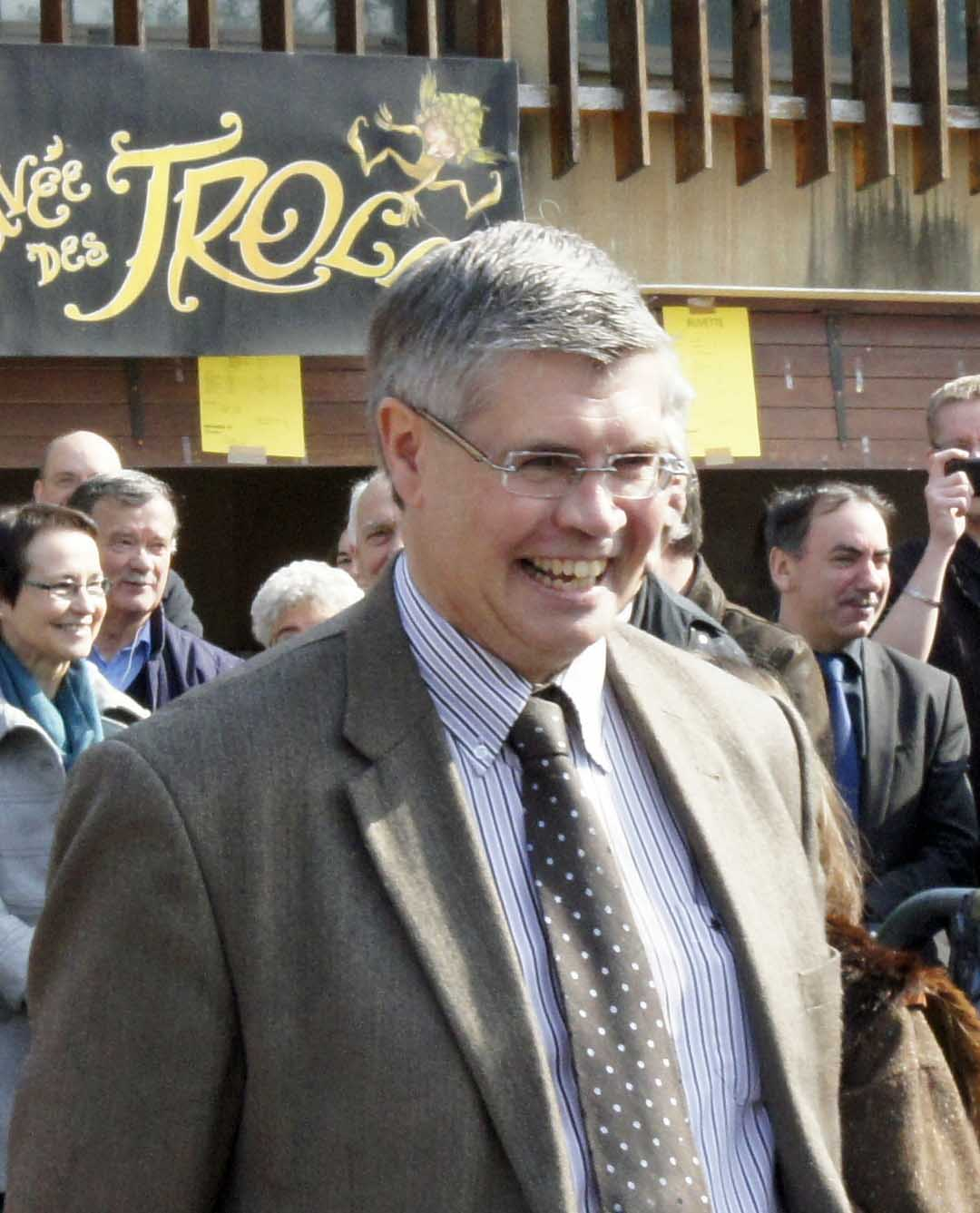
- Philippe Vuilque in 2012
- Parliamentary group: Socialist

Deputy for Ardennes' 2nd constituency in the National Assembly of France
- In office 1997–2012
- Preceded by: Philippe Mathot
- Succeeded by: Christophe Léonard

Personal details
- Born: January 29, 1956 (age 70) Charleville (Ardennes)

Philippe Vuilque (born 29 January 1956 in Charleville-Mézières, Ardennes) was a member of the National Assembly of France. He represented the 2nd constituency of the Ardennes department from 1997 to 2012, as is a member of the Socialiste, radical, citoyen et divers gauche.
