= Ardennes's 1st constituency =

Constituency of the National Assembly of France

1st constituency of Ardennes
- inline Constituency of the National Assembly of France

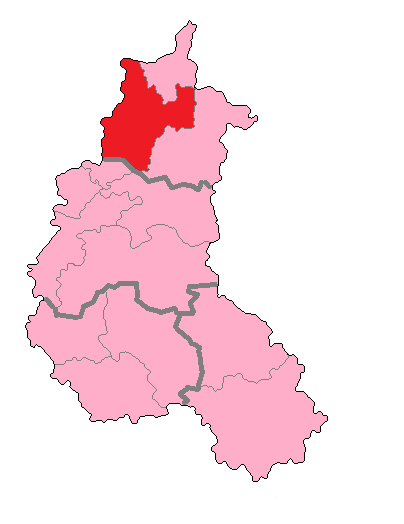
- Ardennes's 1st Constituency shown within Champagne-Ardenne
- Deputy: Lionel Vuibert (SE)
- Department: Ardennes
- Cantons: Asfeld, Charleville-Centre, Château-Porcien, Chaumont-Porcien, Flize, Juniville, Mézières-Est, Novion-Porcien, Omont, Rethel, Rumigny, Signy-l'Abbaye, Signy-le-Petit, Villers-Semeuse
- Registered voters: 73,262

The 1st constituency of the Ardennes is a French legislative constituency in the Ardennes département. It is currently vacant following the resignation of National Rally deputy Flavien Termet for health reasons.

== Description ==
It is located in the south-west third of the department, and cuts the town of Charleville-Mézières in two.

== Deputies ==
Election	Member	Party
1958	Michel Colinet	CNIP
1962	Lucien Meunier	UNR
1967	Lucien Meunier	UNR
1968	Lucien Meunier	UNR
1973	Lucien Meunier	UNR
1978	Alain Léger	PCF
1981	Roger Mas	PS
1986	Proportional representation – no election by constituency	
1988	Roger Mas	PS
1993	Michel Vuibert	UDF
1997	Claudine Ledoux	PS
2002	Bérengère Poletti	UMP
2007	Bérengère Poletti	UMP
2012	Bérengère Poletti	UMP
2017	Bérengère Poletti	LR
2022	Lionel Vuibert	Agir
2024	Flavien Termet	RN
2024	Lionel Vuibert	SE

== Election results ==
=== 2024 by-election ===
Candidate	Party	Alliance	First round		Second round	
Candidate	Party	Alliance	Votes	%	Votes	%
Jordan Duflot	RN		8,290	39.12	10,227	49.11
Lionel Vuibert	SE		5,388	25.43	10,559	50.89
Guillaume Maréchal	LR		3,399	16.04		
Damien Lerouge	PS	NFP	2,254	10.64		
Rémy Talarico	SE		885	4.18		
Bruno North	CNIP		292	1.38		
Juliette de Causans	ECO		269	1.27		
Sonia d'Orgeville	ÉAC		206	0.97		
Mink Takawé	LO		197	0.93		
Luca De Paris	DIV		11	0.05		
Farouk Raphaël Sandassi	SE		0	0.00		
Valid votes			21,191	98.00	20,826	95.04
Blank votes			278	1.29	750	3.42
Null votes			155	0.72	338	1.54
Turnout			21,624	30.46	21,914	30.87
Abstentions			49,370	69.54	49,079	69.13
Registered voters			70,664		70,667	
Result		SE GAIN				

=== 2024 ===
Candidate	Party	Alliance	First round		Second round	
Candidate	Party	Alliance	Votes	%	Votes	%
Flavien Termet	RN		17,817	38.33	24,184	52.99
Lionel Vuibert	REN	Ensemble	12,157	26.16	21,458	47.01
Damien Lerouge	PS	NFP	8,128	17.48		
Christian Charvet	EXD		4,257	9.16		
Sabine Misset	LR	UDC	1,782	3.83		
Arnaud Rennesson	DIV		998	2.15		
Sonia D’Orgeville	ECO		956	2.06		
Nadia Octave	LO		386	0.83		
Valid votes			46,480	97.75	45,642	95.69
Blank votes			660	1.39	1,524	3.20
Null votes			411	0.86	533	1.12
Turnout			47,551	67.29	47,699	67.50
Abstentions			23,113	32.71	22,968	32.50
Registered voters			70,664		70,667	
Result			RN GAIN			

=== 2022 ===
Legislative Election 2022: Ardennes's 1st constituency
Party	Candidate	Votes	%	±%
RN	Laurent Richard	8,835	27.40	+6.33
Agir (Ensemble)	Lionel Vuibert	6,602	20.47	-2.70
LR (UDC)	Guillaume Marechal	6,339	19.66	−18.13
EELV (NUPÉS)	Julien Duruisseau	5,960	18.48	+4.54
REC	Sébastien Laurent	1,438	4.46	N/A
LREM	Juliette De Causans*	1,379	4.28	N/A
DIV	Arnaud Rennesson	927	2.87	N/A
Others	N/A	769	2.38	
Turnout		32,249	46.53	−1.34
2nd round result
Agir (Ensemble)	Lionel Vuibert	14,862	50.34	+20.02
RN	Laurent Richard	14,664	49.66	N/A
Turnout		29,526	45.12	+3.71
Agir gain from LR				

* Dissident LREM candidate, not supported by Ensemble.

=== 2017 ===
Candidate	Label	First round		Second round	
Candidate	Label	Votes	%	Votes	%
Bérengère Poletti	LR	13,053	37.79	19,311	69.68
Jean-Pierre Morali	REM	8,004	23.17	8,404	30.32
Sophie Lorenzo	FN	7,278	21.07		
Françoise Verlhac	FI	2,040	5.91		
Christophe Dumont	ECO	1,491	4.32		
Sylvain Dalla-Rosa	PCF	1,282	3.71		
Fabien Andréo	DIV	450	1.30		
Sylvie Goulden	ECO	410	1.19		
Nésida Pommier	EXG	330	0.96		
Nicolas Ferio	DIV	201	0.58		
Votes		34,539	100.00	27,715	100.00
Valid votes		34,539	98.37	27,715	91.22
Blank votes		366	1.04	1,787	5.88
Null votes		207	0.59	879	2.89
Turnout		35,112	47.87	30,381	41.41
Abstentions		38,231	52.13	42,990	58.59
Registered voters		73,343		73,371	
Source: Ministry of the Interior

=== 2012 ===
Summary of the 10 and 17 June 2012 French legislative in Ardennes’ 1st Constituency election results
Candidate	Party		1st round		2nd round	
Candidate	Party		Votes	%	Votes	%
Bérengère Poletti	Union for a Popular Movement	UMP	16,520	39.56%	22,687	55.30%
Claudine Ledoux	Socialist Party	PS	14,126	33.83%	18,339	44.70%
Anne-Sophie Leclere	National Front	FN	7,000	16.76%		
Sylvain Dalla Rosa	Left Front	FG	1,992	4.77%		
Christophe Dumont	The Greens	VEC	790	1.89%		
Virginie Lauby Heber-Suffrin		CEN	773	1.85%		
Joël Nouet	Far Left	EXG	214	0.51%		
Sylvie Goulden	Ecologist	ECO	187	0.45%		
Christiane Gey	Miscellaneous Right	DVD	153	0.37%		
Total			41,755	100%	41,026	100%
Registered voters			73,277		73,262	
Blank/Void ballots			498	1.18%	1,275	3.01%
Turnout			42,253	57.66%	42,301	57.74%
Abstentions			31,024	42.34%	30,961	42.26%
Result					UMP HOLD	

=== 2007 ===
Summary of the 10 and 17 June 2007 French legislative in Ardennes’ 1st Constituency election results
Candidate	Party		1st round		2nd round	
Candidate	Party		Votes	%	Votes	%
Bérengère Poletti	Union for a Popular Movement	UMP	20,922	48.93%	24,808	59.52%
Claudine Ledoux	Socialist Party	PS	11,499	26.89%	16,870	40.48%
Jean-François Leclet	Democratic Movement	MoDem	4,116	9.63%		
Chantal Taioli	National Front	FN	1,829	4.28%		
Sylvain Dalla Rosa	Communist	COM	1,401	3.28%		
François Botte	Far Left	EXG	928	2.17%		
Philippe Lenice	The Greens	VEC	880	2.06%		
Nadia Octave	Far Left	EXG	459	1.07%		
Valérie Lenoir	Movement for France	MPF	419	0.98%		
Philippe Fesneau	Far Right	EXD	303	0.71%		
Total			42,756	100%	41,678	100%
Registered voters			73,473		73,470	
Blank/Void ballots			590	1.36%	1,168	2.73%
Turnout			43,346	59.00%	42,846	58.32%
Abstentions			30,127	41.00%	30,624	41.68%
Result					UMP HOLD	

=== 2002 ===
Legislative Election 2002: Ardennes's 1st constituency
Party	Candidate	Votes	%	±%
UMP	Bérengère Poletti	17,245	40.10	
PS	Claudine Ledoux	16,196	37.66	
FN	Chantal Taioli	6,299	14.65	
Others	N/A	3,269		
Turnout		43,857	62.30	
2nd round result
UMP	Bérengère Poletti	22,522	53.98	
PS	Claudine Ledoux	19,198	46.02	
Turnout		43,133	61.28	
UMP gain from PS				

=== 1997 ===
Legislative Election 1997: Ardennes's 1st constituency
Party	Candidate	Votes	%	±%
UDF	Michel Vuibert	13,413	29.57	
PS	Claudine Ledoux	12,440	27.42	
FN	Emile Wagner	9,893	21.81	
PCF	Sylvain Dalla-Rosa	3,849	8.48	
LV	Philippe Lenice	2,222	4.90	
LO	Michel Loux	1,474	3.25	
MPF	Mario Rebaudengo	1,403	3.09	
DIV	Isabelle Baudry	672	1.48	
Turnout		47,324	68.42	
2nd round result
PS	Claudine Ledoux	22,843	45.41	
UDF	Michel Vuibert	19,740	39.24	
FN	Emile Wagner	7,726	15.36	
Turnout		51,710	74.76	
PS gain from UDF				
