= Pierre Cordier (politician) =

French politician (born 1972)

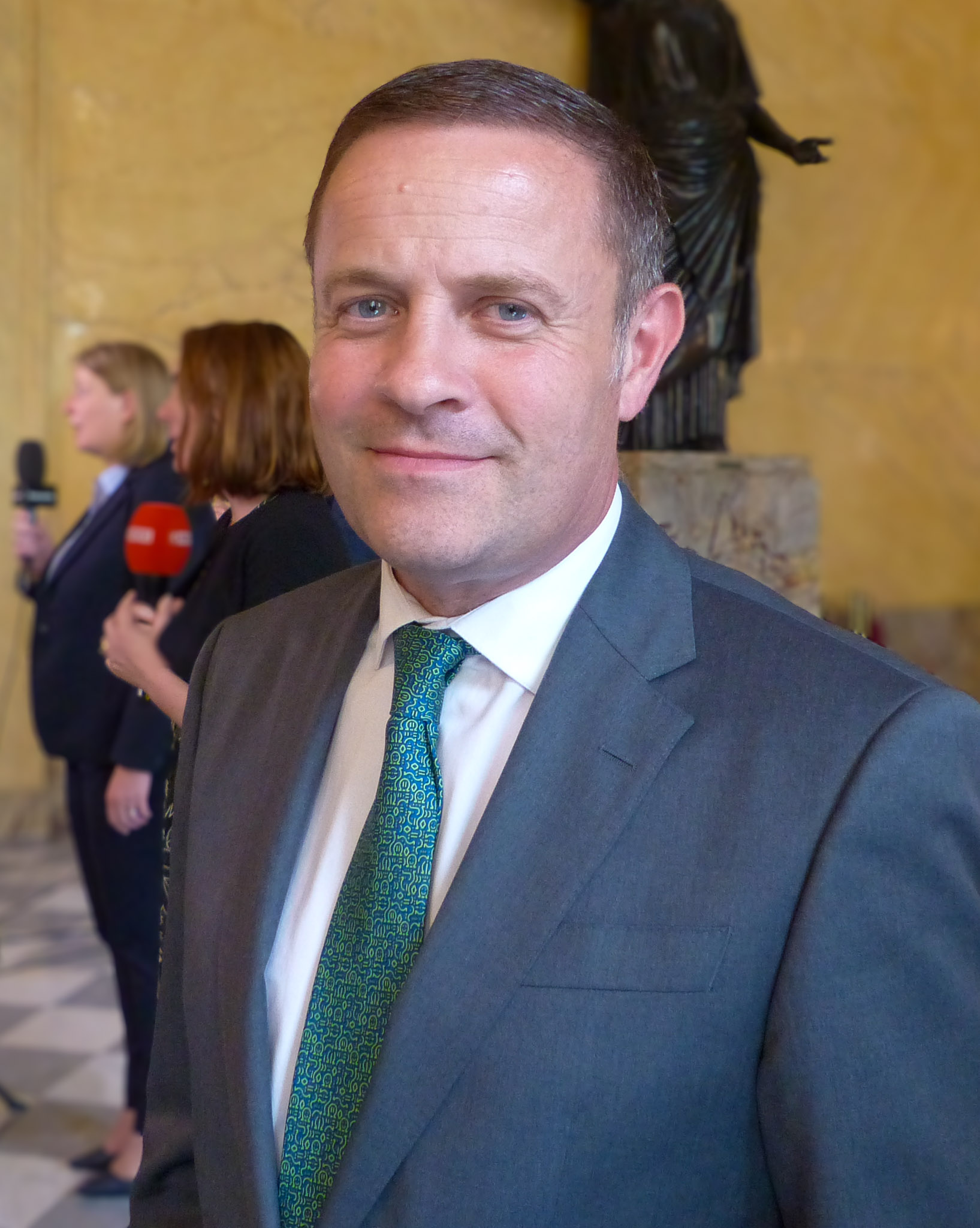

Member of the National Assembly for Ardennes's 2nd constituency
- Incumbent
- Assumed office 21 June 2017
- Preceded by: Christophe Léonard

Mayor of Neufmanil
- In office 19 March 2001 – 18 October 2017
- Preceded by: Betty Eyquem
- Succeeded by: Dominique Wafflard

Personal details
- Born: 27 May 1972 (age 53) Charleville-Mézières, France
- Party: The Republicans

Pierre Cordier (French pronunciation: [pjɛʁ kɔʁdje]; born 27 May 1972) is a French politician who has represented the 2nd constituency of the Ardennes department in the National Assembly since 2017. He is a member of The Republicans (LR).

== Political career ==
Cordier serves as the Shadow Minister for Labour and Training in the shadow cabinet of France. Ahead of the Republicans’ 2022 convention, he endorsed Éric Ciotti as the party's chairman.

== See also ==
- List of deputies of the 15th National Assembly of France
