= René Visse =

French politician (1937–2020)

René Visse (22 October 1937 – 20 February 2020) was a French politician who served as a Deputy from Ardennes's 2nd constituency on behalf of the French Communist Party between 1978 and 1981.
