= Christine Loir =

French politician

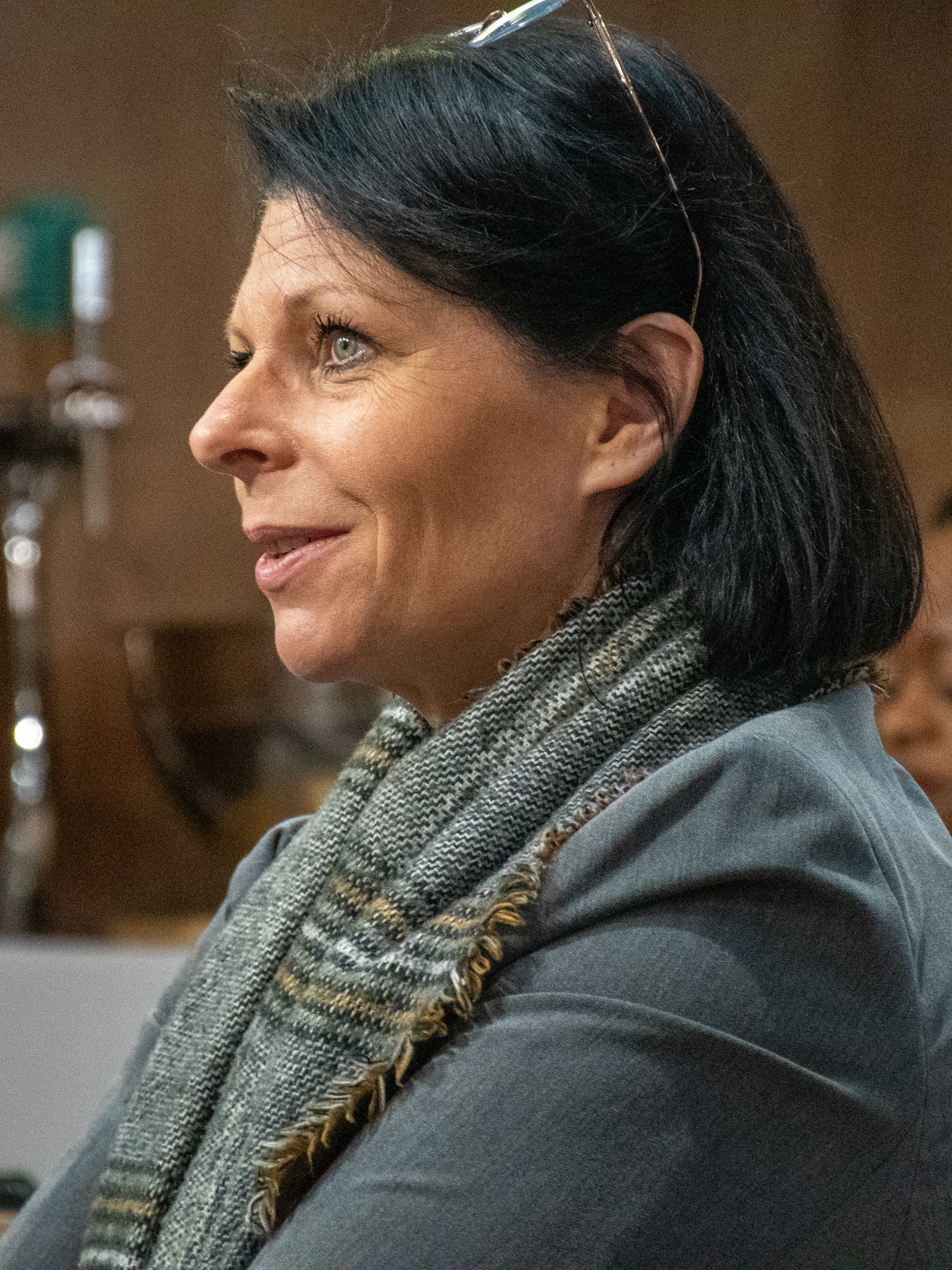

Member of the National Assembly for Eure's 1st constituency
- Incumbent
- Assumed office 22 June 2022
- Preceded by: Séverine Gipson

Personal details
- Born: 22 February 1977 (age 49) Pont Audemer, France
- Party: National Rally

Christine Loir (born 22 February 1977) is a French politician of the National Rally. She was elected as a Member of the National Assembly for Eure's 1st constituency in 2022.

Loir was born in Pont Audemer in 1977. She was a social worker and health visitor before entering politics. She stood in the 2022 regional elections in Verneuil d'Avre et d'Iton but was not elected. For the 2022 French legislative election, Loir was selected to run in the first constituency of Eure. She was successful at taking the seat in the second round and defeated LREM incumbent Séverine Gipson.
