= Kévin Mauvieux =

French politician

Member of the National Assembly for Eure's 3rd constituency
- Incumbent
- Assumed office 22 June 2022
- Preceded by: Marie Tamarelle-Verhaeghe

Personal details
- Born: 9 September 1991 (age 34)
- Party: National Rally (2022-present)
- Other political affiliations: The Republicans (until 2020)

Kévin Mauvieux (born 9 September 1991) is a French politician of the National Rally and is a member of the National Assembly for Eure's 3rd constituency since 2022.

Mauvieux worked as an insurance broker before getting involved in politics. He first joined the Union for a Popular Movement at the age of 18 which was later reconstituted as The Republicans. Mauvieux has stated that he would not have voted for the Front National under its previous leadership but supports the policies of Marine Le Pen and argued that the Republicans were moving too close to the ruling En Marche! (LREM) party under Emmanuel Macron, saying "the Republicans have become the branch of LREM."

He joined the National Rally in 2022 and was elected as a municipal councilor for the party in Pont-Audemer. He contested the constituency of Eure's 3rd during the 2022 French legislative election. He subsequently won the seat.
