= Biencourt-sur-Orge =

- Commune
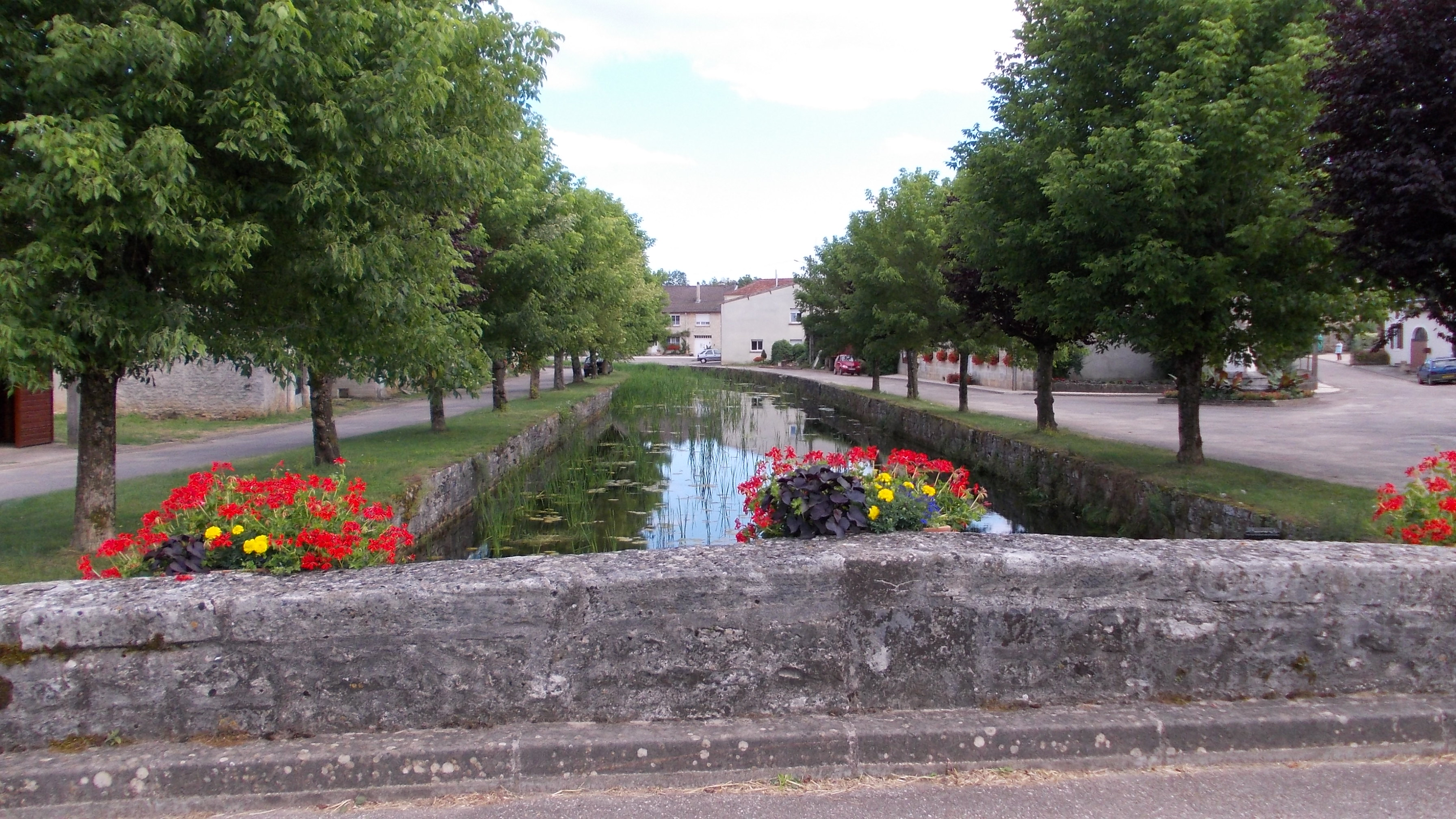
- The Orge river in Biencourt-sur-Orge

- Coat of arms
- Location of Biencourt-sur-Orge
- Location within France Location within Grand Est
- Coordinates: 48°33′50″N 5°20′55″E
- Country: France
- Region: Grand Est
- Department: Meuse
- Arrondissement: Bar-le-Duc
- Canton: Ligny-en-Barrois
- Intercommunality: Portes de Meuse

Government
  - Mayor (2020–2026): Didier Thiery
- Area^{1}: 12.38 km^{2} (4.78 sq mi)
- Elevation: 292 m (958 ft)
- Highest elevation: 369 m (1,211 ft)
- Lowest elevation: 276 m (906 ft)
- Population (2023): 112
  - Density: 9.05/km^{2} (23.4/sq mi)
- Time zone: UTC+01:00 (CET)
  - Summer (DST): UTC+02:00 (CEST)
- INSEE/Postal code: 55051 /55290
- ^{1} French Land Register data, which excludes lakes, ponds, glaciers > 1 km^{2} (0.386 sq mi or 247 acres) and river estuaries.

Biencourt-sur-Orge (French pronunciation: [bjɛ̃kuʁ syʁ ɔʁʒ]) is a commune in the Meuse department in Grand Est in northeastern France.

== Population ==
Historical population
Year	Pop.	±% p.a.
1968	205	—
1975	158	−3.65%
1982	153	−0.46%
1990	161	+0.64%
1999	165	+0.27%
2007	154	−0.86%
2012	117	−5.35%
2017	123	+1.01%
2023	112	−1.55%
Source: INSEE

== See also ==
- Communes of the Meuse department
