= Eure's 3rd constituency =

Constituency of the National Assembly of France

3rd constituency of Eure
- inline Constituency of the National Assembly of France

- Location of Eure in France

- Constituency in department
- Deputy: Kévin Mauvieux; RN
- Department: Eure

The 3rd constituency of Eure is a French legislative constituency in the Eure département. It contains the cantons of Bernay, Beuzeville, Bourg-Achard and Pont-Audemer.

== Deputies ==
Election	Member	Party
1958	Rémy Montagne	PRV
1962	Rémy Montagne	PRV
1967	Rémy Montagne	CD
1968	André Delahaye	UDR
1973	Rémy Montagne	CD
1978	Rémy Montagne	UDF
1981	François Loncle	MRG
1986	Proportional representation - no election by constituency	
1988	Ladislas Poniatowski	UDF
1993	Ladislas Poniatowski	UDF
1997	Ladislas Poniatowski	UDF
1998	Hervé Morin	UDF
2002	Hervé Morin	UDF
2007	Hervé Morin	NC
2012	Hervé Morin	NC
2017	Marie Tamarelle-Verhaeghe	MoDem
2022	Kévin Mauvieux	RN
2024	Kévin Mauvieux	RN

== Election results ==
=== 2024 ===
Candidate	Party	Alliance	First round			Second round		
Candidate	Party	Alliance	Votes	%	+/–	Votes	%	+/–
Kévin Mauvieux	RN		28,012	48.88	+17.16	31,417	56.80	+2.75
Marie Tamarelle-Verhaeghe	REN	Ensemble	12,238	21.35	-1.83	23,891	43.20	-2.75
Jean-Christophe Turpin	LFI	NFP	9,147	15.96	-3.16			
Thomas Elexhauser	DVD		6,259	10.92	-5.41			
Marie-Noëlle Huard	LO		963	1.68	+0.04			
Didier Daric	REC		691	1.21	-2.11			
Votes			57,310	100.00		55,308	100.00	
Valid votes			57,310	97.36	-0.37	55,308	94.16	+2.18
Blank votes			1,170	1.99	+0.25	2,647	4.51	-1.71
Null votes			383	0.65	+0.12	784	1.33	-0.47
Turnout			58,863	68.74	+18.04	58,739	68.58	+18.94
Abstentions			26,772	31.26	-18.04	26,914	31.42	-18.94
Registered voters			85,635			85,653		
Result			RN HOLD					

=== 2022 ===
Legislative Election 2022: Eure's 3rd constituency
Party	Candidate	Votes	%	±%
RN	Kévin Mauvieux	13,474	31.72	+10.25
LREM (Ensemble)	Marie Tamarelle-Verhaeghe	9,849	23.18	-7.08
LFI (NUPÉS)	Dorine Le Pecheur	8,124	19.12	−1.32
LC (UDC)	Thomas Elexhauser	6,937	16.33	+0.15
REC	Catherine Rouvier	1,410	3.32	N/A
Others	N/A	2,687	6.33	
Turnout		42,481	50.70	−0.99
2nd round result
RN	Kévin Mauvieux	21,161	54.05	+13.34
LREM (Ensemble)	Marie Tamarelle-Verhaeghe	17,989	45.95	−13.34
Turnout		39,150	49.64	+3.74
RN gain from MoDem				

=== 2017 ===
Candidate	Label	First round		Second round	
Candidate	Label	Votes	%	Votes	%
Marie Tamarelle-Verhaeghe	MoDem	12,867	30.26	20,788	59.29
Timothée Houssin	FN	9,131	21.47	14,275	40.71
Pierre Bibet	UDI	6,879	16.18		
Gwenhaël Lavergne	FI	5,173	12.16		
Isabelle Duong	DVD	3,616	8.50		
Marie-Claire Haki	PS	2,262	5.32		
Christine Régentête	ECO	1,257	2.96		
Claudette Balleydier	EXG	475	1.12		
Mathieu Normand	ECO	428	1.01		
Béatrice Palacios	DIV	242	0.57		
Christine Amanieu	DVG	195	0.46		
Votes		42,525	100.00	35,063	100.00
Valid votes		42,525	97.47	35,063	90.51
Blank votes		796	1.82	2,792	7.21
Null votes		307	0.70	883	2.28
Turnout		43,628	51.69	38,738	45.90
Abstentions		40,775	48.31	45,650	54.10
Registered voters		84,403		84,388	
Source: Ministry of the Interior

=== 2012 ===
2012 legislative election in Eure's 3rd constituency
Candidate	Party	First round		Second round	
Candidate	Party	Votes	%	Votes	%
Hervé Morin	NC	18,725	38.40%	25,166	53.17%
Mélanie Mammeri	PS	12,326	25.28%	22,164	46.83%
Nadiejda Steffan	FN	7,347	15.07%		
Francis Courel		5,535	11.35%		
Pascal Didtsch	FG	2,334	4.79%		
Rebecca Armstrong	EELV	1,421	2.91%		
Annie Brunner	DLR	528	1.08%		
Sylvie Favier	NPA	319	0.65%		
Yasmina Gharet	LO	231	0.47%		
Valid votes		48,766	98.28%	47,330	96.66%
Spoilt and null votes		851	1.72%	1,633	3.34%
Votes cast / turnout		49,617	60.73%	48,963	59.93%
Abstentions		32,086	39.27%	32,734	40.07%
Registered voters		81,703	100.00%	81,697	100.00%
