= Flavien Termet =

French politician (born 2002)

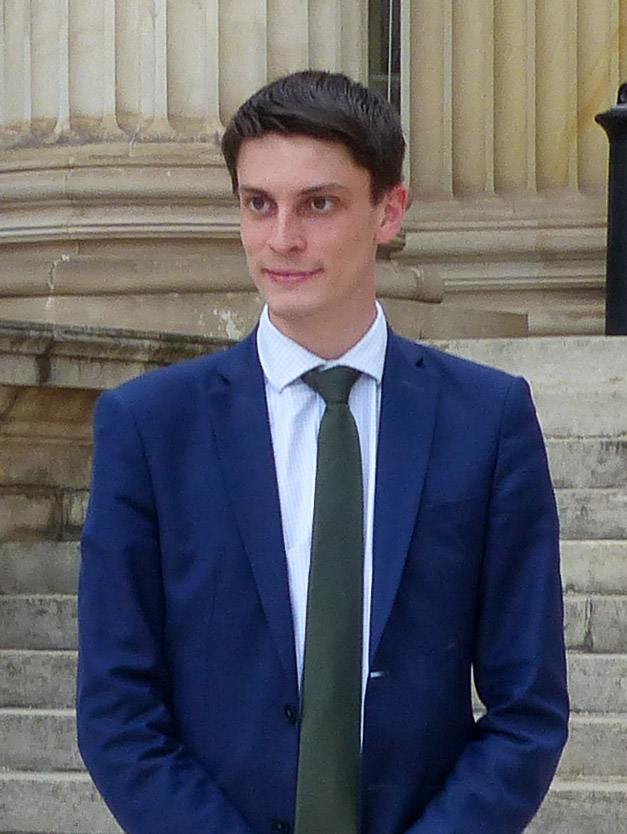

Member of the French National Assembly for Ardennes's 1st constituency
- In office 18 July – 30 September 2024
- Preceded by: Lionel Vuibert
- Succeeded by: Lionel Vuibert

Personal details
- Born: 29 January 2002 (age 24) Lorient, France
- Party: National Rally

Flavien Termet (born 29 January 2002) is a French politician who is a member of the National Rally. He was elected a member of the National Assembly for Ardennes's 1st constituency in 2024. He was the youngest member of the French Parliament after the 2024 French election. On 30 September 2024, Termet announced his resignation due to "personal, medical reasons."

== Political views ==
First involved with Les Républicains at the age of 17, Termet joined the National Rally three years later, justifying this choice by a desire to more firmly defend the legacy of Charles de Gaulle. In an interview he said that he is committed to supporting measures in favor of purchasing power within the National Assembly.

== Political career ==
Per tradition, as the youngest member Termet served as secretary in the first session. As MPs cast ballots for president of the National Assembly, the majority of left-wing MPs refused to shake Termet's hand, due to his right-wing positions. This list included one, François Piquemal, who engaged in a mock game of rock paper scissors with him.
