= Lionel Vuibert =

French politician (born 1968)

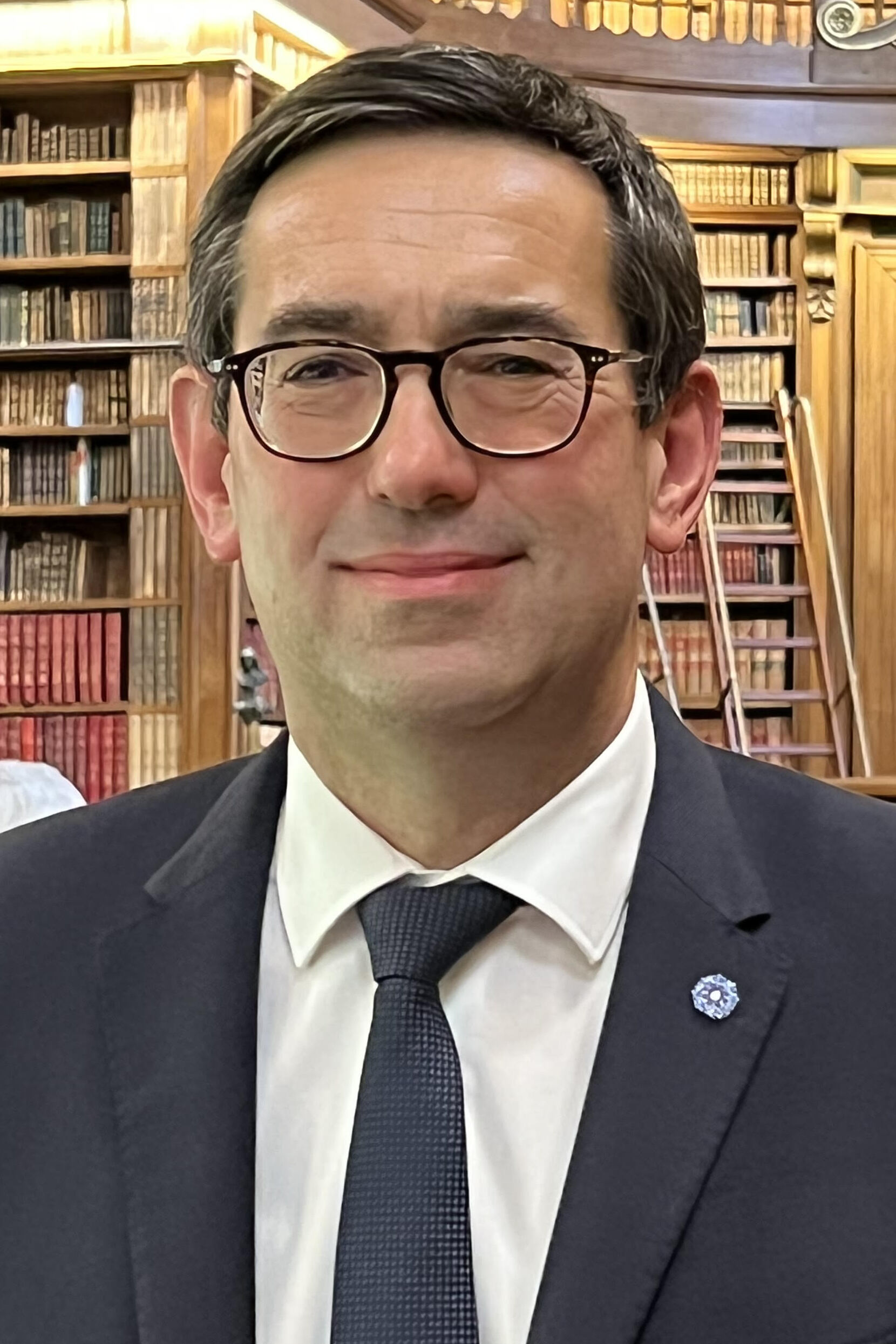
- Vuibert in 2022

Member of the National Assembly for Ardennes's 1st constituency
- Incumbent
- Assumed office 9 December 2024
- Preceded by: Flavien Termet
- In office 22 June 2022 – 9 June 2024
- Preceded by: Bérengère Poletti
- Succeeded by: Flavien Termet

Member of the Departmental Council of Ardennes
- Incumbent
- Assumed office 1 July 2021
- Preceded by: Patrick Demorgny
- Constituency: Canton of Signy-l’Abbaye

Mayor of Faissault
- In office 2008–2022
- Preceded by: Noelle Vuibert
- Succeeded by: Jean-François Bouchat

Personal details
- Born: 31 August 1968 (age 57) Villers-Semeuse (Ardennes)
- Party: Agir

Lionel Vuibert (born 31 August 1968 in Villers-Semeuse, Ardennes) is a French politician. He is the deputy for Ardennes's 1st constituency in the National Assembly of France, elected in the 2022 French legislative election, and is a member of Agir.

He is the son of Michel Vuibert, deputy for the same constituency from 1993 to 1997. He was Mayor of Faissault from 2008. In 2022, he announced that he is leaving his post as mayor as a result of his election as deputy.
