= Épaignes =

- Commune
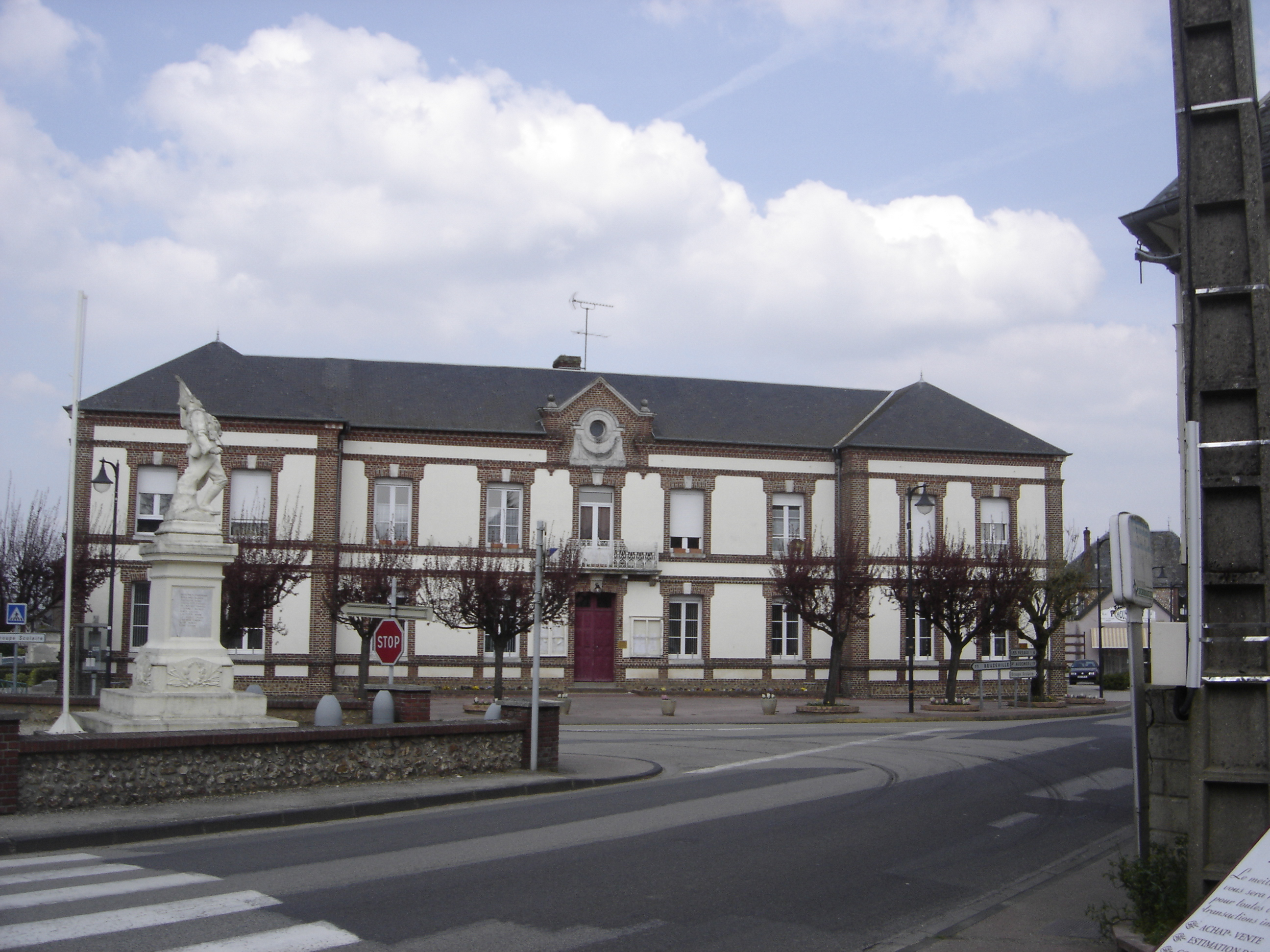
- Town hall

- Coat of arms
- Location of Épaignes
- Location within France Location within Normandy
- Coordinates: 49°16′49″N 0°26′28″E
- Country: France
- Region: Normandy
- Department: Eure
- Arrondissement: Bernay
- Canton: Beuzeville
- Intercommunality: Lieuvin Pays d'Auge

Government
  - Mayor (2020–2026): Marie-Paule Leblanc
- Area^{1}: 26.1 km^{2} (10.1 sq mi)
- Elevation: 164 m (538 ft)
- Highest elevation: 181 m (594 ft)
- Lowest elevation: 84 m (276 ft)
- Population (2023): 1,597
  - Density: 61.2/km^{2} (158/sq mi)
- Time zone: UTC+01:00 (CET)
  - Summer (DST): UTC+02:00 (CEST)
- INSEE/Postal code: 27218 /27260
- ^{1} French Land Register data, which excludes lakes, ponds, glaciers > 1 km^{2} (0.386 sq mi or 247 acres) and river estuaries.

Épaignes (French pronunciation: [epɛɲ]) is a commune in the Eure department in northern France.

== Population ==
Historical population
Year	Pop.	±% p.a.
1968	947	—
1975	964	+0.25%
1982	1,029	+0.94%
1990	1,090	+0.72%
1999	1,158	+0.67%
2007	1,247	+0.93%
2012	1,434	+2.83%
2017	1,617	+2.43%
2023	1,597	−0.21%
Source: INSEE

== See also ==
- Communes of the Eure department
