= Marie Tamarelle-Verhaeghe =

French politician (born 1962)

Member of the National Assembly for Eure's 3rd constituency
- In office 21 June 2017 – 21 June 2022
- Preceded by: Hervé Morin
- Succeeded by: Kévin Mauvieux

Personal details
- Born: Marie Tamarelle; 27 September 1962 (age 63) Le Petit-Quevilly, France
- Party: La République En Marche! (2017–present)
- Other political affiliations: Union of Democrats and Independents (until 2017); Democratic Movement (2017)
- Profession: Physician

Marie Tamarelle-Verhaeghe (nee Tamarelle; born 27 September 1962) is a French physician and politician who represented the 3rd constituency of the Eure department in the National Assembly from 2017 to 2022. A member of La République En Marche! (LREM), she was elected to Parliament as a member of the Democratic Movement (MoDem).

== Political career ==
Tamarelle-Verhaeghe has served as a departmental councillor of Eure for the canton of Bourg-Achard since 2015. She held one of the departmental council's vice presidencies from 2015 to 2017.

When the Union of Democrats and Independents endorsed François Fillon of The Republicans as its candidate for the 2017 French presidential election, Tamarelle-Verhaeghe left the party in February 2017 and joined En Marche instead.

In Parliament, Tamarelle-Verhaeghe serves on the Committee on Social Affairs. In addition to her committee assignments, she is part of the French-Cameroonian Parliamentary Friendship Group and the French-Madagascar Parliamentary Friendship Group.

In 2020, Tamarelle-Verhaeghe joined the En Commun (EC) association led by Barbara Pompili within the Ensemble Citoyens alliance formed around the La République En Marche! party of President Emmanuel Macron.

In the 2022 French legislative election, she lost her seat to Kévin Mauvieux of the National Rally in the second round.

== Political positions ==
In July 2019, Tamarelle-Verhaeghe voted in favour of the French ratification of the European Union's Comprehensive Economic and Trade Agreement (CETA) with Canada.

Also in 2019, Tamarelle-Verhaeghe abstained from a vote on a bioethics law extending to homosexual and single women free access to fertility treatments such as in vitro fertilisation (IVF) under France's national health insurance; it was one of the campaign promises of President Emmanuel Macron and marked the first major social reform of his five-year term.

== Other activities ==
- National Institute for Cancer (INCa), Member of the Board of Directors (appointed in 2018)
