= Bruno Le Maire =

French politician (born 1969)

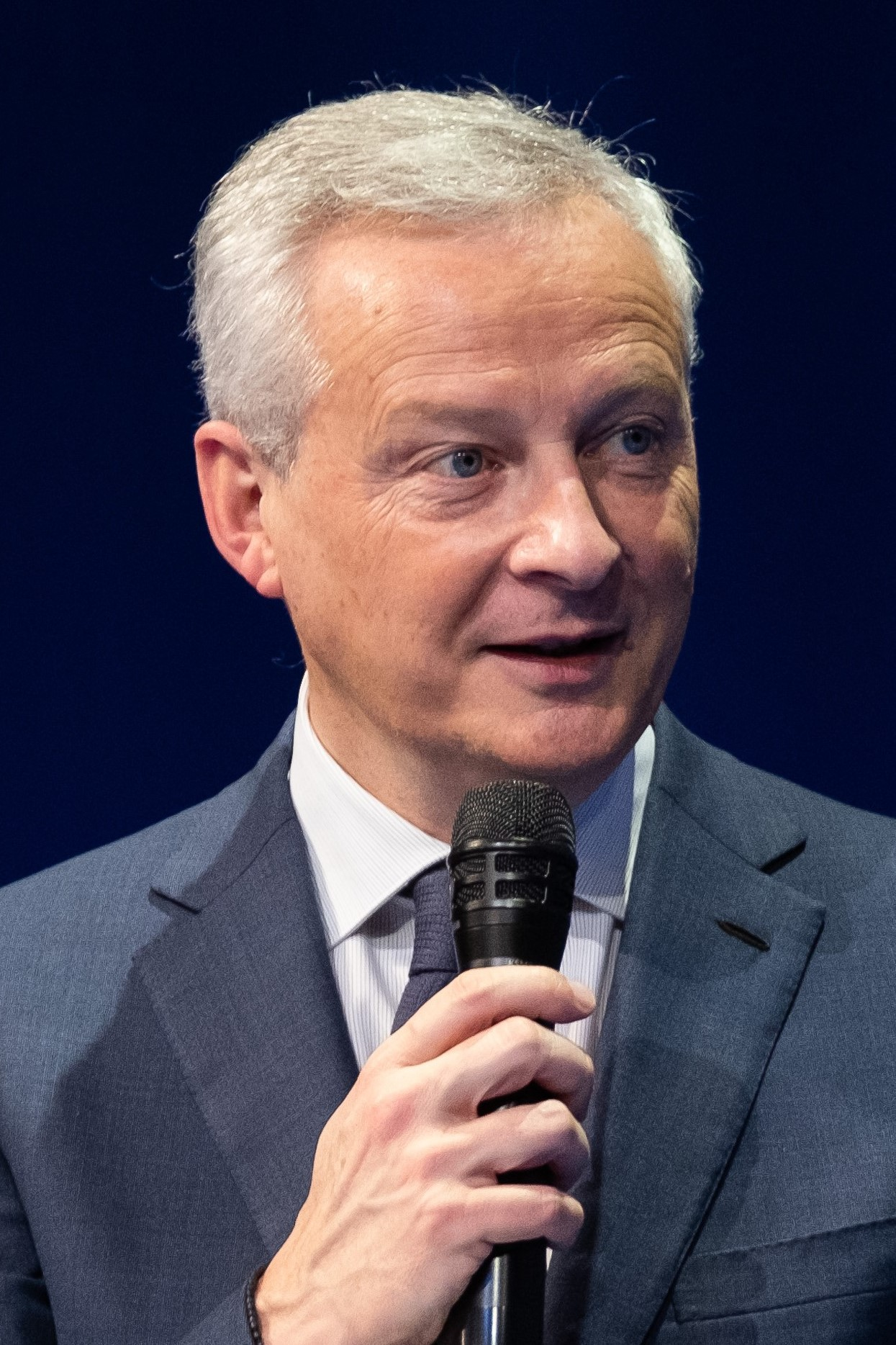
- Le Maire in 2022

Minister of State Minister of the Armed Forces and Veterans Affairs
- In office 5 October 2025 – 6 October 2025
- Prime Minister: Sébastien Lecornu
- Preceded by: Sébastien Lecornu
- Succeeded by: Sébastien Lecornu (interim); Catherine Vautrin

Minister of the Economy, Finance and Industrial and Digital Sovereignty
- In office 17 May 2017 – 21 September 2024
- Prime Minister: Édouard Philippe; Jean Castex; Élisabeth Borne; Gabriel Attal
- Preceded by: Michel Sapin
- Succeeded by: Antoine Armand

Minister of Agriculture, Food, Fishing, Rurality and Territorial Planning
- In office 23 June 2009 – 15 May 2012
- Prime Minister: François Fillon
- Preceded by: Michel Barnier
- Succeeded by: Stéphane Le Foll

Secretary of State for European Affairs
- In office 18 December 2008 – 23 June 2009
- Prime Minister: François Fillon
- Preceded by: Jean-Pierre Jouyet
- Succeeded by: Pierre Lellouche

Member of the National Assembly for Eure's 1st constituency
- In office 21 June 2017 – 21 July 2017
- Preceded by: Guy Lefrand
- Succeeded by: Séverine Gipson
- In office 20 June 2012 – 17 June 2017
- Preceded by: Guy Lefrand
- Succeeded by: Guy Lefrand
- In office 20 June 2007 – 13 January 2009
- Preceded by: Françoise Charpentier
- Succeeded by: Guy Lefrand

Personal details
- Born: Bruno Maurice Marie Le Maire; 15 April 1969 (age 57) Neuilly-sur-Seine, France
- Party: Renaissance (since 2017)
- Other political affiliations: UMP (before 2015); LR (2015–2017)
- Spouse: Pauline Doussau de Bazignan (m. 1998)
- Relations: Augustin de Romanet de Beaune (brother-in-law)
- Children: 4
- Education: Lycée Louis-le-Grand
- Alma mater: École normale supérieure Université Paris-Sorbonne; Sciences Po; École nationale d'administration

Bruno Maurice Marie Le Maire (French: [bʁyno l(ə) mɛʁ]; born 15 April 1969) is a French politician, writer and former civil servant who held a number of government positions from 2008 until 2025.

A former member of The Republicans (LR), which he left in 2017 to join La République En Marche! (LREM), Le Maire was Secretary of State for European Affairs from 2008 to 2009 and Minister of Food, Agriculture and Fishing from 2009 to 2012 under President Nicolas Sarkozy. From 2017 to 2024, he served as Minister of the Economy, Finance, Industrial and Digital Sovereignty under President Emmanuel Macron. In October 2025 Le Maire briefly served as Minister of the Armed Forces and Veterans Affairs. He was a candidate in The Republicans' 2016 presidential primary, placing fifth.

Le Maire is also a noted author, with his book Des hommes d'État winning the 2008 Edgar Faure Prize.

== Early life and education ==
Bruno Le Maire was born on 15 April 1969 in the Parisian suburb of Neuilly-sur-Seine. He is the son of Maurice Le Maire, an executive at the oil company Total, and Viviane Fradin de Belâbre, a headmistress of private Catholic schools, mainly Lycée Saint-Louis-de-Gonzague. Le Maire was educated at Lycée Saint-Louis-de-Gonzague until he obtained his baccalauréat.

Le Maire began attending the École normale supérieure in 1989, and then Paris-Sorbonne University, where he studied French literature. He graduated from Sciences Po in 1995, and was accepted into the École nationale d'administration (ÉNA) in 1996.

Bruno Le Maire is married to painter Pauline Doussau de Bazignan, who is the mother of his four sons. His wife was employed as his parliamentary assistant from 2007 to 2013.

Le Maire is fluent in French, English, Italian and German.

== Career ==
=== Early beginnings ===
After leaving the ÉNA in 1998, Bruno Le Maire joined the Ministry of Foreign Affairs. He eventually was recruited to the team assisting the Secretary General of the Office of the President, Dominique de Villepin. He went on to a role of Foreign Affairs advisor in the ministry in 2002, then onto an advisor role in the Interior Ministry in 2004.

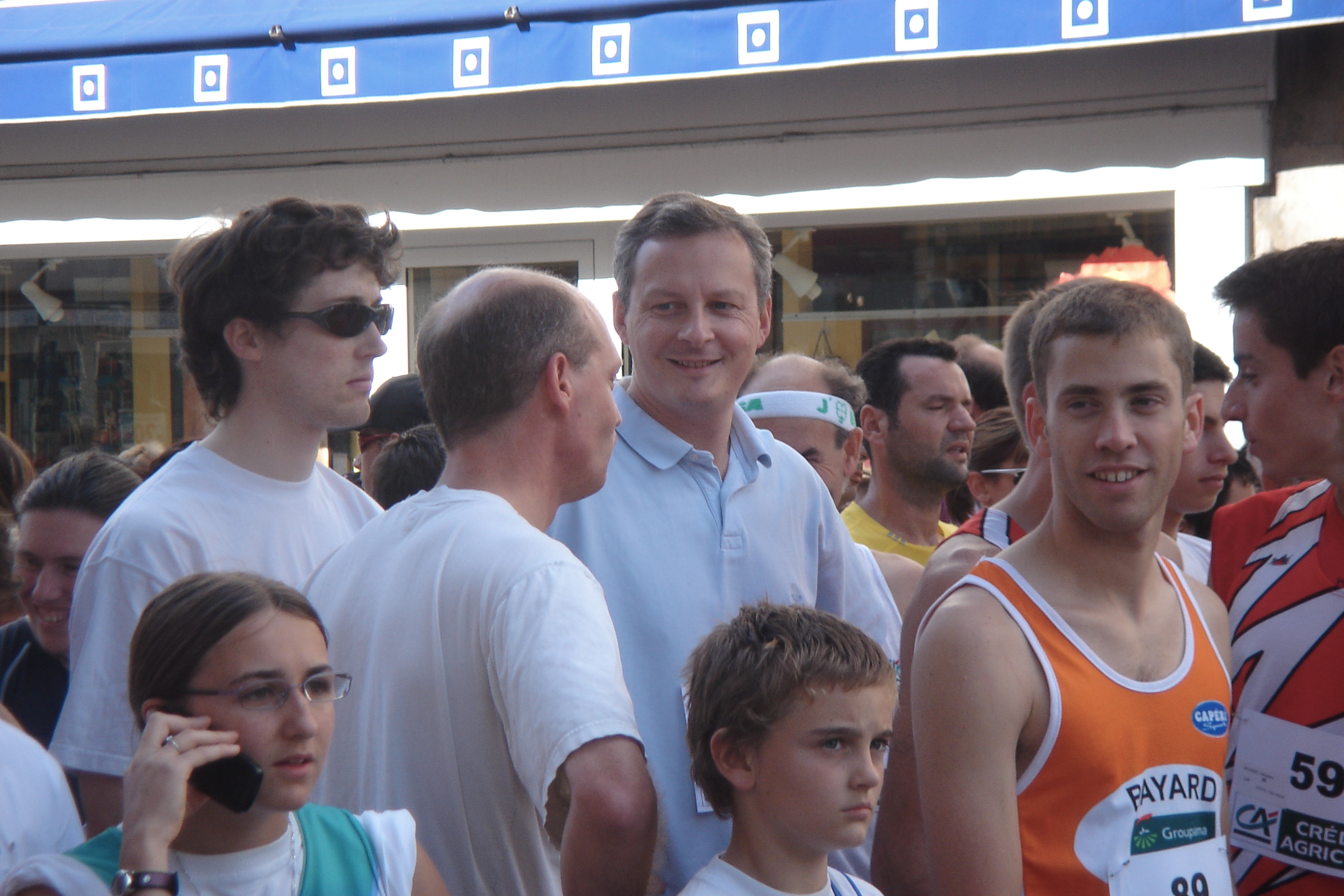
Bruno Le Maire in 2007

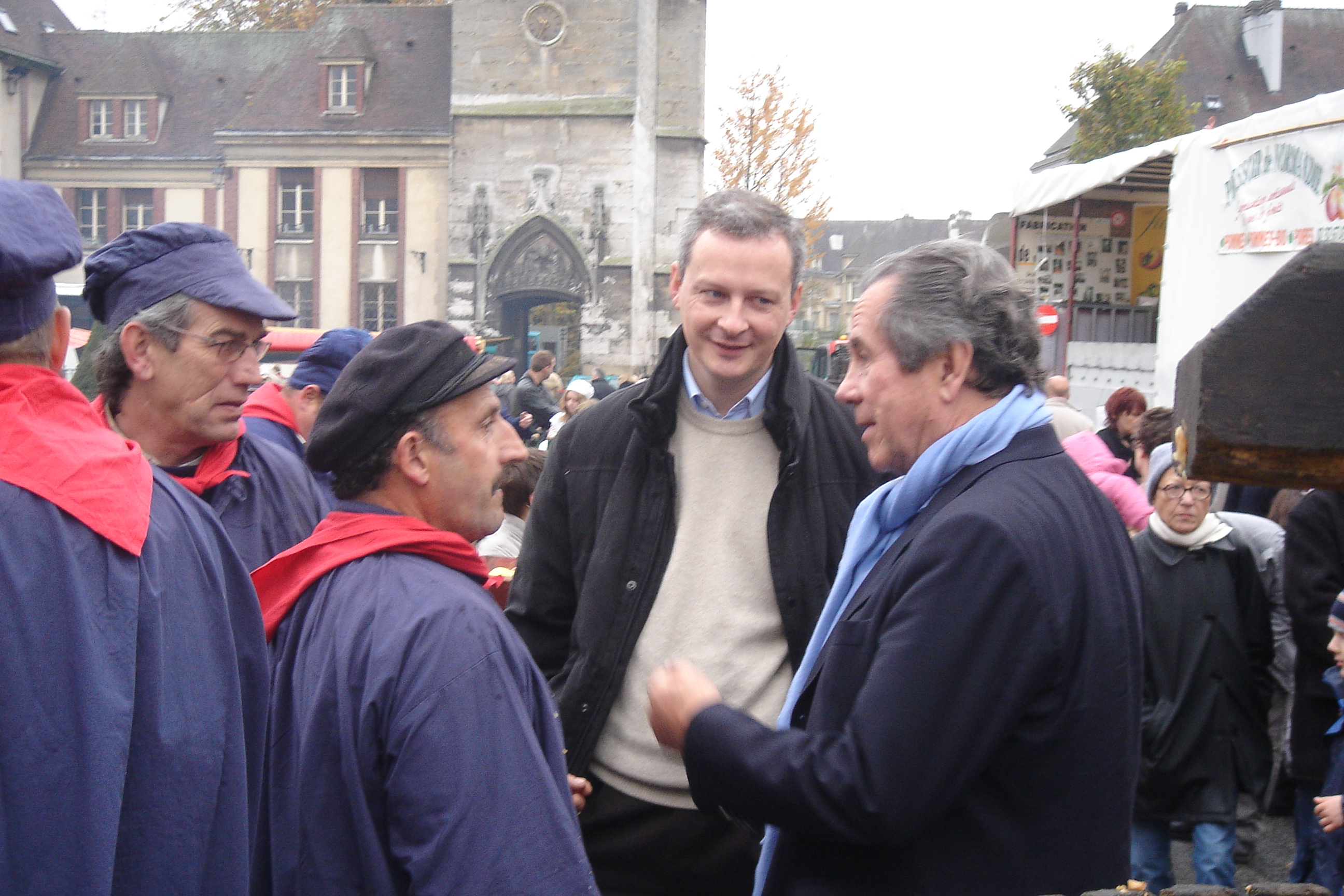
Le Maire talking with Jean-Louis Debré and his constituents in Évreux

Following several roles in government, including one working directly with Dominique de Villepin, Le Maire was chosen to be political advisor to the Prime Minister. In July 2006, Le Maire was appointed to the office of Chief of Staff to the Prime Minister, replacing Pierre Mongin; he remained in the role until De Villepin's departure from the office of Prime Minister.

From 2007 to 2008, he was a member of the National Assembly, representing the 1st constituency of Eure. After becoming a political advisor to the Union for a Popular Movement (UMP), Le Maire was appointed Secretary of State for European Affairs, replacing Jean-Pierre Jouyet, in December 2008, serving until 2009.

From 2008, Le Maire served as a political advisor for the UMP, and a municipal councillor of Évreux.

=== Minister of Food, Agriculture and Fishing, 2009–2012 ===
In June 2009, Le Maire became the new Minister of Food, Agriculture and Fishing in the government of François Fillon. During his tenure at the Ministry, he created a new framework to modernise French agriculture, food and fishing. He also hosted the G20 Agriculture summit in 2011, which resulted in the creation of AMIS (Agricultural Market Information System). The main objective of AMIS is to monitor the global agricultural market under a rotating presidency. An intervention Forum can be convened if the presiding country judges it necessary.

=== Candidacies for leadership roles ===
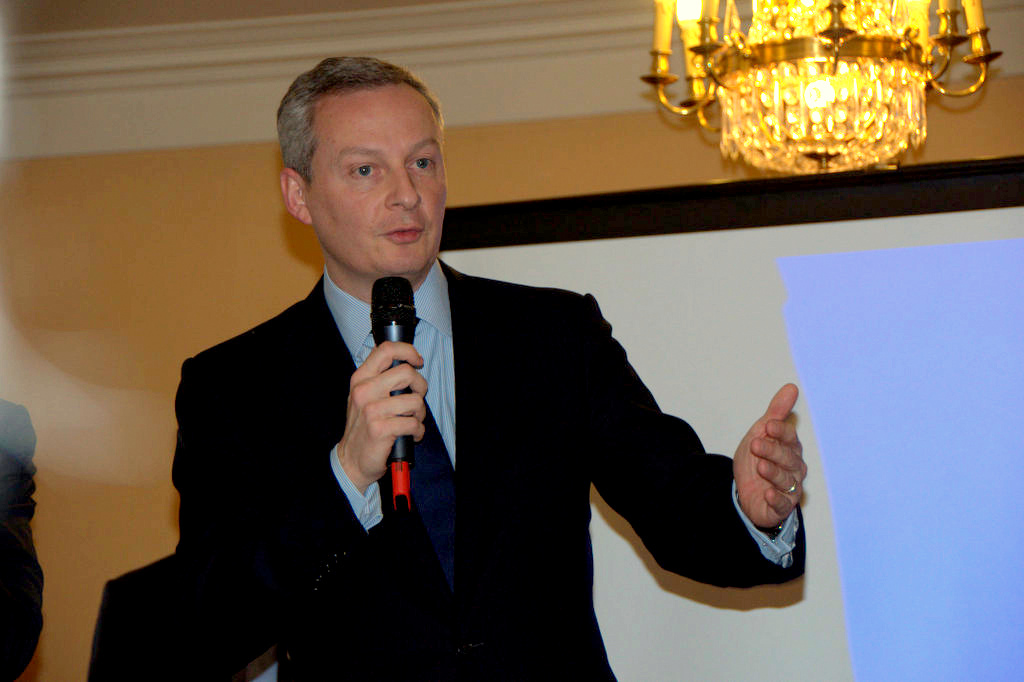
Bruno Le Maire speaking at a public event in 2013

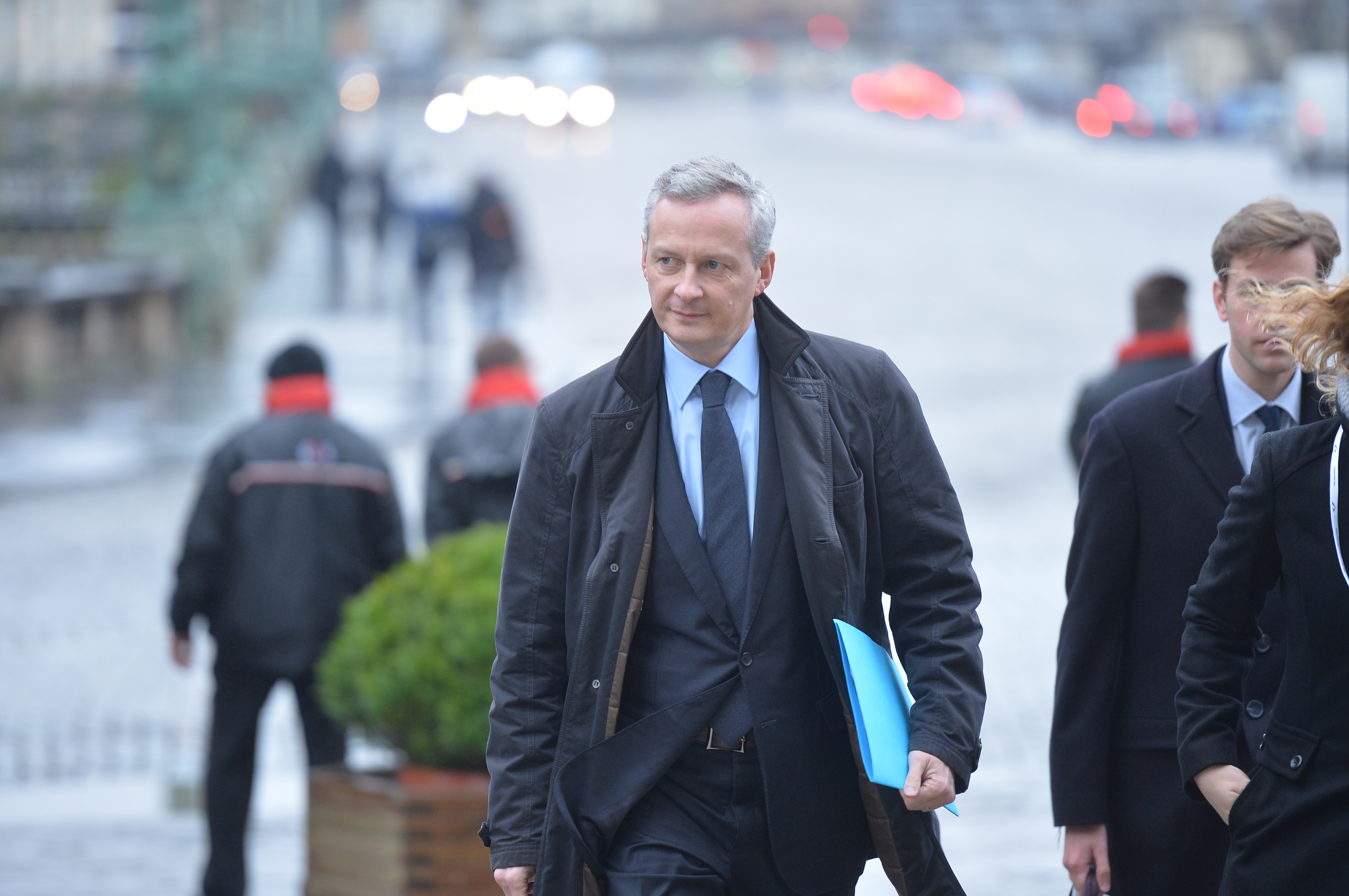
Le Maire in Brussels, 2014

In August 2012, Le Maire announced that he would be a candidate for the presidency of the Union for a Popular Movement, competing against former Prime Minister François Fillon, Secretary General Jean-François Copé and former Minister of Ecology Nathalie Kosciusko-Morizet. He decided to develop a reformist line and to focus his campaign around four main axes: enhancing European economic integration; strengthening French entrepreneurship and the economy; going back to the values of respect and authority in society; renewing generations in political parties. However he failed to obtain the necessary number of sponsors in the leadership election.

In November 2014, Le Maire obtained 29.8% of the vote against Nicolas Sarkozy in the election for the presidency of the UMP (renamed The Republicans in 2015).

Le Maire was considered a serious challenger in the 2016 centre-right presidential primary as the polls suggested he could be third-placed; he finished with a poor showing at 2.4% of the vote. He became LR candidate François Fillon's international affairs spokesman, but resigned when Fillon was embroiled in a financial scandal during his campaign. Le Maire has since distanced himself from his party, calling for the right to work constructively with Macron to ensure the president's five years in office succeeds and prevents the far-right National Front making further electoral inroads.

On 17 May 2017, The Republicans Secretary-General Bernard Accoyer issued a statement that anyone from the party that was a member of the government was no longer a member, including Le Maire.

=== Minister of the Economy and Finance, 2017–2024 ===
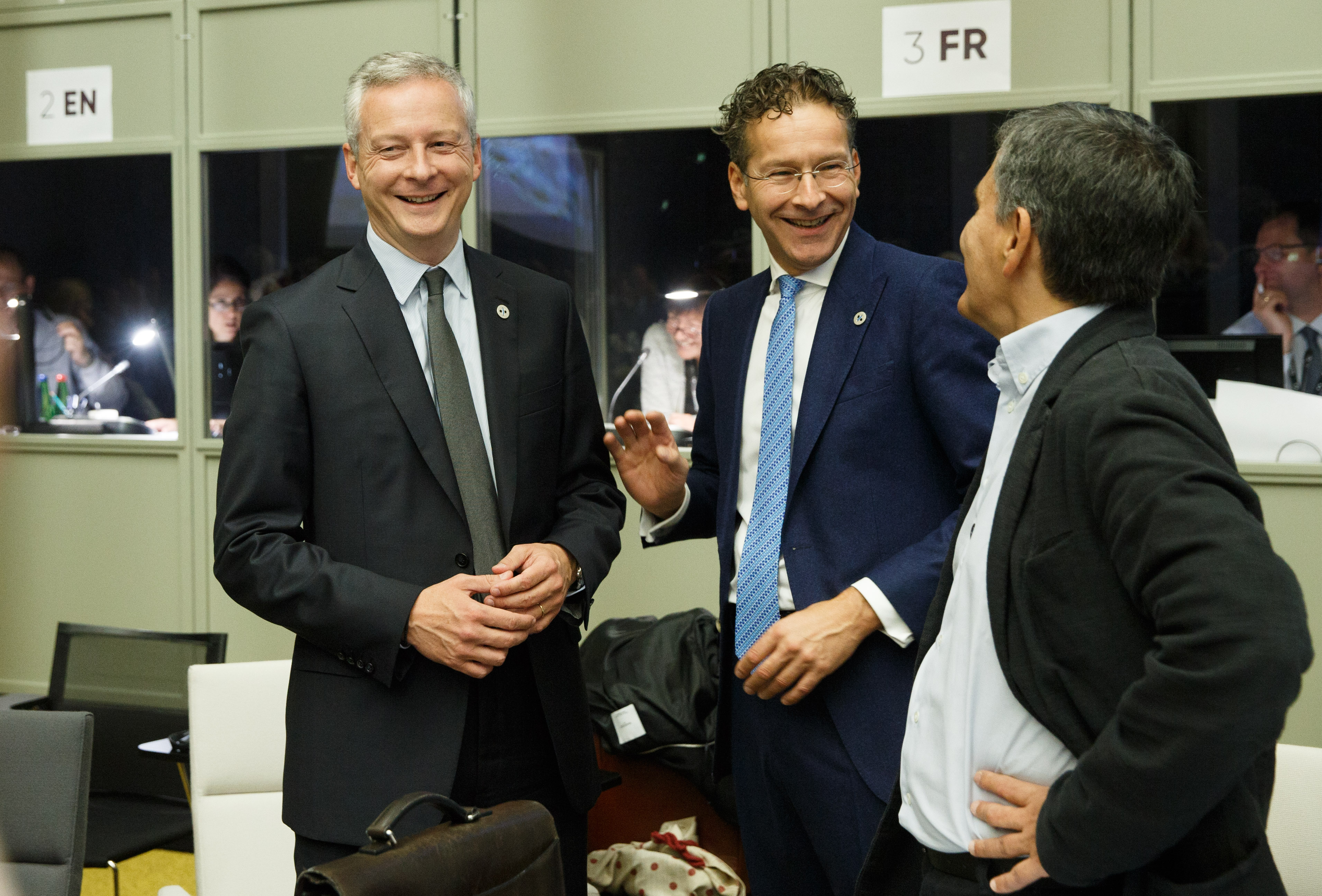
Bruno Le Maire (left), Eurogroup President Jeroen Dijsselbloem (centre) and Greek Minister of Finance Euclid Tsakalotos (right), 2017

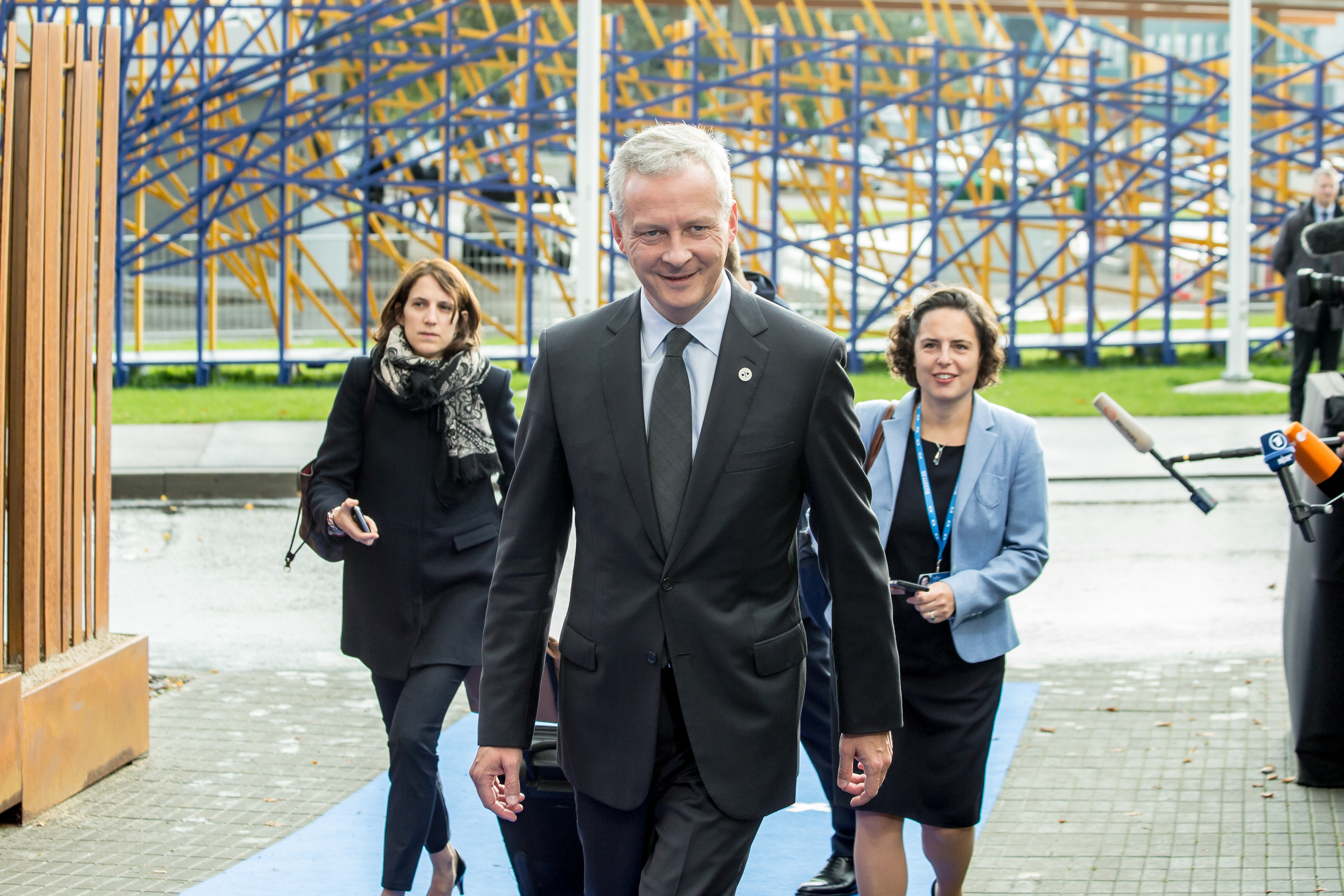
Le Maire arriving at an Economic and Financial Affairs Council meeting in September 2017

In May 2017, Le Maire was appointed by President Emmanuel Macron Minister of the Economy in the first Philippe government. In this capacity, he is supported by Budget Minister Gérald Darmanin. Shortly after being appointed as the Minister of the Economy, Le Maire became a member of La République En Marche! following conflicting reports that he was excluded from The Republicans party. Le Maire was able to win reelection in his constituency after beating National Front candidate, Fabienne Delacour. He was appointed Minister of the Economy and Finance in the second Philippe government on 19 June 2017.

By November 2017, Le Maire was reported to explore his options to succeed Jeroen Dijsselbloem as the next President of the Eurogroup; the role of which was eventually given to Mário Centeno of Portugal. In 2019, he led the European Union's selection process for a European candidate to succeed Christine Lagarde as managing director of the International Monetary Fund.

On 5 June 2022, Le Maire said that France negotiated with the United Arab Emirates to replace some oil imports from Russia.

In September 2023, Le Maire took part in one of the German cabinet's weekly meetings, chaired by Chancellor Olaf Scholz. In October 2023, he participated in the first joint cabinet retreat of the German and French governments in Hamburg, chaired by Scholz and Macron.

On 21 September 2024, when the ministers of the Barnier government were announced, he was replaced by Antoine Armand as economy and finance minister, ending his 7-year and 4-month tenure.

=== Minister of the Armed Forces and Veterans Affairs, 2025 ===
On 5 October 2025, Le Maire was appointed Minister of State, Minister of the Armed Forces and Veterans Affairs in the first Lecornu government. His appointment was criticised as he was deemed responsible for France's budgetary deficit as a longtime former Finance Minister; faced with criticism, he resigned after only 1 day in office.

== Other activities ==
=== European Union organisations ===
- European Investment Bank (EIB), ex officio member of the Board of Governors
- European Stability Mechanism (ESM), member of the Board of Governors

=== International organisations ===
- Asian Development Bank (ADB), ex officio member of the Board of Governors
- Asian Infrastructure Investment Bank (AIIB), ex officio member of the Board of Governors
- European Bank for Reconstruction and Development (EBRD), ex officio member of the Board of Governors
- Inter-American Investment Corporation (IIC), ex officio member of the Board of Governors
- International Monetary Fund (IMF), ex officio member of the Board of Governors
- Joint World Bank-IMF Development Committee, Member
- Multilateral Investment Guarantee Agency (MIGA), World Bank Group, ex officio member of the Board of Governors
- World Bank, ex officio member of the Board of Governors

=== Non-profit organisations ===
- European Council on Foreign Relations (ECFR), member
- Hertie School of Governance, member of the Board of Trustees
- Long-Term Investors Club, member
- Permanent Platform of Atomium Culture, member of the Advisory Board

=== Speakers bureaus ===
- Washington Speakers Bureau, exclusive speaker

== Political positions ==
=== Domestic policy ===
During the conservative primaries in 2016, Le Maire shifted to the right, taking a tough stance on law and order and national identity issues. He called for the immediate expulsion of foreigners regarded as suspect by the security services, the deportation of foreign nationals who complete jail terms, and a curb on refugee numbers.

=== Economic policy ===
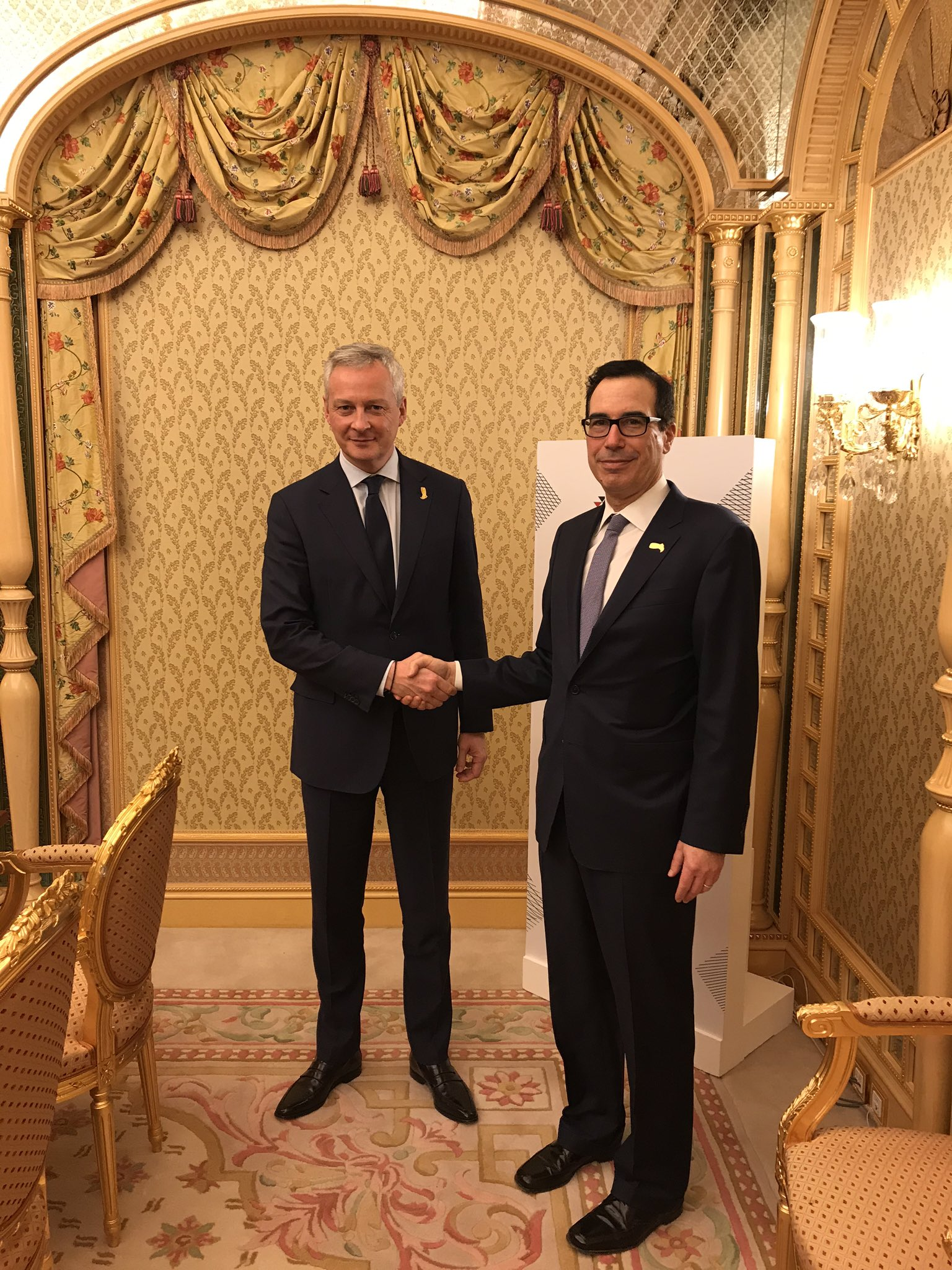
Le Maire and US Treasury Secretary Steven Mnuchin at the G20 Riyadh Summit in Saudi Arabia, 2020

Le Maire has set out a free-market economic agenda, calling for the privatisation of France's labour offices, the end of subsidised jobs and the capping of welfare benefits. Since taking office, he has steered Macron's drive to lighten the government's touch on the economy and cut red tape, and is overseeing a push to privatise airports and other state-controlled companies.

In 2016, however, Le Maire was quoted as saying the prospect of Britain leaving the European Union was a "fabulous opportunity for France" as it would remove the bloc's main champion of deregulation. He vowed on 9 July 2017 to put forward a plan to protect French companies from foreign takeovers.

On foreign trade, Le Maire expressed his opposition against the Transatlantic Trade and Investment Partnership (TTIP) and also argued for a more protectionist trade policy in order to better defend against "dumping" by China.

In August 2017, Le Maire called upon EU nations to step up efforts to address how they tax the digital economy and stated that a "new momentum" was needed to get a fairer contribution from digital platforms, after a report that Airbnb paid less than €100,000 in taxes in France in 2016. He categorised low tax payments as "unacceptable".

Amid the COVID-19 pandemic, Le Maire and his German counterpart Olaf Scholz were credited as instrumental in overcoming Dutch and Italian resistance and securing the EU's 500 billion euros emergency deal to provide financial aid to workers, companies and governments struggling as a result of the virus.

In July 2020, Le Marie announced that the French government will cut taxes French companies have to pay in addition to normal corporate income tax by 20 million euros over the course of the next two years.

=== Brexit ===
On Brexit itself, Le Maire caused controversy on 20 July 2017 when he told the French Parliament's economic affairs committee: "The United Kingdom has a remaining balance to pay to the EU budget of €100 billion". The view held by Le Maire has been shared by European Leaders since April 2017 with some of them believing the "divorce-bill" will lead the UK to owing the European Union £50 billion He also promised to set up a special court to handle English-law cases for financial contracts after Brexit during a conference in New York.

Speaking to the BBC in January 2019, Le Maire said the Brexit withdrawal agreement could not be renegotiated and it was up to the UK to find a way through the impasse. He also said a no-deal Brexit would be "catastrophic" for the UK.

=== Foreign policy ===
On foreign policy, Le Maire is a traditional Gaullist, favouring French national independence. He has argued for a reinforced European defence policy to secure the bloc's exterior borders and fight terrorism, with more spending on the military by Germany in particular.

In February 2019, Le Maire criticized Germany's ban on arms sales to Saudi Arabia. Le Maire said: "It is useless to produce weapons through improved cooperation between France and Germany if we are unable to export them." Germany imposed the ban after the assassination of Saudi journalist Jamal Khashoggi and over human rights concerns about the Saudi Arabian–led intervention in Yemen.

On 1 March 2022, Le Maire warned that the EU "will bring about the collapse" of the Russian economy. He said France rejected Russia's demand that foreign buyers must pay in rubles for Russian gas from 1 April, adding that "we are preparing" for a "situation tomorrow in which ... there is no longer any Russian gas."

== Controversy ==
In 2019, Le Maire received several letters containing death threats, including one with bullets enclosed.

In 2021, Reuters reported that Le Maire's phone was investigated to determine whether it had been infected by a spyware known as Pegasus.

In 2023, his novel Fugue Américaine, about the pianist Vladimir Horowitz, was criticised, notably for its inclusion of an explicit sex scene, in the French media. He was accused of spending his time writing while the country was rocked by social tension.

== Personal life ==
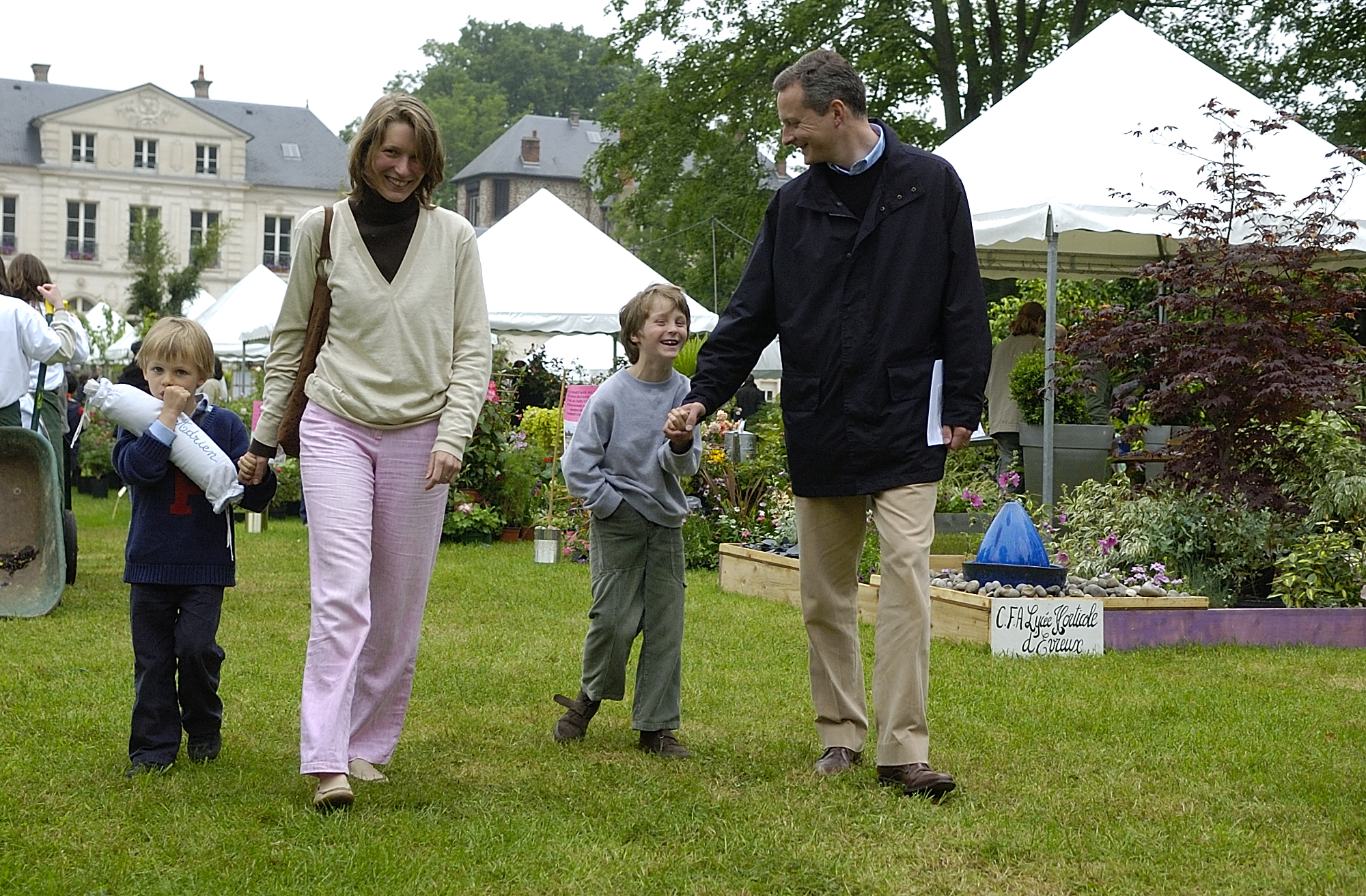
Bruno Le Maire and his family, 2007

Le Maire is married to Pauline Doussau de Bazignan. They have four children. The family has a holiday home in Saint-Pée-sur-Nivelle.

== Depictions in film ==
In the film La Conquête (The Conquest), released in 2011 about Nicolas Sarkozy's career, he was played by Emmanuel Noblet.

Le Maire briefly appeared in Bertrand Tavernier's film The French Minister (2013) as himself.

== Honours ==
=== French honours ===
- France: Officer of the Légion d'honneur (2025)
- France: Commander of the Ordre du Mérite Maritime (2009)
- France: Commander of the Ordre du Mérite Agricole ex officio as Minister of Agriculture

=== Foreign honours ===
- Denmark: Commander 1st Class of the Order of the Dannebrog (2018)
- Germany: Knight Commander of the Order of Merit of the Federal Republic of Germany (2022)
- Senegal: Commander of the National Order of the Lion (2019)

=== Others ===
- "Humour and Politics Prize" awarded by the Press Club of France (2016)

== Bibliography ==
- Le Ministre. Éditions Grasset, 2004
- Des hommes d'Etat. Éditions Grasset, 2007 (2008 Edgar Faure Prize)
- Jours de pouvoir. Éditions Gallimard, 2013
- Fugue américaine. Éditions Gallimard, 2023

Political offices
| Preceded by Jean-Pierre Jouyet | Secretary of State for European Affairs; 2008–2009 | Succeeded by Pierre Lellouche |
| Preceded by Michel Barnier | Minister of Food, Agriculture and Fishing; 2009–2012 | Succeeded by Stéphane Le Foll |
| Preceded by Michel Sapin | Minister of the Economy and Finance; 2017–2024 | Succeeded by Antoine Armand |
| Preceded by Sébastien Lecornu | Minister of the Armed Forces; 2025 | Succeeded by Sébastien Lecornu; Interim |
