= Sébastien Lecornu =

Prime Minister of France since 2025

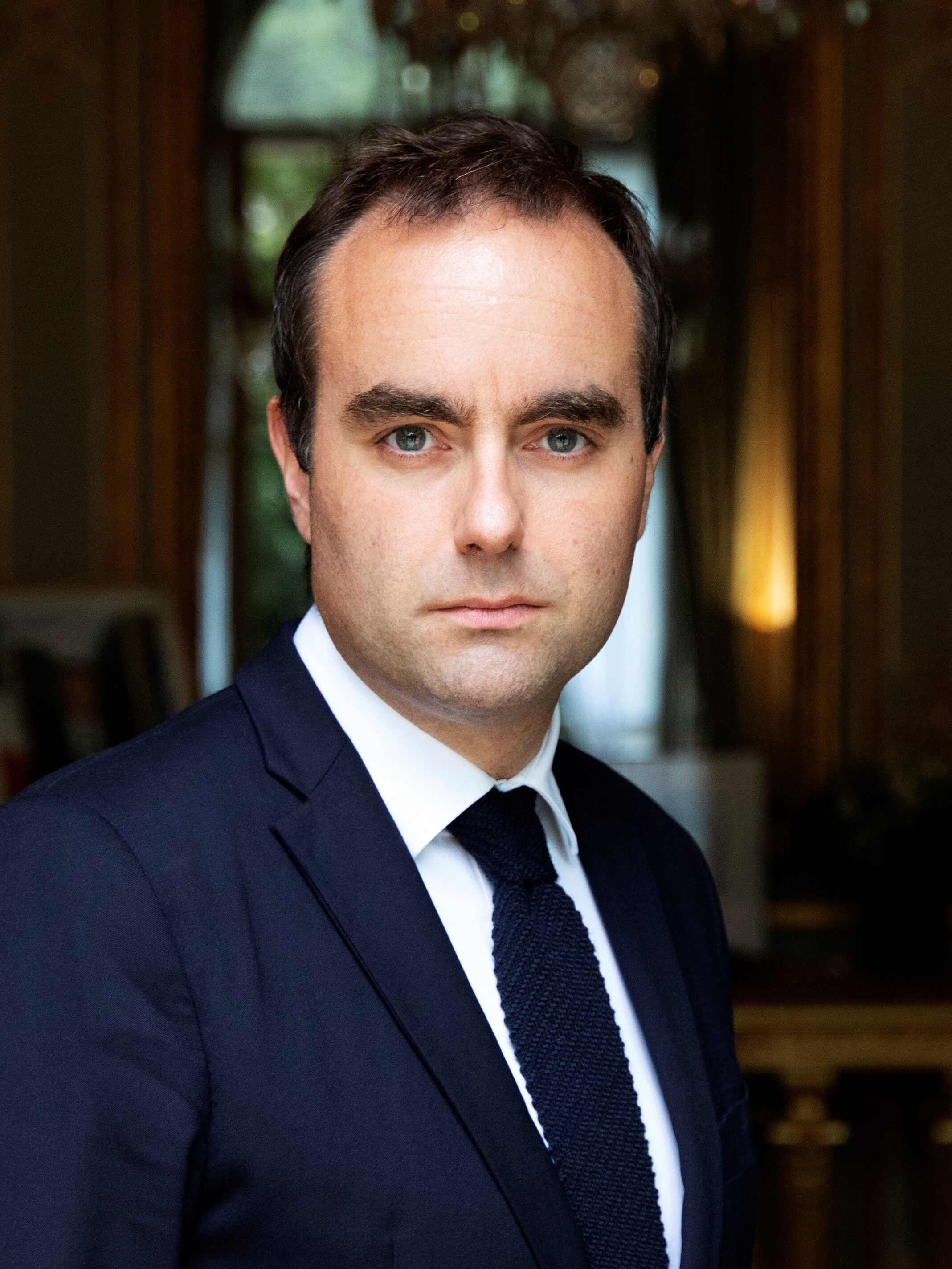
- Official portrait, 2022

Prime Minister of France
- Incumbent
- Assumed office 9 September 2025 (Note: Lecornu initially resigned as PM on 6 October 2025 and served in a caretaker capacity until his reappointment four days later, on 10 October.)
- President: Emmanuel Macron
- Preceded by: François Bayrou
Ministerial positions
Minister of the Armed Forces
Interim; 6 October 2025 – 12 October 2025
Prime Minister	Himself
Preceded by	Bruno Le Maire
Succeeded by	Catherine Vautrin
In office 20 May 2022 – 5 October 2025
Prime Minister	Élisabeth Borne; Gabriel Attal; Michel Barnier; François Bayrou
Preceded by	Florence Parly
Succeeded by	Bruno Le Maire
Minister of the Overseas
In office 6 July 2020 – 20 May 2022
Prime Minister	Jean Castex
Preceded by	Annick Girardin
Succeeded by	Yaël Braun-Pivet
Minister for Local Authorities
In office 16 October 2018 – 6 July 2020
Prime Minister	Édouard Philippe
Preceded by	Estelle Grelier (2017)
Succeeded by	Jacqueline Gourault
Secretary of State to the Minister of the Ecological and Inclusive Transition
In office 21 June 2017 – 16 October 2018
Prime Minister	Édouard Philippe
Preceded by	Position established
Succeeded by	Emmanuelle Wargon

President of the Departmental Council of Eure
- In office 1 July 2021 – 16 December 2022
- Preceded by: Pascal Lehongre
- Succeeded by: Alexandre Rassaërt
- In office 2 April 2015 – 10 July 2017
- Preceded by: Jean-Louis Destans
- Succeeded by: Pascal Lehongre

Senator for Eure
- In office 1 October 2020 – 1 November 2020
- Succeeded by: Nicole Duranton
Local offices
Vice-President of Seine Normandie Agglomération
In office 18 April 2014 – 3 November 2020
President	Gérard Volpatti; Frédéric Duché
Succeeded by	François Ouzilleau
Mayor of Vernon
In office 5 April 2014 – 4 December 2015
Preceded by	Philippe Nguyen Thanh
Succeeded by	François Ouzilleau

Personal details
- Born: Sébastien Pierre Thierry Lecornu; 11 June 1986 (age 40) Eaubonne, France
- Party: Renaissance (since 2017)
- Other political affiliations: UMP (2002–2015); LR (2015–2017)
- Education: Panthéon-Assas University
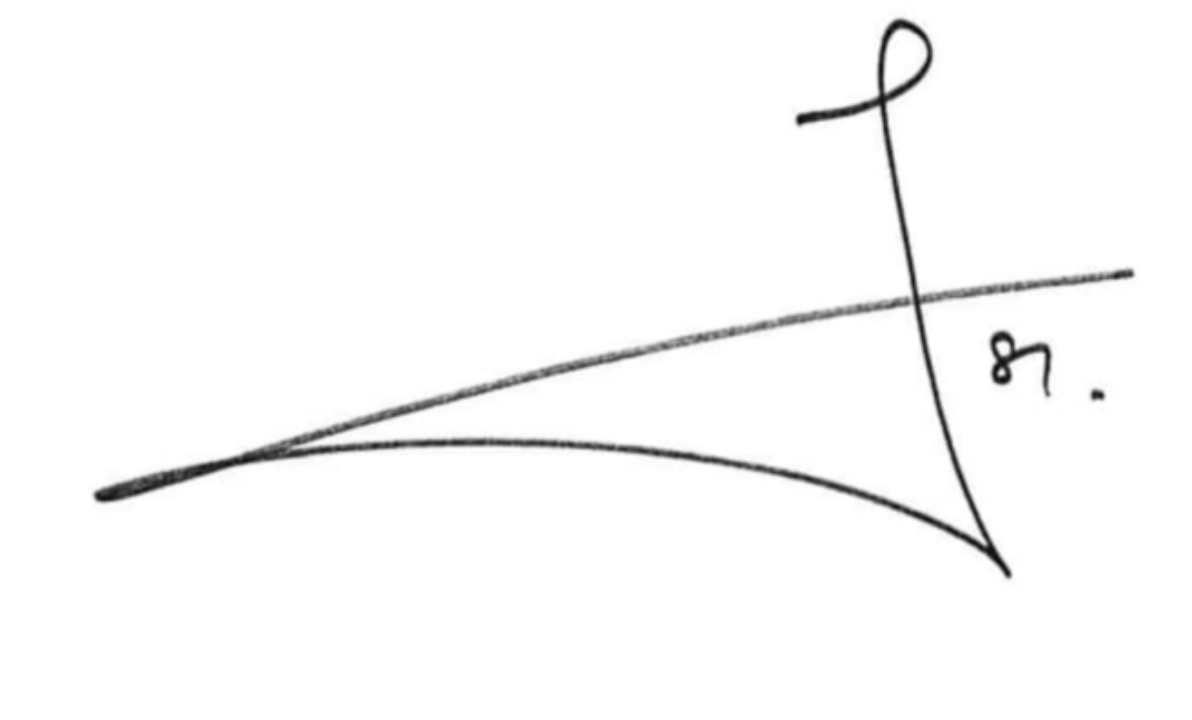
- Signature

Sébastien Pierre Thierry Lecornu (French pronunciation: [sebastjɛ̃ ləkɔʁny]; born 11 June 1986) is a French politician who has served as Prime Minister of France since September 2025. Positioned on the right of the ideological political spectrum, Lecornu has promoted Gaullist, Séguinist, and socially conservative beliefs.

Since leaving The Republicans (LR) in 2017, Lecornu has been a member of Renaissance (RE). Lecornu was president of the Departmental Council of Eure from 2015 to 2017. In government, he served as secretary of state to the minister of the ecological and inclusive transition (2017–2018), minister for local authorities (2018–2020), minister of the overseas (2020–2022) and minister of the armed forces (2022–2025).

On 9 September 2025, Lecornu was appointed as prime minister by Emmanuel Macron after the Bayrou government was brought down by a vote of no confidence in the National Assembly. He unveiled his cabinet 26 days after being nominated and resigned hours later, making his first government the shortest-lived in the history of the French Fifth Republic. He remained in office as a caretaker prime minister until he was reappointed by President Macron on 10 October 2025.

== Early life and education ==
Sébastien Pierre Thierry Lecornu was born on 11 June 1986 in Eaubonne, Val-d'Oise department, to Jean-Pierre Lecornu, an aeronautical technician at the Safran Aircraft Engines factory in Vernon, and Martine Rousseau, a medical secretary. Close to his Gaullist grandfather, a former resistance fighter and former vice-president of a chamber of commerce in Calvados, he was passionate about the army and politics and initially wanted to become a soldier. He also tried monastic life at the Abbey of Saint-Wandrille.

He completed his secondary studies at the private Catholic institution Saint-Adjutor de Vernon. Holder of a baccalauréat in economics and social sciences, he obtained a law degree and then began an unfinished master's degree in public law at the Panthéon-Assas University. His curriculum vitae, however, stated he had obtained that degree.

In 2002, Lecornu became an activist in the Union for a Popular Movement (UMP), joined the Young Right of the Vernon region (JDV), then campaigned during the campaign for the 2004 regional elections.

In 2005, he became a parliamentary assistant to Franck Gilard, the member of the National Assembly for Eure's 5th constituency; Lecornu was, at the time, the youngest parliamentary assistant in the National Assembly. In 2008, he became an advisor to Secretary of State for European Affairs Bruno Le Maire; at age 22 Lecornu was the youngest advisor to an official in the government of prime minister François Fillon.

He is a member of the National Gendarmerie operational reserve with the rank of lieutenant. He was appointed colonel as a reserve specialist in the fall of 2017.

== Political career ==
=== Career in local politics ===
In the 2014 municipal election, Lecornu was elected Mayor of Vernon.

The combination of two executive mandates being incompatible, he abandoned the town hall of Vernon on 4 December 2015.

Following the 2015 departmental elections in which he was elected councillor for the canton of Vernon alongside Catherine Delalande, Lecornu became President of the Departmental Council of Eure.

Lecornu has highlighted his refusal to raise taxes and rigorous management of public money. Mediapart points out that the hunt for RSA fraudsters has been – with great communication support – the flagship policy pursued by the department since the arrival of Lecornu. Another flagship policy was closing two priority education colleges, which was justified by their low occupancy rates.

=== Secretary of state ===
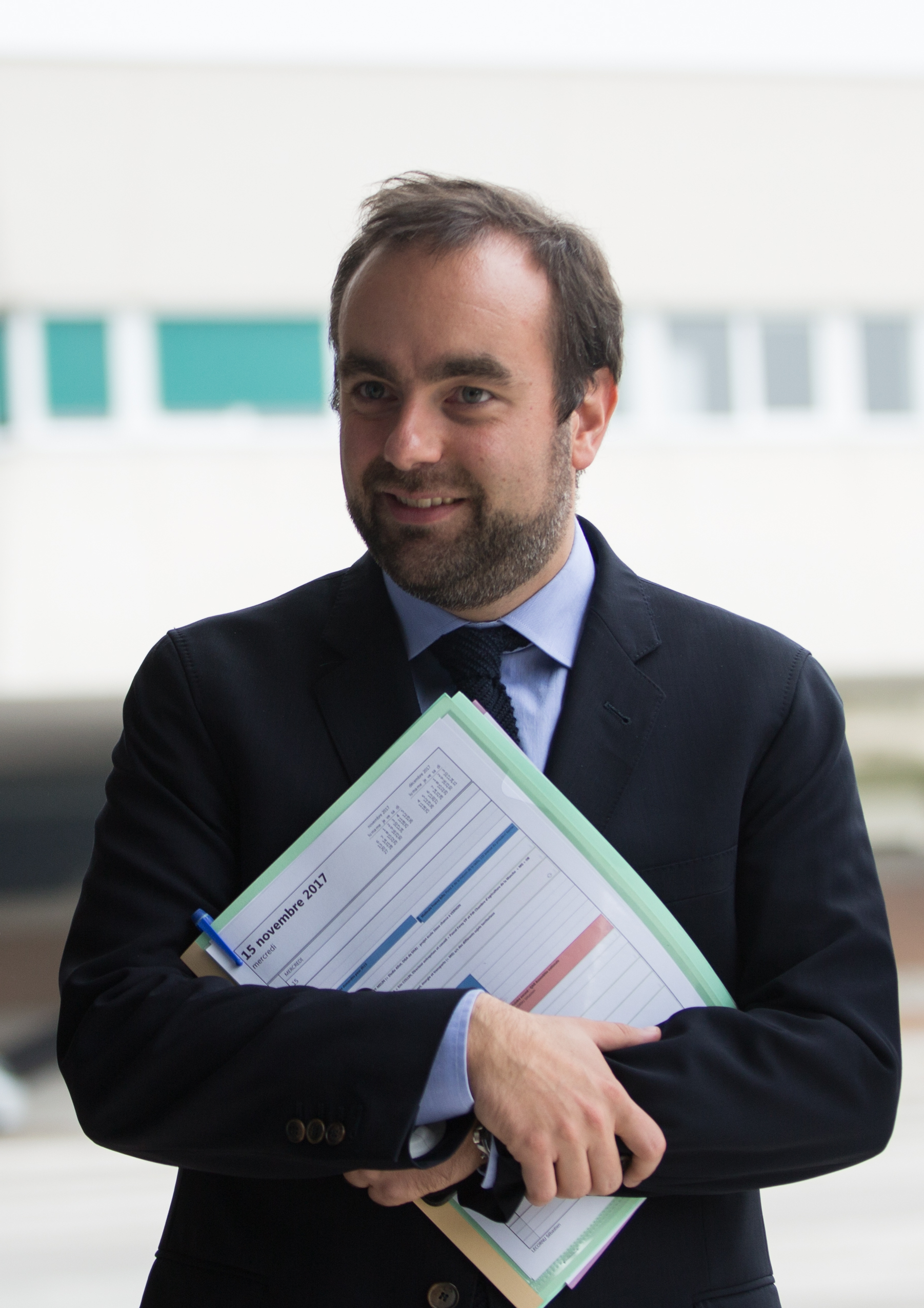
Lecornu in 2017

In 2017, Lecornu was appointed to be a secretary of state to the minister for the ecological and inclusive transition by President Emmanuel Macron.

Lecornu was then suspended from his duties within The Republicans by the party and disciplinary exclusion proceedings were brought against him. He was excluded from LR on 31 October 2017, with Gérald Darmanin, also a member of the government, and the members of the National Assembly, Franck Riester and Thierry Solère. He then joined La République en marche.

Nicolas Hulot delegated issues related to energy in general to Lecornu. In particular, he was entrusted with several sensitive files such as the closure of the Fessenheim Nuclear Power Plant, the opening of the Flamanville's EPR, or the Cigeo nuclear waste landfill project in Bure.

=== Minister of local authorities ===
On 16 October 2018, Lecornu was appointed minister of local authorities to the minister of territorial cohesion and relations with local authorities, Jacqueline Gourault.

On 14 January 2019, Lecornu was appointed with Emmanuelle Wargon to lead the "great national debate", organised in order to get out of the crisis caused by the yellow vests movement.

=== Minister of the overseas ===
On 6 July 2020, Lecornu was appointed minister of the overseas in the Castex government. In this capacity, he held crisis talks on the French Caribbean territory of Guadeloupe in late 2021, in an effort to defuse tensions amid unrest stemming from the government's handling of the COVID-19 pandemic there. He also announced that France would be willing to discuss autonomy for Guadeloupe.

Elected senator for Eure in September 2020, he left his seat to Nicole Duranton, as he had announced before his election, after a period of one month after entering the Luxembourg Palace. Affected by the accumulation of mandates, he resigned from his mandate as deputy mayor, which he had held since 2015, and from the municipal council of Vernon, on 3 November 2020; this resignation also led to his departure from the community council of the Seine Normandie Agglomeration.

A candidate for re-election in the canton of Vernon during the 2021 departmental elections, he came out on top in the first round with 58.74% of the votes cast, but the high abstention rate did not allow him to be directly elected. He was re-elected in the second round with 81.11% of the votes. To everyone's surprise, while still minister of overseas territories, he resumed the presidency of the Eure departmental council, obtaining the 39 votes of the majority, contrary to the practice established by Lionel Jospin in 1997 of not combining an executive mandate with a government function; he was authorized to do so "for a time" by Emmanuel Macron and Jean Castex.

=== Minister of the armed forces ===
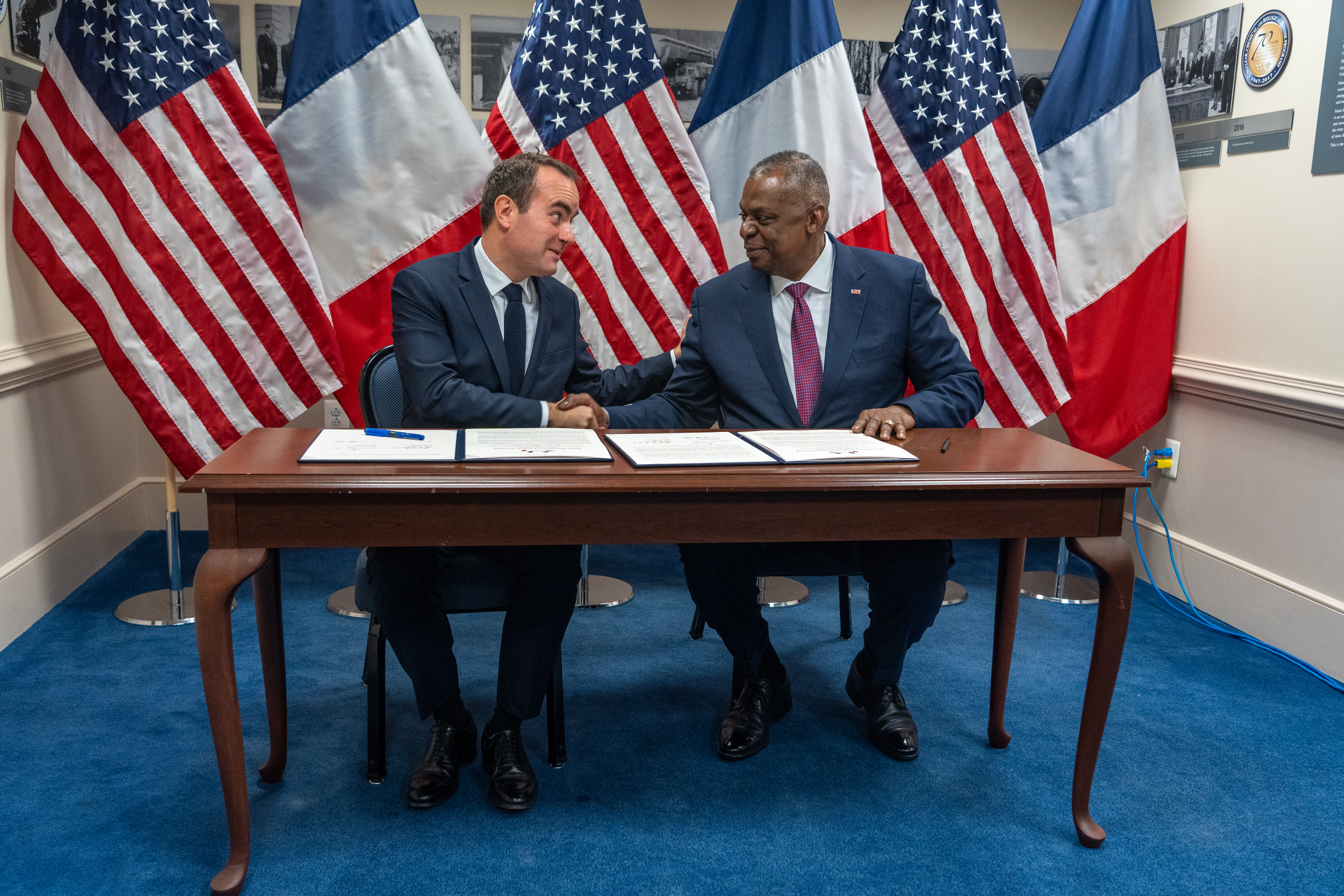
Lecornu with US Secretary of Defense Lloyd Austin in 2022

On 20 May 2022, Lecornu was appointed minister of the armed forces in the Borne government.

==== International crises ====
Early in his tenure, Lecornu and Minister of Foreign Affairs Catherine Colonna travelled to Niger together to seal a regional redeployment, making the country the hub for French troops in the Sahel region.

After Ukraine was invaded by Russia in 2022 and NATO allies were in the midst of supplying arms to Ukraine, Lecornu stated at the end of December 2022 in an official visit to Kyiv that the two problems of maintenance and training were the reason for which the Leclerc tanks would stay at home. There were other troubling signs that all was not well with the effort to aid Ukraine. For example, although the CAESAR mobile artillery system had proven very useful to the June 2022 bombardment and recapture of Snake Island and dominated the battle elsewhere, the Ukrainians were having difficulty with the maintenance of the 18 systems and the solution was problematic. Ukrainian defence minister Oleksiy Reznikov hoped that French tradesmen could be sent to Ukraine to service the artillery pieces.

==== Military procurements ====
In December 2022, Lecornu and Mariusz Błaszczak signed an agreement between France and Poland on the 575 million euros ($611.69 million) sale of two Airbus Defence and Space observation satellites to Poland.

In April 2023, he presented the Military Programming Law (LPM), which is to apply from 2024 to 2030, and provides for 413 billion euros of military spending over the seven years of the fiscal year. The annual budget will thus increase from 32 billion in 2017 to 69 billion euros in 2030, a doubling of funding for the armed forces. This budget must notably cover investments in the French nuclear arsenal, the construction of a new aircraft carrier and the increase in the number of armed forces. The government also plans to raise the age limit for reservists to 70, whereas it is currently between 62 and 65, with the objective of providing the armed forces with 300,000 soldiers, including 100,000 reservists. The intelligence services should also see their budget increase by 60%.

In March 2024, Lecornu announced that Les Forges de Tarbes would henceforth have the capacity to produce 4,000 artillery shells per month. It produced 1,000 per month as of February 2022, the start of the Russian invasion of Ukraine. Also in March 2024, according to Lecornu, the Russian war machine was able to fire between 10,000 and 15,000 shells per day in Ukraine war.

In July 2024, Lecornu and his counterparts from Germany, Italy and Poland signed a letter of intent to develop ground-launched cruise missiles with a range beyond 500 km (310 miles).

=== Prime minister (2025–present) ===
Lecornu was appointed prime minister on 9 September 2025 by President Emmanuel Macron. He succeeded François Bayrou, who was forced to resign on the same day following the failure of a vote of confidence in the National Assembly the day before.

Shortly after his appointment, Le Figaro and Paris Match revealed that Lecornu had visited former president Nicolas Sarkozy at his offices in the 8th arrondissement of Paris, who assured him of his friendship and support.

On 13 September 2025, in an interview with the regional daily press, he announced that he would abandon the abolition and reinstating of the two public holidays, an unpopular measure sought by his predecessor François Bayrou. Two days later, he announced the end of "lifetime benefits" for former members of the government as of 1 January 2026.

On 6 October 2025, Lecornu unveiled a cabinet that was similar to previous governments. He resigned hours later amidst threats across the political spectrum to oust him. Macron then tasked Lecornu with 48-hour talks to stabilise the government. Lecornu also assumed the role of the minister of the armed forces on an interim basis after Bruno Le Maire resigned after only a few hours in office. On 10 October 2025, Macron reinstated Lecornu as prime minister, resulting in similar criticism.

On 10 October Lecornu was reappointed by Emmanuel Macron as prime minister, four days after having resigned. He stated that he had accepted "out of a sense of duty" and asserted that he wanted to form a "new government team" which, according to him, would "embody renewal and the diversity of skills".

On 14 October, during his general policy statement amid internal conflicts with left-wing and right-wing politicians, he said he had "accepted the mission because France needs a budget, because there are emergency measures to be taken without delay", promised a "serious and reliable budget for France, useful and good for the French, within three months", and announced that he would propose "to Parliament this autumn that we suspend the 2023 pension reform until the presidential election" and that "no increase in the age will take place from now until January 2028".

In an address before the National Assembly, Lecornu said he supported the suspension of pension reforms until after the 2027 presidential election, which led the Socialists to pledge its support for him against a no-confidence motion. This led to Lecornu surviving two successive no-confidence motions filed by La France Insoumise and the National Rally respectively on 16 October.

His government narrowly passed a budget for social security for 2026 in a 247–234 vote in the National Assembly on 9 December.

Lecornu announced in January 2026 that he would invoke Article 49.3 of the constitution to force through the remaining 2026 budget, despite refusing to do so earlier. He faced confidence votes from La France Insoumise and the National Rally, which were both unsuccessful with 269 and 142 votes in favour respectively, falling short of a majority. Lecornu secured the support of the Socialist Party after making concessions on more social housing and €1 lunches for university students.

== Political positions ==
Lecornu described himself as "rather Gaullist, Séguinist, fundamentally right-wing", as well as "liberal and European", while Le Monde described him in 2022 as "not really liberal or all that souverainist", allowing himself to be "sucked in by the identity temptations of the right, while knowing how to make himself appreciated on his left flank".

Against what he calls l'excuse sociale ('the social excuses'), he threatened in 2016 to not proceed with the increase to the Revenu de solidarité active (RSA) decided by Manuel Valls's team as part of the government's plan to combat poverty, and denounced a "clientelism that reeks of old-fashioned politics".

Sébastien Lecornu opposed same-sex marriage in 2012. Declaring that "gay communitarianism frustrates [him] as much as homophobia", he added that "marriage is the basis for building a family in our societies. And a family is built between a man and a woman". In 2015, he spoke out against surrogacy and medically assisted procreation, before issuing an apparently contradictory opinion in 2019.

Presented as the president's unofficial "Mr. Hunter" at the beginning of Emmanuel Macron's first term, he defended traditional hunting as secretary of state to the minister of the ecological and inclusive transition, and lowered the price of the national hunting permit.

== Controversies ==
=== Lavrilleux affair ===
In September 2023, during Lecornu's term as minister of the armed forces, journalist Ariane Lavrilleux spent 39 hours in police custody and had her home searched for leaking information to the press about a secret Franco–Egyptian military operation. This is considered by Mediapart to be a "serious breach of the confidentiality of sources". However, Lecornu has never "expressed any regret" over this affair.

=== French arms exports to Israel ===
In the context of the Gaza war, Mediapart and Disclose are investigating the €30 million in French arms exports to Israel. Questioned on this subject by the Foreign Affairs Committee, Sébastien Lecornu questioned the rigor of these media outlets and refused to answer the former's questions. Amnesty International France deplored the lack of transparency in arms export controls under his tenure as minister, recalling that he opposed the creation of a new extra-parliamentary commission to evaluate exports of war materials and goods for civilian and military use. According to Mediapart, Sébastien Lecornu never "assumed the need to impose an embargo on French arms sales to Israel, even as accusations of war crimes and then genocide in Gaza were becoming more precise".

Lecornu publicly stated that France does not sell weapons to Israel, but exports components used in the Iron Dome, which protects civilian populations, as well as elements subsequently assembled in Israel and re-exported, notably for use by the French Armed Forces. To support his statements, he declassified a document in June 2025, which he submitted to parliamentarians. Three months later, however, Mediapart published an article reporting on the ministry's latest report on arms exports from France. According to the article, "orders from Israel amounted to €27.1 million in 2024", partially contradicting the minister's statements.

=== Lunches with Marine Le Pen ===
In April 2025, Lecornu met with Marine Le Pen several times in private meetings, at the home of his friend Thierry Solère or in his office at the Ministry of the Armed Forces. His entourage acknowledged that one of these discussions concerned the war in Ukraine, even though, as Mediapart notes, the National Rally was funded by Russia.

== Honours ==
=== National honours ===
- Grand Cross of the National Order of Merit (2026)
- Knight of the Order of Agricultural Merit (2012)
- Knight of the Order of Arts and Letters (2017)
- National Defence Medal, bronze with Gendarmerie nationale clasp (2015)
- Medal for Voluntary Military Service, silver (2017)
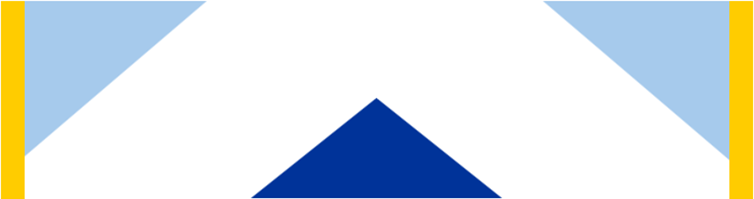
- Medal of Honor for Overseas Commitment, gold (2022)

=== Foreign honours ===
- Medal of the Order of Honour (Armenia, 2026)
- Commander of the Order of the Star of Mohéli (Comoros, 2021)
- Commander First Class of the Order of the Dannebrog (Denmark, 2025)
- Grand Cross of the Order of Merit of the Federal Republic of Germany (Germany, 2024)
- Grand Officer of the National Order of the Cedar (Lebanon, 2021)
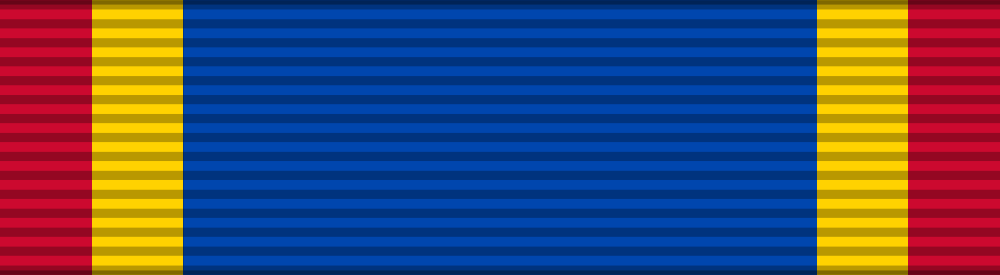
- Medal of the Order of Honour (Moldova, 2025)
- Knight of the Order of Saint Charles (Monaco, 2023)
- Commander of the National Order of the Lion (Senegal, 2023)
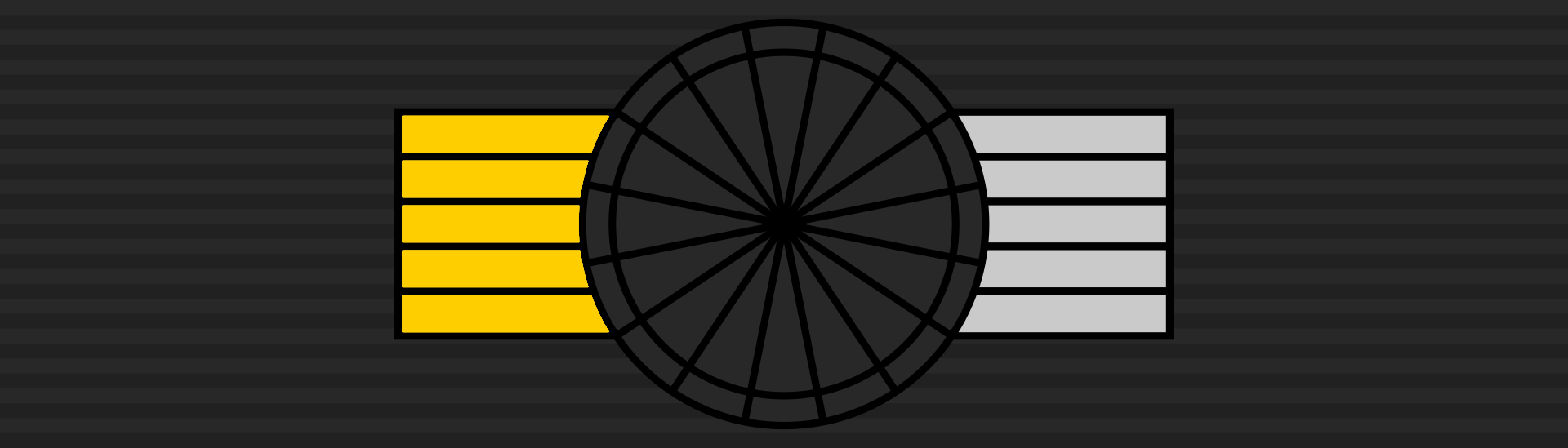
- Commander First Class of the Royal Order of the Polar Star (Sweden, 2024)
- First Class of the Order of Merit (Ukraine, 2025)
- Grand Cordon of the Order of Zayed (United Arab Emirates, 2022)

== Notes ==
Political offices
Vacant Title last held by Estelle Grelier	Minister for Local Authorities; 2018–2020	Succeeded by Jacqueline Gourault
Preceded by Annick Girardin	Minister of the Overseas; 2020–2022	Succeeded by Yaël Braun-Pivet
Preceded by Florence Parly	Minister of the Armed Forces; 2022–2025	Succeeded by Bruno Le Maire
Preceded by François Bayrou	Prime Minister of France; 2025–present	Incumbent
Preceded by Bruno Le Maire	Minister of the Armed Forces; Interim; 2025	Succeeded by Catherine Vautrin
Order of precedence
Preceded by Emmanuel Macron as President of the Republic	Order of precedence in France; Prime Minister	Succeeded by Gérard Larcher as President of the Senate
