= Alfred Recours =

French politician (1945–2025)

Deputy of the French National Assembly for Eure's 2nd constituency
- In office 12 June 1997 – 18 June 2002
- Preceded by: Catherine Nicolas
- Succeeded by: Jean-Pierre Nicolas
- In office 23 June 1988 – 1 April 1993
- Preceded by: Claude Michel (1986)
- Succeeded by: Catherine Nicolas

Member of the Departmental Council of Eure for the Canton of Conches-en-Ouche
- In office 20 March 2011 – 27 June 2021
- Preceded by: Claude Auffret
- Succeeded by: Claire Lacampagne-Crochet

Mayor of Conches-en-Ouche
- In office 1984 – 23 May 2020
- Preceded by: Paul Gilbaud
- Succeeded by: Jérôme Pasco

Personal details
- Born: 19 March 1945 Mostaganem, French Algeria
- Died: 1 April 2025 (aged 80)
- Party: LCR (until 1976); PS (1976–2019); RE (2019–2025)
- Occupation: Educational inspector

Alfred Recours (19 March 1945 – 1 April 2025) was a French politician of the Socialist Party (PS).

== Life and career ==
Recours served as Mayor of Conches-en-Ouche from 1984 to 2020 and was a deputy of the National Assembly from 1988 to 1993 and again from 1997 to 2002. He also represented the Canton of Conches-en-Ouche in the Departmental Council of Eure from 2011 to 2021. In 2017, he endorsed Emmanuel Macron in the presidential election.

Recours died on 1 April 2025, at the age of 80.

== Distinctions ==
- Knight of the Legion of Honour (2013)
- Officer of the Ordre national du Mérite (2021)
