= Fabien Gouttefarde =

French politician

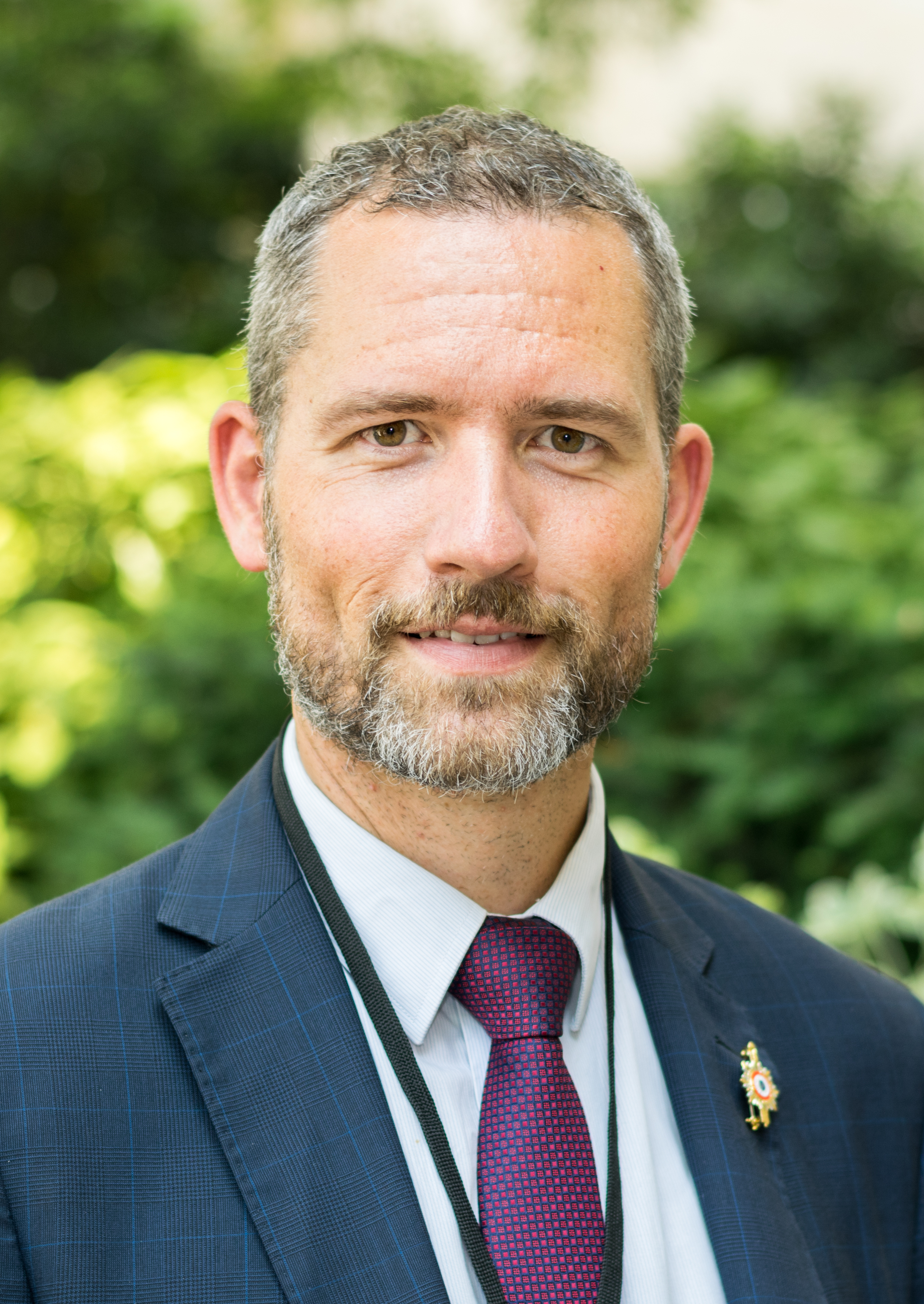
- Fabien Gouttefarde in 2017

Member of the National Assembly for Eure's 2nd constituency
- In office 21 June 2017 – 21 June 2022
- Preceded by: Jean-Louis Destans
- Succeeded by: Katiana Levavasseur

Personal details
- Born: 27 September 1978 (age 48) Versailles, France
- Party: La République En Marche!
- Education: Paris-Sud University; Sciences Po
- Profession: Legal counsel

Fabien Gouttefarde (born 27 September 1978) is a French lawyer and politician of La République En Marche! (LREM) who has been serving as member of the French National Assembly between 2017 and 2022, representing the 2nd constituency of Eure.

== Early life ==
Gouttefarde completed a doctorate in public international law in University of Paris-Sud and Montréal before joining the Ministry of Defense in 2007 as a lawyer specializing in the law of armed conflict. Between 2011 and 2013 he was the European Parliament's correspondent for the legal affairs department of this Ministry. In 2013, he served legal counsel for the National Veterans Board (ONAC). He also handles through this body the compensation of victims of terrorism.

Gouttefarde is also operational reserve officer, on the Évreux airbase. He leads Defence and Citizenship Day.

== Political career ==
Since September 2016, Gouttefarde has been a member of the movement En Marche! in the department of Eure.

=== Member of the National Assembly ===
Gouttefarde was elected to the French National Assembly on 18 June 2017, representing the 2nd constituency of Eure.

In the National Assembly, Gouttefarde is a member of the Defense Committee. He is a member of the mission of information on the universal national service. He is a President of France-Yemen Friendship Group and Vice-President of France-Canada Friendship Group.

In addition to his committee assignments, Gouttefarde has been a member of the French delegation to the Parliamentary Assembly of the Council of Europe since 2017. In this capacity, he serves on the Committee on Migration, Refugees and Displaced Persons; the Sub-Committee on Artificial Intelligence and Human Rights; and the Sub-Committee on Diasporas. Since 2020, he has been the Assembly's rapporteur on the protection of victims of forced displacement under international law.

== Political positions ==
In July 2019, Gouttefarde decided not to align with his parliamentary group’s majority and became one of 52 LREM members who abstained from a vote on the French ratification of the European Union’s Comprehensive Economic and Trade Agreement (CETA) with Canada.

In late 2019, Gouttefarde was one of 17 members of the Defense Committee who co-signed a letter to Prime Minister Édouard Philippe in which they warned that the 365 million euro ($406 million) sale of aerospace firm Groupe Latécoère to U.S. fund Searchlight Capital raised “questions about the preservation of know-how and France’s defense industry base” and urged government intervention.

== See also ==
- 2017 French legislative election
