= Claire O'Petit =

French politician

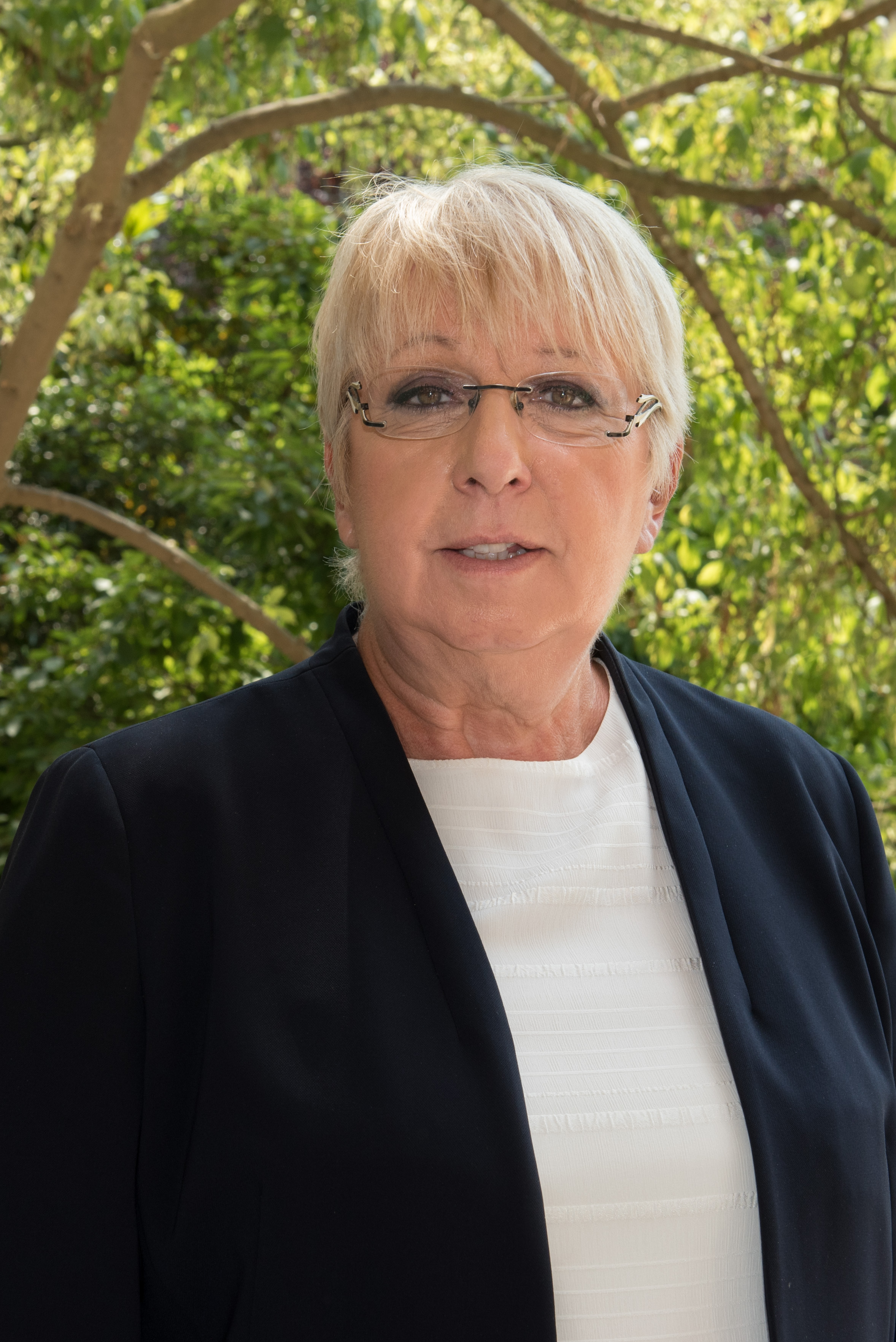

Member of the National Assembly for Eure's 5th constituency
- In office 21 June 2017 – 21 June 2022
- Preceded by: Franck Gilard
- Succeeded by: Timothée Houssin

Personal details
- Born: Clairette O'Petit; 15 October 1949 (age 76) Épinay-sur-Seine, France
- Party: PS (2000-2001); UDF; MoDem (2007-2015); LREM (2017-2022)
- Children: 1
- Profession: Retailer

Clairette Hélène Marceline O'Petit (born 15 October 1949) is a French politician representing La République En Marche! She was elected to the French National Assembly on 18 June 2017, representing the 5th constituency of the department of Eure.

== Biography ==
=== Early life and education ===
Claire O'Petit was born in Épinay-sur-Seine, located in the department of Seine-Saint-Denis where she remained during her youth. Her mother was a cook and member of the PCF, who left the party following the liberation, horrified by the fate reserved to the "shaved women" (women whose hairs were shaved in public because of suspected "horizontal collaboration" (having sex with German occupants) with the enemy), though remaining member of CGT.

Incumbent of a French professional in sewing, she worked most of her life as retailer, and started working at 17 until she retired. She held several types of job: shoe retailer on the Champs-Élysées, dog grooming, paramedic, sales representative, washing machine retailer, commercial for household appliances, etc.

=== Career and early political involvement ===
She then completed a professional training and became business manager for a paramedical company, opening a dog grooming salon at the same time in Saint-Denis in the 1990s. After demonstrating against local tax on small shop and retailers assessed excessively in comparison to neighbouring cities, she got involved in activities for defense of local commercants and craftsmen defense in local structure. She chaired a retailers and craftsmen association from 1989 to her election as member of parliament.

=== Media ===
Between 2005 and 2017, Claire O'Petit is a recurrent speaker at the French TV show Les Grandes Gueules on French channel RMC. She was notably noticed for her recurrent calls during the show, regularly lambasting taxes when still in office at her association. She intervenes on the set once or twice a week. Following her election, she only intervenes few times a month as a commentator.

== Business and legal issues ==
=== Condemnation for mismanagement ===
On 2 November 2016, Claire O'Petit is condemned by the Tribunal de commerce (France) of Bobigny to "une interdiction de diriger, gérer, administrer ou contrôler directement ou indirectement toute entreprise commerciale ou artisanale […] pour une durée de cinq ans" (a five-years ban on directing, managing, administering or directly or indirectly controlling any commercial or craft enterprise), court judging her guilty of mismanagement causing bankruptcy of the ADCP company. She appealed the verdict.

On 19 October 2017, the Court of Appeal of Paris partially confirm the first verdict, but reimbursement of troop costs are invalidated by the court.

== Political engagement ==
=== Socialist party and Modem ===
In 2001, Claire O'Petit is elected as a mayor candidate for the French socialist party aux 2001 French municipal elections in Épinay-sur-Seine. She then resigned after 6 months in office to show an opposition to political alliance between PS and PCF.

She then joined the UDF, and later the MoDem. In 2008, she stands for the MoDem at the 2008 French municipal elections in Saint-Denis, obtaining 7,46 % of ballots.

In 2012, Claire O'Petit runs for MoDem to the 2012 French legislative election in Eure's 5th constituency. She won only 1,63 % of ballots. In 2015, she left the party because of disagreements with the party cadre.

=== LREM MP ===
Claire O'Petit stands for LREM to the 2017 French legislative election, again in Eure's 5th constituency. Her nomination raise controversies among supporters because she held comments against minorities and professions which are in contradiction with the party's values. Thanks to high abstention, she won 28,56 % of the ballots after the first round, and is elected with 55,98 % of ballots against FN's candidate Vincent Taillieu.

== Controversies ==
In November 2012, O'Petit provoked controversy by pronouncing anti-Muslim expressions on RMC: "Frankly speaking, when I see a bearded man wearing a djellaba crossing the street at red-light, I just want to accelerate I say."

Newspapers notice her little participation to debates during her first months as MP. She responded stating that her absence was due to heath issues

In 2019, she took position against the reduction of the number of MP, resolution advocated by her own party.

In July 2017, she openly mocked complaints of opponents to cuts in housing benefits aimed to help students, assumed to finance the suppression of Impôt de solidarité sur la fortune saying: "If at 19 years old, 20 years old, 24 years old you start weeping because we remove to your purse 5 euros, what're you gonna do of your life ?". She added: "We must either cuts in expenses or we raise taxes [...] There're no free money, everyone must participate."

She also declared "Socialists are primary racists and serve out arabics."
