= Normandy (administrative region) =

Normandy Normandie (French) Normaundie (Norman)
- Region
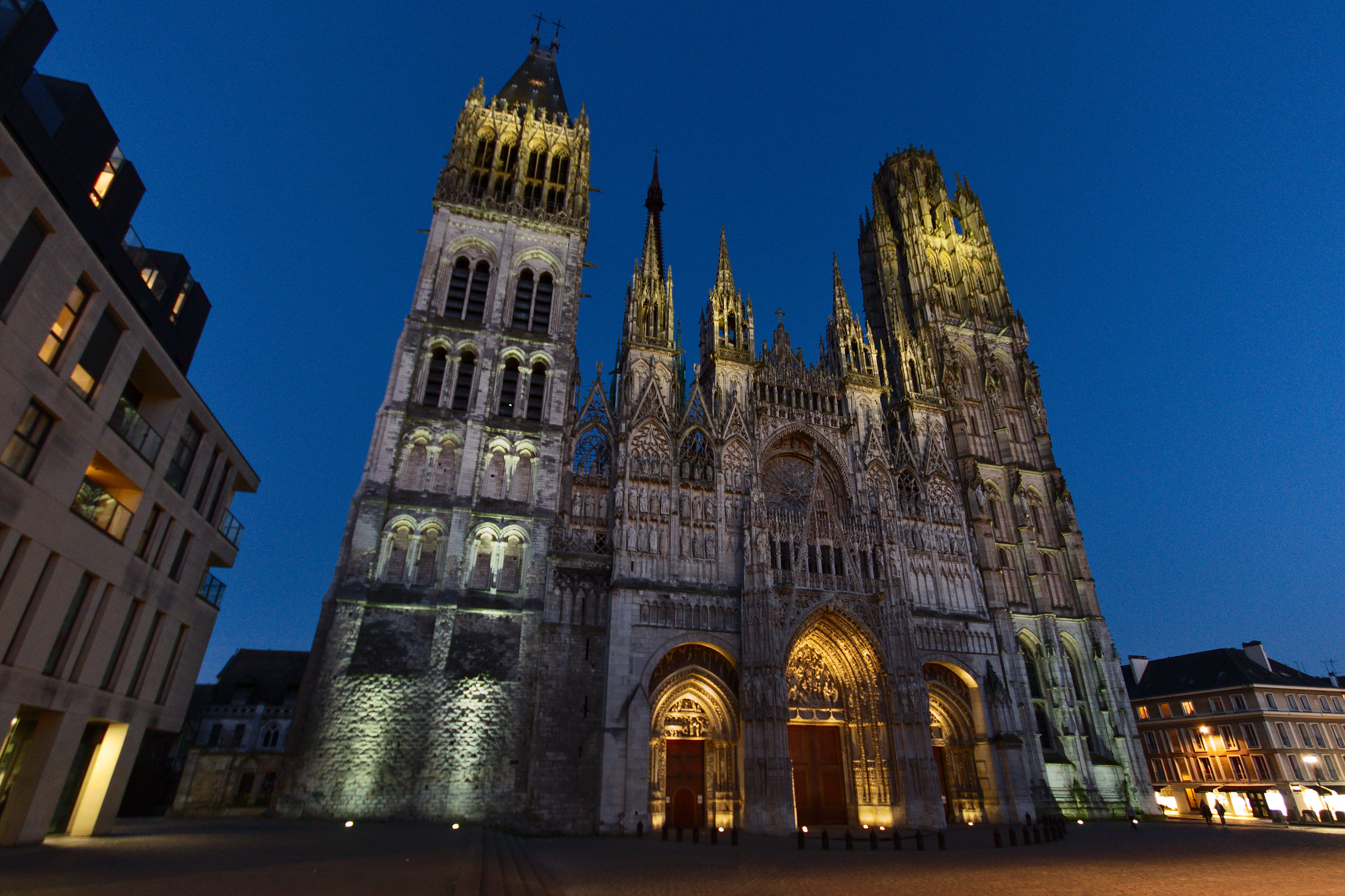
- Rouen Cathedral

- Coat of arms

- Coordinates: 48°53′N 0°10′E
- Country: France
- Regional council seat: Caen
- Prefecture: Rouen
- Departments: 5: Calvados (14); Eure (27); Manche (50); Orne (61); Seine-Maritime (76)

Government
  - President of the Regional Council: Hervé Morin (LC)

Area
  - Total: 29,906 km^{2} (11,547 sq mi)
  - Rank: 11th

Population (2023)
  - Total: 3,345,842
  - Density: 111.88/km^{2} (289.76/sq mi)
- Demonym: Norman

GDP
  - Total: €99.315 billion
  - Per capita: €29,900
- Time zone: UTC+01:00 (CET)
  - Summer (DST): UTC+02:00 (CEST)
- ISO 3166 code: FR-NOR
- NUTS Region: FRD
- Website: www.normandie.fr

Normandy (/ˈnɔːrməndi/ NOR-mən-dee; French: Normandie [nɔʁmɑ̃di]; Norman: Normaundie) is the northwesternmost of the eighteen regions of France, roughly coextensive with the historical Duchy of Normandy.

Normandy is divided into five administrative departments: Calvados, Eure, Manche, Orne and Seine-Maritime. It covers 29,906 square kilometres (11,547 sq mi), comprising roughly 5% of the territory of metropolitan France. Its population of 3,322,757 accounts for around 5% of the population of France. The inhabitants of Normandy are known as Normans, and the region is the historic homeland of the Norman language. The neighboring regions are Hauts-de-France and Ile-de-France to the east, Centre-Val de Loire to the southeast, Pays de la Loire to the south, and Brittany to the southwest. Its prefecture and largest city is Rouen, although the regional council sits in Caen, making Normandy one of two regions in France (along with Bourgogne-Franche-Comté) in which the prefect does not sit in the same city as the regional council.

Normandy's name comes from the settlement of the territory by Vikings ("Northmen") from the 9th century, and confirmed by treaty in the 10th century between King Charles III of France and the Viking jarl Rollo.

== History ==
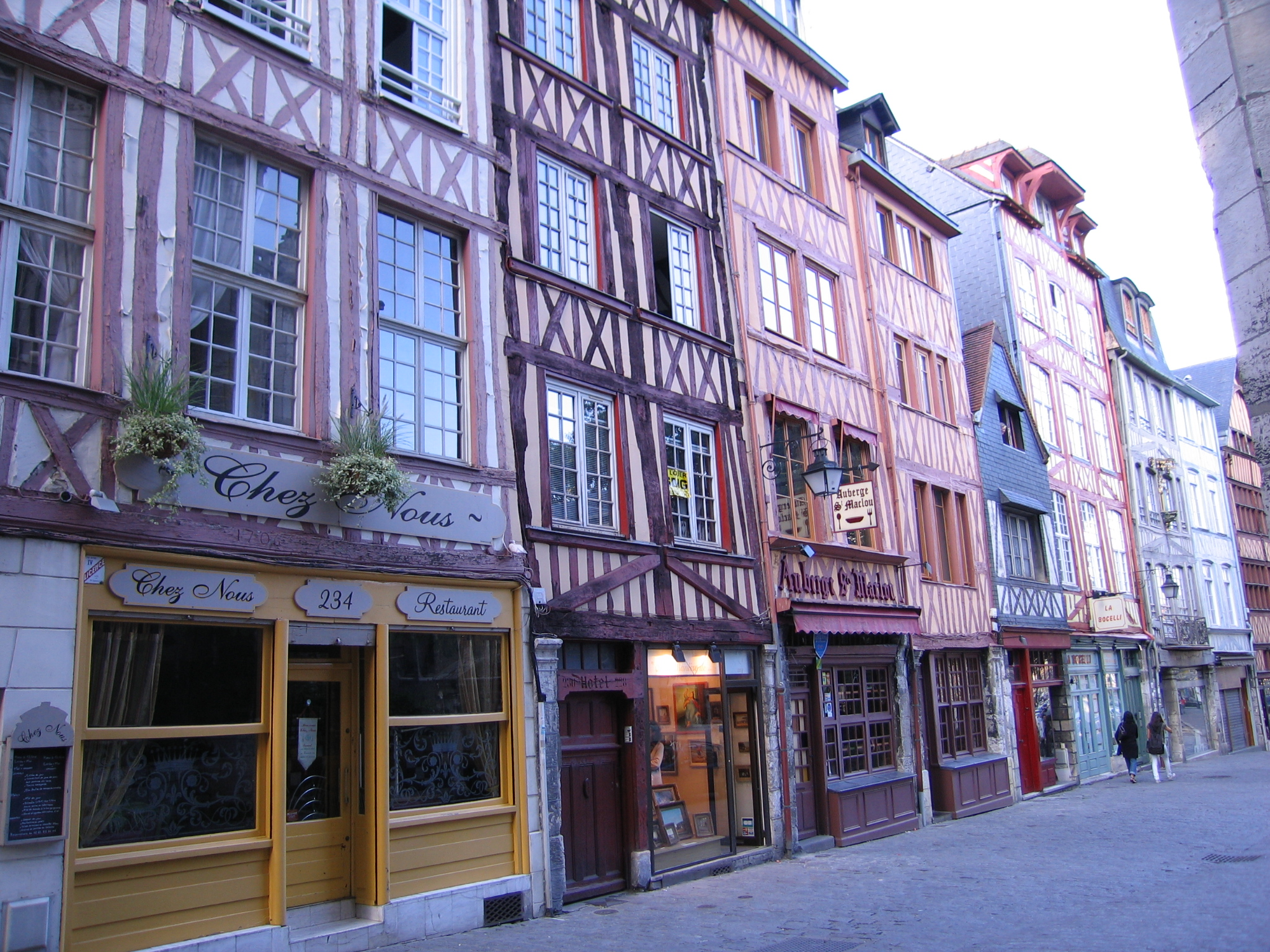
Half-timbered houses in Rouen

Rollo's descendant William became king of England in 1066 after defeating Harold Godwinson, the last of the Anglo-Saxon kings, at the Battle of Hastings, while retaining the fiefdom of Normandy for himself and his descendants.

In 1204, during the reign of John of England, mainland Normandy was taken from the Angevin Empire by France under King Philip II. Insular Normandy (the Channel Islands) remained, however, under English control. In 1259, Henry III of England recognized the legality of French possession of mainland Normandy under the Treaty of Paris.

In 1790 the five departments of Normandy replaced the former province.

Between 1956 and 2015 Normandy was divided into two administrative regions: Lower Normandy and Upper Normandy; the regions were merged into one single region on 1 January 2016. Upper Normandy (Haute-Normandie) consisted of the French departments of Seine-Maritime and Eure, and Lower Normandy (Basse-Normandie) of the departments of Orne, Calvados, and Manche.

== Politics ==
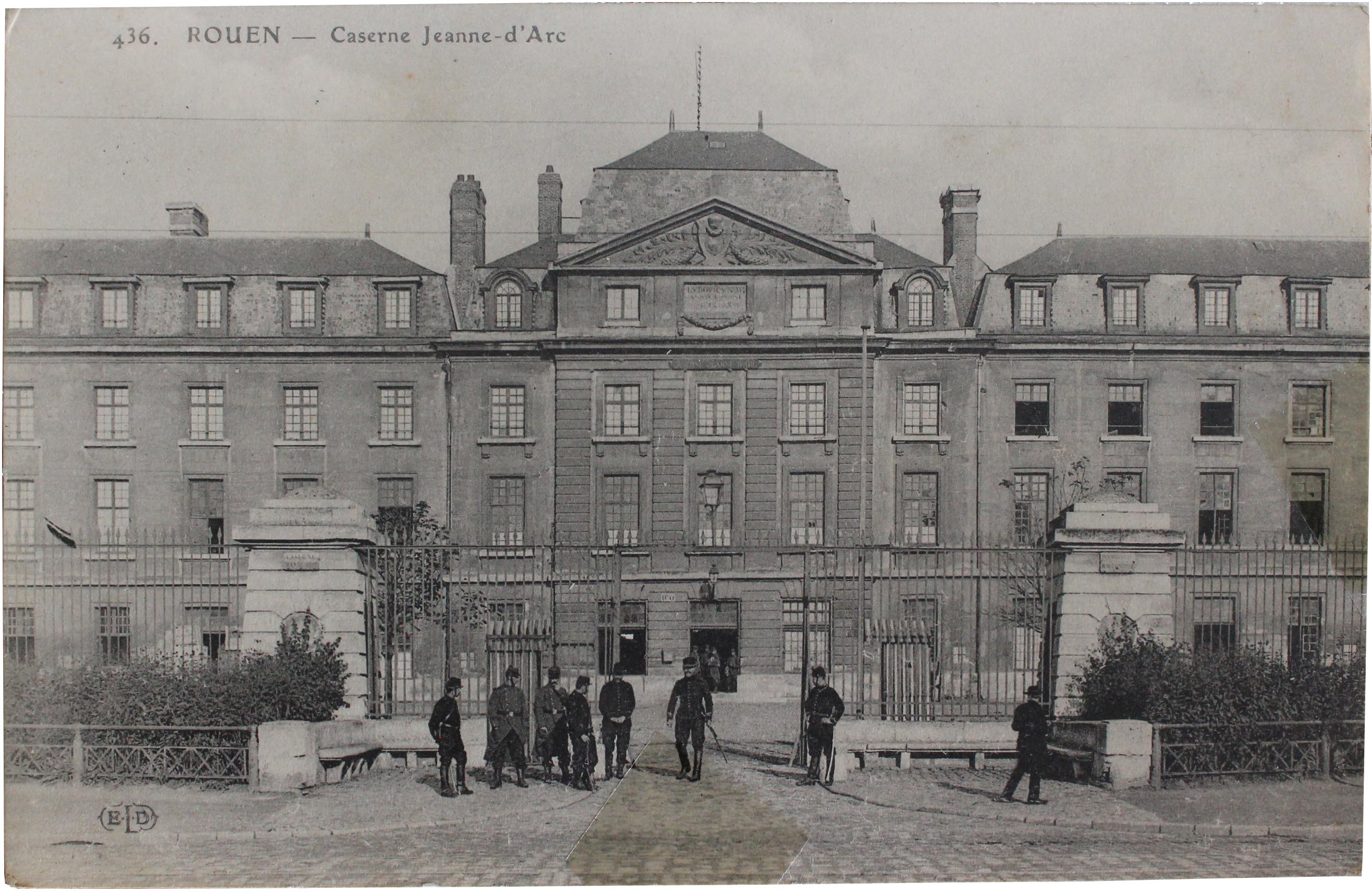
Historic photograph of the Caserne Jeanne d'Arc in Rouen, provisionally the seat of the Norman regional assembly

The modern region of Normandy was created by the territorial reform of French Regions in 2014 by the merger of Lower Normandy, and Upper Normandy. The new region took effect on 1 January 2016, after the regional elections in December 2015.

The Regional Council of Normandy, created on 1 January 2016, has 102 members who are elected under a system of proportional representation. The executive consists of a president and vice-presidents. Hervé Morin from the Centre party was elected president of the council in January 2016. The council is based in Caen, making Normandy one of only two regions (the other being Bourgogne-Franche-Comté) where the prefecture and seat of local government are located in different cities.

== Economy ==
Year	Area	Labour force in agriculture	Labour force in industry	Labour force in services
2003	Upper Normandy	2.30%	36.10%	61.60%
2006	Lower Normandy	6.50%	25.00%	68.50%
2006	France	2.20%	20.60%	77.20%

Area	GDP (in million of Euros) (2006)	Unemployment (% of the labour force) (2007)
Upper Normandy	46,853	6.80%
Lower Normandy	34,064	7.90%
France	1,791,956	7.50%

== Transport ==
There are only 2 operating airports in the region which are Caen–Carpiquet Airport and Deauville–Normandie Airport. Residents in the region normally use other major airports such as Rennes–Saint-Jacques Airport and Paris's Charles de Gaulle Airport which both can easily be reached by train, bus and car.

== Demographics ==
As of January 2006 the population of Normandy (including the part of Perche which lies inside the Orne département) is estimated at 3,260,000 with an average population density of 109 inhabitants per km^{2}, just under the French national average, but rising to 147 for Upper Normandy.

The main cities (population given from the 1999 census) are Rouen (518,316 in the metropolitan area), the capital since 2016 of the province and formerly of Upper Normandy; Caen (420,000 in the metropolitan area) and formerly the capital of Lower Normandy; Le Havre (296,773 in the metropolitan area); and Cherbourg (117,855 in the metropolitan area).
