= Timothée Houssin =

French politician (born 1988)

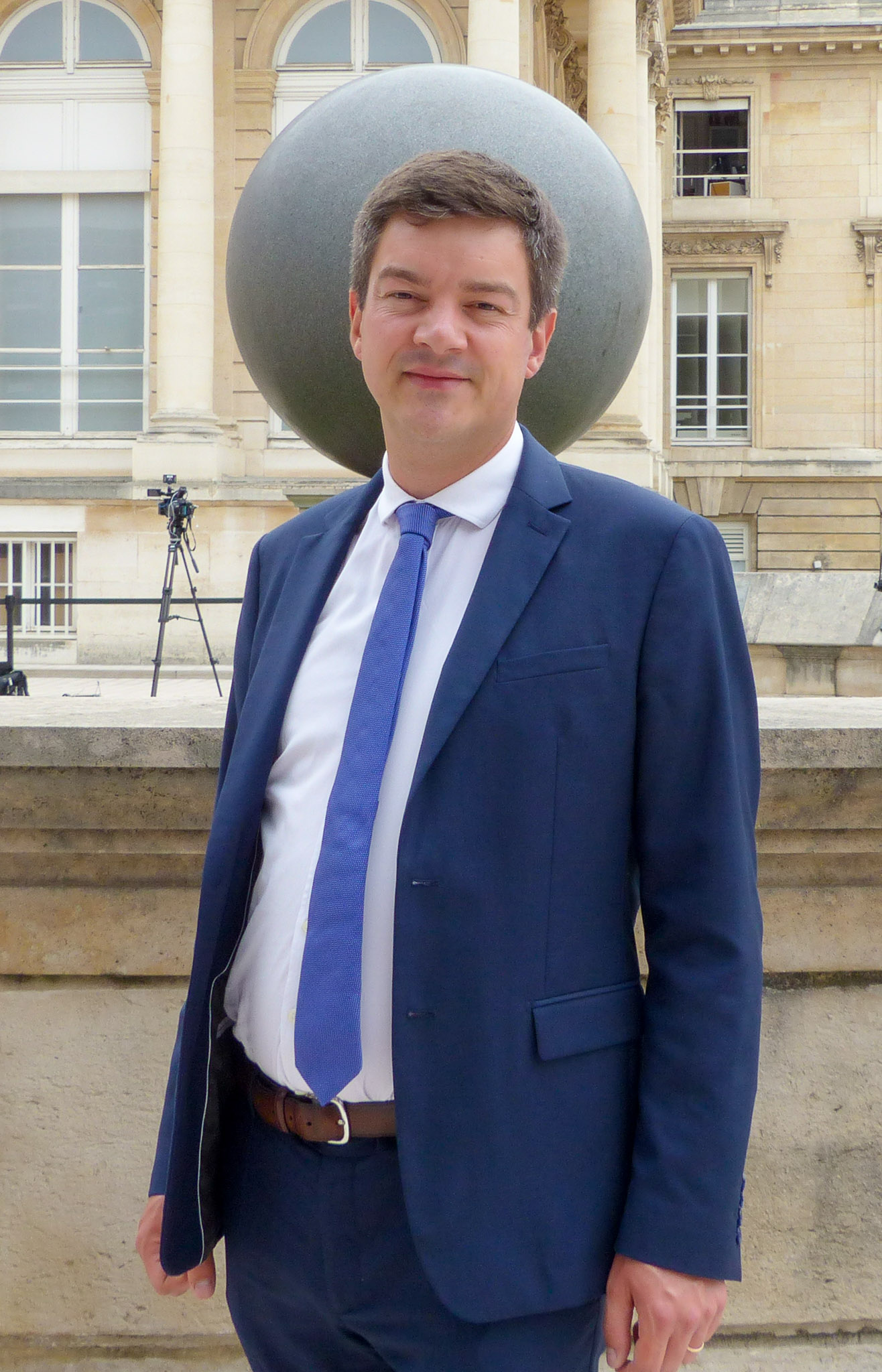

Member of the National Assembly for Eure's 5th constituency
- Incumbent
- Assumed office 22 June 2022
- Preceded by: Claire O'Petit

Member of the Regional Council of Normandy
- Incumbent
- Assumed office 4 January 2016
- President: Hervé Morin

Personal details
- Born: 29 July 1988 (age 37) Lille, France
- Political party: National Rally

Timothée Houssin (born 29 July 1988) is a French politician who has represented the 5th constituency of the Eure department in the National Assembly since 2022. A member of the National Rally (RN, formerly National Front, FN), he previously served as a municipal councillor of Barentin (elected in 2014) and Louviers (elected in 2020, resigned early 2022). Houssin was elected to the Regional Council of Normandy in 2015 and reelected in 2021.

In the second round of the 2022 legislative election, he defeated Vernon Mayor François Ouzilleau, who ran under the Ensemble coalition. Outgoing representative Claire O'Petit, who failed to receive the Ensemble nomination for a second term, had criticised the selection of Ouzilleau as a candidate.
