= François Ouzilleau =

French politician (born 1984)

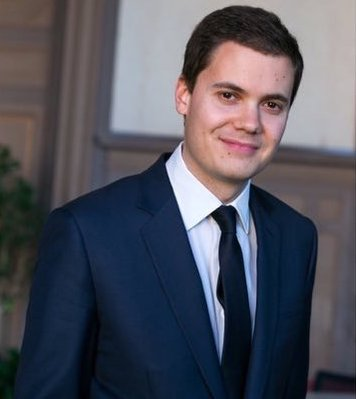
- Ouzilleau in 2015

Mayor of Vernon
- Incumbent
- Assumed office 4 December 2015
- Preceded by: Sébastien Lecornu

Personal details
- Born: 18 September 1984 (age 41) Charleville-Mézières, France
- Party: Miscellaneous right
- Other political affiliations: La République En Marche!

François Ouzilleau (French pronunciation: [fʁɑ̃swa uzijo]; born 18 September 1984) is a French politician who has served as mayor of Vernon since 2015. He has also served as a vice president of Seine Normandie Agglomération since 2020. He has been a member of the Regional Council of Normandy since 2016.

In the 2022 legislative election, Ouzilleau was a candidate for the National Assembly in Eure's 5th constituency under the banner of La République En Marche! (LREM), but was defeated in the second round by Timothée Houssin of the National Rally (RN), with 49.3% of the vote.
