= Jean-Pierre Nicolas (politician) =

French politician

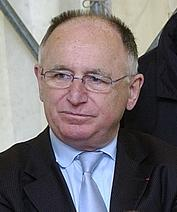

Mayor of Évreux
- In office 12 March 2007 – 16 March 2008
- Preceded by: Jean-Louis Debré
- Succeeded by: Michel Champredon

Member of the National Assembly for Eure's 2nd constituency
- In office 2002–2012
- Preceded by: Alfred Recours
- Succeeded by: Jean-Louis Destans

Personal details
- Born: 21 October 1938 (age 87) Moulins, France
- Party: UMP

Jean-Pierre Nicolas (born 21 October 1938) is a French politician. He represented Eure's 2nd constituency in the National Assembly of France from 2002 to 2012, and is a member of the Union for a Popular Movement
