= Arrondissements of the Eure department =

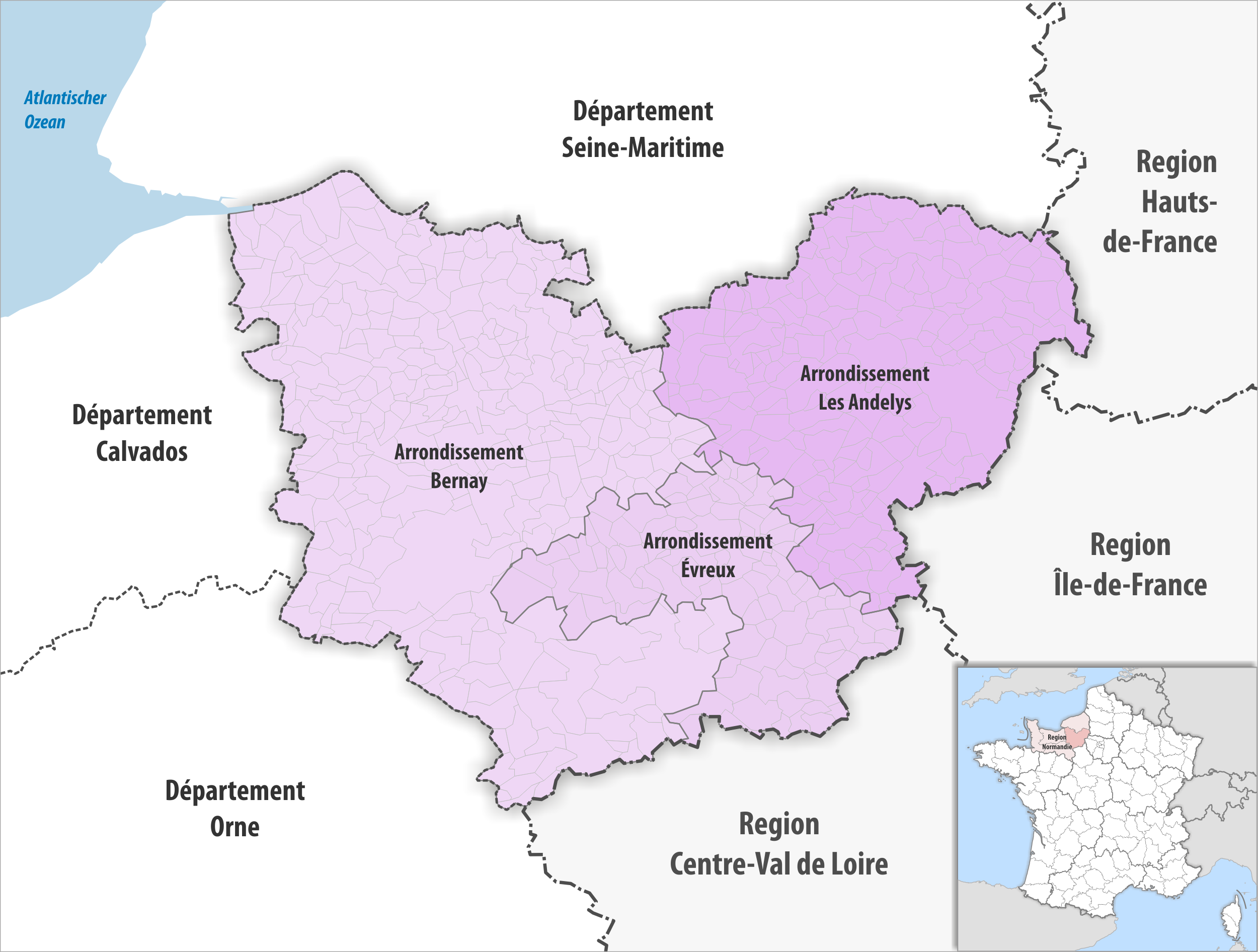
Map of arrondissements of the Eure department.

The 3 arrondissements of the Eure department are:

1. Arrondissement of Les Andelys, (subprefecture: Les Andelys) with 185 communes. The population of the arrondissement was 235,024 in 2021.
2. Arrondissement of Bernay, (subprefecture: Bernay) with 297 communes. The population of the arrondissement was 225,284 in 2021.
3. Arrondissement of Évreux, (prefecture of the Eure department: Évreux) with 103 communes. The population of the arrondissement was 138,626 in 2021.

== History ==
In 1800 the arrondissements of Évreux, Les Andelys, Bernay, Louviers and Pont-Audemer were established. The arrondissements of Louviers and Pont-Audemer were disbanded in 1926. On 1 January 2006, the arrondissement of Évreux lost the two cantons of Louviers-Nord and Louviers-Sud to the arrondissement of Les Andelys, and the canton of Amfreville-la-Campagne to the arrondissement of Bernay.

The borders of the arrondissements of Eure were modified in January 2017:

- one commune from the arrondissement of Les Andelys to the arrondissement of Bernay
- one commune from the arrondissement of Bernay to the arrondissement of Évreux
- 35 communes from the arrondissement of Évreux to the arrondissement of Les Andelys
- 77 communes from the arrondissement of Évreux to the arrondissement of Bernay
