= Departmental Council of Eure =

Departmental legislature in France

Departmental Council of Eure Conseil départemental de l'Eure

Leadership
- President: Alexandre Rassaërt, DVD since 16 December 2022

Structure
- Seats: 46
- Political groups: Government (39): DVD (16); LR (13); RE (4); UDI (3); DVG (2); MoDem (1); Opposition (7): PS (3); DVG (2); LÉ (1); PCF (1); eureennormandie.fr

The Departmental Council of Eure (French: Conseil Départemental de l'Eure) is the deliberative assembly of the Eure department in the region of Normandy. It consists of 46 members (general councilors) from 23 cantons and its headquarters are in Évreux.

The President of the General Council is Alexandre Rassaërt.

== See also ==
- Eure
- General councils of France
