= Katiana Levavasseur =

French politician

Member of the National Assembly for Eure's 2nd constituency
- Incumbent
- Assumed office 22 June 2022
- Preceded by: Fabien Gouttefarde

Municipal councillor of Le Neubourg
- Incumbent
- Assumed office 15 March 2020
- Mayor: Isabelle Vauquelin

Personal details
- Born: 9 December 1970 (age 55) Rouen, France
- Party: National Rally
- Occupation: Cleaner

Katiana Levavasseur, Member of the second constituency of the Eure

Katiana Levavasseur (born 9 December 1970) is a French politician of the National Rally and is a Member of the National Assembly for Eure's 2nd constituency. She was elected during the 2022 French legislative election and defeated outgoing deputy Fabien Gouttefarde.

Levavasseur worked as a cleaner and a maintenance technician at an E.Leclerc supermarket. During her campaign, she stated that she wanted to defend "the employment of France's unskilled workers." A profile by France 24 noted that Levavasseur's election (along with other newly elected deputies such as Rachel Keke) indicated a growing trend of elected politicians from lower economic backgrounds taking up office.

She is a municipal councilor of Neubourg.
