= Franck Gilard =

French politician

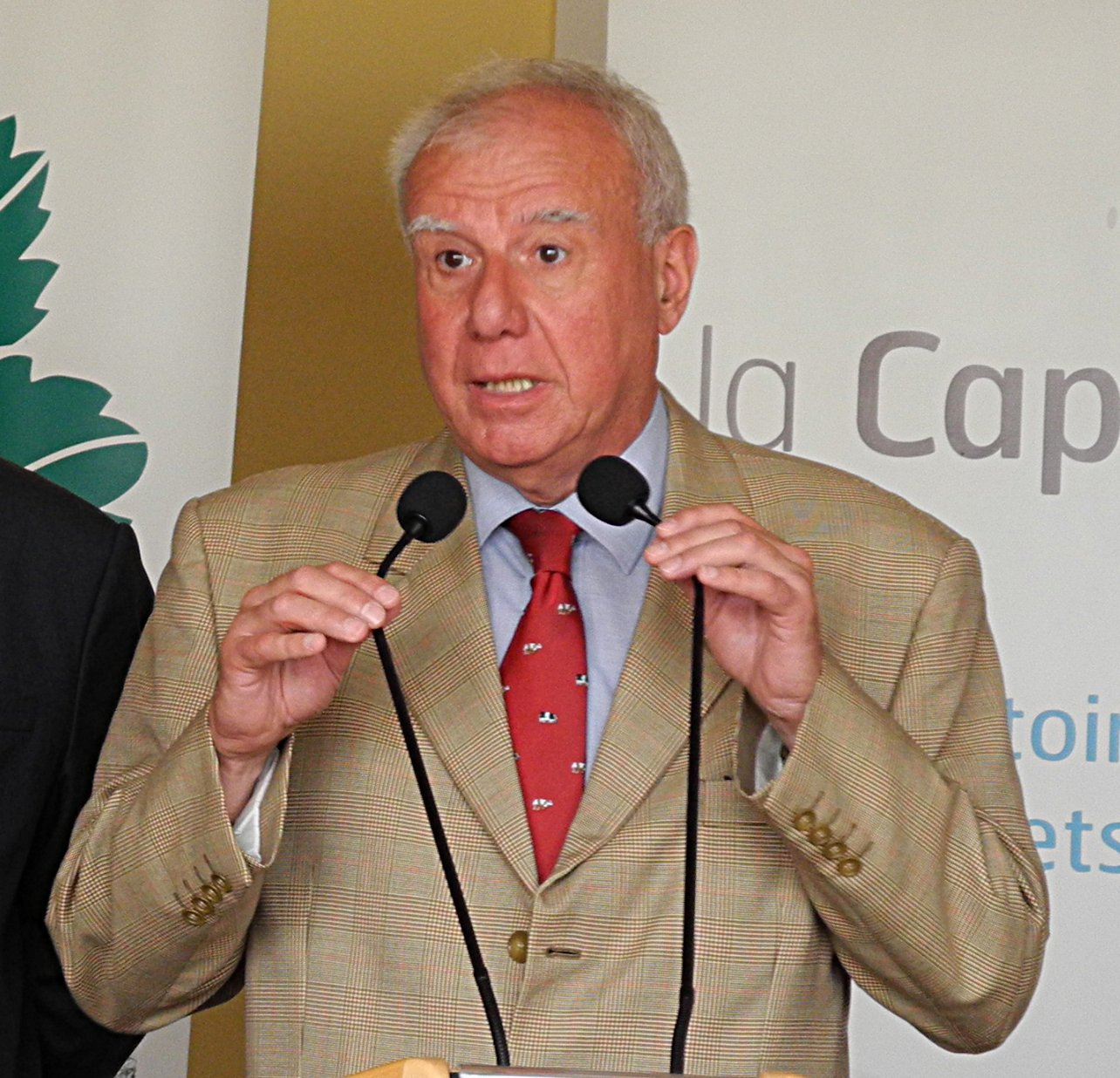
- Franck Gilard in 2011

Member of the National Assembly for Eure's 5th constituency
- In office 20 June 2002 – 20 June 2017
- Preceded by: Catherine Picard
- Succeeded by: Claire O'Petit

Personal details
- Born: 1 November 1950 (age 75) Riaillé, Loire-Atlantique, France
- Party: The Republicans

Franck Gilard (born November 1, 1950, in Riaillé, Loire-Atlantique) was a member of the National Assembly of France from 2002 to 2017, representing the 5th constituency of the Eure department, as a member of the Union for a Popular Movement.

He also belonged to the Club de l'horloge.

== Biography ==
Franck Gilard holds a master's degree in law and is a graduate of the Sciences Po. He was “trained in the meetings of the Club de l'Horloge”.

A former colleague of René Tomasini and Alain Pluchet, Franck Gilard was elected deputy on June 16, 2002, in the Eure's 5th constituency. He was re-elected on June 17, 2007, and June 17, 2012. He did not run for re-election in 2017.

In the National Assembly, Franck Gilard is a member of the Republican Right group, and sits on the Economic Affairs Committee and the Special Committee responsible for auditing and verifying accounts.
