= Eure's 2nd constituency =

Constituency of the National Assembly of France

2nd constituency of Eure
- inline Constituency of the National Assembly of France

- Location of Eure in France

- Constituency in department
- Deputy: Katiana Levavasseur; RN
- Department: Eure

The 2nd constituency of Eure is a French legislative constituency in the Eure département. It contains the cantons of Brionne, Conches-en-Ouche, Le Neubourg and the cantons of Évreux (1, 2 and 3).

== Deputies ==
Election	Member	Party
1958	Jean Lainé	CNIP
1962	Jean Lainé	CNIP
1967	Jean Lainé	RI
1968	Jean Lainé	RI
1973	Claude Michel	PS
1978	Claude Michel	PS
1981	Claude Michel	PS
1986	Proportional representation - no election by constituency	
1988	Alfred Recours	PS
1993	Catherine Nicolas	RPR
1997	Alfred Recours	PS
2002	Jean-Pierre Nicolas	UMP
2007	Jean-Pierre Nicolas	UMP
2012	Jean-Louis Destans	PS
2017	Fabien Gouttefarde	LREM
2022	Katiana Levavasseur	RN
2024	Katiana Levavasseur	RN

== Election results ==
=== 2024 ===
Candidate	Party	Alliance	First round			Second round		
Candidate	Party	Alliance	Votes	%	+/–	Votes	%	+/–
Katiana Levavasseur	RN		22,952	43.61	+14.00	26,898	54.36	+3.26
Timour Veyri	PS	NFP	11,185	21.25	+0.23	22,579	45.64	new
Isabelle Collin	HOR	Ensemble	9,225	17.53	-8.18			
Stéphanie Auger	DVD		6,202	11.78	new			
Edouard Baude	HOR	diss.	1,658	3.15	new			
Mélanie Peyraud	LO		614	1.17	+0.10			
Laurence Brély	REC		558	1.06	-2.53			
Laure Anne Godard	DVC		242	0.46	new			
Votes			52,636	100.00		49,477	100.00	
Valid votes			52,636	97.35	-0.33	49,477	91.92	+0.39
Blank votes			1,095	2.03	+0.22	3,458	6.42	-0.16
Null votes			338	0.63	+0.12	890	1.65	-0.24
Turnout			54,069	68.34	+18.00	53,825	68.03	+19.38
Abstentions			25,043	31.66	-18.00	25,300	31.97	-19.38
Registered voters			79,112			79,125		
Result			RN HOLD					

Edouard Baude ran as a HOR dissident, without the endorsement of Ensemble.

=== 2022 ===
Legislative Election 2022: Eure's 2nd constituency
Party	Candidate	Votes	%	±%
RN	Katiana Levavasseur	11,508	29.61	+10.07
LREM (Ensemble)	Fabien Gouttefarde	9,994	25.71	-9.21
LFI (NUPÉS)	Nathalie Samson	8,171	21.02	+3.32
LR (UDC)	Francine Maragliano	3,945	10.15	−3.43
REC	Emmanuel Camoin	1,394	3.59	N/A
DVE	Martine Fougues	1,295	3.33	N/A
Others	N/A	2,562	6.59	
Turnout		38,869	50.34	−0.24
2nd round result
RN	Katiana Levavasseur	17,990	51.10	+14.35
LREM (Ensemble)	Fabien Gouttefarde	17,214	48.90	−14.35
Turnout		35,204	48.65	+3.79
RN gain from LREM				

=== 2017 ===
Candidate	Label	First round		Second round	
Candidate	Label	Votes	%	Votes	%
Fabien Gouttefarde	REM	13,516	34.92	20,056	63.25
Emmanuel Camoin	FN	7,563	19.54	11,653	36.75
Jean-Paul Legendre	LR	5,256	13.58		
Nathalie Pacouret	FI	4,125	10.66		
Valéry Beuriot	PCF	2,725	7.04		
Jean-Pierre Nicolas	DVD	2,160	5.58		
Juliette Poulet	DIV	1,215	3.14		
Michel Champredon	DVG	1,121	2.90		
Mélanie Peyraud	EXG	402	1.04		
Pierre Dollié	DVD	355	0.92		
Nadège Alexandre	DIV	272	0.70		
Votes		38,710	100.00	31,709	100.00
Valid votes		38,710	97.53	31,709	90.07
Blank votes		738	1.86	2,745	7.80
Null votes		244	0.61	749	2.13
Turnout		39,692	50.58	35,203	44.86
Abstentions		38,775	49.42	43,268	55.14
Registered voters		78,467		78,471	
Source: Ministry of the Interior Election Results

=== 2012 ===
2012 legislative election in Eure's 2nd constituency
Candidate	Party	First round		Second round	
Candidate	Party	Votes	%	Votes	%
Jean-Louis Destans	PS	15,983	35.62%	21,860	50.04%
Jean-Pierre Nicolas	UMP	15,671	34.93%	21,821	49.96%
Emmanuel Camoin	FN	7,024	15.66%		
Valéry Beuriot	FG	2,488	5.55%		
Emmanuel Roussel	MoDem	1,159	2.58%		
Ludovic Lesage	EELV	1,016	2.26%		
Nadia Bousckri	??	465	1.04%		
Eric Marre	NPA	288	0.64%		
Mi-Heai Yun	DLR	267	0.60%		
Sébastien Pasadovic	POI	188	0.42%		
Rosine Lewi	LO	163	0.36%		
Jean Lucat		153	0.34%		
Valid votes		44,865	98.48%	43,681	96.61%
Spoilt and null votes		693	1.52%	1,535	3.39%
Votes cast / turnout		45,558	59.16%	45,216	58.74%
Abstentions		31,446	40.84%	31,761	41.26%
Registered voters		77,004	100.00%	76,977	100.00%
