= Eure's 5th constituency =

Constituency of the National Assembly of France

5th constituency of Eure
- inline Constituency of the National Assembly of France

- Constituency in department

- Location of Eure in France
- Deputy: Timothée Houssin; RN
- Department: Eure

The 5th constituency of Eure is a French legislative constituency in the Eure département. It consists of the cantons of Andelys and Gisors.

== Deputies ==
| Election | Member | Party |
|---|---|---|
| 1988 | Freddy Deschaux-Beaume | PS |
| 1993 | Jean-Claude Asphe | RPR |
| 1997 | Catherine Picard | PRG |
| 2002 | Franck Gilard | UMP |
| 2007 | Franck Gilard | UMP |
| 2012 | Franck Gilard | UMP |
| 2017 | Claire O'Petit | LREM |
| 2022 | Timothée Houssin | RN |
| 2024 | Timothée Houssin | RN |

== Election results ==
=== 2024 ===
| Candidate | Party | Alliance | First round | | | Second round | | |
| Candidate | Party | Alliance | Votes | % | +/– | Votes | % | +/– |
|---|---|---|---|---|---|---|---|---|
| Timothée Houssin | RN | | 26,603 | 45.25 | +16.02 | 29,338 | 51.14 | +0.51 |
| Frédéric Duché | HOR | Ensemble | 14,333 | 24.39 | -3.34 | 28,033 | 48.86 | -0.51 |
| Pierre-Yves Jourdain | LE | NFP | 12,506 | 21.28 | +0.42 | withdrew | | |
| David Daverton | LR | UDC | 3,233 | 5.50 | -2.64 | | | |
| Christian Mazure | DIV | | 911 | 1.55 | new | | | |
| Delphine Blitman | LO | | 671 | 1.14 | -0.10 | | | |
| Ludovic Beaujouan | DIV | | 517 | 0.88 | new | | | |
| Colin Prévoteau du Clary | DSV | | 2 | 0.00 | -1.57 | | | |
| Votes | | | 58,776 | 100.00 | | 57,371 | 100.00 | |
| Valid votes | | | 58,776 | 97.65 | -0.34 | 57,371 | 95.39 | +3.52 |
| Blank votes | | | 1,060 | 1.76 | +0.22 | 2,145 | 3.57 | -2.96 |
| Null votes | | | 357 | 0.59 | +0.11 | 625 | 1.04 | -0.55 |
| Turnout | | | 60,193 | 67.02 | +18.07 | 60,141 | 66.95 | +19.78 |
| Abstentions | | | 29,617 | 32.98 | -18.07 | 29,685 | 33.05 | -19.78 |
| Registered voters | | | 89,810 | | | 89,826 | | |
| Result | | | RN HOLD | | | | | |

=== 2022 ===
Legislative Election 2022: Eure's 5th constituency
| Party | Candidate | Votes | % | ±% |
|---|---|---|---|---|
| RN | Timothée Houssin | 12,556 | 29.23 | +7.66 |
| LREM (Ensemble) | François Ouzilleau | 11,912 | 27.73 | -0.83 |
| EELV (NUPÉS) | Pierre-Yves Jourdain | 8,959 | 20.86 | −1.09 |
| LR (UDC) | David Daverton | 3,497 | 8.14 | −11.64 |
| REC | François Bonnet | 2,292 | 5.34 | N/A |
| DVE | Joëlle Fontaine | 1,389 | 3.23 | N/A |
| Others | N/A | 2,352 | 5.48 | |
| Turnout | | 42,957 | 48.95 | +0.47 |
2nd round result
| RN | Timothée Houssin | 19,654 | 50.63 | +6.61 |
| LREM (Ensemble) | François Ouzilleau | 19,164 | 49.37 | −6.61 |
| Turnout | | 38,818 | 47.17 | +4.44 |
| RN gain from LREM | | | | |

=== 2017 ===
| Candidate | Label | First round | | Second round | |
| Candidate | Label | Votes | % | Votes | % |
|---|---|---|---|---|---|
| Claire O'Petit | REM | 11,965 | 28.56 | 18,804 | 55.98 |
| Vincent Taillieu | FN | 9,039 | 21.57 | 14,784 | 44.02 |
| Alexandre Rassaërt | LR | 8,289 | 19.78 | | |
| Pierre Zimmermann | FI | 4,414 | 10.53 | | |
| Martine Seguela | PS | 3,197 | 7.63 | | |
| Joëlle Fontaine | ECO | 882 | 2.10 | | |
| Michael Barton | DLF | 853 | 2.04 | | |
| Liliane Bernini | PCF | 709 | 1.69 | | |
| Joëlle Graebling | DIV | 511 | 1.22 | | |
| Carl Lang | EXD | 455 | 1.09 | | |
| Karine Ventura | DIV | 417 | 1.00 | | |
| Anne-Marie Colin | EXG | 404 | 0.96 | | |
| Patrick Delattre | DIV | 321 | 0.77 | | |
| Amor Louhichi | DVD | 294 | 0.70 | | |
| Dominique Dos Santos | DVD | 151 | 0.36 | | |
| Votes | | 41,901 | 100.00 | 33,588 | 100.00 |
| Valid votes | | 41,901 | 97.68 | 33,588 | 88.83 |
| Blank votes | | 769 | 1.79 | 3,131 | 8.28 |
| Null votes | | 227 | 0.53 | 1,092 | 2.89 |
| Turnout | | 42,897 | 48.48 | 37,811 | 42.73 |
| Abstentions | | 45,583 | 51.52 | 50,673 | 57.27 |
| Registered voters | | 88,480 | | 88,484 | |
Source: Ministry of the Interior

=== 2012 ===
2012 legislative election in Eure's 5th constituency
| Candidate | Party | First round | | Second round | |
| Candidate | Party | Votes | % | Votes | % |
|---|---|---|---|---|---|
| Franck Gilard | UMP | 16,429 | 32.92% | 22,294 | 60.41% |
| Jean-Michel Dubois | FN | 9,985 | 20.01% | 14,608 | 39.58% |
| Jérôme Bourlet De La Vallee | EELV–PS | 6,439 | 12.90% | | |
| Hélène Segura | PS dissident | 5,884 | 11.79% | | |
| Anne Mansouret | PS dissident | 4,618 | 9.25% | | |
| Jean-Luc Lecomte | FG | 3,289 | 6.59% | | |
| Joëlle Fontaine | ?? | 858 | 1.72% | | |
| Claire O'Petit | MoDem | 814 | 1.63% | | |
| François Leve | DLR | 547 | 1.10% | | |
| Carl Lang | UDN | 544 | 1.09% | | |
| Alain Luguet | LO | 247 | 0.49% | | |
| Viviane Horvais | NPA | 245 | 0.49% | | |
| Valid votes | | 49,899 | 98.40% | 36,903 | 84.60% |
| Spoilt and null votes | | 811 | 1.60% | 6,720 | 15.41% |
| Votes cast / turnout | | 50,710 | 58.13% | 43,622 | 50.01% |
| Abstentions | | 36,526 | 41.87% | 43,609 | 49.99% |
| Registered voters | | 87,236 | 100.00% | 87,231 | 100.00% |
