= Claude Michel (politician) =

French politician

Claude Michel (born 26 September 1938) is a French politician.

Michel was born in Elne. He served on the National Assembly from 1973 to 1988, representing Eure's 2nd constituency until 1986, then was elected to his final term via the Socialist Party list.
