= Alexandre Rassaërt =

French politician (born 1987)

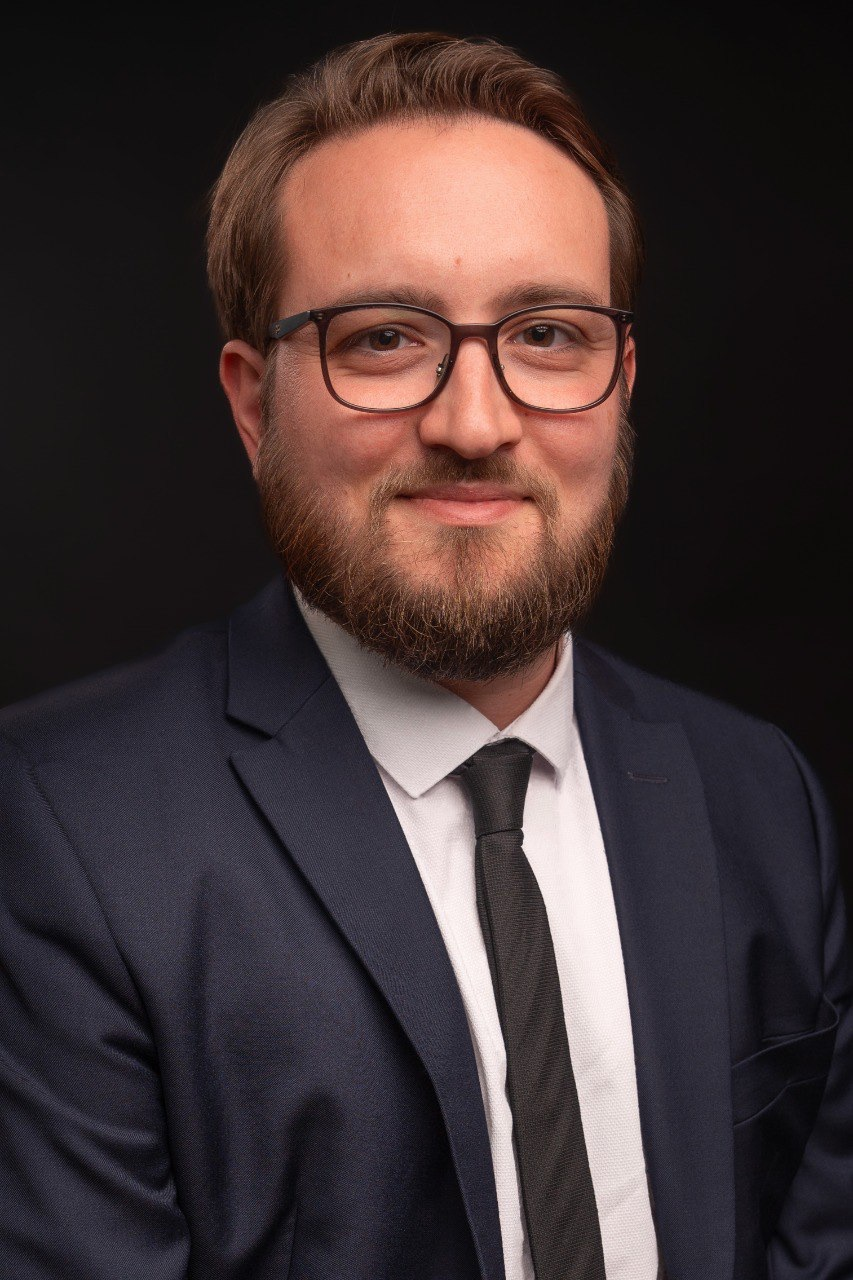
- Rassaërt in 2023

President of the Departmental Council of Eure
- Incumbent
- Assumed office 16 December 2022
- Preceded by: Sébastien Lecornu

Personal details
- Born: 17 September 1987 (age 38)
- Party: Independent (since 2022)
- Other political affiliations: The Republicans (until 2022)

Alexandre Rassaërt (born 17 September 1987) is a French politician serving as president of the departmental council of Eure since 2022. From 2014 to 2022, he served as mayor of Gisors. In the 2017 legislative election, he was a candidate for Eure's 5th constituency.
