= Regional Council of Normandy =

- Logo of the Council

Type
- Type: Regional council

Leadership
- President: Hervé Morin, LC since 4 January 2016

Structure
- Seats: 102
- Political groups: Government (60): The Republicans - The Centrists (60) (Note: LR (28); Miscellaneous Right (18); LC (7); MoDem (3); UDI (2); LMR (1); PR (1)); Opposition (42): National Rally (12) (Note: RN (11); LAF (1)); The Ecologists (11); Socialist Party (9); Renaissance (7) (Note: Miscellaneous Right (3); RE (2); Miscellaneous Centre (1); DP (1)); Reconquête (3)

Elections
- Voting system: Two-round list proportional representation system with majority bonus
- Last election: 20 and 27 June 2021
- Next election: 2028 French regional elections

Meeting place
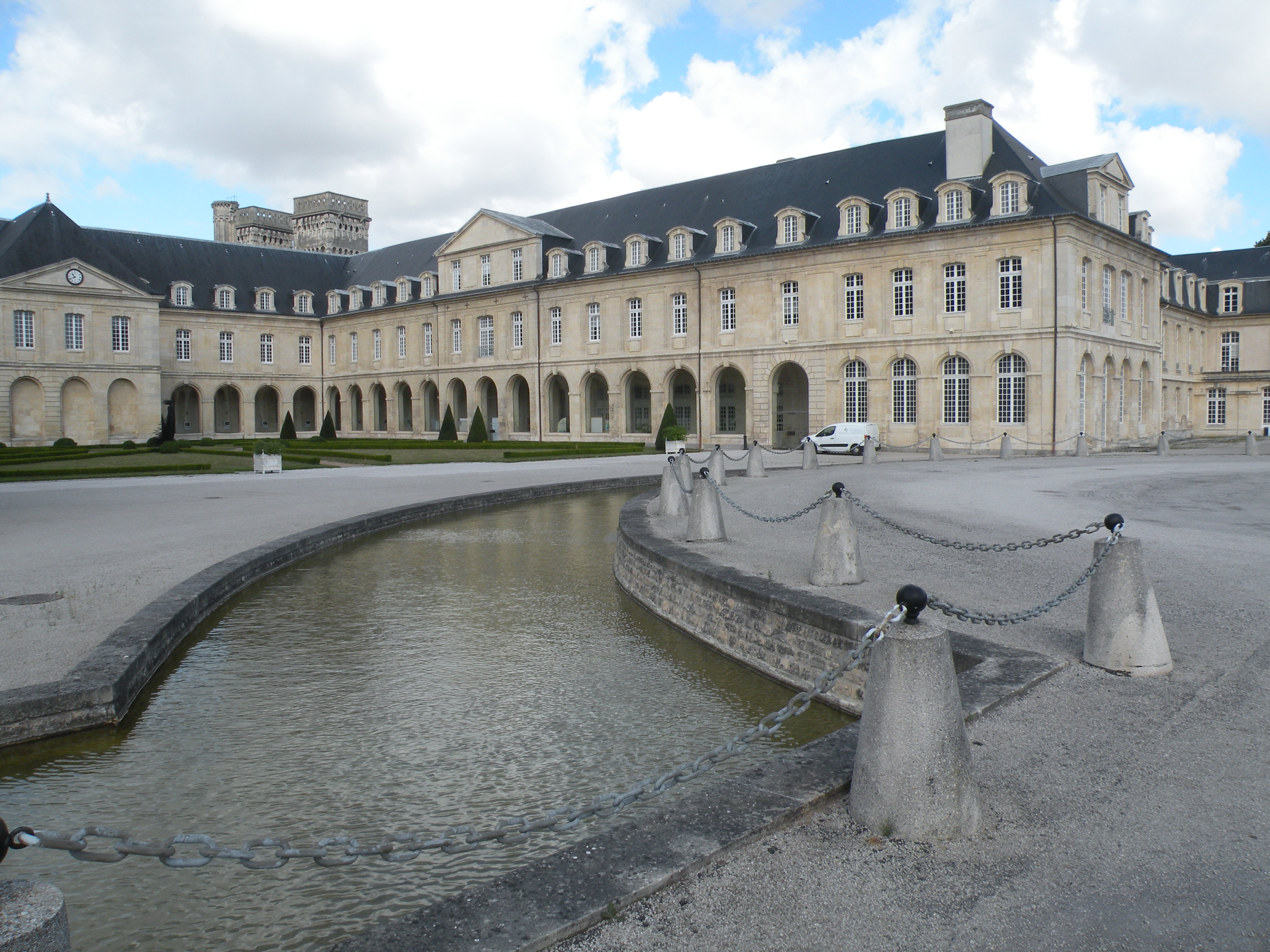
- Abbey of Sainte-Trinité

The Regional Council of Normandy (French: Conseil Régional de Normandie) is the executive body for the French Region of Normandy since its creation on January 1, 2016.

Hervé Morin has served as the president of the Regional Council since January 4, 2016. The Regional Council has its offices in Caen at the former Abbey of Sainte-Trinité, where the now-defunct Regional Council of Lower Normandy was located until 2016, and in Rouen.

== See also ==
- Category:Members of the Regional Council of Normandy
