= Eure =

Department of France

- Department of France
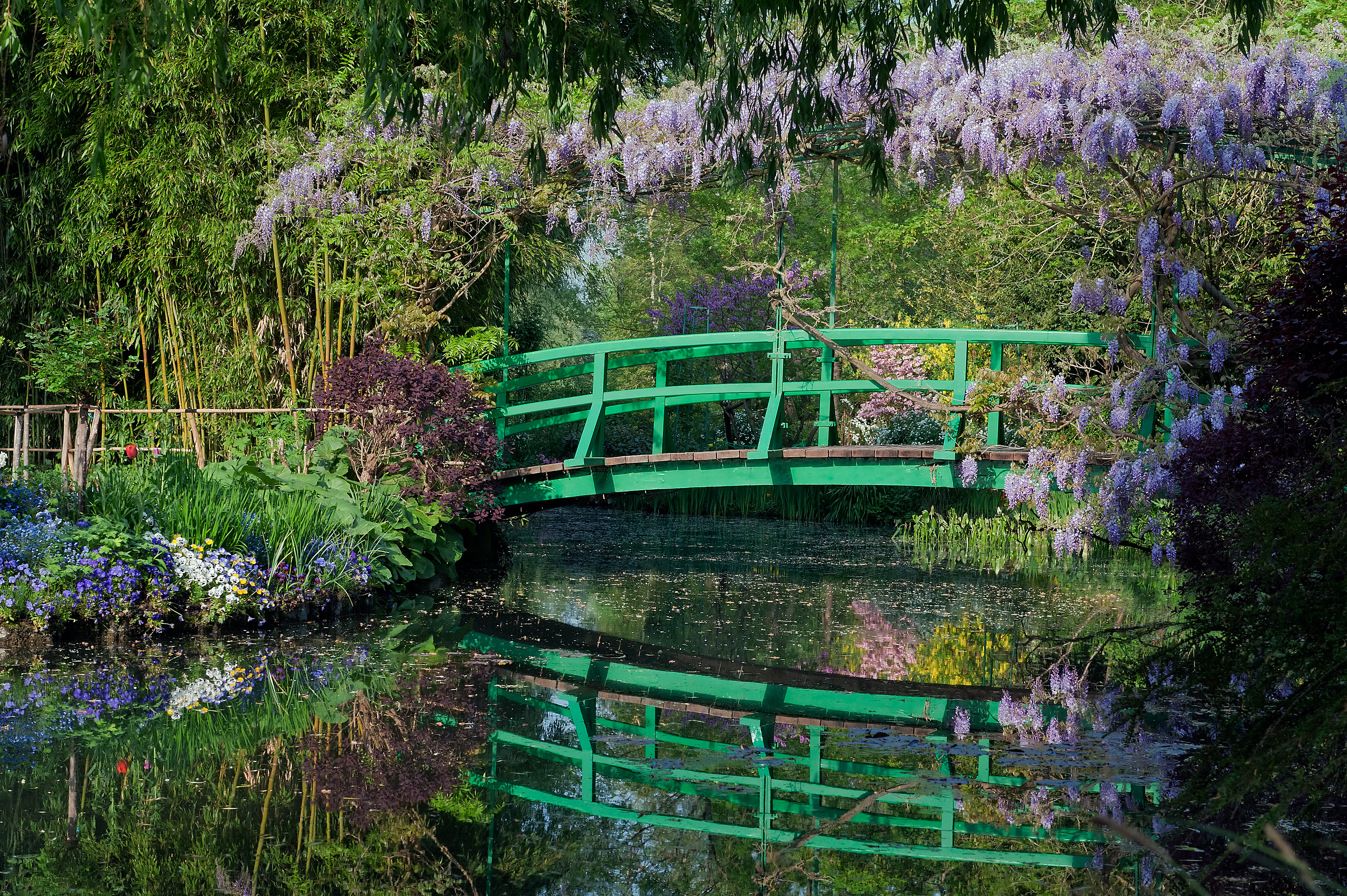
- Claude Monet's garden and water-lily pond in Giverny, near Yvelines, subject of a series of famous paintings

- Flag Coat of arms

- Location of Eure in France
- Coordinates: 49°5′N 1°0′E
- Country: France
- Region: Normandy
- Prefecture: Évreux
- Subprefectures: Les Andelys; Bernay

Government
  - President of the Departmental Council: Alexandre Rassaërt (DVD)

Area^{1}
  - Total: 6,040 km^{2} (2,330 sq mi)

Population (2023)
  - Total: 602,714
  - Rank: 43rd
  - Density: 99.8/km^{2} (258/sq mi)
- Time zone: UTC+1 (CET)
  - Summer (DST): UTC+2 (CEST)
- ISO 3166 code: FR-27
- Department number: 27
- Arrondissements: 3
- Cantons: 23
- Communes: 585
- ^1 French Land Register data, which exclude estuaries and lakes, ponds and glaciers larger than 1 km^{2}

Eure (/ɜːr/ UR; French pronunciation: [œʁ]; Norman: Eure or Eûre) is a department in the administrative region of Normandy, northwestern France, named after the river Eure. Its prefecture is Évreux. In 2023, Eure had a population of 602,714.

== History ==
Eure is one of the original 83 departments created during the French Revolution on 4 March 1790. It was created from part of the former province of Normandy. The name in fact is taken from the Eure river flowing mainly in this department.

Eure in 1790

After the allied victory at Waterloo, Eure was occupied by Prussian troops between June 1815 and November 1818.

In the wake of Louis-Napoléon's December coup of 1851, Eure was one of the departments placed under a state of emergency in order to avert resistance to the post-republican régime. In the event fewer than 100 government opponents in Eure were arrested.

== Geography ==
Eure is part of the current region of Normandy and is surrounded by the departments of Seine-Maritime, Oise, Val-d'Oise, Yvelines, Eure-et-Loir, Orne, and Calvados. It also has a short coastline within the Atlantic Ocean across the Seine estuary. It is the only Normand department to border the region of Île-de-France.

The department is a largely wooded plateau intersected by the valleys of the river Seine and its tributaries. The altitude varies from sea level in the north to 248 metres (814 feet) above it in the south.

=== Principal towns ===
The most populous commune is Évreux, the prefecture. As of 2023, there are 6 communes with more than 10,000 inhabitants:

Commune	Population (2023)
Évreux	49,360
Vernon	25,290
Louviers	18,705
Val-de-Reuil	13,245
Gisors	12,410
Pont-Audemer	10,023

== Demographics ==
Historical population

Year	Pop.	±% p.a.
1791	385,206	—
1801	402,796	+0.45%
1806	421,344	+0.90%
1821	416,178	−0.08%
1831	424,248	+0.19%
1841	425,780	+0.04%
1851	415,777	−0.24%
1861	398,661	−0.42%
1872	377,874	−0.49%
1881	364,291	−0.41%
1891	349,471	−0.41%
1901	334,781	−0.43%
1911	323,651	−0.34%
1921	303,159	−0.65%

Year	Pop.	±% p.a.
1931	305,788	+0.09%
1936	303,829	−0.13%
1946	315,902	+0.39%
1954	332,514	+0.64%
1962	361,943	+1.07%
1968	383,385	+0.96%
1975	422,952	+1.41%
1982	462,254	+1.28%
1990	513,818	+1.33%
1999	541,054	+0.58%
2007	572,105	+0.70%
2012	591,616	+0.67%
2017	601,843	+0.34%
2023	602,714	+0.02%

== Politics ==
The President of the Departmental Council is Sébastien Lecornu of La République En Marche!.

Party		seats
•	Socialist Party	12
	Union for a Popular Movement	11
•	Miscellaneous Left	7
•	French Communist Party	4
	Miscellaneous Right	4
	New Centre	3
•	Left Radical Party	2

=== Presidential elections 2nd round ===
Election	Winning candidate	Party	%	2nd place candidate	Party	%
2022	Emmanuel Macron	LREM	48.62	Marine Le Pen	RN	51.38
2017	Emmanuel Macron	LREM	54.35	Marine Le Pen	FN	45.65
2012	Nicolas Sarkozy	UMP	52.45	François Hollande	PS	47.55
2007	Nicolas Sarkozy	UMP	57.37	Ségolène Royal	PS	42.63
2002	Jacques Chirac	RPR	78.22	Jean-Marie Le Pen	FN	21.78

=== Current National Assembly Representatives ===
Constituency	Member	Party
Eure's 1st constituency	Christine Loir	National Rally
Eure's 2nd constituency	Katiana Levavasseur	National Rally
Eure's 3rd constituency	Kévin Mauvieux	National Rally
Eure's 4th constituency	Philippe Brun	Socialist Party
Eure's 5th constituency	Timothée Houssin	National Rally

== Tourism ==
The main tourist attraction is Giverny 4 km (2½ miles) from Vernon) where Claude Monet's house and garden can be seen, as well as other places of interest (see external links, below).

The Abbey of Bec and the Château-Gaillard near Les Andelys are other important tourist attractions.

The Chateau of Buisson de May was built by the royal architect Jacques Denis Antoine from 1781 to 1783.

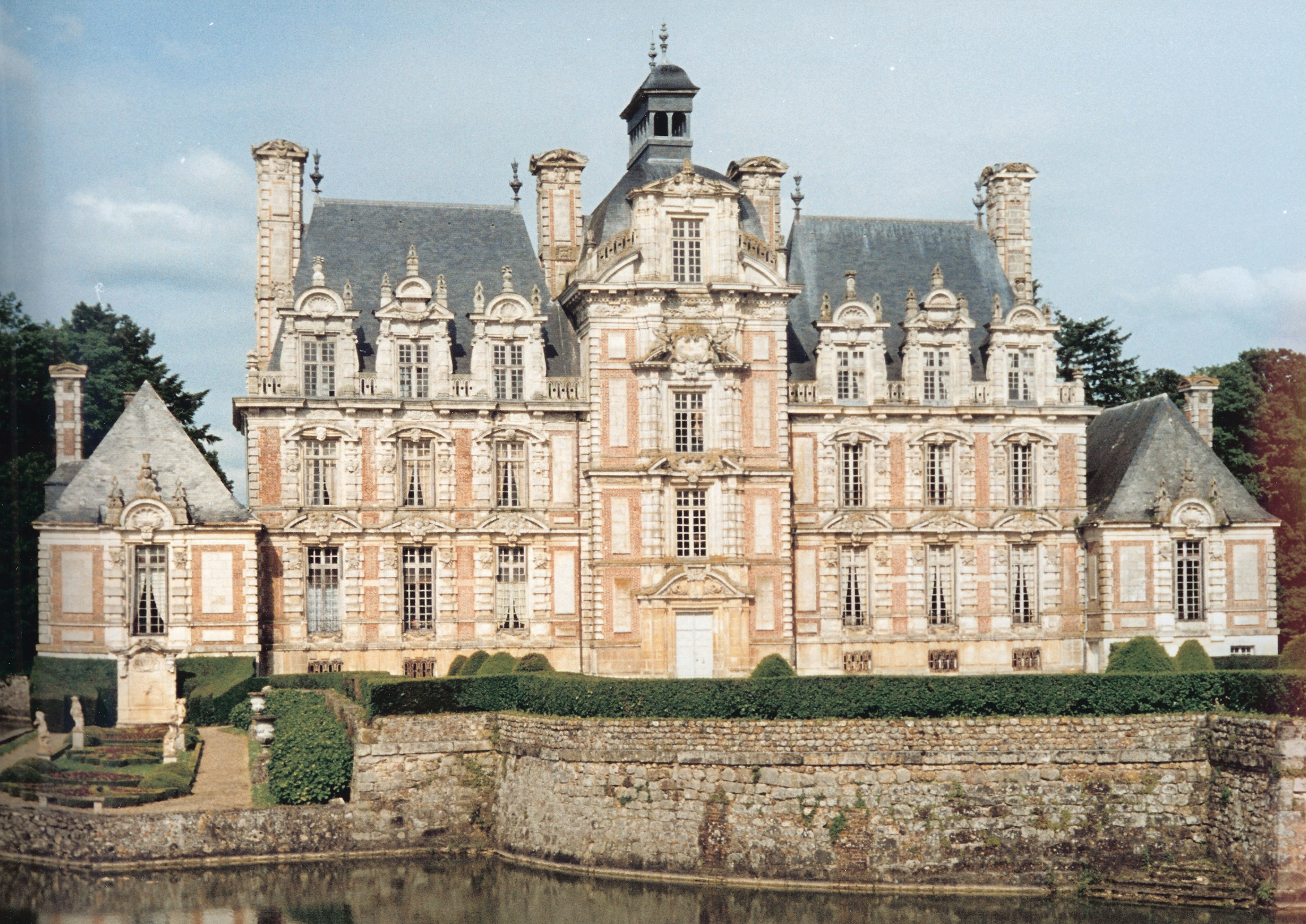
Château de Beaumesnil

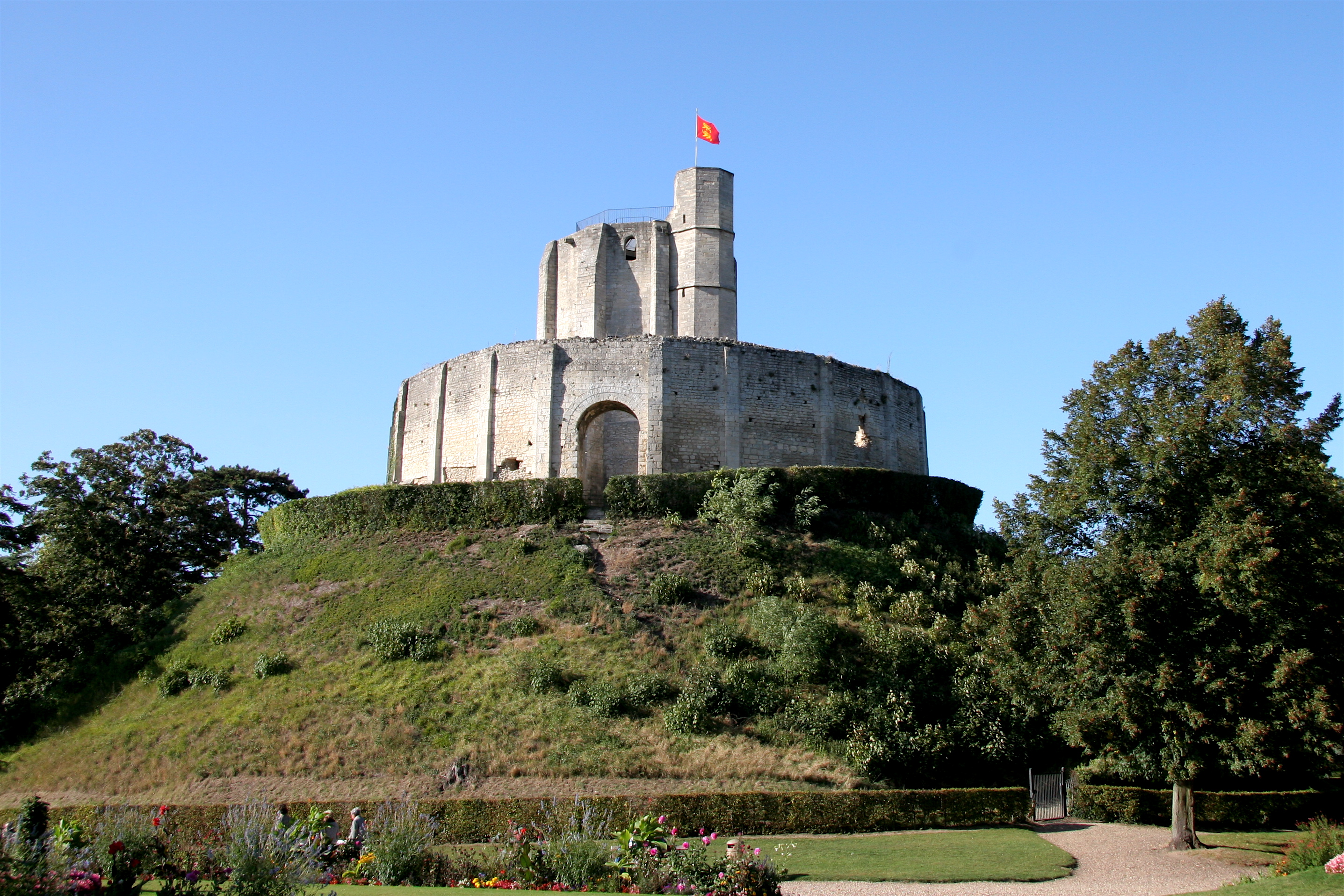
Château de Gisors

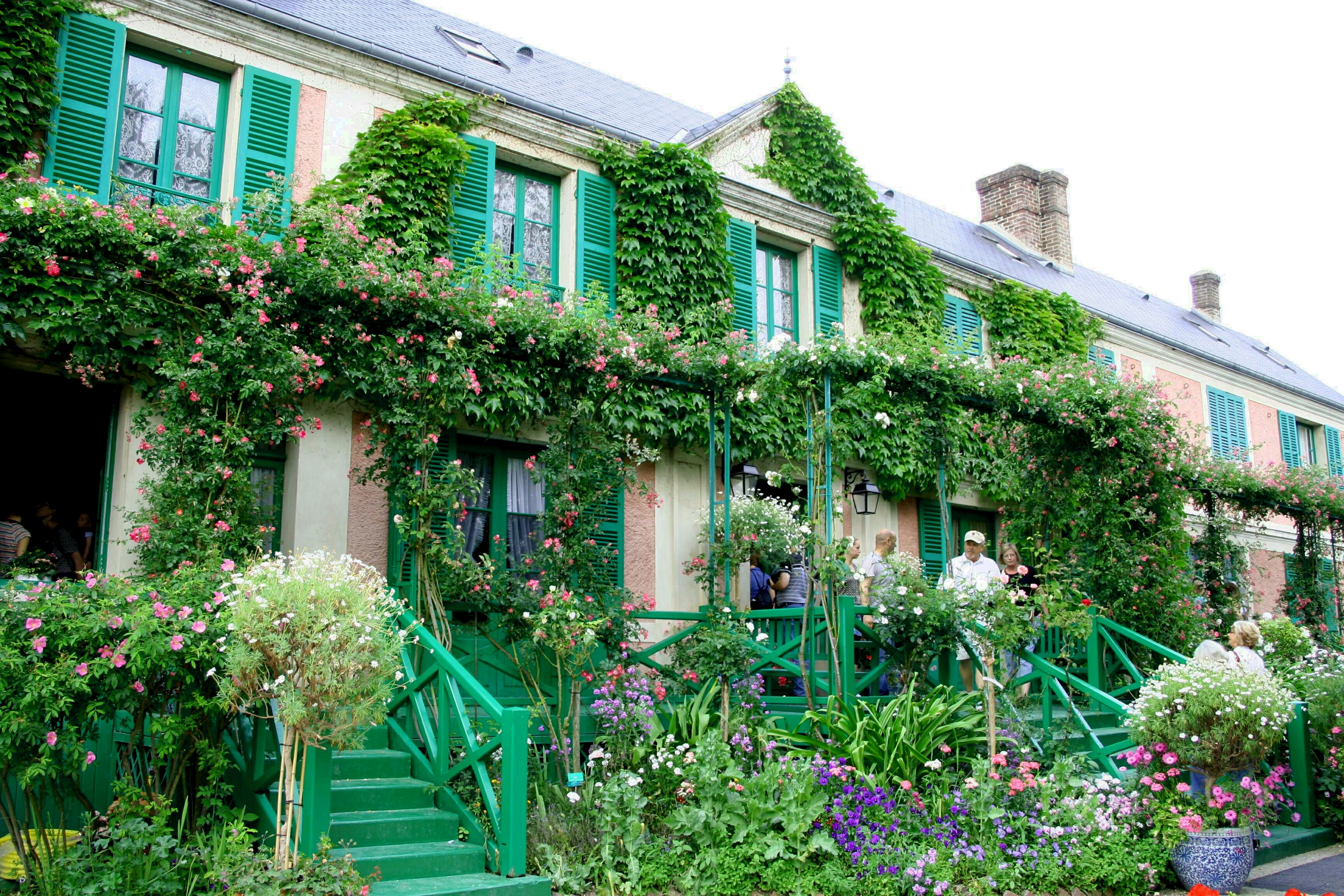
Giverny: Claude Monet's house

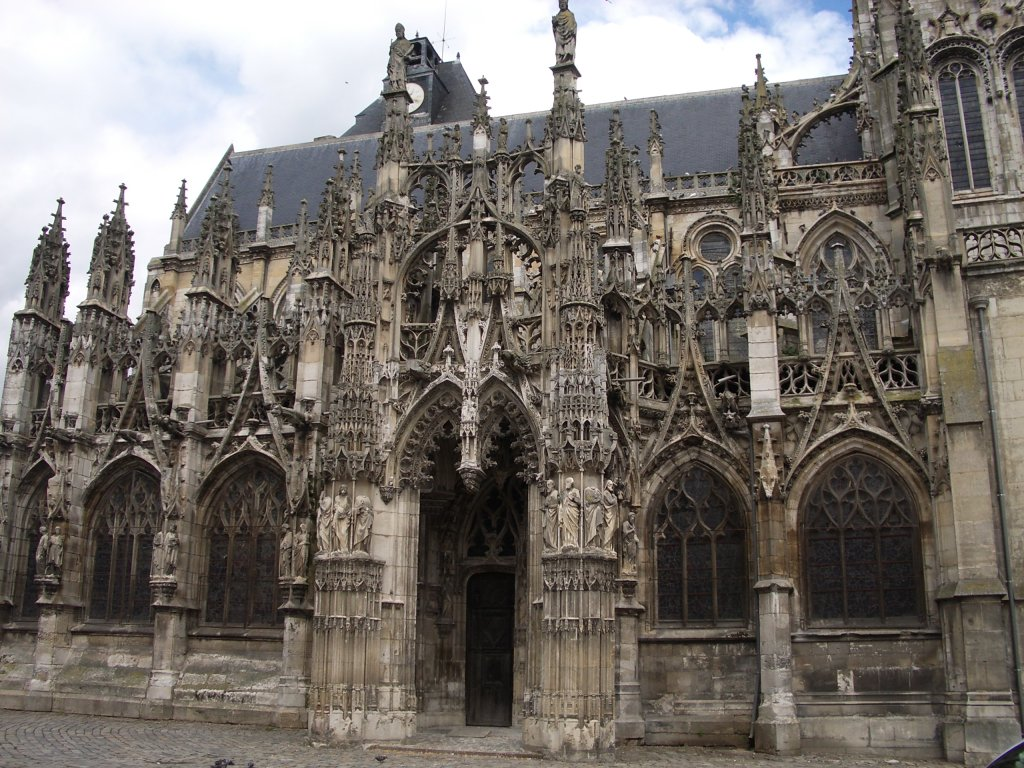
Louviers: Church of Notre-Dame de Louviers

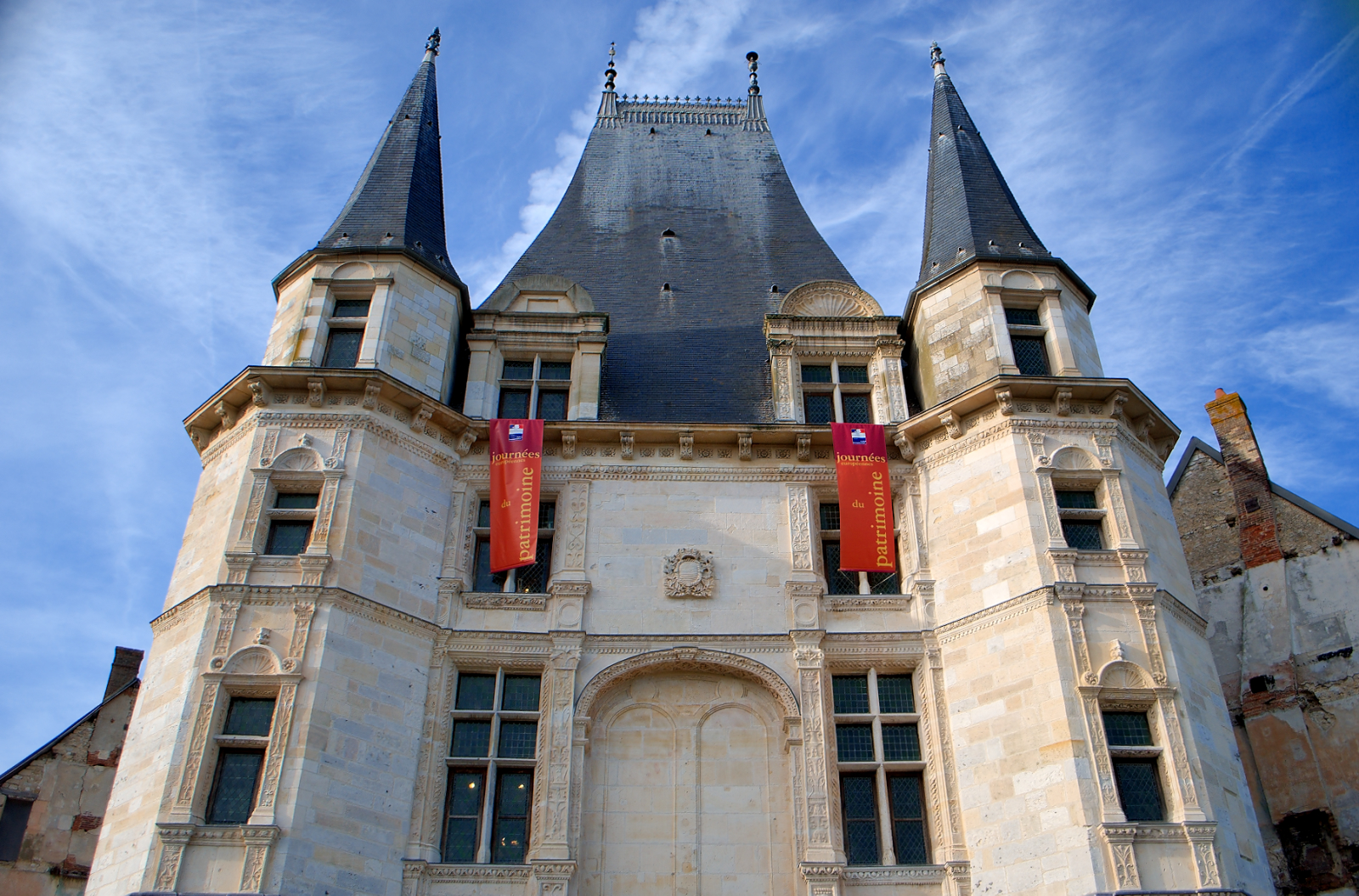
Château de Gaillon

== See also ==
- Cantons of the Eure department
- Communes of the Eure department
- Arrondissements of the Eure department
- Château d'Harcourt
- Château de Gisors
