= Removal of cannabis and cannabis resin from Schedule IV of the Single Convention on narcotic drugs, 1961 =

Change in international cannabis scheduling

The removal of cannabis and cannabis resin from Schedule IV of the Single Convention on narcotic drugs is a change in international law that took place from 2019 to 2021, on the basis of a scientific assessment by the World Health Organization.

Since the United Nations adoption of the Single Convention on Narcotic Drugs in 1961, cannabis and cannabis resin had been listed in Schedule IV, the most tightly restricted category, reserved for drugs that are "particularly liable to abuse and to produce ill effects" and whose "liability is not offset by substantial therapeutic advantages". Its initial placement in this category was not based on science, and no international scientific assessment had been undertaken until 2018. Following the 2 December 2020, vote by the United Nations Commission on Narcotic Drugs, the removal of cannabis and cannabis resin from that Schedule entered into force in 2021. Since 2021, cannabis and cannabis resin remain listed in Schedule I of the Single Convention, alongside extracts and tinctures of cannabis.

== Cannabis in the Single Convention ==
=== Cannabis, resin, and extracts and tinctures ===
The Single Convention is the main international treaty related to Cannabis sativa L. and its products. In its Article 1, the Single Convention defines "cannabis" as the "flowering or fruiting tops of the cannabis plant (excluding the seeds and leaves when not accompanied by the tops) from which the resin has not been extracted, by whatever name they may be designated;" while "cannabis resin" is defined as "the separated resin, whether crude or purified, obtained from the cannabis plant". At the adoption of the Convention in 1961, cannabis and cannabis resin were listed in both Schedule I and Schedule IV.

Schedule I includes substances that are highly addictive and highly liable to substance use disorders, or that are convertible into controlled drugs, while Schedule IV lists "certain drugs listed in Schedule I that are highly addictive and highly liable to abuse and rarely used in medical practice". Schedule IV is a "stricter subset of schedule I, that specifies extra control measures".

=== Cannabis plant, cannabis leaves, and cannabidiol ===
The "cannabis plant" is defined as "any plant of the genus Cannabis" but has never been listed in any Schedule. Only cannabis and cannabis resin are listed in the Schedules of the Single Conventions. Since "drugs" are defined as those substances listed in the Schedules, "cannabis plant" is not considered a drug according to the Single Convention.

The "leaves" of cannabis plants are in a similar case: while it is not listed in the Schedules, and is therefore not a "drug" in the meaning of the Single Convention, "cannabis leaves" are subject to some light measures of control under Article 28 of the convention.

Since only "cannabis", "cannabis resin", and "extracts and tinctures of cannabis" are listed in the Schedules of the Single Convention, some analysts and governments consider that cannabidiol (CBD) is not a "narcotic drug" in the meaning of the Single Convention, while others such as the International Narcotics Control Board consider that actual CBD products are in fact extracts of cannabis and should therefore be considered as Scheduled.

=== Tetrahydrocannabinol ===
delta-9-THC (tetrahydrocannabinol, or dronabinol) is not listed in the Schedules of the Single Convention but in the Schedules of a distinct treaty: the Convention on Psychotropic Substances of 1971. It has its own scheduling history: delta-9-THC was downgraded from Schedule I to Schedule II of the 1971 Convention in 1991, while other isomers of THC (such as delta-8-THC, delta-10-THC, etc.) remained in Schedule I.

== History ==
=== Inclusion in Schedule IV ===
Although treaties preceding the Single Convention "contained the first provisions related to cannabis prohibiting the export of cannabis resin to countries that prohibited its use [...], however, no international attempts were made to control the traditional use of cannabis".

In 1961, the UN Economic and Social Council convened a Plenipotentiary Conference of 73 nations for the negotiation and adoption of the Single convention on narcotic drugs. That meeting was known as the United Nations Conference on Narcotic Drugs.

Under Article 3 of the Single Convention, the World Health Organization is mandated with assessing substances for their inclusion or move in, or withdrawal from the Schedules of the international drug control conventions. Within the WHO, the Expert Committee on Drug Dependence (or ECDD, previously called Expert Committee on "Habit-forming Drugs" and on "Drugs Liable to Produce Addiction") is tasked with the scientific evidence-based assessment of substances. But even before the Single Convention, the committee had this mandate under previous drug control treaties.

The ECDD first included cannabis on its agenda at its 3rd meeting (1952), and then again at its 4th (1953), 5th (1954), and 11th (1960) meetings, before the plenipotentiary conference was convened. They repeatedly concluded that "there is no justification for the medical use of cannabis preparations" and that "there should be an extension of the effort towards the abolition of cannabis from all legitimate medical practice." The assessments have been criticized for their lack of scientific methodology, and reliance on doubtful sources such as reports from South African police at times of the apartheid regime. On the basis of the conclusions drawn by the ECDD, the United Nations Conference on Narcotic Drugs decided to list cannabis and cannabis resin in Schedules I and IV, while listing "extracts and tinctures" only in Schedule I.

In 1970, a letter between U.S. Assistant Secretary of Health Roger O. Egeberg and U.S. congressman Harley O. Staggers suggests that many stakeholders saw the classification in Schedule I and IV of the convention as provisional:

"Some question has been raised whether the use of the plant itself produces 'severe psychological or physical dependence' as required by a schedule I or even schedule II criterion. Since there is still a considerable void in our knowledge of the plant and effects of the active drug contained in it, our recommendation is that marijuana be retained within schedule I at least until the completion of certain studies now underway to resolve the issue."

The "certain studies" refers to the anticipated findings of the National Commission on Marijuana and Drug Abuse. The Commission released a 1972 report favoring decriminalization. However, findings of the commission had no impact on the international scheduling of cannabis.

=== Previous demands for rescheduling ===
There has long been some controversy over whether cannabis is "particularly liable to abuse and to produce ill effects" and whether that "liability is not offset by substantial therapeutic advantages", as required by Schedule IV criteria. Already in 1973, the Commentary on the Single Convention edited by UN Secretary-General pointed out that "should the results of the intensive research which is at the time of this writing being undertaken on the effects of [cannabis and cannabis resin] so warrant, they could be deleted from Schedule IV, and these two drugs, as well as extracts and tinctures of cannabis, could be transferred from Schedule I to Schedule II."

Since the discovery of the endocannabinoid receptor system in the late 1980s, which revolutionized the scientific understanding of the psychopharmacological effects of cannabis, and the important progresses in research related to the medical uses of the plant, questions as to the validity of the placement of cannabis and cannabis resin in Schedule IV increased, seen as representing "a historical anomaly [that] should be reviewed at the earliest opportunity".

In the United States, there has been a number of lawsuits over whether cannabis' Schedule IV status under the Single Convention requires total prohibition at the national level (such as NORML v. Ingersoll 497 F.2d 654 in 1974 or NORML v. DEA 559 F.2d 735 in 1977). In the 2000s, members of the European Parliament such as Kathalijne Buitenweg criticized the Single Convention's cannabis scheduling regime. In 2011, a Canadian Senate committee report noted that:

"The argument for placing cannabis in [Schedule IV] was that it was widely abused. The WHO later found that cannabis could have medical applications after all, but the structure was already in place and no international action has since been taken to correct this anomaly."

The United Nations Committee on Economic, Social and Cultural Rights emphasised in 2020 that the placement of cannabis in Schedule IV had not been validated by any scientific assessment.

==== Mandates for a scientific assessment ====
In fall 2016, NGOs sent open letters to WHO Director-General Margaret Chan, urging her to include cannabis as a review agenda item at the next ECDD meeting. One of the NGOs which sent the letter was in official relation with the WHO, making of its demand a mandate for the ECDD to comply with. Nonetheless, in previous years, several bodies entitled to mandate a scientific review of cannabis by the ECDD had already requested it to do so:

"the CND in 2009 (CND Resolution 52/5), the INCB in 2014, the ECDD itself in 2015, from the Czech republic in 2016 at the 69th World Health Assembly"

In addition, the Caribbean Community also requested an ECDD review of cannabis, although in a report that was only published in 2018, after the review process had started.

=== Scientific assessment by the World Health Organization ===
The scientific assessment was initiated in December 2016 with the announcement at the Commission on Narcotic Drugs by ECDD secretary, Dr Gilles Forte. The ECDD vowed to pre-review cannabis "within the next eighteen months from the 38th meeting" which was held in November 2016.

==== Review process ====
The scientific assessment of substances is divided in two steps: pre-review and critical review. According to the WHO:

"The purpose of the pre-review is to determine whether current information justifies an Expert Committee critical review. The categories of information for evaluating substances in pre-reviews are identical to those used in critical reviews."

As compared with the original assessments of cannabis from the 1950s "hastily drawn up on the back of an envelope, the methodology, quality of work and mechanisms for the review of substances considered for international control have evolved substantially" when the ECDD started to collect data towards a pre-review. The ECDD dedicated special attention to the assessment of various products from the Cannabis plant, which were divided as follows:

- Cannabis plant and cannabis resin
- Extracts and tinctures of cannabis
- Delta-9-tetrahydrocannabinol (THC)
- Cannabidiol (CBD)
- Isomers of THC.

A total of 3 ECDD meetings were involved with the assessment:

- From 6 to 10 November 2017 (39th meeting), the ECDD undertook a pre-review of CBD.
- From 4 to 7 June 2018 (40th meeting), for the first time, the ECDD dedicated a meeting only to the assessment of cannabis-related substances, with:
  - the critical review of CBD,
  - the pre-review of the 4 other products and substances.
- From 12 to 16 November 2018 (41st meeting), the critical review of the remaining 4 cannabis products and substances.

The key finding of the ECDD after these reviews was that:

"cannabis and cannabis resin are not particularly liable to produce ill-effects similar to the effects of the other substances in Schedule IV of the Convention on Narcotic Drugs. In addition, oral preparations of cannabis have shown therapeutic potential for the treatment of pain and other medical conditions such as epilepsy and spasticity associated with multiple sclerosis."

A number of scientists from around the world composed the ECDD:

Patrick Beardsley	Virginia Commonwealth University (United States)	Professor of Pharmacology, Toxicology	Expert at the 39th, 40th and 41st meetings. Rapporteur of the 39th and 40th meetings
Bruna Brands	At the 39th and 40th meetings: Faculty of Medicine, University of Toronto (Canada) At the 41st meeting: Office of Drug Science and Surveillance, Controlled Substances Directorate, Health Canada (Canada)	At the 39th and 40th meetings: Professor of Pharmacology and Toxicology At the 41st meeting: Senior Science Advisor	Expert at the 39th, 40th and 41st meetings. Chair of the 39th and 40th meetings
Ifeoma Toyin Ekwere	Department of Anaesthesiology, University of Benin Teaching Hospital (Nigeria)	Senior Consultant Anaesthesiologist	Expert at the 39th, 40th and 41st meetings
Simon Elliott	Independent (United Kingdom); King's College (United Kingdom)	Consultant Forensic Toxicologist; Visiting professor in Forensic Toxicology	Expert at the 39th, 40th and 41st meetings
Katia Gysling	Pontificia Universidad Católica (Chile)	Professor of Biological Sciences	Temporary adviser at the 39th meeting. Expert at the 40th and 41st meetings
Raka Jain	National Drug Dependence Treatment Centre, All India Institute of Medical Sciences (India)	Professor of Chemistry	Expert at the 39th, 40th and 41st meetings
Pamela Kaduri	Muhimbili University of Health and Allied Sciences (Tanzania) At the 40th and 41st meetings, additionally: University of Toronto (Canada)	Professor of Psychiatry	Expert at the 39th, 40th and 41st meetings. Rapporteur of the 41st meeting
Junishi Kitanaka	Hyogo College of Medicine (Japan)	Professor of Pharmacology	Expert at the 40th and 41st meetings
Sutisa Nudmamud-Thanoi	Faculty of Medical Science, Naresuan University (Thailand)	Professor of Anatomy	Temporary adviser at the 39th meeting. Expert at the 40th and 41st meetings
Afarin Rahimi-Movaghar	Tehran University of Medical Sciences (Iran)	Professor of Psychiatry; Director, Iranian National Centre for Addiction Studies	Expert at the 39th, 40th and 41st meetings. Co-chair of the 41st meeting
Jason White	University of South Australia (Australia)	Professor of Pharmacology; Head of the School of Pharmacy and Medical Sciences	Expert at the 39th, 40th and 41st meetings. Co-chair of the 39th and 40th meetings. Chair of the 41st meeting Lead co-author of the Pre-review report on CBD (39th meeting)

==== Recommendations ====
Besides the recommendation to withdraw "cannabis and cannabis resin" from Schedule IV, a number of recommendations were issued by the ECDD, and transmitted to governments by the Director-General of the WHO on 23 July 2018, 24 January 2019, and 5 August 2020.

In summary, the recommendations were as follows:

Number of the recommendation	ECDD meeting	Content of the recommendation
s.n.	40th (June 2018)	Preparations considered to be pure cannabidiol (CBD) should not be scheduled within the international drug control conventions
5.1	41st (November 2018)	Delete cannabis and cannabis resin from Schedule IV of the 1961 Single Convention
5.2.1	41st (November 2018)	Add delta-9-THC to Schedule I of the 1961 Single Convention
5.2.2	41st (November 2018)	If 5.2.1 is adopted, delete delta-9-THC from Schedule II of the 1971 Convention
5.3.1	41st (November 2018)	If 5.2.2 is adopted, add other isomers of THC to Schedule I of the 1961 Single Convention
5.3.2	41st (November 2018)	If 5.3.1 is adopted, delete other isomers of THC from Schedule I of the 1971 Convention
5.4	41st (November 2018)	Delete extracts and tinctures of cannabis from Schedule I of the 1961 Single Convention
5.5	41st (November 2018)	Give effect to the recommendation of the 40th ECDD meeting [...] by adding a footnote to the entry for cannabis and cannabis resin in Schedule I of the 1961 Single Convention to read "Preparations containing predominantly CBD and not more than 0.2 per cent of delta-9-THC are not under international control”
5.6	41st (November 2018)	Add preparations containing delta-9-THC* to Schedule III of the 1961 Single Convention. * produced either by chemical synthesis or as preparations of cannabis, that are compounded as pharmaceutical preparations with one or more other ingredients and in such a way that delta-9-THC cannot be recovered by readily available means or in a yield which would constitute a risk to public health

=== Adoption of the recommendation ===
Recommendation 5.1 on the withdrawal of cannabis and cannabis resin from Schedule IV, was the only recommendation which was adopted.

==== Delays prior to the vote and intergovernmental discussions at the United Nations ====
Although in general, the Commission on Narcotic Drugs (CND) votes on ECDD recommendations at its next available session after WHO Director-General communicates them, "this particular voting was subject to repeated delays, not only due to the complexity and interconnectedness of the recommendations, but also to organisational problems at WHO leadership and burdensome governmental discussions organised by the successive CND Chairs"

The vote was finally held during a reconvened session of the commission, which is highly unusual. In addition, problems and restrictions linked to the COVID-19 pandemic difficulted the organization of the vote and led to unprecedented breaches in voting procedures, and "hampered the appropriate involvement of civil society stakeholders". Ahead of the vote, dozens of organizations of medical cannabis patients from around the world submitted a joint statement titled "Support patient access to medicine, vote yes!"

==== Vote ====
On 2 December 2020, during its reconvened 63rd session, the Commission on Narcotic Drugs voted to withdraw "cannabis and cannabis resin" from Schedule IV of the Single Convention.

27 countries voted in favour, 25 against, and one abstained.

Regarding the other recommendations, "one did not require a vote, three were rejected and another four were not put on the ballot."

The results and outcome of the vote are contained in the commission's Decision 63/17.

Results of the votes
Voting country	Recommendation 5.1	Recommendation 5.2.1	Recommendation 5.4	Recommendation 5.5
Afghanistan	No	Yes	No	No
Algeria	No	No	No	No
Angola	No	No	No	No
Australia	Yes	Yes	Yes	Yes
Austria	Yes	Yes	Yes	No
Bahrain	No	No	No	No
Belgium	Yes	Yes	Yes	No
Brazil	No	No	No	No
Burkina Faso	No	No	No	No
Canada	Yes	No	Yes	Yes
Chile	No	No	Yes	No
China (Popular Republic of)	No	No	No	No
Colombia	Yes	Yes	Yes	No
Côte d'Ivoire	No	No	No	No
Croatia	Yes	Yes	Yes	No
Cuba	No	No	No	No
Czech Republic	Yes	Yes	Yes	No
Ecuador	Yes	Yes	Yes	Yes
Egypt	No	No	No	No
El Salvador	Yes	No	Yes	No
France	Yes	Yes	Yes	No
Germany	Yes	Yes	Yes	No
Hungary	No	Yes	No	No
India	Yes	No	No	No
Iraq	No	No	No	No
Italy	Yes	Yes	Yes	No
Jamaica	Yes	Yes	No	No
Japan	No	No	No	No
Kazakhstan	No	No	No	No
Kenya	No	No	No	No
Kyrgyzstan	No	No	No	No
Libya	No	No	No	No
Mexico	Yes	No	Yes	No
Morocco	Yes	Yes	Yes	Abstention
Nepal	Yes	Abstention	Abstention	Abstention
Netherlands	Yes	Yes	Yes	No
Nigeria	No	No	No	No
Pakistan	No	No	No	Abstention
Peru	No	Yes	No	Yes
Poland	Yes	Yes	Yes	No
Russian federation	No	No	No	No
South Africa	Yes	Yes	Yes	Yes
Spain	Yes	Yes	Yes	No
Sweden	Yes	Yes	Yes	No
Switzerland	Yes	Yes	Yes	No
Thailand	Yes	Yes	No	Yes
Togo	No	No	No	No
Turkey	No	No	No	No
Turkmenistan	No	No	No	No
Ukraine	Abstention	Abstention	Abstention	Abstention
United Kingdom	Yes	Yes	Yes	No
Uruguay	Yes	No	Yes	No
United States of America	Yes	No	Yes	No

===== Vote of European Union countries =====
In 2017, the Council of the European Union decided that EU countries with a right to vote at the Commission on Narcotic Drugs would agree in advance a common position for their votes. The following year, the European Commission argued that this common voting position was mandatory (sometimes termed "imperative mandate") and not indicative (EU countries would be obliged to vote at the Commission on Narcotic Drugs according to the previously-agreed common EU position). This move was criticised for a number of reasons, in particular the difficulty for EU countries, split between two different United Nations Regional Groups (EEG and WEOG), to negotiate a common position in both their regional group and the EU.

Ahead of the vote, the Council of the European Union (via its Horizontal Drug Group) had agreed to a common position (yes to recommendations 5.1 to 5.4; no to recommendations 5.5 and 5.6). In its explanations of votes, the ambassador of the European External Action Service declared:

"The EU supported the adoption of recommendation 5.1 to delete cannabis and cannabis resin from Schedule IV of the Single Convention on Narcotic Drugs, considering that it would allow more research, in line with our evidence-based drugs policy, on the medical use of cannabis and cannabis resin. It should be noted, however, that these substances continue to be controlled under schedule I of the Single Convention on Narcotic Drugs."

There were 12 member states of the European Union with voting rights at the Commission on Narcotic Drugs on the day of the vote. However, only 11 voted as agreed, since Hungary voted no to recommendations 5.1 and 5.4. In February 2021, the European Commission opened an infringement procedure against the country "for failure to follow the Union position when voting on the World Health Organisation recommendations on cannabis and cannabis-related substances at the United Nations Commission on Narcotic Drugs in December 2020". After a reply from Hungary considered unsatisfactory, the European Commission declared:

"Decisions on the international scheduling of substances under those conventions fall under the exclusive competence of the Union. The Union position – adopted by the Council in November 2020 – is binding on EU Member States, who have to vote accordingly in the Commission on Narcotic Drugs, in line with Article 218(9) TFEU. Hungary voted contrary to the Union position twice during the vote on the WHO recommendations. Cannabis remains a drug subject to international control. The WHO recommendations aimed to ensure that cannabis and cannabis-related substances are subject to the most relevant international control reflecting current scientific and medical knowledge. [...] Hungary now has two months to reply to the arguments raised by the Commission. Otherwise, the Commission may decide to refer the case to the Court of Justice of the European Union."

== Aftermath and consequences ==
Already in the 2000s, representatives of the United Nations Office on Drugs and Crime (such as Cindy Fazey) and the International Narcotics Control Board (then-president Philip O. Emafo) warned that it would be nearly impossible to loosen international cannabis regulations, and that even if the Commission on Narcotic Drugs removed cannabis from Schedule IV, prohibition would remain embedded into the Single Convention.

After the vote, a number of analysts continued to follow these views, arguing that the decision taken would have little legal consequences, if any. Others suggested that the change in legal status could facilitate access and availability to medical cannabis, or even legitimate the legalization of non-medical cannabis under Article 2(9) of the Single Convention.

According to the World Health Organization, the withdrawal of cannabis and cannabis resin from Schedule IV of C61 "will remove some international procedural barriers to research and development of cannabis-based medical products according to national regulatory frameworks". Some commentators argue that, by accepting only the withdrawal from Schedule IV, and not the other ECDD recommendations, the Commission on Narcotic Drugs "might actually be perpetuating the model initiated in the US state of California in 1996 and followed by dozens of other jurisdictions: that of sui generis, locally oriented access programs, reliant on small- and medium-scale businesses and compound botanical medicines".

A number of governments mentioned the withdrawal from Schedule IV in their rationale for national medical cannabis reforms such as Morocco, Spain, Mauritius, Japan, Peru.

In the United States, "[s]cheduling pursuant to international treaty obligations does not require the factual findings that are necessary for other administrative scheduling actions, and may be implemented without regard to the procedures outlined for regular administrative scheduling". For this reason, some have argued that changes in cannabis scheduling at the U.S. federal level may be fast-tracked on these grounds.
