= Andrés Finguerut =

British UN drug control civil servant

Chief, Drug Prevention and Health Branch, UNODC
- In office 2021–2023
- Preceded by: Gilberto Gerra

29th Secretary of the International Narcotics Control Board
- In office 2011–2020
- Preceded by: Jonathan Lucas
- Succeeded by: Mark Colhoun (Stefano Berterame ad'interim)

Secretary of the UN Commission on Narcotic Drugs
- In office 2004–2011
- Preceded by: Jonathan Lucas
- Succeeded by: Jo Dedyne-Aman

Personal details
- Spouse: Helena Johansson
- Education: Master, development economics

Andrés Finguerut is a former United Nations civil servant, successively secretary of the UN Commission on Narcotic Drugs, secretary of the International Narcotics Control Board (2011–2020) and chief of the drug prevention and health branch at the United Nations Office on Drugs and Crime (2020–2023).

== Career ==
After graduating in M.A. in development economics, Finguerut started working as civil servant at the United Nations Office at Vienna.

Finguerut was appointed Secretary of the United Nations' Commission on Narcotic Drugs (CND) in 2004, under the Commissions Secretariat Section of the UNODC's Division for Treaty Affairs. He remained in that position until 2011 when he was replaced by Jo Dedyne-Aman.

In 2011, Finguerut was appointed Secretary of the International Narcotics Control Board (INCB) by Secretary-General of the United Nations Ban Ki-moon, in replacement of Jonathan Lucas. Fingerut was INCB secretary during the chairmanship of Hamid Ghodse, at times of prime relevance for the institution, characterized by an increased diplomatic presence. He was Secretary until 30 June 2020. Upon his departure, the INCB released a communiqué to:

express its appreciation to Mr. Finguerut for his almost nine years at the helm of the INCB secretariat, and for his service to the Board in strengthening international drug control, and in responding to the emerging challenges and the changing nature of the world drug problem.

In June 2020, Finguerut joined the UN Office on Drugs and Crime (UNODC) as chief of the "Drug Prevention and Health Branch" under Director-General Ghada Waly. In that position, he was involved in various working groups with governments and civil society.

== Criticism ==
As CND Secretary, Finguerut was criticized by some civil society groups, including Human Rights Watch, for banning non-governmental organizations from access to the main negotiating forum of the commission.

During Finguerut's term as INCB Secretary, he maintained conflictual relations with some countries, particularly in the case of Bolivia after its withdrawal from the Single Convention on Narcotic Drugs in 2011 and subsequent reservation on coca leaf the next year. Finguerut also opposed countries like Uruguay and Canada after their decisions to legalize cannabis for non-medical use.

His nomination as head of the health section of UNODC at the peak of the COVID-19 pandemic was criticized for his lack of qualifications in health-related sciences.

== See also ==
- United Nations Office on Drugs and Crime
- International Narcotics Control Board
- United Nations Commission on Narcotic Drugs
- United Nations Office at Vienna
- Civil service
- Drug liberalization
- Legality of cannabis
- Civil society campaign

Diplomatic posts
Preceded by Jonathan Lucas	Secretary, Commission on Narcotic Drugs; 2004–2011	Succeeded by Jo Dedyne-Aman
Preceded by Jonathan Lucas	Secretary, INCB; 2011–2020	Succeeded by Mark Colhoun (Stefano Berterame ad'interim)
Preceded by Gilberto Gerra	Chief, Drug Prevention and Health Branch, UNODC; 2020–2023	Succeeded by -
