= International Narcotics Control Board =

International treaty body monitoring licit drug trade

- ^{الهيئة الدولية لمراقبة المخدرات (Arabic)}^{国际麻醉品管制局 (Chinese)}^{Organe International de Contrôle des Stupéfiants (French)}^{Международный Комитет по Контролю над Наркотиками (Russian)}^{Junta Internacional de Fiscalización de Estupefacientes (Spanish)}
- Abbreviation: INCB
- Predecessor: Permanent Central Opium Board and Drug Supervisory Board
- Formation: 1968; 58 years ago
- Founded at: Geneva, Switzerland
- Type: Treaty body
- Legal status: Active
- Purpose: Treaty body of the 1961 Convention, 1971 Convention, and 1988 Convention
- Headquarters: Vienna International Centre (Vienna, Austria)
- Members: 13 Board Members
- President: Sevil Atasoy
- Secretary: Stefano Berterame (ad'interim)
- Main organ: Board
- Website: incb.org

The International Narcotics Control Board (INCB) is an independent treaty body, one of the four treaty-mandated bodies under international drug control law (alongside the Commission on Narcotic Drugs, UNODC on behalf of the Secretary-General, and the WHO).

The INCB is responsible for monitoring the control of substances pursuant to the three United Nations drug control conventions and for assisting Member States in their efforts to implement those conventions. It plays an important role in monitoring the production and trade of narcotics and psychotropics, as well as their availability for medical and scientific purposes, and in deciding which precursors should be regulated.

== History ==
The Board has predecessors since the League of Nations. Following the 1909 Shanghai International Opium Commission, the Second International Opium Convention was adopted in 1925 and established the Permanent Central Opium Board (PCOB) which started its work in 1928. Later on, the 1931 Convention created the Drug Supervisory Body to gather estimates, in complement of the PCOB.

After the dissolution of the League of Nations in 1946, the Lake Success Protocol Amending the Agreements, Conventions and Protocols on Narcotic Drugs transferred the powers and mandate of both Permanent Central Opium Board and Drug Supervisory Board to a specially-created joint body to administer the estimate system. The functions of both bodies were merged into the current INCB with the adoption of the Single Convention on Narcotic Drugs in 1961, and those bodies were superseded when the INCB began its functions on March 2, 1968.

Initially, the composition of the INCB under the Single Convention was strongly influenced by the 1946 Protocol. It inherited mechanisms of nomination from the League of Nations and Office International d'Hygiène Publique.

The mandates and functions of the INCB were later complemented with the adoption of the Convention on Psychotropic Substances in 1971 and the UN Convention Against Illicit Traffic in Narcotic Drugs and Psychotropic Substances in 1988.

Comparison of the role of the INCB with its predecessors within the organisational structure of international drug control
Organisational chart of inter-governmental drug control (as of 1935)	Organisational chart of inter-governmental drug control (as of 2022)

== Treaty mandates ==
The drug control treaties mandates four international bodies: the Board, the World Health Organization, the Secretary-General of the United Nations (nowadays represented by the United Nations Office on Drugs and Crime), and the Commission on Narcotic Drugs. The commission has power to influence drug control policy by advising other bodies and deciding how various substances will be controlled. Enforcement power lies in the mandate of each State Party to the Conventions. The Board has mostly a monitoring and surveillance role.

=== Responsibilities under the 1961 and 1971 Conventions ===
The INCB has a role generally similar under the 1961 and 1971 Conventions. The substances under scrutiny differ.

The 1961 Single Convention, Article 9 provides that the Board shall endeavour to:

- Limit the cultivation, production, manufacture and use of drugs to an adequate amount required for medical and scientific purposes;
- Ensure their availability for such purposes; and
- Prevent illicit cultivation, production and manufacture of, and illicit trafficking in and use of, drugs.

But these refer to monitoring and advice, rather than enforcement. The INCB has no direct enforcement powers.

Articles 12 and 19 of the same Convention give the Board the responsibility of reviewing, confirming, or requesting changes to the annual estimates of needs for narcotic drugs among Parties concerning licit cultivation, production, manufacture, export, import, distribution and trade, with the objective of preventing diversion of drugs from licit sources into the illicit traffic. The estimates do not represent quotas in the strict sense, because the Parties may at any time request changes to their annual estimates, subject to providing the Board with the explanation of the circumstances necessitating such changes. The Board establishes estimates for all nations, including non-Parties to the Single Convention.

Under the 1971 Convention on Psychotropic Substances, similar powers are given to the Board, in regards to psychotropic substances. In addition, Article 18 of the 1971 Convention requires the Board to issue annual reports on its work.

==== Lack of direct enforcement powers and "quasi-judicial" mandate ====
During the negotiations of the Single Convention, governments refused to give the INCB direct enforcement powers. Article 14 of the Single Convention, Article 19 of the 1971 Convention, and Article 22 of the 1988 Convention, give the Board the authority to investigate the failure of any country or region to carry out the convention's provisions. This includes countries that are not Parties to the Conventions. The Board can ask for explanations from the Government in question, propose that a study of the matter be carried out in its territory, and call upon the Government to adopt remedial measures.

If the Board finds that the Government has failed to give satisfactory explanations, or has failed to adopt remedial measures that it has been called upon to take, the Board can call the attention of the Parties, the council, and the commission to the matter. The Board can also publish a report on the matter for communication to all Parties. Under some circumstances, it can penalize a violator by reducing its export quota of opium, under the provisions of Article 21 bis. The Board can even "recommend to the Parties that they stop the export, import, or both, of particular psychotropic substances, from or to the country or region concerned, either for a designated period or until the Board shall be satisfied as to the situation in that country or region."

The Commentary to the Convention on Narcotic Drugs points out, "This is a very serious measure, and it cannot be assumed that the Board has that authority except in very grave situations". Decisions under Article 19 require a two-thirds vote of the Board.

INCB has been criticized for claiming being a "quasi-judicial" body whereas neither the three drug control Conventions nor ECOSOC resolutions provide it with such a mandate. In September 2022, Virginia Patton Prugh, Attorney Advisor at the United States Department of State, declared on the occasion of an intersessional meeting of the Commission on Narcotic Drugs:

Reviewing the many sources discussing INCB mandates, one would assume that the INCB has been designated to sit in judgement of MS in their effort to implement the treaties. If that it the case, it must be found in the treaties. But the treaties do not assign this role: it simply isn't there. The INCB is authorized to administer the system of estimates and the statistical returns, and to support the Parties in implementing the Conventions. But there is no text suggesting that the INCB is given quasi-judicial functions to interpret the treaties, or adjudicate their conformity or compliance. Read the text; look carefully at the words: we, the Parties to the Conventions, are responsible for implementing our obligations, and we are also responsible for interpreting them in good faith.

The position that the INCB is not and should not self-define as a "quasi-judicial" body had been defended by civil society organisations and scholars for a number of years.

=== Responsibilities under the 1988 Convention ===
Article 12 of the 1988 Convention Against Illicit Traffic requires the Board to report annually to the Commission on Narcotic Drugs on the implementation of the convention's restrictions on chemical precursors in Table I and Table II, the treaty's two categories of precursor substances in illicit drug manufacture. The INCB "Red List" lists precursors and chemicals frequently used in illicitly manufacturing narcotics and psychotropic substances under international control.

In the case of a precursor substance not yet regulated, the convention also requires the Board to communicate to the Commission on Narcotic Drugs an assessment of the substance if it finds that:

- The substance is frequently used in the illicit manufacture of a narcotic drug or psychotropic substance; and
- The volume and extent of the illicit manufacture of a narcotic drug or psychotropic substance creates serious public health or social problems, so as to warrant international action.

The Convention requires the Board to notify the United Nations Secretary-General whenever it has information which, in its opinion, may justify adding a substance to, deleting a substance from, or transferring a substance between, the Tables. The Secretary-General then transmits that information to the Parties and the commission, and the Commission makes the decision, "taking into account the comments submitted by the Parties and the comments and recommendations of the Board, whose assessment shall be determinative as to scientific matters, and also taking into due consideration any other relevant factors".

This role of assessment given to the INCB under the 1988 Convention was, under the 1961 and 1971 Convention, was reserved to the World Health Organization.

Notably, this Convention explicitly preludes the INCB from playing any role in the settlement of disputes between two or more Parties relating to the interpretation or application of the convention, instead leaving the resolution of these disputes to the Parties concerned through peaceful means of their own choice.

== Structure ==
=== Membership of the Board ===
Article 9 of the Single Convention specifies that the Board shall be made up of thirteen members elected by the UN Economic and Social Council (ECOSOC), including:

- Three members with medical, pharmacological or pharmaceutical experience from a list of at least five persons nominated by the World Health Organization; and
- Ten members from a list of persons nominated by the Members of the United Nations and by Parties which are not Members of the United Nations.

The Article requires the council to make arrangements to ensure the Board's independence. Article 10 specifies that "[t]he members of the Board shall serve for a period of five years, and may be re-elected."

The lengthy terms, and the fact that the Board is made up of individuals rather than nation-states, help buffer the Board from political pressure. Historians have argued that the requirement that members with "medical, pharmacological or pharmaceutical experience" be placed on the Board was the result of lobbying by the pharmaceuticals industry.

The provision that three members would be WHO nominees is similar to provision in previous treaties, which had two of the four members of the Drug Supervisory Body to be appointed by the Office International d'Hygiène Publique (OIHP), the predecessor of WHO. The requirement that INCB nominees be appointed by ECOSOC in the Single Convention is inherited from the previous treaty provision.

==== Presidency ====
Board Members elect a president among them for a one-year term.

=== Secretariat ===
Although the 13 Members of the Board are independent, the Secretariat, officers, and staff of the INCB are entrusted to the United Nations. States parties to the 1961 Convention already expressed their desire to see INCB Secretariat integrated within the United Nations system under Secretary-General:

That secretariat is an integral part of the Secretariat of the United Nations; while under the full administrative control of the Secretary-General, it is bound to carry out the decisions of the Board; The members of the secretariat are appointed or assigned by the Secretary-General; the head of that secretariat is appointed or assigned in consultation with the Board.

The Commentary to the Convention on Psychotropic Substances notes, "Since the Board is not in continuous session and in fact meets only a few weeks each year, it has to delegate to its secretariat the required authority in order to maintain between its sessions 'the mechanism for a continuing dialogue' with Governments". Additionally, in 1990, the Board noted that "by decision of the Secretary-General, the Director-General of the United Nations Office at Vienna serves as Coordinator of all United Nations drug control-related activities." Resolution 1991/46 of the United Nations Economic and Social Council entrusted the management of INCB Secretariat to the agency known today as United Nations Office on Drugs and Crime.

Historical list of INCB Presidents, Members, and Secretaries
Year	Secretary	President	Member No. 1	Member No. 2	Member No. 3	Member No. 4	Member No. 5	Member No. 6	Member No. 7	Member No. 8	Member No. 9	Member No. 10	Member No. 11	Member No. 12	Member No. 13
1968	Joseph Dittert	Sir Harry Greenfield													
1969	Joseph Dittert	Sir Harry Greenfield													
1970	Joseph Dittert	Sir Harry Greenfield													
1971	Joseph Dittert	Sir Harry Greenfield													
1972	Joseph Dittert	Sir Harry Greenfield													
1973	Joseph Dittert	Sir Harry Greenfield													
1974	Joseph Dittert	Sir Harry Greenfield													
1974	Joseph Dittert	Paul Reuter													
1975	Joseph Dittert	Paul Reuter													
1976	Joseph Dittert	Paul Reuter													
1977	Joseph Dittert	Paul Reuter													
1977	Stefan Stepczyński	Paul Reuter											Molsen Kchouk (Tunisia)		
1978	Stefan Stepczyński	Paul Reuter											Molsen Kchouk (Tunisia)		
1979	Abdelaziz Bahi	Paul Reuter											Molsen Kchouk (Tunisia)		
1980	Abdelaziz Bahi	Paul Reuter											Molsen Kchouk (Tunisia)		
1981	Abdelaziz Bahi	Paul Reuter											Molsen Kchouk (Tunisia)		
1982	Abdelaziz Bahi	Paul Reuter											Molsen Kchouk (Tunisia)		
1983	Abdelaziz Bahi	Victorio V. Olguin											Molsen Kchouk (Tunisia)		
1984	Abdelaziz Bahi	Victorio V. Olguin											Molsen Kchouk (Tunisia)		
1985	Abdelaziz Bahi	Betty C. Gough	Zhi-Ji Cai (China)										Molsen Kchouk (Tunisia)		
1986	Abdelaziz Bahi	Betty C. Gough	Zhi-Ji Cai (China)										Molsen Kchouk (Tunisia)		
1987	Abdelaziz Bahi	Sahibzada Raoof Ali Khan	Zhi-Ji Cai (China)			Sirad Atmodjo (Indonesia)							Molsen Kchouk (Tunisia)		
1988	Abdelaziz Bahi	Sahibzada Raoof Ali Khan	Zhi-Ji Cai (China)			Sirad Atmodjo (Indonesia)							Molsen Kchouk (Tunisia)		
1989	Abdelaziz Bahi	Sahibzada Raoof Ali Khan	Zhi-Ji Cai (China)			Sirad Atmodjo (Indonesia)							Molsen Kchouk (Tunisia)		
1989	Abdelaziz Bahi	Ben Huyghe-Braeckmans	Zhi-Ji Cai (China)			Sirad Atmodjo (Indonesia)							Molsen Kchouk (Tunisia)		
1990	Liselotte Waldheim-Natural	Betty C. Gough	Zhi-Ji Cai (China)	Huascar Caiias Kauffmann (Bolivia)	Marith Vasudev Narajan Rao (India)	Sirad Atmodjo (Indonesia)	Oskar Schroeder (Austria)						Molsen Kchouk (Tunisia)	General Mohamed Mansour (Egypt)	
1991	Herbert Schaepe	Oskar Schroeder	Zhi-Ji Cai (China)	Huascar Caiias Kauffmann (Bolivia)	Marith Vasudev Narajan Rao (India)	Sirad Atmodjo (Indonesia)	Oskar Schroeder (Austria)						Molsen Kchouk (Tunisia)	General Mohamed Mansour (Egypt)	
1992	Herbert Schaepe	Oskar Schroeder	Zhi-Ji Cai (China)	Huascar Caiias Kauffmann (Bolivia)	Marith Vasudev Narajan Rao (India)	Sirad Atmodjo (Indonesia)	Oskar Schroeder (Austria)	Salubzada Raoof Ali Khan (Pakistan)	Dr. Manuel Quijano-Narezo (Mexico)	Gottfried Machata (Austria)	Hamid Ghodse (Iran)	Dr. Bunsom Martin (Thailand)	Molsen Kchouk (Tunisia)	General Mohamed Mansour (Egypt)	Amb. Herbert S. Okun (US)
1993	Herbert Schaepe	Hamid Ghodse	Zhi-Ji Cai (China)	Huascar Caiias Kauffmann (Bolivia)	Marith Vasudev Narajan Rao (India)	Sirad Atmodjo (Indonesia)	Oskar Schroeder (Austria)	Salubzada Raoof Ali Khan (Pakistan)	Dr. Manuel Quijano-Narezo (Mexico)	Gottfried Machata (Austria)	Hamid Ghodse (Iran)	Dr. Bunsom Martin (Thailand)	Molsen Kchouk (Tunisia)	General Mohamed Mansour (Egypt)	Amb. Herbert S. Okun (US)
1994	Herbert Schaepe	Hamid Ghodse	Zhi-Ji Cai (China)	Huascar Caiias Kauffmann (Bolivia)	Marith Vasudev Narajan Rao (India)	Sirad Atmodjo (Indonesia)	Oskar Schroeder (Austria)	Salubzada Raoof Ali Khan (Pakistan)	Dr. Manuel Quijano-Narezo (Mexico)	Gottfried Machata (Austria)	Hamid Ghodse (Iran)	Dr. Bunsom Martin (Thailand)	Molsen Kchouk (Tunisia)	General Mohamed Mansour (Egypt)	Amb. Herbert S. Okun (US)
1995	Herbert Schaepe	Oskar Schroeder	Zhi-Ji Cai (China)	Huascar Caiias Kauffmann (Bolivia)	Marith Vasudev Narajan Rao (India)	Sirad Atmodjo (Indonesia)	Oskar Schroeder (Austria)	Prof. Alfredo Pemjean (Chile)	Dr. Manuel Quijano-Narezo (Mexico)	Gottfried Machata (Austria)	Hamid Ghodse (Iran)	Dr. Bunsom Martin (Thailand)	António Lourenço Martins (Portugal)	General Mohamed Mansour (Egypt)	Amb. Herbert S. Okun (US)
1995	Herbert Schaepe	Oskar Schroeder	Edoward A. Babasan (Russia)	Dil Jan Khan (Pakistan)	Elba Torres Graterol (Venezuela)	Sirad Atmodjo (Indonesia)	Oskar Schroeder (Austria)	Prof. Alfredo Pemjean (Chile)	Dr. Manuel Quijano-Narezo (Mexico)	Gottfried Machata (Austria)	Hamid Ghodse (Iran)	Dr. Bunsom Martin (Thailand)	António Lourenço Martins (Portugal)	General Mohamed Mansour (Egypt)	Amb. Herbert S. Okun (US)
1996	Herbert Schaepe	Oskar Schroeder	Edoward A. Babasan (Russia)	Dil Jan Khan (Pakistan)	Elba Torres Graterol (Venezuela)	Sirad Atmodjo (Indonesia)	Oskar Schroeder (Austria)	Prof. Alfredo Pemjean (Chile)	Dr. Manuel Quijano-Narezo (Mexico)	Gottfried Machata (Austria)	Hamid Ghodse (Iran)	Dr. Bunsom Martin (Thailand)	António Lourenço Martins (Portugal)	General Mohamed Mansour (Egypt)	Amb. Herbert S. Okun (US)
1997	Herbert Schaepe	Hamid Ghodse	Edoward A. Babasan (Russia)	Dil Jan Khan (Pakistan)	Elba Torres Graterol (Venezuela)	Sirad Atmodjo (Indonesia)	Oskar Schroeder (Austria)	Prof. Alfredo Pemjean (Chile)	Dr. Manuel Quijano-Narezo (Mexico)	Gottfried Machata (Austria)	Hamid Ghodse (Iran)	Dr. Bunsom Martin (Thailand)	António Lourenço Martins (Portugal)	General Mohamed Mansour (Egypt)	Amb. Herbert S. Okun (US)
1997	Herbert Schaepe	Hamid Ghodse	Edoward A. Babasan (Russia)	Dil Jan Khan (Pakistan)	Elba Torres Graterol (Venezuela)	Sirad Atmodjo (Indonesia)	Oskar Schroeder (Austria)	Prof. Alfredo Pemjean (Chile)	Nelia Cortes-Maramba (Philippines)	Jacques Franquet (France)	Hamid Ghodse (Iran)	Alfonso Gómez-Méndez(Colombia)	António Lourenço Martins (Portugal)	General Mohamed Mansour (Egypt)	Amb. Herbert S. Okun (US)
1998	Herbert Schaepe	Hamid Ghodse	Edoward A. Babasan (Russia)	Dil Jan Khan (Pakistan)	Elba Torres Graterol (Venezuela)	Chinmay Chakrabarty(India)	Oskar Schroeder (Austria)	Prof. Alfredo Pemjean (Chile)	Nelia Cortes-Maramba (Philippines)	Jacques Franquet (France)	Hamid Ghodse (Iran)	Alfonso Gómez-Méndez(Colombia)	António Lourenço Martins (Portugal)	General Mohamed Mansour (Egypt)	Amb. Herbert S. Okun (US)
1999	Herbert Schaepe	Antonio Lourenço Martins	Edoward A. Babasan (Russia)	Dil Jan Khan (Pakistan)	Elba Torres Graterol (Venezuela)	Chinmay Chakrabarty(India)	Oskar Schroeder (Austria)	Prof. Alfredo Pemjean (Chile)	Nelia Cortes-Maramba (Philippines)	Jacques Franquet (France)	Hamid Ghodse (Iran)	Sergio Uribe Ramirez (Colombia)	António Lourenço Martins (Portugal)	General Mohamed Mansour (Egypt)	Amb. Herbert S. Okun (US)
2000	Herbert Schaepe	Hamid Ghodse	Edoward A. Babasan (Russia)	Dil Jan Khan (Pakistan)	Elba Torres Graterol (Venezuela)	Chinmay Chakrabarty(India)	Oskar Schroeder (Austria)	Prof. Alfredo Pemjean (Chile)	Nelia Cortes-Maramba (Philippines)	Jacques Franquet (France)	Hamid Ghodse (Iran)	Sergio Uribe Ramirez (Colombia)	António Lourenço Martins (Portugal)	General Mohamed Mansour (Egypt)	Amb. Herbert S. Okun (US)
2000	Herbert Schaepe	Hamid Ghodse	Edoward A. Babasan (Russia)	Dil Jan Khan (Pakistan)		Chinmay Chakrabarty(India)	Nüzhet Kandemir (Turkey)	Philip Onagwele Emafo (Nigeria)	Nelia Cortes-Maramba (Philippines)	Jacques Franquet (France)	Hamid Ghodse (Iran)	Sergio Uribe Ramirez (Colombia)	Prof. Jiwang Zheng (China)	Maria Elena Medina-Mora (Mexico)	Amb. Herbert S. Okun (US)
2001	Herbert Schaepe	Hamid Ghodse	Edoward A. Babasan (Russia)	Dil Jan Khan (Pakistan)		Chinmay Chakrabarty(India)	Nüzhet Kandemir (Turkey)	Philip Onagwele Emafo (Nigeria)	Nelia Cortes-Maramba (Philippines)	Jacques Franquet (France)	Hamid Ghodse (Iran)	Sergio Uribe Ramirez (Colombia)	Prof. Jiwang Zheng (China)	Maria Elena Medina-Mora (Mexico)	Amb. Herbert S. Okun (US)
2002	Herbert Schaepe	Philip Onagwele Emafo	Edoward A. Babasan (Russia)	Dil Jan Khan (Pakistan)	Elisaldo Luiz de Arajo Carlini (Brazil)	Chinmay Chakrabarty(India)	Nüzhet Kandemir (Turkey)	Philip Onagwele Emafo (Nigeria)	Nelia Cortes-Maramba (Philippines)	Jacques Franquet (France)	Hamid Ghodse (Iran)	Sergio Uribe Ramirez (Colombia)	Prof. Jiwang Zheng (China)	Maria Elena Medina-Mora (Mexico)	Amb. Herbert S. Okun (US)
2002	Herbert Schaepe	Philip Onagwele Emafo	Edoward A. Babasan (Russia)	Madan Mohan Bhatnagar (India)		Rainer Wolfgang Schmid (Austria)	Nüzhet Kandemir (Turkey)	Philip Onagwele Emafo (Nigeria)	Robert Jean Joseph Chretien Lousberg (Netherlands)	Jacques Franquet (France)	Hamid Ghodse (Iran)	Rosa Maria del Castillo Rosas (Peru)	Prof. Jiwang Zheng (China)	Maria Elena Medina-Mora (Mexico)	Amb. Melvyn Levitsky (US)
2003	Herbert Schaepe	Philip Onagwele Emafo	Edoward A. Babasan (Russia)	Madan Mohan Bhatnagar (India)		Rainer Wolfgang Schmid (Austria)	Nüzhet Kandemir (Turkey)	Philip Onagwele Emafo (Nigeria)	Robert Jean Joseph Chretien Lousberg (Netherlands)	Jacques Franquet (France)	Hamid Ghodse (Iran)		Prof. Jiwang Zheng (China)	Maria Elena Medina-Mora (Mexico)	Amb. Melvyn Levitsky (US)
2004	Koli Kouame (Ivory Coast)	Hamid Ghodse	Edoward A. Babasan (Russia)	Madan Mohan Bhatnagar (India)		Rainer Wolfgang Schmid (Austria)	Nüzhet Kandemir (Turkey)	Philip Onagwele Emafo (Nigeria)	Robert Jean Joseph Chretien Lousberg (Netherlands)	Gilberto Gerra (Italy)	Hamid Ghodse (Iran)		Prof. Jiwang Zheng (China)	Maria Elena Medina-Mora (Mexico)	Amb. Melvyn Levitsky (US)
2005	Koli Kouame (Ivory Coast)	Hamid Ghodse	Edoward A. Babasan (Russia)	Madan Mohan Bhatnagar (India)		Rainer Wolfgang Schmid (Austria)	Nüzhet Kandemir (Turkey)	Philip Onagwele Emafo (Nigeria)	Robert Jean Joseph Chretien Lousberg (Netherlands)	Gilberto Gerra (Italy)	Hamid Ghodse (Iran)		Prof. Jiwang Zheng (China)	Maria Elena Medina-Mora (Mexico)	Amb. Melvyn Levitsky (US)
2005	Koli Kouame (Ivory Coast)	Hamid Ghodse	Tatyana Borisovna Dmitrieva (Russia)	Madan Mohan Bhatnagar (India)	Joseph Bediako Asare (Ghana)	Rainer Wolfgang Schmid (Austria)	Sevil Atasoy (Turkey)	Philip Onagwele Emafo (Nigeria)	Robert Jean Joseph Chretien Lousberg (Netherlands)	Gilberto Gerra (Italy)	Hamid Ghodse (Iran)	Dr. Camilo Uribe Granja (Colombia)		Maria Elena Medina-Mora (Mexico)	Amb. Melvyn Levitsky (US)
2006	Koli Kouame (Ivory Coast)	Philip Onagwele Emafo	Tatyana Borisovna Dmitrieva (Russia)	Madan Mohan Bhatnagar (India)	Joseph Bediako Asare (Ghana)	Rainer Wolfgang Schmid (Austria)	Sevil Atasoy (Turkey)	Philip Onagwele Emafo (Nigeria)	Robert Jean Joseph Chretien Lousberg (Netherlands)	Gilberto Gerra (Italy)	Hamid Ghodse (Iran)	Dr. Camilo Uribe Granja (Colombia)		Major Brian Watters (Australia)	Amb. Melvyn Levitsky (US)
2007	Koli Kouame (Ivory Coast)	Philip Onagwele Emafo	Tatyana Borisovna Dmitrieva (Russia)	Madan Mohan Bhatnagar (India)	Joseph Bediako Asare (Ghana)	Rainer Wolfgang Schmid (Austria)	Sevil Atasoy (Turkey)	Philip Onagwele Emafo (Nigeria)	Robert Jean Joseph Chretien Lousberg (Netherlands)		Hamid Ghodse (Iran)	Dr. Camilo Uribe Granja (Colombia)		Major Brian Watters (Australia)	Amb. Melvyn Levitsky (US)
2007	Koli Kouame (Ivory Coast)	Philip Onagwele Emafo	Tatyana Borisovna Dmitrieva (Russia)	Madan Mohan Bhatnagar (India)	Joseph Bediako Asare (Ghana)	Sri Suryawati (Indonesia)	Sevil Atasoy (Turkey)	Philip Onagwele Emafo (Nigeria)	Robert Jean Joseph Chretien Lousberg (Netherlands)	Carola Lander (Germany)	Hamid Ghodse (Iran)	Dr. Camilo Uribe Granja (Colombia)	Prof. Xin Yu (China)	Major Brian Watters (Australia)	Amb. Melvyn Levitsky (US)
2008	Koli Kouame (Ivory Coast)	Hamid Ghodse	Tatyana Borisovna Dmitrieva (Russia)	Raymond Yans (Belgium)	Joseph Bediako Asare (Ghana)	Sri Suryawati (Indonesia)	Sevil Atasoy (Turkey)	Philip Onagwele Emafo (Nigeria)	Robert Jean Joseph Chretien Lousberg (Netherlands)	Carola Lander (Germany)	Hamid Ghodse (Iran)	Dr. Camilo Uribe Granja (Colombia)	Prof. Xin Yu (China)	Major Brian Watters (Australia)	Amb. Melvyn Levitsky (US)
2009	Koli Kouame (Ivory Coast)	Sevil Atasoy	Tatyana Borisovna Dmitrieva (Russia)	Raymond Yans (Belgium)	Joseph Bediako Asare (Ghana)	Sri Suryawati (Indonesia)	Sevil Atasoy (Turkey)	Philip Onagwele Emafo (Nigeria)	Robert Jean Joseph Chretien Lousberg (Netherlands)	Carola Lander (Germany)	Hamid Ghodse (Iran)	Dr. Camilo Uribe Granja (Colombia)	Prof. Xin Yu (China)	Major Brian Watters (Australia)	Amb. Melvyn Levitsky (US)
2010	Jonathan Lucas (Seychelles)	Hamid Ghodse	Tatyana Borisovna Dmitrieva (Russia)	Raymond Yans (Belgium)	Joseph Bediako Asare (Ghana)	Sri Suryawati (Indonesia)	Sevil Atasoy (Turkey)	Philip Onagwele Emafo (Nigeria)	Robert Jean Joseph Chretien Lousberg (Netherlands)	Carola Lander (Germany)	Hamid Ghodse (Iran)	Dr. Camilo Uribe Granja (Colombia)	Prof. Xin Yu (China)	Major Brian Watters (Australia)	Amb. Melvyn Levitsky (US)
2011	Andres Finguerut (UK)	Hamid Ghodse		Raymond Yans (Belgium)		Sri Suryawati (Indonesia)			Robert Jean Joseph Chretien Lousberg (Netherlands)	Carola Lander (Germany)	Hamid Ghodse (Iran)		Prof. Xin Yu (China)		Amb. Melvyn Levitsky (US)
2012	Andres Finguerut (UK)	Raymond Yans		Raymond Yans (Belgium)		Sri Suryawati (Indonesia)			Robert Jean Joseph Chretien Lousberg (Netherlands)	Carola Lander (Germany)	Hamid Ghodse (Iran)		Prof. Xin Yu (China)		Amb. Melvyn Levitsky (US)
2012	Andres Finguerut (UK)	Raymond Yans													Amb. David T. Johnson (US)
2013	Andres Finguerut (UK)	Raymond Yans													Amb. David T. Johnson (US)
2014	Andres Finguerut (UK)	Lochan Naidoo													Amb. David T. Johnson (US)
2015	Andres Finguerut (UK)	Werner Sipp		Jagjit Pavadia (India)				Jallal Toufiq (Morocco)	Bernard Leroy (France)					Richard P. Mattick (Australia)	Amb. David T. Johnson (US)
2016	Andres Finguerut (UK)	Werner Sipp		Jagjit Pavadia (India)				Jallal Toufiq (Morocco)	Bernard Leroy (France)					Richard P. Mattick (Australia)	Amb. David T. Johnson (US)
2017	Andres Finguerut (UK)	Viroj Sumyai	Galina A. Korchagina (Russia)	Jagjit Pavadia (India)	Luis A. Otárola Peñaranda (Peru)	Raúl Martín Del Campo Sánchez (Mexico)	Sevil Atasoy (Turkey)	Jallal Toufiq (Morocco)	Bernard Leroy (France)	Cornelis P. de Joncheere (Netherlands)				Richard P. Mattick (Australia)	Amb. David T. Johnson (US)
2018	Andres Finguerut (UK)	Viroj Sumyai	Galina A. Korchagina (Russia)	Jagjit Pavadia (India)	Luis A. Otárola Peñaranda (Peru)	Raúl Martín Del Campo Sánchez (Mexico)	Sevil Atasoy (Turkey)	Jallal Toufiq (Morocco)	Bernard Leroy (France)	Cornelis P. de Joncheere (Netherlands)				Richard P. Mattick (Australia)	Amb. David T. Johnson (US)
2019	Andres Finguerut (UK)	Cornelis P. de Joncheere	Galina A. Korchagina (Russia)	Jagjit Pavadia (India)	Luis A. Otárola Peñaranda (Peru)	Raúl Martín Del Campo Sánchez (Mexico)	Sevil Atasoy (Turkey)	Jallal Toufiq (Morocco)	Bernard Leroy (France)	Cornelis P. de Joncheere (Netherlands)				Richard P. Mattick (Australia)	Amb. David T. Johnson (US)
2020	Stefano Berterame(Italy)	Cornelis P. de Joncheere	Galina A. Korchagina (Russia)	Jagjit Pavadia (India)	Luis A. Otárola Peñaranda (Peru)	Raúl Martín Del Campo Sánchez (Mexico)	Sevil Atasoy (Turkey)	Jallal Toufiq (Morocco)	Bernard Leroy (France)	Cornelis P. de Joncheere (Netherlands)	Viviana Manrique Zuluaga (Colombia)	Cesar T. Arce Rivas (Paraguay)	Prof. Zukiswa Zingela (South Africa)	Richard P. Mattick (Australia)	Amb. David T. Johnson (US)
2021	Mark Colhoun (South Africa)	Jagjit Pavadia	Galina A. Korchagina (Russia)	Jagjit Pavadia (India)	Luis A. Otárola Peñaranda (Peru)	Raúl Martín Del Campo Sánchez (Mexico)	Sevil Atasoy (Turkey)	Jallal Toufiq (Morocco)	Bernard Leroy (France)	Cornelis P. de Joncheere (Netherlands)	Viviana Manrique Zuluaga (Colombia)	Cesar T. Arce Rivas (Paraguay)	Prof. Zukiswa Zingela (South Africa)	Richard P. Mattick (Australia)	Amb. David T. Johnson (US)
2022	Mark Colhoun (South Africa)	Jagjit Pavadia	Galina A. Korchagina (Russia)	Jagjit Pavadia (India)	Luis A. Otárola Peñaranda (Peru)	Raúl Martín Del Campo Sánchez (Mexico)	Sevil Atasoy (Turkey)	Jallal Toufiq (Morocco)	Bernard Leroy (France)	Cornelis P. de Joncheere (Netherlands)	Viviana Manrique Zuluaga (Colombia)	Cesar T. Arce Rivas (Paraguay)	Prof. Zukiswa Zingela (South Africa)	Richard Muscat (Malta)	Amb. David T. Johnson (US)
2023	Mark Colhoun (South Africa)	Jagjit Pavadia	Galina A. Korchagina (Russia)	Jagjit Pavadia (India)	N. Larissa Razanadimby (Madagascar)	Lin Lu (China)	Sevil Atasoy (Turkey)	Jallal Toufiq (Morocco)	Bernard Leroy (France)	Cornelis P. de Joncheere (Netherlands)	Viviana Manrique Zuluaga (Colombia)	Cesar T. Arce Rivas (Paraguay)	Prof. Zukiswa Zingela (South Africa)	Pavel Pachta (Czechia)	Amb. David T. Johnson (US)
2023	Mark Colhoun (South Africa)	Jallal Toufiq	Galina A. Korchagina (Russia)	Jagjit Pavadia (India)	N. Larissa Razanadimby (Madagascar)	Lin Lu (China)	Sevil Atasoy (Turkey)	Jallal Toufiq (Morocco)	Pierre Lapaque (France)	Cornelis P. de Joncheere (Netherlands)	Mariângela Batista Galvão Simão (Brazil)	Cesar T. Arce Rivas (Paraguay)	Prof. Zukiswa Zingela (South Africa)	Pavel Pachta (Czechia)	Amb. David T. Johnson (US)
2024	Mark Colhoun (South Africa)	Jallal Toufiq	Galina A. Korchagina (Russia)	Jagjit Pavadia (India)	N. Larissa Razanadimby (Madagascar)	Lin Lu (China)	Sevil Atasoy (Turkey)	Jallal Toufiq (Morocco)	Pierre Lapaque (France)	Cornelis P. de Joncheere (Netherlands)	Mariângela Batista Galvão Simão (Brazil)	Cesar T. Arce Rivas (Paraguay)	Prof. Zukiswa Zingela (South Africa)	Pavel Pachta (Czechia)	Amb. David T. Johnson (US)
2025	Mark Colhoun (South Africa)	Jallal Toufiq	Galina A. Korchagina (Russia)	Jagjit Pavadia (India)	N. Larissa Razanadimby (Madagascar)	Lin Lu (China)	Sevil Atasoy (Turkey)	Jallal Toufiq (Morocco)	Pierre Lapaque (France)	Cornelis P. de Joncheere (Netherlands)	Sawitri Assanangkornchai (Thailand)	Cesar T. Arce Rivas (Paraguay)	Prof. Zukiswa Zingela (South Africa)	Vacant	Amb. David T. Johnson (US)
2025	Mark Colhoun (South Africa)	Sevil Atasoy	Galina A. Korchagina (Russia)	Jagjit Pavadia (India)	N. Larissa Razanadimby (Madagascar)	Lin Lu (China)	Sevil Atasoy (Turkey)	Jallal Toufiq (Morocco)	Pierre Lapaque (France)	Cornelis P. de Joncheere (Netherlands)	Sawitri Assanangkornchai (Thailand)	Cesar T. Arce Rivas (Paraguay)	Prof. Zukiswa Zingela (South Africa)	Vacant	Amb. David T. Johnson (US)

== Global Projects ==
=== International Import and Export Authorization System (I2ES) ===
The International Import and Export Authorization System (I2ES) is an international import and export authorization system that uses an online platform developed in 2015 by the International Narcotic Control Board (INCB) with the support of the United Nations Office on Drugs and Crime (UNODC). I2ES is an online platform developed to facilitate and speed up the process of issuing import and export authorizations for narcotic drugs and psychotropic substances by competent national authorities (CNAs) of importing and exporting countries in compliance with the international drug control treaties. I2ES will allow CNAs to verify the authenticity of such authorizations and to issue endorsements of export authorizations in a secure way and in real time.

=== INCB Learning ===
Launched in 2016, INCB Learning is one of the Board's initiatives to assist Member States in implementing the recommendations of the UNGASS outcome document and the INCB Availability Report (2015). INCB Learning addresses the barriers to adequate availability of indispensable narcotic and psychotropic substances required for medical treatments, particularly by raising awareness and providing training.

=== Global OPIOIDS Project ===
The Board recognized early on that the alarming increase in overdose deaths from non-medical synthetic opioids threatened to become a global challenge. In response, the Board initiated its global Operational Partnerships to Interdict Opioids' Illicit Distribution and Sales (OPIOIDS) Project. The OPIOIDS Project is the only current international effort solely dedicated to developing partnerships with governments, international agencies and the private sector to share information and intelligence with the goal of identifying and interdicting illicit manufacturers, distributors and vendors of synthetic opioids.

The OPIOIDS Project supports national authorities and international organizations' efforts in preventing nonmedical synthetic opioids and fentanyl-related substances from reaching people, by:

- Developing international agency and industry partnerships with those who have a practical role to play in responding to the crisis;
- Increasing awareness regarding the nature and scale of synthetic opioids and fentanyl-related substances problem;
- Supporting international initiatives that enhance information-sharing and facilitate co-operation for detection and communication of trafficking;
- Promoting technical assistance and training programmes that ensure safety and security.

=== Project ION - International Operations on New Psychoactive Substances (NPS) ===
Project ION (International Operations on NPS) is the operational initiative of INCB, supporting national authorities' efforts in preventing non-scheduled new psychoactive substances (NPS) of abuse from reaching consumer markets.

Project ION activities are primarily engaged in the coordination, collection and communication of strategic and operational information related to suspicious shipments of, trafficking in, or manufacture or production of NPS. A specific focus is on synthetic NPS with little or no known medical, scientific or industrial uses and our activities are primarily engaged in the coordination, collection and communication of strategic and operational information.

=== Public-Private Partnerships ===
In recent years, voluntary public-private partnerships have come to play an increasingly important role in global precursor control. In this context, the concept aims at preventing the diversion of chemicals for illicit purposes, through cooperation between national authorities and the private sector. INCB has further expanded its public-private partnerships to include legitimate e-commerce and B2B operators, marketing and social media, online financial service providers, and express mail and courier services. These voluntary partnerships supplement the obligatory controls prescribed by the 1988 Convention against Illicit Traffic.

== Controversies ==
=== Lack of "quasi-judicial" powers ===
The INCB routinely defines itself as a "quasi-judicial" body. The position that the INCB is not a "quasi-judicial" body had been defended by governments, civil society organisations, and scholars for a number of years.

=== INCB criticism of domestic policy reforms ===
The Board routinely draws the attention of the international community to interesting drug control developments. However, the INCB has been criticised for their behaviour in urging sovereign states to stay in bounds of the conventions, on the grounds that it may not be within INCB's mandate to comment on matters that are the sole purview of national governments. The move to a more political role combined with a very rigid interpretation of the drug control conventions, passing judgement on states, is considered problematic.

In April 2003, former UNODC Chief of Demand Reduction Cindy Fazey penned a scathing review of the Board, accusing it of overstepping its bounds:

Unfortunately these individuals also see their role not only as the guardians of the conventions, but also the interpreters of them as well. In their annual report they have criticised many governments, such as Canada for permitting the medicinal use of cannabis, Australia for providing injecting rooms and the United Kingdom for proposing to downgrade the classification of cannabis, which would entail less serious penalties than at present. These criticisms go far beyond their remit, and indeed it is hubris to criticise the Canadian Supreme Court.

==== Criticism of UK cannabis rescheduling ====
On the United Kingdom, the report of the Board for 2002 noted "the announcement by the Government of the United Kingdom that cannabis would be placed in a different schedule, requiring less severe controls, and the worldwide repercussions caused by that announcement, including confusion and widespread misunderstanding. A survey undertaken in the United Kingdom found that as many as 94 per cent of children believed that cannabis was a legal substance or even some type of medicine. The survey also discovered that nearly 80 per cent of teachers in the United Kingdom believed that the recent reclassification of cannabis would make educating pupils about the dangers of drug abuse more challenging and difficult. Several opinion polls taken in July and August 2002 found that the majority of the population did not support that reclassification." (Paragraph 499) Parliamentary Under Secretary of State Bob Ainsworth responded:

The comments made in your report, your selective and inaccurate use of statistics, and failure to refer to the scientific basis on which the UK Government's decision was based all add up to an ill-informed and potentially damaging message. This was compounded by the way in which the Board presented the cannabis reclassification decision to the media at the launch of its annual report on 26 February. For example, the Board representative is quoted as having said that we might end up in the next 10 or 20 years with our psychiatric hospitals filled with people who have problems with cannabis, and that a recent study by the British Lung Foundation found smoking three cannabis joints caused the same damage to the linings of the airways as 20 cigarettes. These are totally misleading statements.

In 2008, the Home Secretary of the United Kingdom recommended that cannabis be reclassified as a class B drug.

==== Position on personal cultivation of cannabis ====
In 2005, in the wake of the United States Supreme Court's decision in Gonzales v. Raich, the Board welcomed "the decision of the United States Supreme Court, made on 6 June, reaffirming that the cultivation and use of cannabis, even if it is for 'medical' use, should be prohibited." The Board's president, Hamid Ghodse, opined:

INCB has for many years pointed out that the evidence that cannabis might be useful as a medicine is insufficient. Countries should not authorise the use of cannabis as a medicine until conclusive results based on research are available. Sound scientific evidence for its safety, efficacy and usefulness is required to justify its use in medical practice. Any research into cannabis as a medicine should involve the World Health Organization, as the responsible international health agency.

INCB's rejection of the right to cultivate cannabis for personal purposes has been deemed to lack substantial justification.

In 2020, the INCB launched a "Cannabis Control Initiative" which was also criticized for failing to acknowledge the tension between its approach to cannabis control and the right to privacy, recognized in international human rights law and by the Constitutional Courts of a number of countries""

==== Criticism of the legalization of cannabis in Uruguay and Canada ====
In 2013, then-President of the Board Raymond Yans reportedly labeled Uruguay as a "pirate country" because of its decision to regulate cannabis for recreational purposes. Similar criticism was expressed when Canada followed suit in 2018.

In 2019, a month after the World Health Organization recommended to lower the scheduling status of cannabis and cannabis resin, the INCB reiterated its interpretation that laws and policies allowing for the recreational use of cannabis are "contrary to the international drug control treaties."

=== Access and availability of controlled drugs for medical use ===
The INCB has published several special reports on the availability of opiates for medical needs, going back to 1989 and 1995 and has repeatedly called for urgent global action to address the situation. In its 2008 report, noting that millions of people around the world are suffering from acute and chronic pain, the INCB calls on governments to support a new programme of the World Health Organization (WHO), which aims at improving access to those medicines. But a number of civil society stakeholders, such as the Senlis Council, has argued that the INCB is not taking seriously its responsibility vis-à-vis the global needs for medicines:

The INCB is responsible for ensuring adequate supplies of drugs for medical use. Currently millions of people are suffering due to a mounting global shortage of opium-based painkillers such as morphine and codeine, especially in the developing world. The methods used by the INCB to calculate the amounts needed of these medicines are flawed and need to be reconsidered.

A 2020 research found that "for fifty years, the INCB has focussed predominantly upon [...] illicit uses, with little attention to [...] therapeutic Uses. Decreasing attention is provided to the estimates of annual requirements system, under which global opioid access to opioids is documented as inadequate."

=== Human rights and transparency ===
In 2019, observers noted that in "recent years have seen the Board, through its annual report, become progressively more engaged with the issue of human rights." But issues remain open. In December 2021, a group of 181 non-governmental organizations wrote to the Secretary-General of the United Nations to express concerns about the need for human rights due diligence in the work of the Board related to cannabis.

==== Opacity of the proceedings ====
Many observers and stakeholders have criticized the lack of transparency, accountability, and mechanisms for participation in INCB work, contrary to other United Nations system entities. In 2010, a report of the London School of Economics noted, "INCB remains perhaps the most closed and least transparent of any entity supported by the United Nations. There are no minutes or public reports on the deliberations of the INCB. The INCB's proceedings are closed not only to NGOs but also to member states."

The report noted the United Nations Security Council had transparency, accountability and participation mechanisms that are more open than those of the INCB.

Observers noted that as of December 2021, the situation had not improved.

== See also ==
- 1961 Single Convention on Narcotic Drugs – 1971 Convention on Psychotropic Substances – 1988 UN Convention Against Illicit Traffic
- Drug policy – Prohibition of drugs
- Treaty body – International law
- Cannabis and international law – Removal of cannabis and cannabis resin from Schedule IV of the 1961 Single Convention
- United Nations Office on Drugs and Crime – World Health Organization – ECOSOC – Commission on Narcotic Drugs
