= Sevil Atasoy =

Turkish scientist

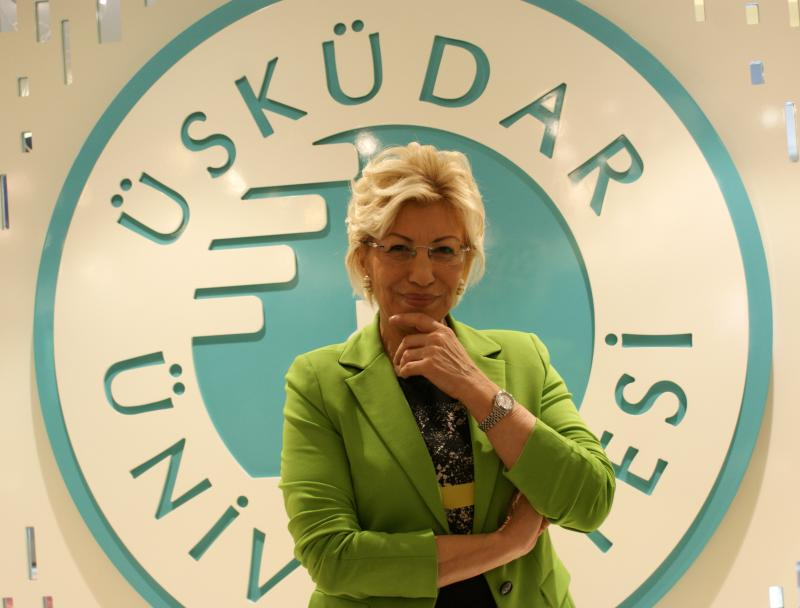
- Born: Hafize Hikmet Sevil Gök; February 25, 1949 (age 76); Istanbul, Turkey
- Education: Deutsche Schule Istanbul; Istanbul University
- Medical career
- Profession: Forensic Medicine
- Institutions: Institute of Forensic Science, Istanbul University; Üsküdar University
- Awards: İsmail Cem Award

Sevil Atasoy (born February 25, 1949) is a Turkish internationally distinguished leader in the field of Forensic Sciences, substance abuse and addiction. Atasoy is the daughter of forensic pathologist Prof. Dr. Şemsi Gök (1921–2002) and bacteriologist Dr. Ferda Gök (1924–2003). She is currently the executive director of the Innocence Project (Turkey), the International Forensic Science Services, Vice-Rector of Üsküdar University, Istanbul, chairs the Crime & Violence Prevention Center.

She serves as a member at the Inter-ministerial Commission for Drug Prevention, represented several times Turkey at international meetings including the United Nations Commission on Narcotic Drugs. Internationally, she is also a former chair of the International Narcotics Control Board (in 2009).

Sevil Atasoy has a TV show on the TV2 network, titled Kanıt (Evidence), which premiered on Kanal D, a national TV network, in July 2010. The show was created and produced by Abdullah Oğuz. The series follows Istanbul criminalists as they use physical evidence to solve murders, based on true crime cases, written by Sevil Atasoy's daughter Ayça Selin Atasoy.
