= Jonathan Lucas =

Director of the United Nations Interregional Crime and Justice Research Institute
- Incumbent
- Assumed office May, 2011
- Secretary-General: Ban Ki-moon
- Preceded by: Sandro Calvani
- Succeeded by: Cindy Smith ^{ad interim}

28th Chief of the Secretariat and Secretary, International Narcotics Control Board
- In office March 22, 2010 – May, 2011
- Preceded by: Koli Kouame
- Succeeded by: Andrés Finguerut

Personal details
- Education: Graduate Institute of International Studies; Acadia University

Jonathan Lucas was a former United Nations civil servant. He was appointed Secretary of the International Narcotics Control Board (INCB) in 2010 in replacement of Koli Kouame.

== Career ==
Lucas holds a doctoral degree in International Law/Economics from the Graduate Institute of International Studies (Geneva, Switzerland) and a master's degree in Political Science from Acadia University (Wolfville, Canada).

He started his professional career in 1982 as Consultant with the International Labour Organization (ILO) in Switzerland, and subsequently joined the United Nations in 1984 as Associate Social Affairs Officer.

Throughout his career, Dr. Lucas served in various capacities, including as Legal and First Officer for the policy-making organs of the United Nations International Drug Control Programme (now UNODC) and as Senior Programme Management Officer with the Office of the Executive Director/Director-General of the then United Nations Office on Drug Control and Crime Prevention (ODCCP)/United Nations Office at Vienna (UNOV).

From 1998 to 2004, Dr. Lucas served as Secretary of both United Nations' Commission on Narcotic Drugs (CND) and Commission on Crime Prevention and Criminal Justice (CCPCJ).

Prior to his appointment as Secretary of the INCB, Dr. Lucas served as Regional Representative of the United Nations Office on Drugs and Crime (UNODC), Southern Africa, based in Pretoria.

Lucas was by UN Secretary-General Ban Ki-moon on 22 March 2010 as the Secretary of the International Narcotics Control Board and Chief of the International Narcotics Control Board Secretariat.

Lucas became Director of the United Nations Interregional Crime and Justice Research Institute (UNICRI) in May 2011, leaving his position open to being replaced by Andrés Finguerut in 2010.

He remained Director of UNICRI until 2015. Upon leave, the Secretary-General Ban Ki-moon praised "Mr. Lucas’ exemplary leadership in the implementation of the Institute’s mandate during a very challenging period"

Diplomatic posts
Preceded by Koli Kouame	Secretary of the International Narcotics Control Board; 22 March 2010 - 2011	Succeeded by Andrés Finguerut
