= François Loncle =

French politician

Member of the National Assembly for Eure's 4th constituency
- In office 1997–2017
- Preceded by: Bernard Leroy
- Succeeded by: Bruno Questel

Secretary of State for Planning
- In office 4 June 1992 – 29 March 1993
- President: François Mitterrand
- Prime Minister: Pierre Bérégovoy
- Succeeded by: Jean Arthuis

Personal details
- Born: 21 October 1941 (age 84) Enghien-les-Bains, France
- Party: Socialist Party
- Education: Paris Law Faculty; Centre de formation des journalistes

François Loncle (born October 21, 1941) is a French politician. He represented the 4th constituency of the Eure department in the National Assembly of France from 1997 to 2017 as a member of the Socialist Party.

== Biography ==
Loncle was born October 21, 1941, in Enghien-les-Bains (France). He was a student at the Paris Law Faculty and graduated from Centre de formation des journalistes in 1963.

He is married and father of three children.

He started out as a journalist the Paris Normandie. In 1964 he served at the Office de Radiodiffusion Télévision Française where he hosted a program of exchange (la Bourse), he reported later of Service economy of news broadcasts «20 heures» and participated in news broadcasts «Panorama». In July 1968 consequently of strike he was discharged with 120 others journalists by order of government Georges Pompidou. At the end of 1969 he was employed by Eugène Descamps as a presse officer of the CFDT that he located to 1970.

In 1971 he founded a study and action radical-socialist group with some members of the Radical Party. This became the Radical Party of the Left. He served as National Secretary until 1981.

Supported by Pierre Mendès France he was elected a deputy to the department of Eure a fourth election district on 21 June 1981. After this election he joins the Socialist Party. He was re-elected a deputy in 1986 and 1988. Beaten during a historical defeat of the left in 1993, he was re-elected again in 1997 following a dissolution of the National Assembly settled by President of France Jacques Chirac, re-elected again in 2002, 2007 and 2012.

In 1992 he was appointed Secretary of State in the Bérégovoy's Government.

From 1997 he became a member of the Foreign Affairs Committee, the National Assembly so he served as chairman between 5 April 2000 and 18 June 2002.

Until 2017 he was president of the friendship group Burkina Faso, vice-president of the friendships groups Serbia, Estonia, Costa Rica, New Zealand, Mauritania, Uganda and Syria, secretary of the friendship group France-Mali, vice-president of the study group of international vocation of issues related to the economic expansion in Taiwan, member of the study group of the Tibet question; from 2011 he is a speaker of the working group of Sahel Security, member of the investigation committee about supervision of jihadists communications and of the Mission of information about Libya in the National Assembly.

He was vice-president of a French delegation of the Parliamentary Assembly of the Council of Europe.

== Position statement ==
In 2010 he supported Laurent Gbagbo and contested the victory of his rival Alassane Ouattara in Ivory Coast.

On 17 March 2016 with 19 others socialist deputies he gave an option for withdrawal of amendment, supported by the government, interdicting the fishing at the depth of more than 800 metres.

He favoured Emmanuel Macron for the presidential election 2017.

He supported Bruno Questel for the legislative election 2017

== Political mandates ==
=== Former governmental functions ===
- 4 Juin 1992 - 26 December 1992: Minister of City Affairs
- 26 December 1992 - 29 March 1993: Minister of Planning

=== Parliamentary mandates ===
- 21 Juin 1981 - 1 April 1986: Deputy of Eure
- 12 Juin 1988 - 3 July 1992: Deputy of Eure

(Nomination in Government)

- 1 Juin 1997 - 18 Juin 2002: Deputy of Eure
- From 2002: Deputy of Eure

=== Former local mandates ===
- 14 Juin 1982 - 19 March 1989: Mayor of Brionne (Eure)
- 3 October 1988 - 26 May 1989: General councillor of Eure
- 22 March 1989 - 18 Juin 1995: Mayor of Brionne (Eure)
- 19 Juin 1995 - 18 March 2001: Assistant Mayor of Louviers (Eure)
- 2001 - 2008: Municipal councillor of Louviers (Eure)
- Community councillor of Agglomeration communities the Seine-Eure

== The laureate of Political humor Grand Prix ==
In 2011 the jury of Political humor Grand Prix awarded to him the diploma of special merit as deputy champion of written questions to government remains unanswered but published in the Official Journal. He was awarded in 2005 by the same jury for saying the former Prime minister Dominique Galouzeau de Villepin: «He has the name of the horse but he has never raced», referring to the fact that the latter never presented to least election.
