= Koli Kouame =

Former United Nations drug control civil servant

27th Chief of the Secretariat and Secretary, International Narcotics Control Board
- In office September 6, 2004 – March 22, 2010
- Preceded by: Herbert Schaepe

Personal details
- Education: University of Côte d’Ivoire; University of Wisconsin

Koli Kouame is a former United Nations civil servant from Côte d’Ivoire. He notably served as the Secretary of the International Narcotics Control Board (INCB) between 2004 and 2010. In this position, Mr. Kouame was in charge of the permanent staff in at the INCB in Vienna (Austria) working on the international drug control treaties.

== Career ==
Kouame holds a Ph.D. in Philosophy from the University of Wisconsin, USA, as well as a master's degree in Applied Social Sciences from the University of Côte d’Ivoire. He is fluent in English, French and several African languages. He is married and has four children.

A veteran staff member of the United Nations, who joined the organization in September 1982 as an Associate Social Affairs Officer, Mr. Kouame worked in all the technical units of the Secretariat of the INCB, rising through the ranks to become Chief of the Narcotics Control Unit in 1992. As Chief of the Narcotics Control Unit, Mr. Kouame worked towards maintaining a balance between the licit supply of and demand for opiate raw materials for medical and scientific needs and was instrumental in initiating informal meetings of the Board with the main States importing and producing opiate raw materials.

Mr. Kouame served as regional director of the United Nations Office on Drugs and Crime (UNODC) in India (1995–1997), regional representative in Kenya (1997–1999) before joining peacekeeping missions (United Nations Transition Assistance Group in Namibia, 1989–1990; United Nations Observer Group for the Verification of Elections in Haiti, in 1990). Throughout these demanding assignments in the field, he continued to support the work of the Board. Mr. Kouame then served as Chief of the Africa and the Middle East Section, Partnership in Development Branch, Division for Operations of the UNODC.

He was then appointed as INCB Secretary on 6 September 2004 by UN Secretary-General Kofi Annan.

Diplomatic posts
Preceded by Herbert Schaepe	Chief of the Secretariat and Secretary, International Narcotics Control Board; 4 September 2004- 22 March 2010	Succeeded by Jonathan Lucas
