= Treaty body =

Internationally established body of independent experts

In international law, a treaty body (or treaty-based body) is an internationally established body of independent experts that monitors how States party to a particular international legal instrument are implementing their obligations under it.

== Definitions ==
The International Law Commission defines an "expert treaty body" as:

"a body consisting of experts serving in their personal capacity, which is established under a treaty and is not an organ of an international organization."

A research guide published by the UN library lists key characteristics of human rights treaty-based bodies:

- They "derive their existence from provisions contained in a specific legal instrument",
- They hold more narrow mandates, being often limited to the set of powers codified in the treaty establishing them,
- The audiences that treaty bodies address are limited to countries having ratified the legal instrument (as opposed to UN agencies which enjoy a quasi-universal audience),
- Their decision-making often involves consensus.

Notably, the experts composing treaty bodies usually serve in their personal capacity (i.e., not representing their country). Treaty bodies are distinct from "international organizations" as such, like United Nations agencies, programs, or other sui generis international organizations.

There are a number of treaty bodies, in particular in relation with international human rights law. However, there are also treaty bodies related to non-human rights instruments such as the UPOV or the INCB. The mandates of treaty bodies is generally defined in the treaty that establishes them, and sometimes by General Assembly decisions or resolutions. Treaty bodies sometimes perform additional functions than the sole monitoring of treaty compliance.

== List of treaty bodies ==
List of treaty bodies (non-exhaustive)
Treaty body	Treaty	Date of creation	Headquarter
Committee Against Torture	United Nations Convention against Torture	1987	Geneva
Human Rights Committee (CCPR)	International Covenant on Civil and Political Rights	1977	Geneva
International Narcotics Control Board (INCB)	1961 Single Convention on Narcotic Drugs	1968	Vienna
International Narcotics Control Board (INCB)	1971 Convention on Psychotropic Substances	1968	Vienna
International Narcotics Control Board (INCB)	1988 Convention Against Illicit Traffic in Narcotic Drugs and Psychotropic Substances	1968	Vienna
International Whaling Commission (IWC)	International Convention for the Regulation of Whaling	1946	Impington
Secretariat of the Convention on Biological Diversity	Convention on Biological Diversity	1992	Montreal
Secretariat of the Convention on Biological Diversity	Cartagena Protocol on Biosafety	1992	Montreal
Secretariat of the Convention on Biological Diversity	Nagoya Protocol on Fair Access and Benefit-Sharing	1992	Montreal
International Union for the Protection of New Varieties of Plants (UPOV)	International Convention for the Protection of New Varieties of Plants	1968	Geneva
International Seabed Authority (ISA)	United Nations Convention on the Law of the Sea	1994	Kingston

== See also ==
- International law
- United Nations
- Human rights treaty bodies
