= Eure's 4th constituency =

Constituency of the National Assembly of France

4th constituency of Eure
- inline Constituency of the National Assembly of France

- Constituency in department

- Location of Eure in France
- Deputy: Philippe Brun; PS
- Department: Eure

The 4th constituency of Eure is a French legislative constituency in the Eure département. It consists of the cantons of Bourgtheroulde-Infreville, Gaillon, Louviers and Val-de-Reuil.

== Deputies ==
Election	Member	Party
1958	René Tomasini	UNR
1962	René Tomasini	UNR
1967	René Tomasini	UDR
1968	René Tomasini	UDR
1973	René Tomasini	UDR
1978	René Tomasini	RPR
1981	Jacques Tailleur	RPR
1981	Freddy Deschaux-Beaume	PS
1986	Proportional representation - no election by constituency	
1988	François Loncle	PS
1993	Bernard Leroy	UDF
1997	François Loncle	PS
2002	François Loncle	PS
2007	François Loncle	PS
2012	François Loncle	PS
2017	Bruno Questel	LREM
2022	Philippe Brun	PS
2024	Philippe Brun	PS

== Election results ==
=== 2024 ===
Candidate	Party	Alliance	First round			Second round		
Candidate	Party	Alliance	Votes	%	+/–	Votes	%	+/–
Patrice Pauper	RN		25,691	41.64	+12.67	28,495	47.17	-2.38
Philippe Brun	PS	NFP	21,144	34.27	+8.49	31,914	52.83	+2.38
Anne Terlez	MoDEM	Ensemble	10,767	17.45	-7.22			
Olivier Istin	DVD		2,868	4.65	new			
Christophe Solal	LO		693	1.12	-0.18			
Stacy Blondel	REC		536	0.87	-2.66			
Votes			61,698	100.00		60,409	100.00	
Valid votes			61,698	97.76	+0.45	60,409	95.01	+5.94
Blank votes			1,065	1.69	-0.13	2,516	3.96	-4.98
Null votes			349	0.55	-1.27	654	1.03	-0.97
Turnout			63,112	67.50	+19.24	63,579	68.01	+20.36
Abstentions			30,390	32.50	-19.24	29,909	31.99	-20.36
Registered voters			93,502			93,488		
Result			PS HOLD					

=== 2022 ===
Legislative Election 2022: Eure's 4th constituency
Party	Candidate	Votes	%	±%
RN	Chrystelle Sauliere	12,598	28.97	+7.41
PS (NUPÉS)	Philippe Brun	12,078	27.78	+2.17
LREM (Ensemble)	Bruno Questel	10,727	24.67	−8.63
LR (UDC)	Marie-Dominique Perchet	3,104	7.14	−6.76
REC	William Bertrand	1,533	3.53	N/A
DIV	Nadjia Djemel	924	2.13	N/A
PA	Sylvain Thomas	869	2.00	N/A
Others	N/A	1,648	3.79	
Turnout		43,481	48.26	−0.48
2nd round result
PS (NUPÉS)	Philippe Brun	19,825	50.45	N/A
RN	Chrystelle Sauliere	19,475	49.55	+10.06
Turnout		39,300	47.65	+4.79
PS gain from LREM				

=== 2017 ===
Candidate	Label	First round		Second round	
Candidate	Label	Votes	%	Votes	%
Bruno Questel	REM	14,238	33.30	20,755	60.51
Doris Perreaux	FN	9,219	21.56	13,543	39.49
Arnaud Levitre	FI	6,113	14.30		
François-Xavier Priollaud	UDI	5,943	13.90		
Richard Jacquet	PS	2,993	7.00		
Alexis Fraisse	ECO	1,842	4.31		
Carole Deboos	DLF	918	2.15		
Christophe Solal	EXG	442	1.03		
Jean-Thomas Baudouin	DIV	414	0.97		
David Desfresne	DIV	293	0.69		
Nelly Abergel	DVG	223	0.52		
François-Marie Peloffy	DIV	118	0.28		
Votes		42,756	100.00	34,298	100.00
Valid votes		42,756	97.54	34,298	88.98
Blank votes		823	1.88	3,225	8.37
Null votes		257	0.59	1,024	2.66
Turnout		43,836	48.74	38,547	42.86
Abstentions		46,104	51.26	51,393	57.14
Registered voters		89,940		89,940	
Source: Ministry of the Interior

=== 2012 ===
2012 legislative election in Eure's 4th constituency
Candidate	Party	First round		Second round	
Candidate	Party	Votes	%	Votes	%
François Loncle	PS	19,526	39.80%	26,209	57.05%
François-Xavier Priollaud	NC	12,764	26.02%	19,730	42.95%
Julie Barbier	FN	9,212	18.78%		
Arnaud Levitre	FG	3,616	7.37%		
Laetitia Sanchez	EELV	1,531	3.12%		
Anne Terlez	MoDem	1,292	2.63%		
Sophie Ozanne	NPA	504	1.03%		
Marie-Josée Danelli	DLR	360	0.73%		
Christophe Solal	LO	253	0.52%		
Valid votes		49,058	98.60%	45,939	95.87%
Spoilt and null votes		699	1.40%	1,978	4.13%
Votes cast / turnout		49,757	57.36%	47,917	55.26%
Abstentions		36,992	42.64%	38,788	44.74%
Registered voters		86,749	100.00%	86,705	100.00%
