= Horizontal Working Party on Drugs =

Body of the Council of the European Union

The Horizontal Working Party on Drugs (better known as Horizontal Drug Group or HDG) is a Council Working Party, a preparatory body of the Council of the European Union established in 1997, responsible for the lead and management of the work of the council and of the European Union (EU) on drug policy.

The HDG meets monthly in Brussels's Europa building or in the Justus Lipsius building, and prepares all relevant legislation and political documents to be adopted by EU's Committee of Permanent Representatives (COREPER II) and subsequently by the Council, such as EU drugs strategies, action plans on drugs, and statements on drug-related aspects to be presented at international fora like the United Nations Commission on Narcotic Drugs. Since 2018, the HDG is also responsible to establish the imperative mandate for the vote on international scheduling by member state of the EU at the Commission on Narcotic Drugs.

The HDG engages and closely collaborates with other EU institutions like the European Monitoring Centre for Drugs and Drug Addiction and Europol.

There are frequent meetings of EU countries' national drugs coordinators held as part of HDG meetings. In addition, the HDG regularly meets with delegates from other regions and third countries within the EU's area of interest (Russia, Turkey, the Western Balkans, the United States within a so-called "Transatlantic Dialogue", Western Africa, Andes Community, and with countries from Latin America and the Caribbean within the "Technical Committee EU/LAC").
