= Mark Colhoun =

South African civil servant

Secretary, INCB
- In office 2021–2025
- Preceded by: Andrés Finguerut (Stefano Berterame ad'interim)

Personal details
- Born: South Africa
- Education: analytical chemistry, security studies

Mark Colhoun is a South African police officer and international civil servant specialised in precursor chemicals. He was formerly Secretary of the International Narcotics Control Board (INCB).

== Education and Career ==
Colhoun studied analytical chemistry and graduated in security studies. He then joined the South African Police Service for 17 years as part of the South African Narcotics Bureau (formed in 1974) where he worked already on illicit international markets and precursors of synthetic drugs.

He was advisor in the precursors section of the INCB from 1999 to 2007, then law enforcement adviser at the United Nations Office on Drugs and Crime (UNODC) Central Asia Office in Tashkent (Uzbekistan) from 2007 to 2010.

Colhoun was subsequently the UNODC's country deputy representative, then main representative in Kabul (Afghanistan), from 2010 to 2021, before his nomination "as Secretary of the International Narcotics Control Board (INCB) and Chief of the INCB Secretariat effective 1 March 2021."

Diplomatic posts
Preceded by Andrés Finguerut (Stefano Berterame ad'interim)	Secretary, International Narcotics Control Board; 2021–2025	Succeeded by Stefano Berterame (ad'interim)
Preceded by	Country Representative, UNODC country office in Afghanistan; 2010–2021	Succeeded by
