= Hamid Ghodse =

Iranian-British psychiatrist

Abdol Hamid Ghodse CBE
- Born: 30 April 1938; Iran
- Died: 27 December 2012 (aged 74); Kingston, Surrey, England, UK
- Occupations: Professor of psychiatry and of international drug policy, University of London
- Website: incb.org/incb/en/about/members/hamid_ghodse.html

Abdol Hamid Ghodse CBE (Persian: حمید قدس; 30 April 1938 – 27 December 2012) was an academic in the field of substance abuse and addiction.

== Career ==
=== Positions held at time of death ===
- Professor of Psychiatry and of International Drug Policy, University of London (from 1987)
- President of European Collaborating Centres for Addiction Studies (from 1992)
- Member of the International Narcotics Control Board (from 1992)
- Member of the Executive Committee of the Federation of Clinical Professors (from 1994)
- Director of the Board of International Affairs and Member of the Council, Royal College of Psychiatrists (from 2000)
- Member of the Scientific Committee on Tobacco and Health (from 2000)
- Non-executive director of the National Patient Safety Agency (from 2001)
- Director of the International Centre for Drug Policy, St George's, University of London (since 2003)
- Chairman of Higher Degrees in Psychiatry, University of London (since 2003)
- Member of the Medical Studies Committee, University of London (since 2003)

=== Former positions ===
- President of the International Narcotics Control Board (1993, 1994, 1997, 1998, 2000, 2001, 2004, 2005, 2008, 2010, 2011)
- Medical Director of the National Clinical Excellence Awards (2006)

== Degrees and qualifications ==
Doctor of Medicine (MD), Iran (1965); Diploma Psychological Medicine (DPM), United Kingdom of Great Britain and Northern Ireland (1974); Doctor of Philosophy (PhD), University of London (1976); Fellow of the Royal College of Psychiatrists (FRCPsych), United Kingdom (1985); Fellow of the Royal College of Physicians (FRCP), London (1992); Fellow of the Royal College of Physicians of Edinburgh (FRCPE), Edinburgh (1997); Fellow of the Faculty of Public Health Medicine (FFPHM), United Kingdom (1997); Doctor of Science (DSc), University of London (2002); Fellow of the Higher Education Academy (FHEA), United Kingdom (2005).

== Research and policy development ==
Professor Ghodse conducted research over 40 years in the areas of substance misuse and addictions. His early research, which formed the basis of his PhD thesis, was biological and focussed on the endocrinological effects of opioids on cortisol, growth hormone and insulin. He also systematically investigated the effect of naloxone on the pupil and developed this research into an accurate, non-invasive test for opioid dependence, which uniquely permits the rapid differentiation of opiate dependence from non-dependent use in an outpatient setting; international patents have been taken out for both the Ghodse Opioid Addiction Test (GOAT) and the pupilometer components of the test, which was selected as one of the 1000 UK Millennium Products.

Another important area of research was the development of epidemiological methods of studying the extent and nature of drug-related problems and the evaluation of the reliability and validity of various indicators. These included major surveys of accident and emergency departments and long term studies of coroners' courts and of the Home Office Index of Addict Deaths. Continuation of this 30-year-long research on mortality led to the development of a unique national database including the establishment of the National Programme on Substance Abuse Deaths (NPSAD). An understanding of the "natural history" of addiction is fundamental to understanding the condition and to evaluating the effect of different treatments. Professor Ghodse's follow-up studies of cohorts of addicts therefore made a significant contribution to knowledge in this area. He also carried out systematic evaluation of different pharmacological treatments as well as the settings in which treatment takes place.

The epidemiological methods that he pioneered were selected by WHO for international studies and his studies have contributed significantly to international policy formation. His investigations on the role of different healthcare professionals in the rational use of psychoactive drugs were important in the development of WHO guidelines on this subject. He also developed an index for the assessment of rational prescribing which was accepted by WHO as an advancement of drug use research. His multicentre European studies on drugs and mental health and "Treat 2000" are contributing to the understanding of drug-related psychosis and treatment outcome of opioid addictions. He was the lead investigator in a multicentre study on the treatment of tobacco addiction in general and psychiatric hospitals and developed a toolkit for use in these settings.

He established the International Centre for Drug Policy at St George's University of London and over the years attracted substantial funding for research programmes and projects in psychiatry, mental health, addictions and medical education. He was President of the European Collaborating Centres on Addiction Studies (ECCAS).

== Education and training ==
Professor Ghodse was appointed to the first established Chair in Addictive Behaviour in the UK in 1987. He established undergraduate, postgraduate and multi-professional training programmes in addiction, the benefit of which is reflected in the numbers of senior academics, consultant psychiatrists, public health practitioners, specialist nurses, social workers and psychologists leading the delivery of services in communities throughout the United Kingdom and many other parts of the world. A long list of teaching and training programmes which Professor Ghodse helped to establish includes addiction prevention in primary care, and educational courses for general practitioners and for prison service medical and nursing staff. He directed a national programme for the development and implementation of a Corporate Substance Misuse Curriculum in Medical Schools in the UK.

For many years he was Chairman of the subject panel of Psychiatry and Co-ordinator of Higher Degree Examinations of the University of London. He was Chairman of the Association of Professors of Psychiatry in the British Isles.

== International activities ==
Hamid Ghodse was one of the 13 elected members of the International Narcotics Control Board (INCB), an independent treaty body associated with the United Nations Office on Drugs and Crime, from 1992 to his death. He was the first scientist to be the President of the INCB, and was elected to this position for a record ten times. During this time he helped to modernise and lead the Board, gaining the confidence of the public and governments of all nations, as a respected and highly regarded organisation and helping to stem the scourge of narcotic abuse and trafficking. Over the years he tried to bring to the attention of governments the need to ensure adequate access to narcotic analgesics and other internationally controlled drugs for legitimate medical and scientific purposes. He addressed the UN Commission on Narcotic Drugs, ECOSOC, and the World Health Assembly as well as national parliaments and international conferences and was an advocate for debate on controversial drug-related issues. He played an important role in a number of national and international civil societies, organisations and NGOs and was always supportive of their eminent contribution to all aspects of health.

== Other posts and activities ==
Professor Ghodse was Medical Director of the National Advisory Committee on Clinical Excellence Awards (ACCEA) for England and Wales, Chairman of the International Health Advisory Board (IHAB) and the Senior Professional advisor to the Parliamentary and Health Service Ombudsman. He was awarded the highest honour of the Royal College of Psychiatrists, by being elected an Honorary Fellow in 2006, and was made an Honorary Fellow of the World Psychiatric Association (WPA) in 2008 and International Fellow of the American Psychiatric Association (APA). He published over 350 papers, chapters and a number of books, of which those on legal and clinical aspects have become standard works. Some of his other books, "Addiction at Work" (Gower Publishing), "International Drug Control in 21st Century" (Ashgate Publishing), "Ghodse's Drugs and Addictive Behaviour"(4th Edition, Cambridge University Press) and "Substance Abuse Disorders" (Wiley-Blackwell Publication) are other ground-breaking works. He was an Advisor on analgesic and on psychotropic medication (Section 4) to the British National Formulary from 1982. One of his research papers won the SIGP 2004 Prize for best psychopharmacological paper in the British Journal of Psychiatry. In 1999 Ghodse was appointed as an honorary Commander of the Most Excellent Order of the British Empire for his dedication to research and clinical practice.
