= Betty Gough =

American foreign service officer

- Betty Gough, from a 1969 publication
- Born: Betty Catherine Gough; July 18, 1920; Fond du Lac, Wisconsin
- Died: October 24, 2018 (aged 98); Roseville, California
- Occupation: Foreign service officer
- Known for: President of the International Narcotics Control Board

Betty Catherine Gough (July 18, 1920 – October 24, 2018) was an American foreign service officer. She was active in the founding of the United Nations and was the first woman member of the International Narcotics Control Board; she served as the board's president from 1985 to 1986, and in 1990.

== Early life and education ==
Gough (pronounced "Goff") was born in Fond du Lac, Wisconsin, the daughter of James J. Gough and Teresa Virginia Whitstone Gough. Her parents were Roman Catholic; her father was a chiropractor. She trained as a teacher at the Wisconsin Teachers' College (now the University of Wisconsin at Oshkosh), with further studies at George Washington University and Georgetown University.

== Career ==
Gough joined the United States Department of State in 1943, as an international relations expert, studying the organization of what became the United Nations. She was an American delegate and documents officer at the Dumbarton Oaks Conference in 1944, and was present in an official capacity at the San Francisco and London meetings where the United Nations charter was prepared and signed. She advised American delegations to the United Nations on precedent and parliamentary procedure, from 1946 to 1957. She, Harry S. Truman, and John Foster Dulles were the only original participants from the 1945 San Francisco meeting who attended the tenth anniversary conference in San Francisco in 1955.

Gough became a foreign service officer in 1955. She was part of the United States delegation to UNESCO in Paris, an advisor at the International Atomic Energy Agency in Vienna, and Counselor for Narcotic Affairs in Geneva. She was the first woman member of the International Narcotics Control Board; she served as the board' vice-president in 1980, 1981, and 1984, and as the board's president from 1985 to 1986, and in 1990.

Gough received the State Department's Superior Honor Award twice. In 1996, she received the United Nations' Serge Sotiroff Memorial Award.

== Personal life ==
Gough's widowed mother traveled with her for many years, living with her in Washington, Paris, Vienna, and Geneva. After several years with Alzheimer's disease, Gough died in 2018, aged 98 years, in Roseville, California. Her funeral was held at the Cathedral of St. Matthew the Apostle in Washington, D.C.
