= Bruno Questel =

French politician

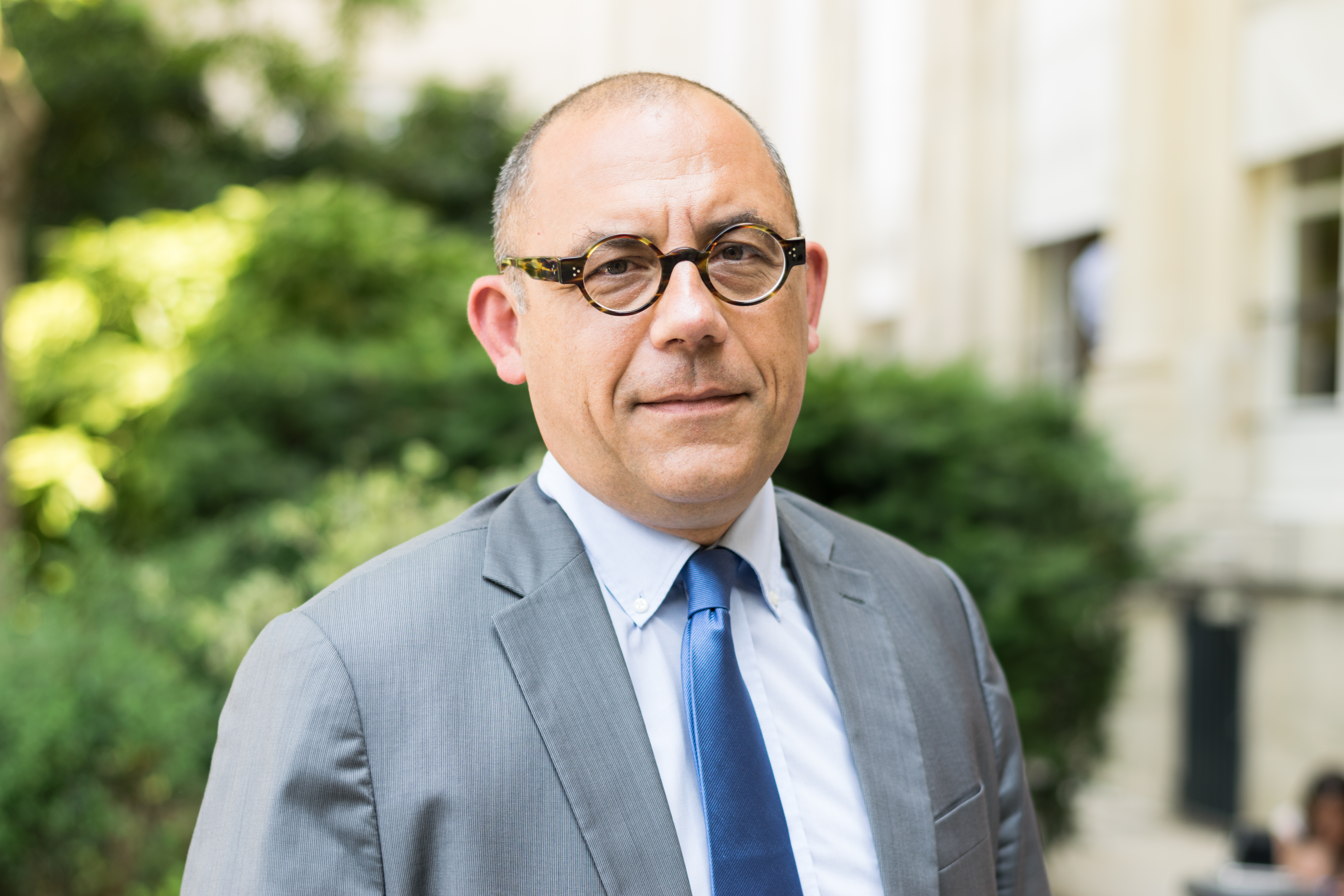

Member of the National Assembly for Eure's 4th constituency
- In office 21 June 2017 – 21 June 2022
- Preceded by: François Loncle
- Succeeded by: Philippe Brun

Personal details
- Born: 21 December 1966 (age 59) Bourg-Achard, France
- Party: La République En Marche!
- Education: Panthéon-Sorbonne University

Bruno Questel (born 21 December 1966) is a French politician of La République En Marche! (LREM) who served as a member of the French National Assembly from 2017 to 2022, representing the department of Eure.

== Political career ==
From 2005 until 2017, Questel was a member of the Socialist Party (PS). In the party's primaries ahead of the 2017 presidential election, he endorsed Arnaud Montebourg; when Benoît Hamon became the party's candidate, Questel left and joined LREM.

In parliament, Questel served on the Committee on Legal Affairs. In this capacity, he was the parliament's rapporteur on a proposal to establish a municipal police in Paris (2019) and (alongside Raphaël Schellenberger) on territorial reforms (2019). In addition to his committee assignments, Questel chaired the French-Kosovar Parliamentary Friendship Group.

In early 2018, Questel was one of several LREM members who joined an informal parliamentary working group on Islam in France set up by Florent Boudié in order to contribute to the government's bill aimed at better organising and supervising the financing of the Muslim faith in France.

From 2018 until 2020, Questel served as one of five deputy chairpersons of the LREM parliamentary group, under the leadership of chairman Gilles Le Gendre.

Questel lost his seat in the first round of the 2022 French legislative election.

== Political positions ==
In July 2019, Questel voted in favour of the French ratification of the European Union’s Comprehensive Economic and Trade Agreement (CETA) with Canada.

== Personal life ==
In December 2018, around 40 protesters of the yellow vests movement fired six shotgun rounds in front of Questel's home, and he received many threatening letters.

In January 2021, Questel revealed that he was the victim of sexual abuse at the age of 11.

== See also ==
- 2017 French legislative election
