= Philippe Brun (politician) =

French politician (born 1991)

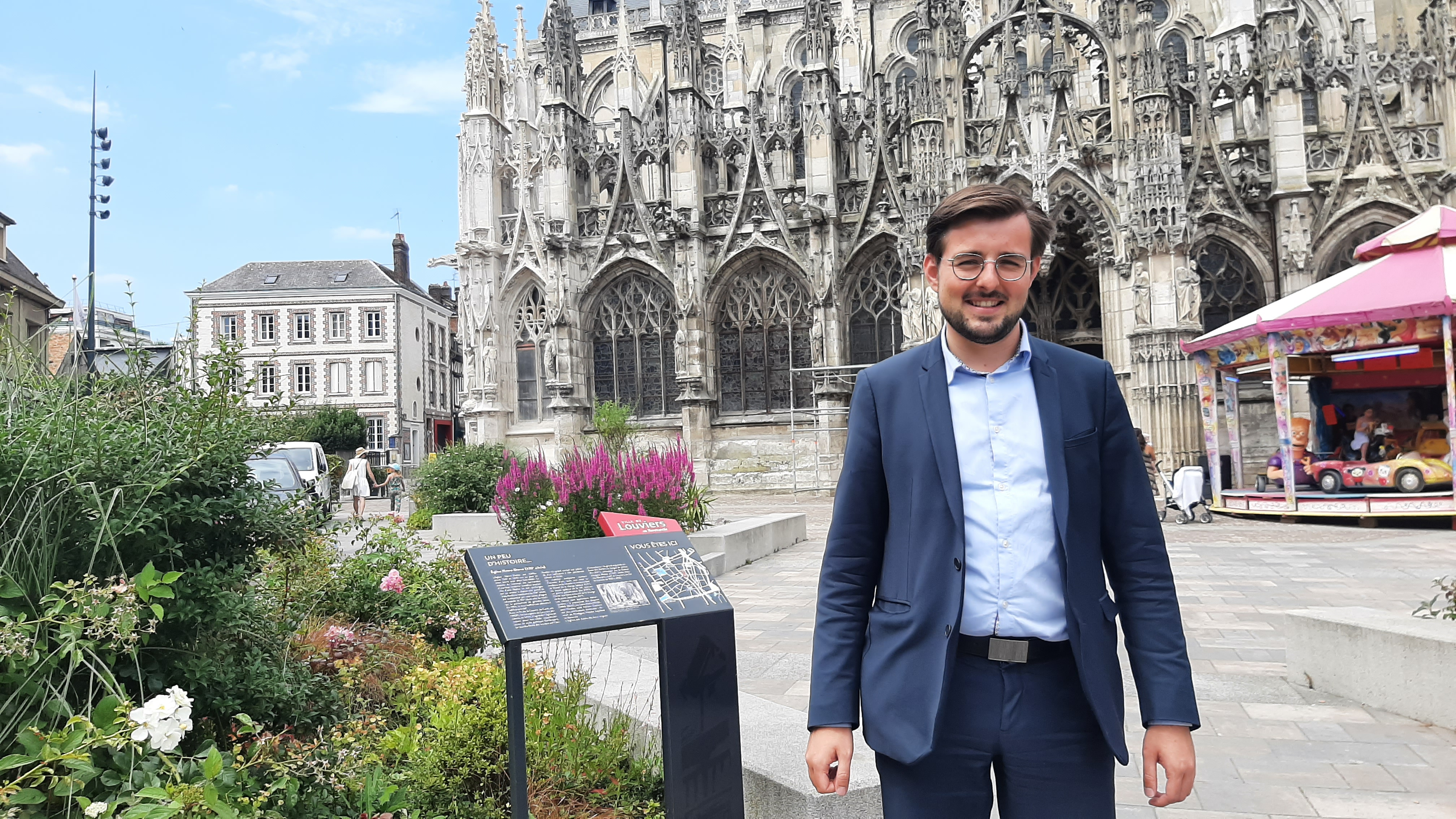
- Philippe Brun in 2022

Member of the National Assembly for the Eure's 4th constituency
- Incumbent
- Assumed office 22 June 2022
- Preceded by: Bruno Questel

Personal details
- Born: 16 October 1991 (age 34) Rouen, France
- Party: Socialist Party (2009–2015; 2022–2026)
- Other political affiliations: New Popular Front; NUPES
- Education: Sciences Po; HEC Paris; ENA

Philippe Brun (born 16 October 1991) is a French politician from the Socialist Party who has represented Eure's 4th constituency in the National Assembly since 2022. He graduated from HEC Paris, Sciences Po and ENA. In 2023, Brun publicly endorsed the re-election of the party's chairman Olivier Faure.

== Biography ==
Between 2012 and 2014, he was a parliamentary assistant to Member of Parliament Axelle Lemaire. He was admitted to the Paris Institute of Political Studies (Sciences Po Paris) in 2009, where he obtained a Master's degree in Public Affairs in 2014, followed by a diploma from HEC Paris in 2016. He was then admitted to the École Nationale d'Administration (ENA), joining the "Georges Clemenceau" cohort (2017-2018). After graduating from the ENA in 2019, he was assigned to the administrative court of Montreuil.

Head of the list alongside Gilet Jaune (Yellow Vest) activist Ingrid Levavasseur in the 2020 municipal elections in Louviers, he obtained 18.23% of the vote and became an opposition city councilor. In 2021, he established the School of Engagement to encourage greater political representation of working-class citizens. He participated in Arnaud Montebourg's 2022 presidential campaign, and after Montebourg's withdrawal, he joined Anne Hidalgo's campaign. On 7 January 2026, he announced his candidacy for mayor of Louviers in the March 2026 municipal elections.

On 30 June 2026, he announced his candidacy for the 2026 French Socialist Party presidential primary. In September 2026, he was disqaulified from competing.

== See also ==
- List of deputies of the 16th National Assembly of France
