= Stefano Berterame =

Chief, Narcotics Control and Estimates Section, INCB
- Incumbent
- Assumed office 2013

Ad'interim Secretary of the International Narcotics Control Board
- In office 2020–2021
- Preceded by: Andrés Finguerut
- Succeeded by: Mark Colhoun

Acting Secretary of the International Narcotics Control Board
- Incumbent
- Assumed office 2025
- Preceded by: Mark Colhoun
- Succeeded by: -

Personal details
- Born: Italy
- Education: Sociology
- Alma mater: University of Manchester

Stefano Berterame is an Italian researcher and international civil servant, chief of the narcotics section of the International Narcotics Control Board (INCB) for more than a decade, and twice the Secretary ad'interim of the institution.

== Education ==
Berterame studied at the University of Manchester, United Kingdom. He reports having worked in public relations at Thales Alenia Space (1980–1986, 1988–1990), and project manager for NGOs. In the 1980s and 1990s, he published about field work in Tanzania, Ethiopia, and Somalia. In the 1990s, he published on topics of migration.

== International Civil Service ==
After a brief passage at UNICEF, he eventually became Associate Social Affaire Adviser at the UN International Drug Control Program Program (later renamed UNODC) in 1992 (a position he occupied until 2013). In the early 2000s he was involved with the HIV program.

=== International Narcotics Control Board ===
In 2013, Berterame was named Chief of the INCB's Narcotics Control and Estimates Section, a position he maintained until 2025. Upon nomination of Andrés Finguerut at the United Nations Office on Drugs and Crime (UNODC) in June 2020, Berterame replaced Fingerut as the INCB Secretary ad'interim, until the naming of Mark Colhoun in March 2021 at that position. In April 2025, Berterame became newly "acting secretary" of the INCB, effectively becoming "officer in charge" of the INCB by 2026.

As INCB Narcotics Chief, Berterame participated in several INCB "country missions" including to Venezuela, Argentina, Russia, Switzerland, Australia, Jamaica, Chile, or Qatar, among others. In 2015, Berterame was part of the controversial mission to Uruguay which goal "was to discuss the legislation on the non-medical use of cannabis and its implementation in Uruguay."

=== Research ===
As part of INCB teams, Berterame has undertaken research focusing on access to opioid medicines for pain management and consumption patterns. His most cited work is a 2016 Lancet study examining opioid analgesic consumption across 214 countries from 2001 to 2013, using INCB data, and documenting significant disparities between high-income regions and other areas. He led INCB's "Project OPIOIDS" (2018).

Diplomatic posts
Preceded by Andrés Finguerut	Secretary, INCB (ad'interim); 2020–2021	Succeeded by Mark Colhoun
Preceded by Mark Colhoun	Secretary, INCB (acting); 2025–present	Succeeded by -
Preceded by ?	Chief, Narcotics section, INCB; 2013–2020; 2021–2025	Succeeded by -
