= Bernard Leroy =

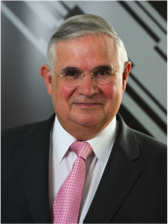

INCB member, 2014–2023

Bernard Louis Fernand Leroy (Pierreville, 26 June 1948 – Paris, 20 February 2023) was a French magistrate and international civil servant.

Trained in law at Caen and at the magistrates’ school in Bordeaux, he began his career as an investigating judge in Évry.

In 1988 he joined the United Nations Office on Drugs and Crime in Vienna, Austria to combat drug trafficking; he later led the UNODC legal assistance program (1990–2010).

Elected to the International Narcotics Control Board in 2014 and again in 2019, he later served as advocate general in Versailles and headed an organization of pharmaceutical companies fighting counterfeit medicines.

Towards the end of his life, he began a dialogue with organisations of people who use cannabis in relation to cannabis legalisation and discussions around Article 2 paragraph 9 of the Single Convention on narcotic drugs.

He died in Paris in 2023 and is buried in Pierreville.

== See also ==
- International Narcotics Control Board
- United Nations Office on Drugs and Crime
- NORML France
