= Cindy Fazey =

English criminologist and public health and drug control expert

Cindy Fazey is a criminologist and former Chief of Demand Reduction for the United Nations Drug Control Programme. She has been Professor of International Drug Policy at the University of Liverpool since 1998. Fazey has spoken in the past of "the complete failure of national and international drugs policies." She has also noted that the organization of the international drug control apparatus makes it difficult to reform the system. On 24 February 2004, Fazey gave a speech at the Perspective on Cannabis conference at Liverpool titled Can you hear the grass growing? Cannabis and the repatriation of drug policy.

== UN Declaration on the Guiding Principles of Demand Reduction ==
Fazey drafted the UN Declaration on the Guiding Principles of Demand Reduction that was approved by a United Nations General Assembly Special Session in 1998. The Declaration was carefully worded to allow harm reduction measures, containing provisions such as "Demand reduction shall: (i) Aim at preventing the use of drugs and at reducing the adverse consequences of drug abuse" and "Demand reduction programmes should cover all areas of prevention from discouraging initial use to reducing the negative health and social consequences of drug abuse." According to Fazey, this could be interpreted to permit "exchange and distribution of needles and syringes, the prescription of heroin, injecting rooms and even on the spot testing of drugs like ecstasy."

Fazey is currently teaching the addictive behaviours course at the University of Liverpool.
