= United Nations Commission on Narcotic Drugs =

Central drug policy-making body of the UN System

Commission on Narcotic Drugs
- Abbreviation: CND
- Formation: 1946; 80 years ago
- Type: Intergovernmental organization, Regulatory body, Advisory board
- Legal status: Active
- Headquarters: Vienna International Center, Vienna, Austria
- Chairperson: Rotating every year
- Parent organization: UN ECOSOC
- Subsidiaries: FINGOV
- Website: CND at UNODC.org

The Commission on Narcotic Drugs (CND) is one of the functional commissions of the United Nations' Economic and Social Council (ECOSOC), and is the central drug policy-making body within the United Nations System. The CND also has important mandates under the three international drug control conventions, alongside the three other treaty-mandated bodies: United Nations Office on Drugs and Crime (on behalf of Secretary-General), World Health Organization, and International Narcotics Control Board.

== History ==
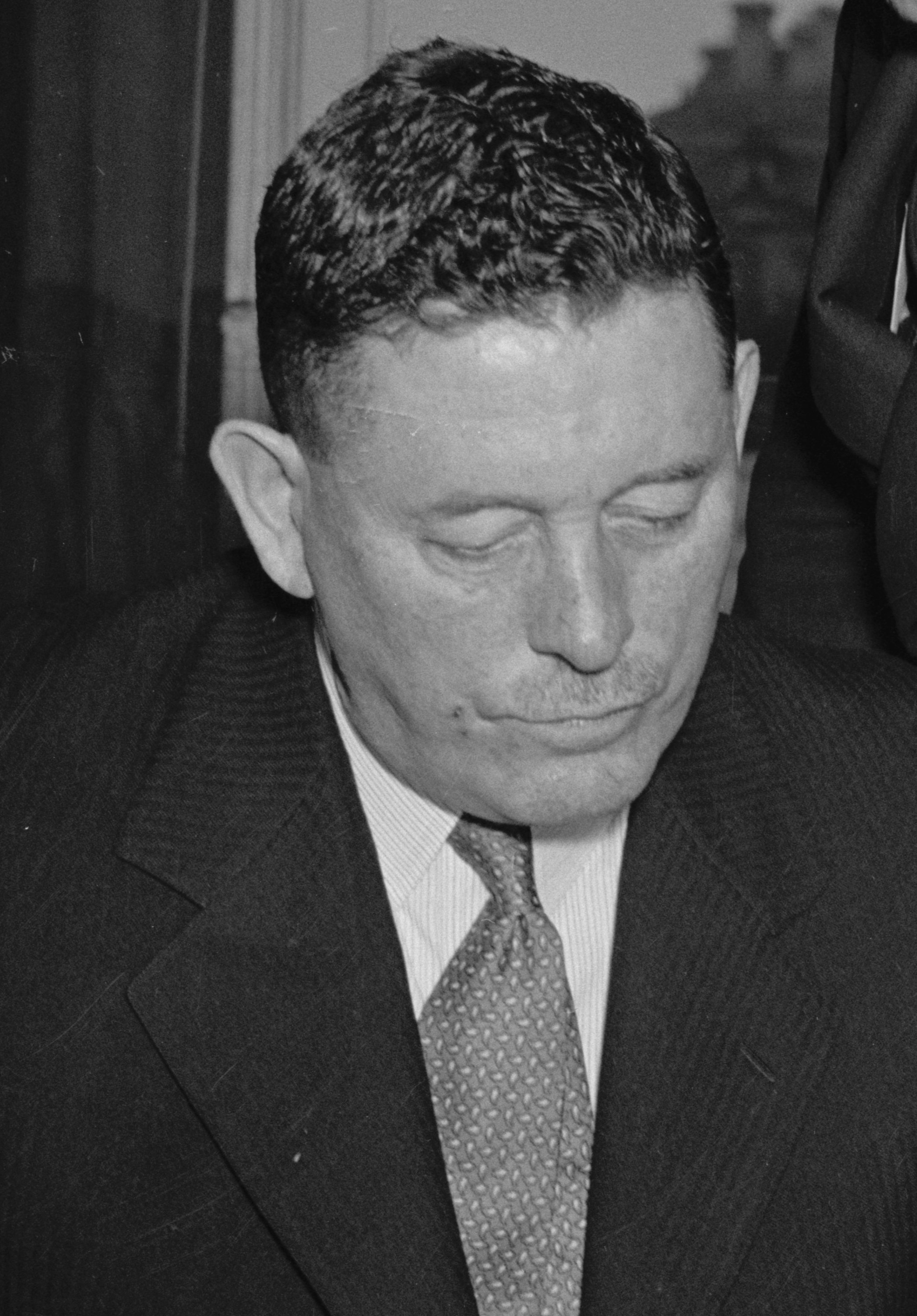
Charles Henry Ludovic Sharman (pictured 1938) was the CND's first chair

Under the League of Nations, the predecessor of the CND was the Advisory Committee on the Traffic in Opium and Other Dangerous Drugs, established by the first Assembly of the League of Nations on 15 December 1920, which met from 1921 to 1940.

After the World War II, the Commission on Narcotic Drugs was established as early as 1946, by ECOSOC resolution 9(I). Initially, the CND was composed of only 15 countries "Members of the United Nations, which are important producing or manufacturing countries or countries in which illicit traffic in narcotics constitutes a serious social problem."

The first members were Canada, Chinese Taipei, Egypt, France, India, Iran, Mexico, the Netherlands, Peru, Poland, Turkey, the UK, US, USSR, and Yugoslavia. The CND first met in December 1946 under the chairmanship of Canadian ambassador Charles Henry Ludovic Sharman. At its first meeting, the CND resolved to take over all powers and mandates related to drugs previously held by the League of Nations.

At first, CND's mandate was to assist ECOSOC in supervising the application of international conventions and agreements dealing with narcotic drugs. In December 1991, General Assembly resolution 46/104 assigned the CND the additional role of the governing body of the United Nations International Drug Control Programme, nowadays administered by the United Nations Office on Drugs and Crime.

== Work and mandate ==
The Commission on Narcotic Drugs has two distinct mandate areas:

1. Treaty-based and normative functions under the international drug control conventions,
2. Operational, policy-guidance functions as the governing body of the United Nations International Drug Control Programme, which is administered by the United Nations Office on Drugs and Crime.

=== Normative functions ===
The CND is the prime policymaking body in the field of international drug control policy.

The CND may make recommendation for the implementation of the Conventions, according to article 8 of the 1961 Convention and article 17 of the 1971 Convention.

==== Drug scheduling decisions ====
Under the international drug control conventions (namely: 1961 Single Convention on Narcotic Drugs, 1971 Convention on Psychotropic Substances, 1988 Convention against Illicit Traffic), the Commission on Narcotic Drugs is mandated to decide on the scope of control of substances:

- Narcotic drugs are placed under international control by including them in one of the four schedules of the 1961 Convention (simple majority vote), upon recommendation of the WHO;
- Psychotropic substances are placed under international control by including them in one of the four schedules of the 1971 Convention (2/3rd majority vote), upon recommendation of the WHO;
- Precursors are placed under international control by including them in one of the two tables of the 1988 Convention, upon recommendation of the INCB.

Each schedule and table entails a specific control regime. According to article 3 of the 1961 Convention, article 2 of the 1971 Convention and article 12 of the 1988 Convention, the CND decides on the addition of substances to the schedules/tables, as well as the transfer or deletion of substances. After the votes, States Parties can request a review of the scheduling decisions of the CND by the ECOSOC following article 3 (8) of the 1961 Convention, article 2 (8) of the 1971 Convention and article 12 (7) of the 1988 Convention.

Proposals to change the scope of control of substances can only be made by the World Health Organization (for the 1961 and 1971 Conventions) and the International Narcotics Control Board (for the 1988 Convention).

In 2020, the commission was brought to public attention when voting upon the removal of cannabis and cannabis resin from Schedule IV of the Single Convention on narcotic drugs, 1961.

=== Policy guidance ===
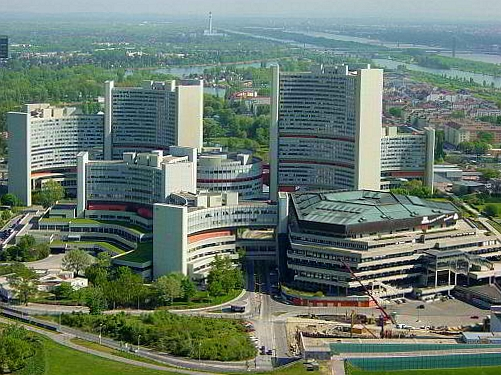
United Nations Office at Vienna where the Commission meets

The Commission on Narcotic Drugs provides policy guidance for the United Nations International Drug Control Programme, managed by the United Nations Office on Drugs and Crime (UNODC). It also prepares and monitors policy documents addressing the world drug problem. The main policy documents of the preceding decade are the 2009 Political Declaration and Plan of Action on International Cooperation towards an Integrated and Balanced Strategy to Counter the World Drug Problem, the Joint Ministerial Statement of the 2014 high-level review by the Commission on Narcotic Drugs of the implementation by Member States of the Political Declaration and Plan of Action and the outcome document of the thirtieth special session of the General Assembly, entitled "Our joint commitment to effectively addressing and countering the world drug problem". In March 2019, the CND adopted a Ministerial Declaration, in which it committed to accelerating the full implementation of these three policy documents and resolved to review the progress in implementing all international drug policy commitments in 2029, with a mid-term review in 2024.

The CND, performing its duties as a governing body, adopts during its regular sessions resolutions to provide policy guidance and monitors the activities of the UNODC. It further approves, based on a proposal of the executive director, the budget of the United Nations International Drug Control Programme, administered by the UNODC.

The CND, together with the Commission on Crime Prevention and Criminal Justice, is the governing body of the UNODC.

== Meetings ==
The CND meets usually twice annually:

- The main session is held during a week, usually in March.
- A short reconvened session, usually held in December, addresses administrative and budget matters. During December sessions, joint meetings are held with the CCPCJ to administer the UNODC.

== Membership and decision making ==
CND membership consists of 53 states, serving four-year terms, with the following distribution of seats among regions, following the United Nations Regional Groups:

- 11 for Africa;
- 11 for Asia-Pacific region;
- 10 for Latin America and the Caribbean (GRULAC);
- 6 for Eastern Europe;
- 14 for Western European and others (WEOG) states;
- 1 seat rotates between the Asia-Pacific and GRULAC every four years.

ECOSOC resolutions 845(XXXII) and 1147(XLI) provide that members are elected:

- From among the States Members of the United Nations and members of the specialized agencies and the Parties to the Single Convention on Narcotic Drugs, 1961;
- With due regard to the adequate representation of countries that are important producers of opium or coca leaves, of countries that are important in the field of the manufacture of narcotic drugs, and of countries in which drug addiction or the illicit traffic in narcotic drugs constitutes an important problem;
- Taking into account the principle of equitable geographical distribution.

Other countries not among the 53 CND Members are still allowed to attend CND meetings and negotiate decisions and resolutions: CND membership only allows to table new drafts, and vote on scheduling recommendations.

=== Decision-making procedure ===
The CND is an intergovernmental body made up of sovereign states rather than individuals. Decisions and resolutions are taken following the Rules of Procedure of the Functional Commissions of ECOSOC. Notwithstanding the rules of procedure, the Commission usually adopts decisions by consensus in the "Vienna spirit" that has been described by Yuri Fedotov (former UNODC Executive-Director) as: "the willingness and dedication of all concerned to pull together to find joint solutions, even on the most difficult topics". The "Vienna Consensus" has however been the focus of a number of criticisms in recent years.

Scheduling decisions under the international drug control conventions are governed by the rules of procedure contained in the 1961, 1971, and 1988 Conventions respectively, as they supersede following the lex specialis doctrine. Nonetheless, the CND sometimes disregards both ECOSOC rules of procedure and treaty-based requirements, as was the case during the considerations of WHO recommendations on cannabis and cannabis-related substances.

== Criticism ==
Being composed of government and ministerial representatives with permanent mission in Vienna, the Commission on Narcotic Drugs is regarded more of a political commission as opposed to a group of experts, which is why many discussions and negotiations are not based on in-depth knowledge on drug policy issues. In addition, decisions taken within the CND are primarily outcomes of time-consuming political negotiations which need to result in a consensus, allowing policy perspectives to be pushed aside by political interests of certain stakeholders.

Another aspect of criticism of the CND is related to the bureaucratic nature of the commission's working process. While the CND focuses on the issue of drugs (a multidisciplinary topic which also concerns human rights, health, development, or environmental issues) the CND rarely establishes coordination with other relevant UN agencies such as the Joint UN Programme on HIV/AIDS (UNAIDS), the Human Rights Council and High Commissioner for Human Rights (OHCHR), the World Health Organization, the United Nations Development Programme, UN Permanent Forum on Indigenous Issues, etc.

The CND is also criticized for leaving little room to the representation of civil society stakeholders, in particular NGOs, academics, and affected populations.

== See also ==
- ECOSOC
- The three other bodies mandated under the international drug control conventions:
  - Secretary-General (United Nations Office on Drugs and Crime)
  - World Health Organization
  - International Narcotics Control Board
- The three international drug control conventions:
  - Single Convention on Narcotic Drugs (1961)
  - Convention on Psychotropic Substances (1971)
  - United Nations Convention Against Illicit Traffic in Narcotic Drugs and Psychotropic Substances (1988)
- Drug
  - Prohibition of drugs
  - Drug policy
  - Drug liberalization
  - Cannabis treaty scheduling
  - Substance abuse prevention
  - Harm reduction
